= 1977–78 United States network television schedule =

The following is the 1977–78 network television schedule for the three major English language commercial broadcast networks in the United States. The schedule covers prime-time hours from September 1977 through August 1978. The schedule is followed by a list per network of returning series, new series, and series cancelled after the 1976–77 season. All times are Eastern and Pacific, with certain exceptions, such as Monday Night Football.

New fall series are highlighted in bold. Series ending their original runs are in italics.

Each of the 30 highest-rated shows is listed with its rank and rating as determined by Nielsen Media Research.

Yellow indicates the programs in the top 10 for the season.
Cyan indicates the programs in the top 20 for the season.
Magenta indicates the programs in the top 30 for the season.

PBS, the Public Broadcasting Service, was in operation, but the schedule was set by each local station. On ABC, debuting news brief, airs all seven nights at 9:58, pm.

== Sunday ==
Network		7:00 PM	7:30 PM	8:00 PM	8:30 PM	9:00 PM	9:30 PM	10:00 PM	10:30 PM
ABC	Fall	The Hardy Boys/Nancy Drew Mysteries		The Six Million Dollar Man		The ABC Sunday Night Movie (20/20.8) (Tied with The Waltons)			
ABC	Winter	The Hardy Boys/Nancy Drew Mysteries		**How the West Was Won** (11/22.5)		The ABC Sunday Night Movie (20/20.8) (Tied with The Waltons)			
CBS	Fall	60 Minutes (4/24.4) (Tied with Charlie's Angels and All in the Family)		Rhoda (25/20.1)	**On Our Own** (29/19.6)	All in the Family (4/24.4) (Tied with 60 Minutes and Charlie's Angels)	Alice (8/23.2) (Tied with M*A*S*H)	Kojak	
CBS	December	60 Minutes (4/24.4) (Tied with Charlie's Angels and All in the Family)		Rhoda (25/20.1)	**On Our Own** (29/19.6)	All in the Family (4/24.4) (Tied with 60 Minutes and Charlie's Angels)	Alice (8/23.2) (Tied with M*A*S*H)	The Carol Burnett Show	
CBS	Spring	60 Minutes (4/24.4) (Tied with Charlie's Angels and All in the Family)		Rhoda (25/20.1)	**On Our Own** (29/19.6)	All in the Family (4/24.4) (Tied with 60 Minutes and Charlie's Angels)	Alice (8/23.2) (Tied with M*A*S*H)	**Dallas**	
CBS	Summer	60 Minutes (4/24.4) (Tied with Charlie's Angels and All in the Family)		Rhoda (25/20.1)	**On Our Own** (29/19.6)	All in the Family (4/24.4) (Tied with 60 Minutes and Charlie's Angels)	Alice (8/23.2) (Tied with M*A*S*H)	Switch	
NBC	Fall	The Wonderful World of Disney				The Big Event (30/19.4)			
NBC	Winter	The Wonderful World of Disney		**Project U.F.O.** (19/21.2)		The Big Event (30/19.4)			

NOTE: On NBC, Off the Wall (a comedy about a co-ed college dorm) and C.P.O. Sharkey were originally scheduled to air from 8:00-9:00 p.m., but NBC canceled Off the Wall after a spring airing of its pilot finished last in that week's ratings.

== Monday ==
Network		8:00 PM	8:30 PM	9:00 PM	9:30 PM	10:00 PM	10:30 PM
ABC	Fall	**The San Pedro Beach Bums**		ABC NFL Monday Night Football (16/21.5)			
ABC	Winter	**Lucan**		The ABC Monday Night Movie (24/20.3)			
ABC	Follow-up	The Six Million Dollar Man		The ABC Monday Night Movie (24/20.3)			
ABC	Spring	Sugar Time!	Monday Night Baseball				
CBS	Fall	**Young Dan'l Boone**		**The Betty White Show**	Maude	**Rafferty**	
CBS	Follow-up	**Logan's Run**		M*A*S*H (8/23.2) (Tied with Alice)	One Day at a Time (10/23.0)	Switch	
CBS	Winter	**Logan's Run**		M*A*S*H (8/23.2) (Tied with Alice)	One Day at a Time (10/23.0)	**Lou Grant**	
CBS	Follow-up	Good Times	**Baby I'm Back**	M*A*S*H (8/23.2) (Tied with Alice)	One Day at a Time (10/23.0)	**Lou Grant**	
CBS	Summer	The Jeffersons	Good Times	M*A*S*H (8/23.2) (Tied with Alice)	One Day at a Time (10/23.0)	**Lou Grant**	
NBC		Little House on the Prairie (7/24.1)		NBC Monday Night at the Movies (15/21.7)			

== Tuesday ==
Network		8:00 PM	8:30 PM	9:00 PM	9:30 PM	10:00 PM	10:30 PM
ABC	Fall	Happy Days (2/31.4)	Laverne & Shirley (1/31.6)	Three's Company (3/28.3)	**Soap** (13/22.0)	Family (26/19.9) (Tied with The Incredible Hulk and Welcome Back, Kotter)	
ABC	Spring	Happy Days (2/31.4)	Laverne & Shirley (1/31.6)	Three's Company (3/28.3)	**Soap** (13/22.0)	**Having Babies**	
ABC	Follow-up	Happy Days (2/31.4)	Laverne & Shirley (1/31.6)	Three's Company (3/28.3)	**The Harvey Korman Show**	**Having Babies**	
ABC	Summer	Happy Days (2/31.4)	Laverne & Shirley (1/31.6)	Three's Company (3/28.3)	**Carter Country**	**20/20**	
CBS	Fall	**The Fitzpatricks**		M*A*S*H (8/23.2) (Tied with Alice)	One Day at a Time (10/23.0)	**Lou Grant**	
CBS	Winter	**Celebrity Challenge of the Sexes**	The Shields and Yarnell Show	CBS Tuesday Night Movie			
CBS	Spring	**Sam**	The Shields and Yarnell Show	CBS Tuesday Night Movie			
NBC	Fall	**The Richard Pryor Show**		Event and miniseries programming			
NBC	Follow-up	**Man from Atlantis**		**Mulligan's Stew**		Police Woman	
NBC	Winter	**Chuck Barris Rah Rah Show**		Event and miniseries programming			
NBC	Spring	**Rollergirls**	**Joe & Valerie**	Event and miniseries programming			

== Wednesday ==
Network		8:00 PM	8:30 PM	9:00 PM	9:30 PM	10:00 PM	10:30 PM
ABC	Fall	Eight Is Enough (12/22.2)		Charlie's Angels (4/24.4) (Tied with 60 Minutes and All in the Family)		Baretta	
ABC	Winter	Eight Is Enough (12/22.2)		Charlie's Angels (4/24.4) (Tied with 60 Minutes and All in the Family)		Starsky & Hutch	
ABC	Spring	Eight Is Enough (12/22.2)		Charlie's Angels (4/24.4) (Tied with 60 Minutes and All in the Family)		Starsky & Hutch	
ABC	Summer	Eight Is Enough (12/22.2)		Charlie's Angels (4/24.4) (Tied with 60 Minutes and All in the Family)		Starsky & Hutch	
CBS	Fall	Good Times	Busting Loose	The CBS Wednesday Night Movies			
CBS	Follow-up	Good Times	Szysznyk	The CBS Wednesday Night Movies			
CBS	Spring	**The Amazing Spider-Man**		The CBS Wednesday Night Movies			
NBC	Fall	The Life and Times of Grizzly Adams		**The Oregon Trail**		**Big Hawaii**	
NBC	Follow-up	The Life and Times of Grizzly Adams		The Black Sheep Squadron		Police Woman	
NBC	Summer	The Life and Times of Grizzly Adams		Headliners With David Frost		Police Woman	

== Thursday ==
Network		8:00 PM	8:30 PM	9:00 PM	9:30 PM	10:00 PM	10:30 PM
ABC	Fall	Welcome Back, Kotter (26/19.9) (Tied with The Incredible Hulk and Family)	What's Happening!!	Barney Miller (17/21.4) (Tied with Fantasy Island)	**Carter Country**	**The Redd Foxx Comedy Hour**	
ABC	Winter	Welcome Back, Kotter (26/19.9) (Tied with The Incredible Hulk and Family)	Fish	Barney Miller (17/21.4) (Tied with Fantasy Island)	**Carter Country**	Baretta	
ABC	Spring	Welcome Back, Kotter (26/19.9) (Tied with The Incredible Hulk and Family)	Fish	Barney Miller (17/21.4) (Tied with Fantasy Island)	**A.E.S. Hudson Street**	Baretta	
CBS		The Waltons (20/20.8) (Tied with The ABC Sunday Night Movie)		Hawaii Five-O (23/20.4)		Barnaby Jones (22/20.6)	
NBC	Fall	**CHiPs**		**Man from Atlantis**		**Rosetti and Ryan**	
NBC	November	**CHiPs**		**James at 15**		**What Really Happened to the Class of '65?**	
NBC	February	**CHiPs**		**James at 16**		**What Really Happened to the Class of '65?**	
NBC	March	**CHiPs**		The Black Sheep Squadron		**What Really Happened to the Class of '65?**	
NBC	Spring	**The Hanna-Barbera Happy Hour**		**The Runaways**		Police Woman	
NBC	May	**CHiPs**		**James at 16**		Police Woman	

== Friday ==
Network		8:00 PM	8:30 PM	9:00 PM	9:30 PM	10:00 PM	10:30 PM
ABC		Donny & Marie		The ABC Friday Night Movie			
CBS	Fall	The New Adventures of Wonder Woman		**Logan's Run**		Switch!	
CBS	Follow-up	The New Adventures of Wonder Woman		The CBS Friday Night Movie			
CBS	Winter	The New Adventures of Wonder Woman		**The Incredible Hulk** (26/19.9) (Tied with Family and Welcome Back, Kotter)		**Husbands, Wives & Lovers**	
NBC	Fall	**Sanford Arms**	Chico and the Man	The Rockford Files		Quincy, M.E.	
NBC	October	C.P.O. Sharkey	Chico and the Man	The Rockford Files		Quincy, M.E.	
NBC	Winter	**Quark**	C.P.O. Sharkey	The Rockford Files		Quincy, M.E.	
NBC	Spring	**Quark**	C.P.O. Sharkey	**Richie Brockelman, Private Eye**		Quincy, M.E.	
NBC	April	**Quark**	C.P.O. Sharkey	The Rockford Files		Quincy, M.E.	
NBC	Summer	C.P.O. Sharkey	Chico and the Man	The Rockford Files		Quincy, M.E.	

== Saturday ==
Network		8:00 PM	8:30 PM	9:00 PM	9:30 PM	10:00 PM	10:30 PM
ABC	Fall	Fish	**Operation Petticoat**	Starsky & Hutch		**The Love Boat** (14/21.9)	
ABC	November	**Tabitha**	**Operation Petticoat**	Starsky & Hutch		**The Love Boat** (14/21.9)	
ABC	Winter	What's Happening!!	**Operation Petticoat**	**The Love Boat** (14/21.9)		**Fantasy Island** (17/21.4) (Tied with Barney Miller)	
ABC	Spring	**Mel & Susan Together**	**Operation Petticoat**	**The Love Boat** (14/21.9)		**Fantasy Island** (17/21.4) (Tied with Barney Miller)	
ABC	June	**Free Country**	ABC Comedy Special	**The Love Boat** (14/21.9)		**Fantasy Island** (17/21.4) (Tied with Barney Miller)	
ABC	Summer	Family		**The Love Boat** (14/21.9)		**Fantasy Island** (17/21.4) (Tied with Barney Miller)	
CBS	Fall	The Bob Newhart Show	**We've Got Each Other**	The Jeffersons	The Tony Randall Show	The Carol Burnett Show	
CBS	Winter	The Bob Newhart Show	The Tony Randall Show	The Jeffersons	Maude	Kojak	
CBS	Spring	The Jeffersons	**The Ted Knight Show**	**Another Day**	Maude	Kojak	
NBC		The Bionic Woman		NBC Saturday Night at the Movies			

== By network ==
=== ABC ===
**Returning Series**

- The ABC Friday Night Movie
- The ABC Monday Night Movie
- ABC NFL Monday Night Football
- The ABC Sunday Night Movie
- Baretta
- Barney Miller
- Charlie's Angels
- Donny & Marie
- Eight Is Enough
- Family
- Fish
- Happy Days
- The Hardy Boys/Nancy Drew Mysteries
- How the West Was Won
- Laverne & Shirley
- Monday Night Baseball
- The Six Million Dollar Man
- Starsky & Hutch
- Sugar Time!
- Three's Company
- Welcome Back, Kotter
- What's Happening!!

**New Series**

- **20/20**
- **A.E.S. Hudson Street** *
- **Carter Country**
- **Fantasy Island** *
- **Free Country** *
- **The Harvey Korman Show** *
- **Having Babies** *
- **The Love Boat**
- **Lucan**
- **Mel & Susan Together** *
- **Operation Petticoat**
- **The Redd Foxx Comedy Hour** *
- **The San Pedro Beach Bums**
- **Soap**
- **Tabitha**

Not returning from 1976–77:

- The ABC Tuesday Night Movie
- The Bionic Woman (moved to NBC)
- Blansky's Beauties
- The Brady Bunch Variety Hour
- The Captain and Tennille
- Cos
- Dog and Cat
- The Feather and Father Gang
- Holmes & Yoyo
- Mr. T and Tina
- Most Wanted
- The Nancy Walker Show
- Rich Man, Poor Man Book II
- The Streets of San Francisco
- The Tony Randall Show (moved to CBS)
- Westside Medical
- Wonder Woman (moved to CBS)

=== CBS ===
**Returning Series**

- 60 Minutes
- Alice
- All in the Family
- Barnaby Jones
- The Bob Newhart Show
- Busting Loose
- The Carol Burnett Show
- Good Times
- Hawaii Five-O
- The Jeffersons
- Kojak
- M*A*S*H
- Maude
- The New Adventures of Wonder Woman (moved from ABC)
- One Day at a Time
- Rhoda
- The Shields and Yarnell Show
- Switch
- Szysznyk
- The Tony Randall Show (moved from ABC)
- The Waltons

**New Series**

- **The Amazing Spider-Man**
- **Another Day** *
- **Baby, I'm Back** *
- **The Betty White Show**
- **Celebrity Challenge of the Sexes** *
- **Dallas** *
- **The Fitzpatricks**
- **Husbands, Wives & Lovers** *
- **The Incredible Hulk** *
- **Logan's Run**
- **Lou Grant**
- **On Our Own**
- **Rafferty**
- **Sam** *
- **The Ted Knight Show** *
- **We've Got Each Other**
- **Young Dan'l Boone**

Not returning from 1976–77:

- All's Fair
- The Andros Targets
- Ball Four
- The Blue Knight
- Code R
- Delvecchio
- The Diahann Carroll Show
- Doc
- Executive Suite
- Hunter
- The Jacksons
- The Keane Brothers Show
- Loves Me, Loves Me Not
- The Marilyn McCoo and Billy Davis, Jr. Show
- The Mary Tyler Moore Show
- Nashville 99
- Phyllis
- Spencer's Pilots
- The Sonny and Cher Show
- Starland Vocal Band Show
- The Tony Orlando and Dawn Rainbow Hour
- Who's Who
- A Year at the Top

=== NBC ===
**Returning Series**

- The Black Sheep Squadron
- The Big Event
- The Bionic Woman (moved from ABC)
- C.P.O. Sharkey
- Chico and the Man
- Columbo
- Headliners With David Frost
- The Life and Times of Grizzly Adams
- Little House on the Prairie
- NBC Monday Night at the Movies
- NBC Saturday Night at the Movies
- Police Woman
- Quincy, M.E.
- The Rockford Files
- The Wonderful World of Disney

**New Series**

- **Big Hawaii**
- **CHiPs**
- **Chuck Barris Rah Rah Show** *
- **The Hanna-Barbera Happy Hour** *
- **James at 15**
- **Joe & Valerie** *
- **Man from Atlantis**
- **Mulligan's Stew** *
- **The Oregon Trail**
- **Project U.F.O.** *
- **Quark**
- **The Richard Pryor Show**
- **Richie Brockelman, Private Eye** *
- **Rollergirls** *
- **Rosetti and Ryan**
- **The Runaways** *
- **Sanford Arms**
- **What Really Happened to the Class of '65?** *

Not returning from 1976–77:

- 3 Girls 3
- Comedy Time
- Emergency!
- The Fantastic Journey
- Gemini Man
- Gibbsville
- The Kallikaks
- Kingston: Confidential
- Lanigan's Rabbi
- McCloud
- The McLean Stevenson Show
- McMillan & Wife
- NBC's Best Sellers
- The NBC Sunday Mystery Movie
- Police Story
- The Practice
- The Quest
- Quinn Martin's Tales of the Unexpected
- Sanford and Son
- Serpico
- Sirota's Court
- Van Dyke and Company

Note: The * indicates that the program was introduced in midseason.

== Additional sources ==
- Castleman, H. & Podrazik, W. (1982). Watching TV: Four Decades of American Television. New York: McGraw-Hill. 314 pp.
- McNeil, Alex. Total Television. Fourth edition. New York: Penguin Books. ISBN 0-14-024916-8.
- Brooks, Tim & Marsh, Earle (1985). The Complete Directory to Prime Time Network TV Shows (3rd ed.). New York: Ballantine. ISBN 0-345-31864-1.
