= 1976–77 United States network television schedule =

The following is the 1976–77 network television schedule for the three major English language commercial broadcast networks in the United States. The schedule covers primetime hours from September 1976 through August 1977. The schedule is followed by a list per network of returning series, new series, and series cancelled after the 1975–76 season. All times are Eastern and Pacific, with certain exceptions, such as Monday Night Football.

New fall series are highlighted in bold.

Each of the 30 highest-rated shows is listed with its rank and rating as determined by Nielsen Media Research.

Yellow indicates the programs in the top 10 for the season.
Cyan indicates the programs in the top 20 for the season.
Magenta indicates the programs in the top 30 for the season.

PBS, the Public Broadcasting Service, was in operation, but the schedule was set by each local station.

The Muppet Show (syndicated in the U.S.) premiered this season.

== Sunday ==
Network		7:00 PM	7:30 PM	8:00 PM	8:30 PM	9:00 PM	9:30 PM	10:00 PM	10:30 PM
ABC	Fall	**Cos**		The Six Million Dollar Man (7/24.2)		The ABC Sunday Night Movie (8/23.4) (Tied with Baretta and One Day at a Time)			
ABC	Winter	**Hardy Boys/Nancy Drew Mysteries**		The Six Million Dollar Man (7/24.2)		The ABC Sunday Night Movie (8/23.4) (Tied with Baretta and One Day at a Time)			
CBS	Fall	60 Minutes (18/21.9) (Tied with Hawaii Five-O)		The Sonny and Cher Show		Kojak		**Delvecchio**	
CBS	Winter	60 Minutes (18/21.9) (Tied with Hawaii Five-O)		Rhoda	Phyllis	Switch		**Delvecchio**	
CBS	Summer	60 Minutes (18/21.9) (Tied with Hawaii Five-O)		Rhoda	**Starland Vocal Band Show**	Switch		**Delvecchio**	
NBC		The Wonderful World of Disney		NBC Sunday Mystery Movie: Columbo / McCloud / McMillan / **Quincy, M.E.** / **Lanigan's Rabbi** (beginning winter)			**The Big Event** (6/24.4)		

== Monday ==
Network		8:00 PM	8:30 PM	9:00 PM	9:30 PM	10:00 PM	10:30 PM
ABC	Fall	**The Captain and Tennille**		ABC NFL Monday Night Football (22/21.2)			
ABC	Winter	**The Captain and Tennille**		The ABC Monday Night Movie (3/26.0)			
ABC	Spring	**The Brady Bunch Hour**		**Most Wanted**		**The Feather and Father Gang**	
ABC	Summer	**The ABC Monday Night Comedy Special**	Monday Night Baseball				
ABC	August	**Holmes & Yoyo**	Monday Night Baseball				
ABC	Follow-up	**The ABC Monday Night Comedy Special**	Monday Night Baseball				
CBS	Fall	Rhoda	Phyllis	Maude	**All's Fair**	**Executive Suite**	
CBS	Winter	The Jeffersons (24/21.0)	**Busting Loose**	Maude	**All's Fair**	**The Andros Targets**	
CBS	Summer	The Jeffersons (24/21.0)	**The Shields and Yarnell Show**	Maude	**All's Fair**	The Sonny and Cher Show	
CBS	August	The Jeffersons (24/21.0)	**Szysznyk**	Maude	**All's Fair**	The Sonny and Cher Show	
NBC		Little House on the Prairie (15/22.3) (Tied with The Waltons)		NBC Monday Night at the Movies (20/21.8)			

Note: The Brady Bunch Hour previously aired on a sporadic basis starting in November 1976, before becoming a weekly series in February 1977.

== Tuesday ==
Network		8:00 PM	8:30 PM	9:00 PM	9:30 PM	10:00 PM	10:30 PM
ABC	Fall	Happy Days (1/31.5)	Laverne & Shirley (2/30.9)	**Rich Man, Poor Man Book II** (21/21.6)		Family	
ABC	Winter	Happy Days (1/31.5)	Laverne & Shirley (2/30.9)	**Eight Is Enough** (23/21.1)		Family	
ABC	Summer	Happy Days (1/31.5)	Laverne & Shirley (2/30.9)	Rich Man, Poor Man			
ABC	Follow-up	Happy Days (1/31.5)	Laverne & Shirley (2/30.9)	The ABC Tuesday Night Movie			
CBS	Fall	The Tony Orlando and Dawn Rainbow Hour		M*A*S*H (4/25.9)	One Day at a Time (8/23.4) (Tied with The ABC Sunday Night Movie and Baretta)	Switch!	
CBS	Winter	**Who's Who**		M*A*S*H (4/25.9)	One Day at a Time (8/23.4) (Tied with The ABC Sunday Night Movie and Baretta)	Kojak	
CBS	Summer	The Family Holvak		M*A*S*H (4/25.9)	One Day at a Time (8/23.4) (Tied with The ABC Sunday Night Movie and Baretta)	Kojak	
CBS	Mid-Summer	The Jack Benny Show	Phyllis	M*A*S*H (4/25.9)	One Day at a Time (8/23.4) (Tied with The ABC Sunday Night Movie and Baretta)	Kojak	
NBC		**Baa Baa Black Sheep**		Police Woman		Police Story	

Note: On ABC, the 1977 summer miniseries Rich Man, Poor Man consisted of reruns of the 1976 miniseries. On CBS, The Family Holvak consisted of reruns of the 1975 NBC series before being replaced by a four-week run of The Jack Benny Show (with Phyllis in the 8:30 slot), featuring episodes from its 1963-64 season.

== Wednesday ==
Network		8:00 PM	8:30 PM	9:00 PM	9:30 PM	10:00 PM	10:30 PM
ABC	Fall	The Bionic Woman (14/22.4)		Baretta (8/23.4) (Tied with The ABC Sunday Night Movie and One Day at a Time)		**Charlie's Angels** (5/25.8)	
ABC	Summer	Donny & Marie		Baretta (8/23.4) (Tied with The ABC Sunday Night Movie and One Day at a Time)		**Charlie's Angels** (5/25.8)	
ABC	Follow-up	**Eight Is Enough**		**Charlie's Angels**		Baretta	
CBS	Fall	Good Times (26/20.5)	**Ball Four**	All in the Family (12/22.9)	**Alice** (30/20.0)	The Blue Knight	
CBS	October	Good Times (26/20.5)	The Jeffersons (24/21.0)	The CBS Wednesday Night Movie			
CBS	Winter	Good Times (26/20.5)	The Jacksons	The CBS Wednesday Night Movie			
CBS	Spring	Good Times (26/20.5)	**Loves Me, Loves Me Not**	The CBS Wednesday Night Movie			
CBS	Summer	Good Times (26/20.5)	**Alice**	The CBS Wednesday Night Movie			
CBS	Follow-up	Good Times (26/20.5)	**Busting Loose**	The CBS Wednesday Night Movie			
NBC	Fall	The Practice	**NBC Movie of the Week**			**The Quest**	
NBC	December	**C.P.O. Sharkey**	**The McLean Stevenson Show**	**Sirota's Court**	The Practice	**The Quest**	
NBC	Winter	**The Life and Times of Grizzly Adams**		**C.P.O. Sharkey**	**The McLean Stevenson Show**	**Quinn Martin's Tales of the Unexpected**	
NBC	Spring	**The Life and Times of Grizzly Adams**		**C.P.O. Sharkey**	**Sirota's Court**	**Kingston: Confidential**	
NBC	Summer	**The Life and Times of Grizzly Adams**		**3 Girls 3**		**Kingston: Confidential**	
NBC	July	**The Life and Times of Grizzly Adams**		**C.P.O. Sharkey**	**Comedy Time**	**Kingston: Confidential**	
NBC	August	**The Life and Times of Grizzly Adams**		**C.P.O. Sharkey**	**The Kallikaks**	**Quinn Martin's Tales of the Unexpected**	

NOTE: On NBC, Comedy Time was a summer anthology series composed of unsold television pilots that aired on Wednesdays in July and on Thursdays on July 21 and 28, August 25, and September 1.

== Thursday ==
Network		8:00 PM	8:30 PM	9:00 PM	9:30 PM	10:00 PM	10:30 PM
ABC	Fall	Welcome Back, Kotter (13/22.7)	Barney Miller (17/22.2)	**The Tony Randall Show** (29/20.1)	**The Nancy Walker Show**	The Streets of San Francisco	
ABC	Winter	Welcome Back, Kotter (13/22.7)	What's Happening!! (25/20.9)	Barney Miller (17/22.2)	**The Tony Randall Show** (29/20.1)	**Westside Medical**	
ABC	Spring	Welcome Back, Kotter (13/22.7)	What's Happening!! (25/20.9)	Barney Miller (17/22.2)	**Three's Company** (11/23.1)	**Westside Medical**	
CBS		The Waltons (15/22.3) (Tied with Little House on the Prairie)		Hawaii Five-O (18/21.9) (Tied with 60 Minutes)		Barnaby Jones	
NBC	Fall	**Gemini Man**		**NBC's Best Sellers**		**Van Dyke and Company**	
NBC	November	**Van Dyke and Company**		**NBC's Best Sellers**		**Gibbsville**	
NBC	Winter	**The Fantastic Journey**		**NBC's Best Sellers**			
NBC	Summer	**Comedy Time** / Specials		NBC Thursday Night at the Movies			

Notes: NBC originally planned to air Snip (a sitcom starring David Brenner) on Thursdays at 9:30 with The Practice preceding it at 9:00. On August 28, NBC announced a "massive reshuffling" of its schedule and pulled Snip, which never aired.

Comedy Time was a summer anthology series composed of unsold television pilots that aired on NBC on Wednesdays in July and on Thursdays on July 21 and 28, August 25, and September 1.

== Friday ==
Network		8:00 PM	8:30 PM	9:00 PM	9:30 PM	10:00 PM	10:30 PM
ABC		Donny & Marie		The ABC Friday Night Movie (28/20.2)			
CBS	Fall	**Spencer's Pilots**		The CBS Friday Night Movie			
CBS	Winter	**Code R**		The Sonny & Cher Show		**Executive Suite**	
CBS	Follow-up	**Code R**		The Sonny & Cher Show		**Hunter**	
CBS	April	**Code R**		**Nashville 99**		**Hunter**	
CBS	Follow-up	**Code R**		The CBS Friday Night Movie			
CBS	Summer	**A Year at the Top**	**The Keane Brothers Show**	The CBS Friday Night Movie			
NBC	Fall	Sanford and Son (27/20.3)	Chico and the Man	The Rockford Files		**Serpico**	
NBC	Winter	Sanford and Son (27/20.3)	Chico and the Man	The Rockford Files		**Quincy, M.E.**	

Note: A special program, Campaign '76, aired on CBS from 7:30 to 8:00 p.m. from September to early November in preparation for the 1976 presidential election.

== Saturday ==
Network		8:00 PM	8:30 PM	9:00 PM	9:30 PM	10:00 PM	10:30 PM
ABC	Fall	**Holmes & Yoyo**	**Mr. T and Tina**	Starsky & Hutch		**Most Wanted**	
ABC	Winter	**Blansky's Beauties**	**Fish**	Starsky & Hutch		**Dog and Cat**	
ABC	Summer	Wonder Woman		Starsky & Hutch		**The Feather and Father Gang**	
ABC	Follow-up	**Mr. T and Tina**	**Sugar Time!**	Starsky & Hutch		**Most Wanted**	
CBS	Fall	The Jeffersons (24/21.0)	Doc	The Mary Tyler Moore Show	The Bob Newhart Show	The Carol Burnett Show	
CBS	October	The Mary Tyler Moore Show	The Bob Newhart Show	All in the Family (12/22.9)	**Alice** (30/20.0)	The Carol Burnett Show	
CBS	Spring	The Mary Tyler Moore Show	The Bob Newhart Show	All in the Family (12/22.9)	**Alice** (30/20.0)	**The Andros Targets**	
CBS	Summer	The Mary Tyler Moore Show	The Bob Newhart Show	All in the Family (12/22.9)	**Alice** (30/20.0)	Switch	
CBS	Follow-up	The Mary Tyler Moore Show	The Bob Newhart Show	All in the Family (12/22.9)	**Alice** (30/20.0)	**The Diahann Carroll Show**	
NBC		Emergency!		NBC Saturday Night at the Movies			

== By network ==
=== ABC ===
**Returning Series**

- The ABC Friday Night Movie
- The ABC Monday Night Movie
- ABC NFL Monday Night Football
- The ABC Sunday Night Movie
- Baretta
- Barney Miller
- The Bionic Woman
- Donny & Marie
- Family
- Happy Days
- Laverne & Shirley
- Monday Night Baseball
- Starsky & Hutch
- The Six Million Dollar Man
- The Streets of San Francisco
- Welcome Back, Kotter

**New Series**

- **The ABC Tuesday Night Movie**
- **Blansky's Beauties** *
- **The Brady Bunch Hour** *
- **The Captain and Tennille**
- **Charlie's Angels**
- **Cos**
- **Dog and Cat** *
- **Eight Is Enough** *
- **The Feather and Father Gang** *
- **Fish** *
- **Future Cop** *
- **The Hardy Boys/Nancy Drew Mysteries** *
- **Holmes & Yoyo**
- **How the West Was Won** *
- **Mr. T and Tina**
- **Most Wanted**
- **The Nancy Walker Show**
- **Rich Man, Poor Man Book II**
- **Sugar Time!**
- **Three's Company** *
- **The Tony Randall Show**
- **Westside Medical** *
- **What's Happening!!**
- **Wonder Woman** *

Not returning from 1975–76:

- Almost Anything Goes
- Barbary Coast
- Bert D'Angelo/Superstar
- Good Heavens
- Harry O
- Marcus Welby, M.D.
- Matt Helm
- Mobile One
- On the Rocks
- Rich Man, Poor Man
- The Rookies
- Saturday Night Live with Howard Cosell
- S.W.A.T.
- The Swiss Family Robinson
- That's My Mama
- When Things Were Rotten
- Viva Valdez

=== CBS ===
**Returning Series**

- 60 Minutes
- All in the Family
- Barnaby Jones
- The Blue Knight
- The Bob Newhart Show
- The Carol Burnett Show
- Doc
- Good Times
- Hawaii Five-O
- The Jacksons
- The Jeffersons
- Kojak
- M*A*S*H
- The Mary Tyler Moore Show
- Maude
- One Day at a Time
- Phyllis
- Rhoda
- The Sonny and Cher Show
- Switch
- The Tony Orlando and Dawn Rainbow Hour
- The Waltons

**New Series**

- **Alice**
- **All's Fair**
- **The Andros Targets** *
- **Ball Four**
- **Busting Loose** *
- **Code R** *
- **Delvecchio**
- **The Diahann Carroll Show** *
- **Executive Suite**
- **Hunter** *
- **The Keane Brothers Show** *
- **Loves Me, Loves Me Not** *
- **The Marilyn McCoo and Billy Davis, Jr. Show**
- **Nashville 99** *
- **The Shields and Yarnell Show** *
- **Spencer's Pilots**
- **Starland Vocal Band Show** *
- **Szysznyk** *
- **Who's Who** *
- **A Year at the Top** *

Not returning from 1975–76:

- Beacon Hill
- Big Eddie
- Bronk
- The Bugs Bunny/Road Runner Show
- Cannon
- CBS Thursday Night Movie
- Cher
- Ivan the Terrible
- I've Got a Secret
- Joe and Sons
- Johnny Cash and Friends
- Kate McShane
- The Kelly Monteith Show
- Medical Center
- Popi
- Sara
- Three for the Road

=== NBC ===
**Returning Series**

- Chico and the Man
- Columbo
- Emergency!
- Little House on the Prairie
- McCloud
- McMillan & Wife
- The NBC Sunday Mystery Movie
- NBC Monday Night at the Movies
- NBC Saturday Night at the Movies
- Police Story
- Police Woman
- The Practice
- The Rockford Files
- Sanford and Son
- The Wonderful World of Disney

**New Series**

- **3 Girls 3** *
- **Baa Baa Black Sheep**
- **The Big Event**
- **Comedy Time** *
- **C.P.O. Sharkey** *
- **The Fantastic Journey** *
- **Gemini Man**
- **Gibbsville** *
- **The Kallikaks** *
- **Kingston: Confidential** *
- **Lanigan's Rabbi** *
- **The Life and Times of Grizzly Adams** *
- **The McLean Stevenson Show** *
- **NBC's Best Sellers** *
- **The Quest**
- **Quincy, M.E.** *
- **Quinn Martin's Tales of the Unexpected** *
- **Serpico**
- **Sirota's Court** *
- **Van Dyke and Company**

Not returning from 1975–76:

- City of Angels
- Comedy Theatre (returned in 1979)
- The Cop and the Kid
- Doctors' Hospital
- The Dumplings
- Ellery Queen
- The Family Holvak
- Fay
- Grady
- The Invisible Man
- Jigsaw John
- Joe Forrester
- The John Davidson Show
- The Mac Davis Show
- McCoy
- Medical Story
- The Montefuscos
- Movin' On
- Petrocelli
- The Rich Little Show

Note: The * indicates that the program was introduced in midseason.

== Additional sources ==
- Castleman, H. & Podrazik, W. (1982). Watching TV: Four Decades of American Television. New York: McGraw-Hill. 314 pp.
- McNeil, Alex. Total Television. Fourth edition. New York: Penguin Books. ISBN 0-14-024916-8.
- Brooks, Tim & Marsh, Earle (1985). The Complete Directory to Prime Time Network TV Shows (3rd ed.). New York: Ballantine. ISBN 0-345-31864-1.
