= 1977 in American television =

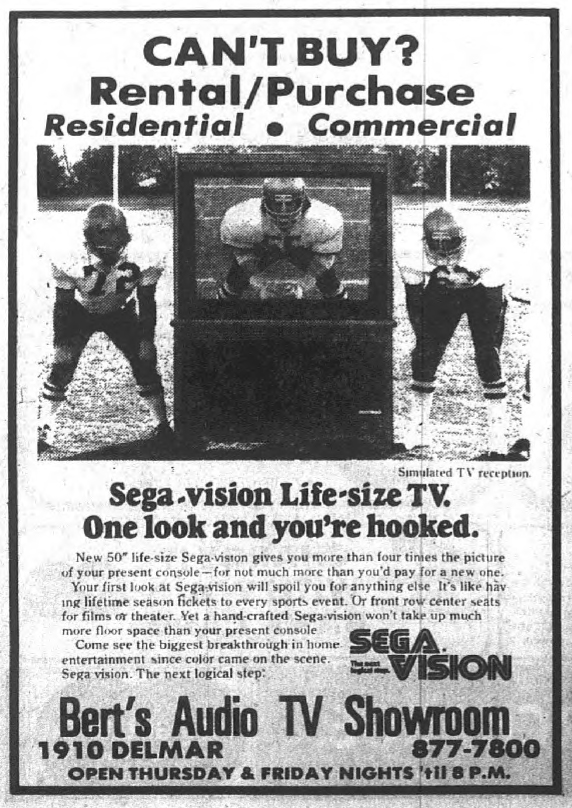
1977 advertisement for a 50-inch (130 cm) Sega-Vision television.

This is a list of American television-related events in 1977.

== Events ==
Date	Event
January 3	Holly Hallstrom becomes the third model on the CBS game show The Price Is Right along with Janice Pennington and Dian Parkinson. This lineup would remain unchanged for the next thirteen years until Kathleen Bradley joined in 1990.
January 15	Bill Murray joins the cast of NBC's Saturday Night Live, replacing Chevy Chase who left the previous year.
January 30	The Hardy Boys/Nancy Drew Mysteries, based on The Hardy Boys and Nancy Drew book series, premieres on ABC; Parker Stevenson and Shaun Cassidy star as Frank and Joe Hardy, and Pamela Sue Martin stars as Nancy Drew. The series at first alternated between the two characters, with The Brady Bunch Hour airing sporadically.
February 4	American Bandstand celebrates its 25th anniversary on television with a special hosted by Dick Clark and telecast by ABC. An "all-star band" made up of Chuck Berry, Seals & Crofts, Gregg Allman, Junior Walker, Johnny Rivers, the Pointer Sisters, Charlie Daniels, Doc Severinsen, Les McCann, Donald Byrd, Chuck Mangione and three members of Booker T and the MGs perform "Roll Over Beethoven."
February 27	Fed up with excessive violence and distorted images of sex on TV, the Reverend Donald Wildmon declares "Turn the Television Off Week." He is largely ignored.
March 1	The CBS game show Match Game is named the #1 rated game show on television for the fifth year in a row.
March 4	Freddie Prinze makes his final appearance on the NBC sitcom Chico and the Man. Prinze had actually taped the episode in question a mere hours before he fatally shot himself on January 28, 1977.
March 7	Second Chance, the forerunner to Press Your Luck, premieres on ABC.
March 11	Sesame Street broadcasts its 1,000th episode on PBS.
March 15	Renata Scotto and Luciano Pavarotti are seen in "La bohème" on PBS and heard in stereo on local (mostly NPR) stations in the first live "simulcast" from the Met.
March 19	The series finale of The Mary Tyler Moore Show is broadcast on CBS.
March 27	In Milwaukee, Wisconsin, ABC affiliate WITI and CBS affiliate WISN-TV swap affiliations, reversing a swap that took place in 1961.
March 30	Esther Rolle departs the CBS sitcom Good Times shortly after the conclusion of the two-part fourth-season finale, "Love Has a Spot On Its Lung." due to the dismissal of John Amos (who portrayed her on-screen husband James Evans) and the stereotypical behavior of its de facto star Jimmie Walker (who portrayed her son J.J. Evans). Rolle does not return until the sixth and final season in September 1978.
April 22	Cleveland's CBS station WJW-TV changes its name to WJKW-TV.
June 6	Lisa Peluso makes her first appearance on the CBS soap opera Search for Tomorrow as Wendy Wilkins, a role she would play until December 1985.
June 27	In San Diego, California, ABC, angered over the forced loss of their affiliation from XETV in nearby Tijuana, Mexico in 1973, moves from the station which forced the change, KCST-TV, to NBC affiliate KGTV. KCST-TV assumes KGTV's former NBC affiliation and is now KNSD, an NBC O&O.
August 14	NBC affiliate WRDU-TV changes its call sign to WPTF-TV, following Durham Life's purchase of the station.
August 16	Singer Elvis Presley dies in Memphis, Tennessee, at the age of 42. As a result, Elvis in Concert airs on CBS on October 3 that year to bad reviews.
September 5	In Baton Rouge, Louisiana, ABC affiliate WRBT (now WVLA-TV) and NBC affiliate WBRZ-TV swap affiliations. WBRZ-TV makes its move in search for stronger programming (ABC is, at the time, the nation's #1 rated television network, while NBC is in last place). The move is a precursor to similar events that will take place in the course of the next few years.
September 14	A tube top-clad woman named Yolanda Bowsley is called into Contestants' Row on the CBS game show The Price Is Right, and while running down her breasts pop out of her shirt. The incident was censored with a large blue bar but it is still remembered today. On the same episode, a new pricing game, named Secret "X", was introduced.
September 14	Cheryl Ladd is introduced as Kris Munroe, the younger sister of former Angel Jill Munroe (Farrah Fawcett-Majors) in the second season premiere of Charlie's Angels on ABC.
September 20	The third part of the three-part fifth season premiere of Happy Days airs on ABC. The episode is highlighted by a scene in which Fonzie literally jumps over a shark while on water-skis.
September 21	Eleven-year old Janet Jackson joins the cast of the CBS sitcom Good Times for its final two seasons as Penny Gordon, an upstairs neighbor who is abused by her biological mother (Chip Fields), later adopted by Willona (Ja'Net DuBois), in the four-part season opener "The Evans Get Involved". Comedian Johnny Brown, who recurred as the building superintendent Bookman from Seasons 2 to 4, also joins the main cast.
September 24	Marla Gibbs joins the cast of the CBS sitcom The Jeffersons as a series regular in the fourth season as fan-favorite Florence Johnston. Zara Cully, who portrayed Mother Jefferson, appears in only three episodes that season, prior to her death at age 86 in February 1978.
October 23	CBS affiliates WTEN in Albany, New York and WCDC in Adams, Massachusetts swap affiliations with ABC affiliate WAST after WTEN/WCDC's incoming owners Knight-Ridder sign an affiliation deal for the station with ABC.
October 24	A new Peanuts special, It's Your First Kiss, Charlie Brown, airs on CBS. It shows and names "Heather", the Little Red-Haired Girl, thereupon ending the 'mystery'.
November 6	KTVZ in Bend, Oregon signs-on as an NBC affiliate. Bend is technically still part of the Portland DMA at the time, but in 1981, it becomes its own television market.
November 30	CBS commentator Eric Sevareid bade farewell in his final two-minute segment on The CBS Evening News with Walter Cronkite, after 48 years at CBS News.
December 2	Billy Crystal sets a winner's circle record by getting the contestant to the top of the pyramid in 26 seconds on ABC's The $20,000 Pyramid. The record still stands today.
December 11	In Huntsville, Alabama, NBC affiliate WAAY-TV swaps affiliations with ABC affiliate WYUR-TV in search for stronger programming (at the time, NBC is in last place among the three major networks, and ABC is in first place).
December 17	Miskel Spillman, guest hosts an episode of NBC's Saturday Night Live. Spillman, who is at the time, an 80-year-old German immigrant and grandmother from New Orleans, won the only "Anyone Can Host" contest. She is to date, the only non-celebrity to host an episode of SNL. She was also, the oldest host in SNL's history until 88-year-old Betty White hosted on May 8, 2010. It is also in this episode that musical guest Elvis Costello halted his band the Attractions seven seconds into their scheduled performance of the song "Less Than Zero" in favor of "Radio Radio", which was a then unreleased song that was critical of mainstream broadcasting.

== Programs ==
=== Debuting this year ===
Date	Title	Network
January 3	Lovers and Friends	NBC
January 3	Shoot for the Stars	NBC
January 10	Circus of the Stars	CBS
January 17	Busting Loose	CBS
January 30	The Hardy Boys/Nancy Drew Mysteries	ABC
January 31	The Andros Targets	CBS
February 2	Quinn Martin's Tales of the Unexpected	NBC
February 18	Hunter	CBS
March 7	Second Chance	ABC
March 15	Eight Is Enough	ABC
March 15	Three's Company	ABC
March 20	Loves Me, Loves Me Not	CBS
March 23	How Do You Like Your Eggs?	QUBE
April 1	This Week in Baseball	Syndication
May 7	Quark	NBC
June 13	It's Anybody's Guess	NBC
July 6	Comedy Time	NBC
July 18	The Better Sex	ABC
August 3	The Kallikaks	NBC
September 5	The Fitzpatricks	CBS
September 10	Baggy Pants and the Nitwits	NBC
September 10	CB Bears	NBC
September 10	I Am the Greatest: The Adventures of Muhammad Ali	NBC
September 10	The New Archie and Sabrina Hour	NBC
September 10	The Red Hand Gang	NBC
September 10	Search and Rescue	NBC
September 10	Space Sentinels	NBC
September 10	Thunder	NBC
September 10	Scooby's All-Star Laff-A-Lympics	ABC
September 10	The Skatebirds	CBS
September 10	Space Academy	CBS
September 12	The Betty White Show	CBS
September 12	Young Dan'l Boone	CBS
September 12	Lucan	ABC
September 13	Soap	ABC
September 13	Mulligan's Stew	NBC
September 13	The Richard Pryor Show	NBC
September 14	Inside the NFL	HBO
September 15	Carter Country	ABC
September 15	CHiPs	NBC
September 16	Sanford Arms	NBC
September 16	Logan's Run	CBS
September 17	Operation Petticoat	ABC
September 19	The San Pedro Beach Bums	ABC
September 19	The Amazing Spider-Man	CBS
September 20	Lou Grant	CBS
September 21	The Oregon Trail	NBC
September 22	Man from Atlantis	NBC
September 24	The Love Boat	ABC
October 1	We've Got Each Other	CBS
October 3	Knockout	NBC
October 3	To Say the Least	NBC
October 9	On Our Own	CBS
October 27	James at 15	NBC
December 1	Pinwheel	Nickelodeon

=== Resuming this year ===
Title	Final aired	Previous network	New title	Returning network	Date of return
The Mickey Mouse Club	1959	ABC	The New Mickey Mouse Club	Syndication	January 17

=== Ending this year ===
Date	Title	Debut
January 7	New Howdy Doody Show	1976
January 26	The Practice	1976
March 3	The McLean Stevenson Show	1976
March 13	Delvecchio	1976
March 13	Phyllis	1975
March 18	Sanford and Son	1972
March 19	The Mary Tyler Moore Show	1970
March 30	The Streets of San Francisco	1972
April 13	Sirota's Court	1976
April 15	The Electric Company	1971
April 17	McCloud	1970
April 24	McMillan & Wife	1971
April 27	Loves Me, Loves Me Not	1977
May 16	The Andros Targets	1977
May 27	Hunter	1977
July 30	The Feather and Father Gang	1976
August 24	Quinn Martin's Tales of the Unexpected	1977
August 31	The Kallikaks	1977
September 1	Comedy Time	1977
September 2	Let's Make a Deal	1963
October 4	The Richard Pryor Show	1977
October 14	Sanford Arms	1977
November 16	Busting Loose	1977
November 30	The Oregon Trail	1977
December 3	Emergency!	1972
December 13	Mulligan's Stew	1977
December 19	The San Pedro Beach Bums	1977
December 30	Storybook Squares	1969

=== Changing networks ===
Show	Moved from	Moved to
The Bionic Woman	ABC	NBC
Wonder Woman	ABC	CBS
The Tony Randall Show	ABC	CBS
The Mickey Mouse Club	ABC	Syndication

=== Made-for-TV movies ===
Debut	Name	Network
May 13	The San Pedro Bums	ABC
October 10	Killer on Board	NBC
November 10	The Incredible Hulk	CBS
November 23	The Last of the Mohicans	NBC
November 26	The Hobbit	NBC
December 11	It Happened One Christmas	ABC

=== Miniseries ===
Debut	Name	Network
January 23	Roots	ABC
February 6	How the West Was Won	ABC
February 10	Seventh Avenue	NBC
March 10	The Rhinemann Exchange	ABC
April 3	Jesus of Nazareth	NBC

== Networks and services ==
=== Launches ===
Network	Type	Launch date	Notes	Source
CBN Satellite Channel	Satellite television	April 29		
Tri-State Christian Television	Cable television	May 20		
Madison Square Garden Sports Network	Cable television	September 22		

=== Conversions and rebrandings ===
There are no conversions and rebrandings for Cable and satellite television channels in this year.

=== Closures ===
There are no closures for Cable and satellite television channels in this year.

== Television stations ==
=== Sign-ons ===
Date	City of License/Market	Station	Channel	Affiliation	Notes/Ref.
January 17	Medford, Oregon	KSYS	8	PBS	
March 6	Plattsburgh, New York	WCFE-TV	57	PBS	
April	Corpus Christi, Texas	KORO	28	Spanish International Network	Now a Univision affiliate
April 10	Fresno, California	KMTF	18	PBS	
May 1	Mason City, Iowa	KYIN	24	PBS	Part of Iowa Public Television
June 30	Long Beach/Los Angeles, California	KSCI	18	Independent	
September 10	South Bend, Indiana	WHME	46	Independent	
October 17	Boston, Massachusetts	WXNE-TV	25	Independent	
October 21	Rock Springs, Wyoming	KTUX	13	CBS	
November 6	Bend, Oregon	KTVZ	21	NBC	
December 1	New Haven, Connecticut	WEDY	65	PBS	Part of Connecticut Public Television
December 8	Fayetteville, Arkansas	KTVP	29	CBS	
December 15	Park Falls/Superior, Wisconsin (Duluth, Minnesota)	WLEF-TV	36	PBS	Part of Wisconsin Public Television
December 21	Fort Wayne, Indiana	WFFT-TV	55	Independent	
December 28	Sheridan, Wyoming	KSGW-TV	12	NBC (primary); CBS (secondary)	Satellite of KOTA-TV/Rapid City, South Dakota
Unknown	New York City	W60AI	60	Independent	Signed on as a translator of WWHT

=== Network affiliation changes ===
Date	City of License/Market	Station	Channel	Old affiliation	New affiliation	Notes/Ref.
March 27	Milwaukee, Wisconsin	WISN-TV	12	CBS	ABC	
March 27	Milwaukee, Wisconsin	WITI	6	ABC	CBS	
June 27	San Diego, California	KCST-TV	39	ABC	NBC	These affiliation changes were part of ABC's retaliation for KCST-TV previously forcing the ABC affiliation to move to that station from XETV in nearby Tijuana, Baja California, Mexico, four years earlier.
June 27	San Diego, California	KGTV	10	NBC	ABC	These affiliation changes were part of ABC's retaliation for KCST-TV previously forcing the ABC affiliation to move to that station from XETV in nearby Tijuana, Baja California, Mexico, four years earlier.
September 5	Baton Rouge, Louisiana	WBRZ-TV	2	NBC	ABC	
September 5	Baton Rouge, Louisiana	WRBT	33	ABC	NBC	
October 23	Adams, Massachusetts	WCDC-TV	19	ABC	CBS	WCDC-TV is a satellite of WTEN/Albany, New York
October 23	Albany, New York	WTEN	10	ABC	CBS	
December 11	Huntsville, Alabama	WAAY-TV	31	NBC	ABC	
December 11	Huntsville, Alabama	WYUR	48	ABC	NBC	

=== Station closures ===
Date	City of License/Market	Station	Channel	Affiliation	Notes/Ref.
May 4	Fort Dodge, Iowa	KVFD-TV	21	NBC	November 23, 1953

== Births ==
Date	Name	Notability
January 7	Dustin Diamond	Actor (Saved by the Bell) (died 2021)
January 7	Cecilia Vega	American journalist
January 8	Amber Benson	Actress (Buffy the Vampire Slayer) and singer
January 18	Lloyd Ahlquist	American internet personality
January 19	Benjamin Ayres	Canadian actor (Saving Hope)
January 21	Jerry Trainor	Actor (Drake & Josh, iCarly, Wendell & Vinnie, T.U.F.F. Puppy, Bunsen Is a Beast)
January 26	Vince Carter	NBA basketball player
January 28	Joey Fatone	Singer and actor
January 29	Justin Hartley	Actor (Passions, Smallville, The Young and the Restless, This Is Us)
January 29	Sam Jaeger	Actor (Parenthood)
January 31	Bobby Moynihan	Actor and comedian (Saturday Night Live, We Bare Bears, DuckTales, Me, Myself & I)
January 31	Kerry Washington	Actress (Scandal)
February 2	Michael Koman	Writer
February 2	Shakira	Colombian singer (Dancing with Myself, The Voice)
February 3	Maitland Ward	Actress (The Bold and the Beautiful, Boy Meets World)
February 6	Josh Stewart	Actor
February 9	A. J. Buckley	Irish-born Canadian actor (CSI: NY)
February 14	Jim Jefferies	Actor and comedian
February 16	Paul Brittain	Actor and comedian (Saturday Night Live)
February 18	Ike Barinholtz	Actor (Mad TV, The Mindy Project)
February 18	Kristoffer Polaha	Actor
February 20	Stephon Marbury	NBA basketball players
February 21	Steve Francis	NBA basketball players
February 26	Greg Rikaart	Actor (The Young and the Restless)
March 3	Buddy Valastro	Baker
March 7	Mark Taylor	Actor
March 7	Heather McComb	Actress
March 8	Alison Becker	Actress (Mayne Street, Parks and Recreation)
March 8	James Van Der Beek	Actor (Dawson's Creek) (died 2026)
March 9	Rupert Evans	Actor
March 10	Jeff Branson	Actor (The Young and the Restless, All My Children, Guiding Light)
March 10	Bree Turner	Actress (Undressed, Grimm)
March 15	Brian Tee	Actor (Chicago Med)
March 17	Jorma Taccone	Actor
March 23	Joanna Page	Welsh actress (Gavin & Stacey, Poppy Cat, Q Pootle 5)
March 24	Jessica Chastain	Actress
March 26	Bianca Kajlich	Actress (Rules of Engagement, Undateable)
March 27	Malia Jones	Model
March 28	Annie Wersching	Actress (General Hospital, 24, Bosch, The Vampire Diaries) (died 2023)
March 31	Erica Tazel	Actress
April 1	Jon Gosselin	American former television personality
April 6	Teddy Sears	Actor (Raising the Bar, American Horror Story, Masters of Sex, The Flash)
April 10	Stephanie Sheh	Voice actress (Three Delivery, Peter Rabbit, The Legend of Korra)
April 12	Jordana Spiro	Actress (The Huntress, My Boys, The Mob Doctor)
April 12	Sarah Jane Morris	Actress (Brothers & Sisters)
April 14	Sarah Michelle Gellar	Actress (Swans Crossing, Buffy the Vampire Slayer, Ringer, The Crazy Ones)
April 14	Rob McElhenney	Actor (It's Always Sunny in Philadelphia)
April 18	Adam Sinclair	Actor
April 23	Eric Edelstein	Actor (Shameless, Monsters vs. Aliens, Clarence, We Bare Bears)
April 23	Kal Penn	Actor (House, Designated Survivor)
April 23	John Oliver	Actor
April 23	John Cena	Professional wrestler and actor
April 24	Eric Balfour	Actor (24, Haven) and singer
April 24	Rebecca Mader	Actress (Justice, Lost, Once Upon a Time)
April 25	Manolo Cardona	Actor
April 26	Jason Earles	Actor (Hannah Montana, Kickin' It, Hotel Du Loone)
April 26	McKenzie Westmore	Actress (Passions, All My Children)
April 26	Tom Welling	Actor (Smallville)
April 26	Leonard Earl Howze	Actor
April 28	Zeb Wells	Writer
April 29	Brandon McMillan	American television personality
April 30	Alexandra Holden	Actress
May 2	Jenna von Oÿ	Actress (Blossom)
May 3	Jeffrey Garcia	Voice actor (The Adventures of Jimmy Neutron, Boy Genius, Back at the Barnyard, Planet Sheen)
May 10	Todd Lowe	Actor (Gilmore Girls, True Blood)
May 12	Rebecca Herbst	Actress (Days of Our Lives, General Hospital)
May 12	Rachel Wilson	Canadian actress (Heather on Total Drama)
May 13	Neil Hopkins	Actor (Lost)
May 13	Brian Thomas Smith	Actor
May 13	Samantha Morton	Actress
May 16	Adam MacDonald	Actor
May 16	Lynn Collins	Actress
May 20	Matt Czuchry	Actor (Gilmore Girls, The Good Wife)
May 23	Heather Wahlquist	Actress
May 23	Lisa Joy	Screenwriter
May 23	Richard Ayoade	English actor (Gadget Man, Strange Hill High, Apple & Onion)
May 25	Alberto Del Rio	Pro wrestler
May 27	Shanola Hampton	Actress
May 28	Elisabeth Hasselbeck	Talk show host
May 28	Brian Friedman	Dancer
May 29	Rory Albanese	Writer
May 31	Eric Christian Olsen	Actor (NCIS: Los Angeles, Kick Buttowski: Suburban Daredevil)
June 1	Sarah Wayne Callies	Actress (Prison Break, The Walking Dead, Colony)
June 1	Danielle Harris	Actress (The Wild Thornberrys, That's Life, Father of the Pride)
June 2	Zachary Quinto	Actor (Heroes, American Horror Story)
June 2	AJ Styles	Pro wrestler
June 5	Navi Rawat	Actress (The O.C., Numb3rs)
June 5	Liza Weil	Actress (Gilmore Girls, How to Get Away with Murder)
June 6	Amber Nash	American actress
June 8	Kanye West	American rapper
June 11	Ryan Dunn	American stunt performer (Jackass, Viva La Bam) (died 2011)
June 14	Sullivan Stapleton	Australian actor (Blindspot)
June 17	Lauren Pritchard	Comic actress (Mad TV)
June 20	Amos Lee	Singer
June 28	Bob Smiley	Writer
June 28	Hua Hsu	Writer
June 29	Zuleikha Robinson	British actress (Lost, Rome) and singer
June 30	Colton Dunn	Comedian, actor and writer (Superstore)
July 1	Liv Tyler	Actress (The Leftovers)
July 2	John Paesano	Composer
July 4	Stephen Rannazzisi	Actor
July 7	Jessica Chobot	Host
July 8	Milo Ventimiglia	Actor (Gilmore Girls, Heroes, This Is Us)
July 12	Steve Howey	Actor (Reba, Shameless)
July 12	Brock Lesnar	Wrestler and mixed martial artist
July 13	Ashley Scott	Actress (Dark Angel, Birds of Prey, Jericho)
July 13	Kari Wahlgren	Voice actress (Super Robot Monkey Team Hyperforce Go!, Naruto, Ben 10, Legion of Super Heroes, The Fairly OddParents)
July 15	Lana Parrilla	Actress (Spin City, Boomtown, Windfall, Swingtown, Miami Medical, Once Upon a Time)
July 16	Raney Shockne	Composer
July 18	Kelly Reilly	British actress (Black Box, True Detective, Under Suspicion)
July 18	Luis Moncada	Actor
July 19	Gennifer Hutchison	Writer
July 19	Erin Cummings	Actress
July 23	Shane McRae	Actor
July 26	Tony Sampson	Canadian voice actor (Eddy on Ed, Edd n Eddy)
July 26	Daniel Sea	Actor
July 27	Jason Zimbler	Actor (Clarissa Explains It All)
July 27	Rich Blomquist	Actor
July 27	Jonathan Rhys Meyers	Actor
July 29	Rodney Jerkins	Rapper
July 30	Jaime Pressly	Actress (My Name Is Earl, I Hate My Teenage Daughter, Mom)
July 30	Mike Seal	Actor
August 2	Edward Furlong	Actor (CSI: NY)
August 2	Artemis Pebdani	Actress
August 3	Tom Brady	Quarterback in the NFL
August 6	Joe DeRosa	Actor
August 8	Lindsay Sloane	Actress (Sabrina the Teenage Witch)
August 8	Michael Chernus	Actor
August 11	Toby Chu	American film composer
August 15	Nicole Paggi	Actress (Hope & Faith)
August 17	Emily Schulman	Actress (Small Wonder)
August 19	Callum Blue	English actor (Smallville, Dead Like Me, The Tudors)
August 19	Brooke Mueller	Actress
August 19	T. J. Holmes	American journalist
August 25	Jonathan Togo	Actor (CSI: Miami)
August 28	Adam Rayner	English actor
August 30	Michael Gladis	Actor
August 31	Jeff Hardy	Pro wrestler
September 1	Adrienne Wilkinson	Actress (Venice: The Series, Suspense)
September 2	Jimmy Smith	Fighter
September 7	Steve Borst	Writer
September 8	Nate Corddry	Actor
September 11	Jackie Buscarino	Voice actress (The Marvelous Misadventures of Flapjack, Adventure Time, Gravity Falls, Steven Universe)
September 11	Ludacris	Rapper and actor
September 11	Todd Williams	Actor
September 15	Kenny Blank	Actor (The Parent 'Hood, As Told by Ginger) and singer
September 15	Marisa Ramirez	Actress
September 17	Jim Conroy	Voice Actor (Celebrity Deathmatch, Kenny the Shark, Fetch! with Ruff Ruffman, Jellystone!, The Cuphead Show!)
September 18	Barrett Foa	Actor (NCIS: Los Angeles)
September 18	Sara Haines	American television host
September 19	Erica Ash	Actress (Mad TV, The Big Gay Sketch Show)
September 24	Elizabeth Bogush	Actress (Titans, The Mountain)
September 24	Alexis DeJoria	Racer
September 25	Dave Jeser	Writer (Drawn Together)
September 25	Clea DuVall	Actress
September 26	Sirena Irwin	Voice actress (SpongeBob SquarePants, Stripperella, Batman: The Brave and the Bold, Pig Goat Banana Cricket)
September 27	Mike Maronna	Actor (The Adventures of Pete & Pete)
October 11	Matt Bomer	Actor (Guiding Light, Tru Calling, Chuck, White Collar)
October 11	Rhett McLaughlin	TV host
October 13	Paul Pierce	NBA basketball player
October 13	Kiele Sanchez	Actress (Married to the Kellys, Lost, Related, The Glades, Kingdom)
October 14	Agata Gotova	Actress
October 17	Alimi Ballard	Actor (Numb3rs, The Catch)
October 17	Jason Reitman	Actor
October 20	Jennifer Hall	Actress (Up All Night)
October 20	Sam Witwer	Actor (Smallville, Battlestar Galactica, Being Human)
October 26	Jon Heder	Voice actor (Star vs. the Forces of Evil, Pickle and Peanut, Home: Adventures with Tip and Oh)
October 26	Chaz Lamar Shepherd	Actor (7th Heaven, The Game)
October 27	Mat Lucas	Voice actor (Star Wars: Clone Wars)
October 29	Brendan Fehr	Canadian actor (Roswell, CSI: Miami)
November 2	Gabriella Pession	Actress
November 2	Jason Cerbone	Actor
November 4	Liz Cackowski	Actress
November 4	Lindsay Czarniak	American sports anchor and reporter
November 10	Brittany Murphy	Actress (Drexell's Class, King of the Hill) (d. 2009)
November 10	Lea Moreno Young	Actress (Legacy, Brutally Normal, DAG)
November 14	Brian Dietzen	Actors (NCIS)
November 15	Sean Murray	Actors (NCIS)
November 16	Gigi Edgley	Australian actress (Farscape, The Secret Life of Us, Rescue Special Ops)
November 16	Maggie Gyllenhaal	Actress, singer and sister of Jake Gyllenhaal
November 17	Scoot McNairy	Actor
November 17	Mike Cernovich	TV host
November 18	Miranda Raison	British actress (MI-5, Spotless)
November 19	Reid Scott	Actor (It's All Relative, My Boys, Motorcity, Veep)
November 19	Sanaa Hamri	Director
November 20	Josh Turner	Actor
November 24	Colin Hanks	Actor
November 25	Jill Flint	Actress (Royal Pains, The Night Shift)
November 27	Alex Wagner	American journalist
November 30	Nelsan Ellis	Actor (True Blood) (d. 2017)
December 1	Nate Torrence	Actor (Motorcity, Hello Ladies, Star vs. the Forces of Evil)
December 1	Akiva Schaffer	Actor
December 3	David Iserson	Screenwriter
December 5	Matt Gutman	American reporter
December 6	Lindsey Alley	Actress (The Mickey Mouse Club, On the Patio)
December 7	Big Jay Oakerson	Actor
December 10	Netfa Perry	Actress (The Steve Harvey Show)
December 12	Colin White	Canadian former professional ice hockey player
December 15	Geoff Stults	Actor (7th Heaven)
December 17	Katheryn Winnick	Canadian actress (Vikings)
December 24	Michael Raymond-James	Actor (True Blood, Terriers, Once Upon a Time)
December 28	Michael Spears	Actor
December 29	Katherine Moennig	Actress (The L Word, Three Rivers, Ray Donovan)
December 30	Lucy Punch	Actress (The Class, Ben and Kate)
December 31	Donald Trump Jr.	Television presenter

== Deaths ==
Date	Name	Age	Notability
January 28	Burt Mustin	92	Actor (Leave It to Beaver)
January 29	Freddie Prinze	22	Actor and comedian (Chico and the Man)
February 28	Eddie "Rochester" Anderson	71	Comedian (The Jack Benny Program)
March 27	Diana Hyland	41	Actress (The Fugitive, Peyton Place)
April 21	Gummo Marx	84	Actor
June 13	Matthew Garber	21	English actor (Mary Poppins)
June 14	Alan Reed	69	Actor (original voice of Fred Flintstone on The Flintstones)
August 16	Elvis Presley	42	Singer and actor (The Ed Sullivan Show)
August 17	Quincy Howe	76	Journalist and presidential debate moderator
August 19	Groucho Marx	86	Comedian, television host (You Bet Your Life)
August 22	Sebastian Cabot	59	Actor (Family Affair)
August 29	Jean Hagen	54	Actress (Make Room for Daddy)
October 14	Bing Crosby	74	Singer, actor, TV producer (Hogan's Heroes)

== Television debuts ==
- Jack Angel – The All-New Super Friends Hour
- Rosanna Arquette – Having Babies II
- Christine Baranski – Busting Loose
- Carole Bouquet – La famille Cigale
- Sofia Coppola – The Godfather Saga
- Robert Davi – Contract on Cherry Street
- Robert De Niro – The Godfather Saga
- Brian Dennehy – Kojak
- Robert Englund – The Hardy Boys/Nancy Drew Mysteries:Mystery of the Fallen Angels
- Adam Godley – The Ballad of Salomon Pavey
- William Hurt – Kojak
- Nastassja Kinski – Tatort
- Jennifer Jason Leigh – Baretta
- David Margulies – Kojak
- Joe Pantoliano – McNamara's Band
- Mandy Patinkin – Charleston
- Annie Potts – Black Market Baby
- Dennis Quaid – Baretta
- Jennifer Savidge – James at 16
- John Shea – Eight Is Enough
- Meryl Streep – The Deadliest Season
- Jeffrey Tambor – Kojak
- Christoph Waltz – Am dam des
- Ray Winstone – Scum
- John Witherspoon – The Richard Pryor Show
