= James at 15 =

American drama television series

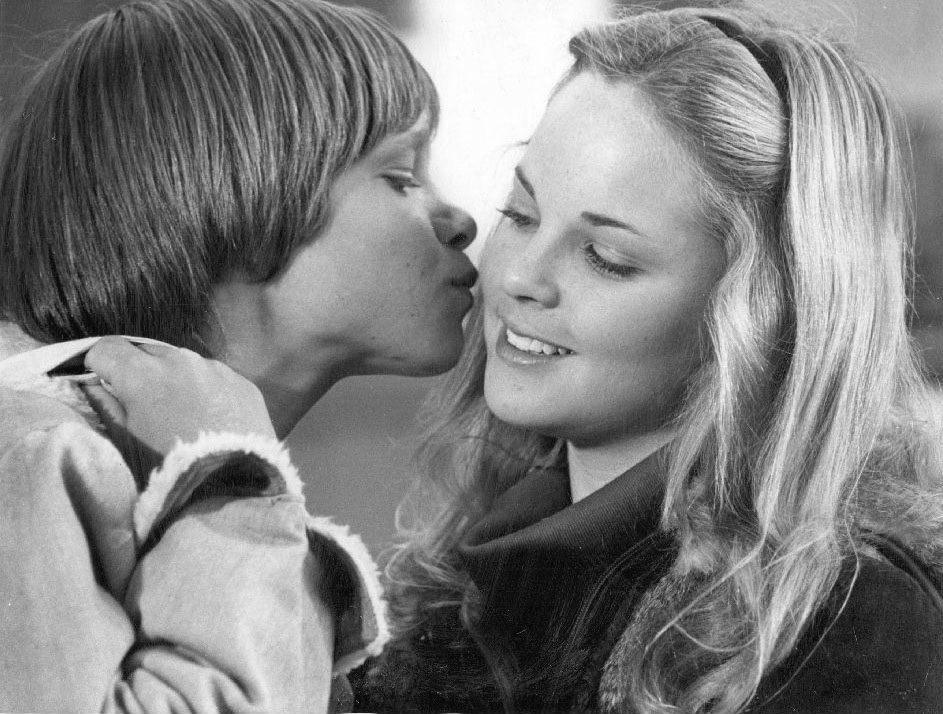
- Lance Kerwin and Melissa Sue Anderson in the pilot movie James at 15
- Also known as: James at 16
- Genre: Drama
- Created by: Dan Wakefield
- Written by: Wally Dalton; Bill Nuss; Dan Wakefield; Shelley Zellman
- Directed by: Marc Daniels; Joseph Hardy; Peter Levin; Ernest A. Losso; Ernest Pintoff; James Sheldon; George Tyne
- Starring: Lance Kerwin; Linden Chiles; Lynn Carlin; Kim Richards; David Hubbard; Deirdre Berthrong
- Theme music composer: John Ford Coley
- Opening theme: "James" performed by Lee Montgomery
- Composers: Richard Baskin; Miles Goodman; Jimmie Haskell; Murray MacLeod; J.A.C. Redford
- Country of origin: United States
- Original language: English
- No. of seasons: 1
- No. of episodes: 1 movie / 20 episodes

Production
- Executive producers: Joseph Hardy; Martin Manulis
- Producers: Ernest A. Losso; Ronald Rubin
- Camera setup: Single-camera
- Running time: 45–48 minutes
- Production company: 20th Century Fox Television

Original release
- Network: NBC
- Release: September 5, 1977
- Release: October 27, 1977 – June 29, 1978

James at 15 (later James at 16) is an American drama series that aired on NBC during the 1977–78 season.

The series was preceded by the 1977 TV movie James at 15, which aired on Monday September 5, 1977 and was intended as a television pilot for the series. Both were written by Dan Wakefield, a journalist and fiction writer whose novel Going All the Way, a tale of coming of age in the 1950s, had led to his being contacted by David Sontag of Twentieth Century Fox.

Sontag, the senior vice-president of creative affairs at Fox, had had a lunch meeting in New York City with Paul Klein, the head of programming at NBC. Klein said he needed a series for Sunday night. On the spot, Sontag pitched the idea for a coming-of-age series seen through the eyes of a teenage boy, including his dreams, fantasies, and hopes. Klein loved the idea and asked Sontag who would write it, with Sontag's suggesting Dan Wakefield. Despite this unsourced account of the "creation" of the series, Sontag created no characters, no plotlines, and no settings. The on-screen credit for the series reads "Created by Dan Wakefield," as it was Wakefield who worked out the specifics from Sontag's general conceptual outline.

== Synopsis ==
James Hunter (Lance Kerwin) is the son of a college professor (Linden Chiles) who has moved his family across the country to take a teaching job, transplanting James from Oregon to Boston, Massachusetts. James, who had Walter Mitty-like dreams and dabbles in photography, has a hard time fitting into his new surroundings. During the series run, when James turned 16, the title was updated accordingly. (11 episodes, counting the two-hour movie, were produced as James at 15, with the remaining 10 airing as James at 16.)

Wakefield, who was born and raised in Indianapolis but eventually moved to Boston, said he chose Boston both because he wanted to write about a city he knew well and because he was tired of television's tendency to give programs settings in Los Angeles or New York City. To update his own memories of growing up, the writer spoke with adolescents from Boston.

== Cast ==
- Lance Kerwin as James Hunter
- Linden Chiles as Paul Hunter, James' father
- Lynn Carlin as Joan Hunter, James' mother
- Kim Richards as Sandy Hunter, James' sister
- Deirdre Berthrong as Kathy Hunter, James' sister
- David Raynr as Ludwig "Sly" Hazeltine, James' friend (billed as David Hubbard)
- Susan Myers as Marlene Mahoney, James' friend
- Kevin Van Wieringen as a deaf student in James' class

== TV movie ==
The movie premiered to high ratings, topping the ratings for the week of September 5–11, 1977, with a 42% share of the viewing audience, quickly prompting NBC to approve a series. Associated Press writer Jerry Buck wrote that the pilot movie "captures the essence of growing up in America," adding "It makes up for all the drivel we've had to put up with, such as Sons and Daughters and Hollywood High."

== Critical reception and controversy ==
The show was highly praised for its realism and sensitivity, with a reviewer from The New York Times applauding the program's avoidance of stereotyping characters: "Sly, a jiving black student...has solidly middle-class parents deeply involved in classical music" and a classmate discovers that her father makes more money as a plumber than James' professor father. Tom Shales of The Washington Post wrote:

Not perfect, not revolutionary, not always deliriously urgent, James at 15 is still the most respectable new entertainment series of the season. Consistently, it communicates something about the state of being young, rather than just communicating that it wishes to lure young viewers. And if it romanticizes adolescence through the weekly trials and triumphs of its teen-age hero, at least it does so in more ambitious, inquisitive and authentic ways than the average TV teeny-bop.

Critics also approved of its handling of James' first sexual experience, with a Swedish exchange student (Kirsten Baker) in the episode which aired February 9, 1978— at which point the show assumed the name James at 16. However, head writer Wakefield quit in a dispute with NBC over the use of the euphemism "responsible" for "birth control" in the episode as well as the network's insistence that James should feel remorse over his decision.

Behind the scenes, Martin Manulis and Joe Hardy, the show's original executive producers, were replaced by Ron Rubin in December 1977. Despite the critical acclaim, the show lasted only one season. Kerwin was age 16 when the series began and had turned 17 when it was canceled.

== Awards and nominations ==
Year	Award	Result	Category	Recipient
1978	Primetime Emmy Award	Nominated	Outstanding Lead Actress for a Single Appearance in a Drama or Comedy Series	Irene Tedrow (for the episode "Ducks")
1978	Primetime Emmy Award	Nominated	Outstanding Lead Actress for a Single Appearance in a Drama or Comedy Series	Kate Jackson (for the episode "Pilot")
1978	Directors Guild of America Award	Nominated	Outstanding Directorial Achievement in Dramatic Series' - Night	Joseph Hardy (for the "Friends")

== Novelization ==
Two novels were written by author April Smith: James at 15 and Friends.

== Legacy ==
Kevin Williamson, the creator of Dawson's Creek, cited this show as a major influence on him and named it as an inspiration for his show. Williamson said, "Dawson's Creek came out of my desire to do James at 15 for the '90s. It was very provocative and way ahead of its time."

The Beastie Boys refer to the show in their song "Hey Ladies" ("I'm not James at 15 or Chachi in charge..."), from the album Paul's Boutique.

The title of The Breakup Society's 2004 album James at 35 is a reference to James at 15.
