= Hollywood High (1977 film) =

1977 film by Patrick Wright

- Directed by: Patrick Wright
- Produced by: Peter Perry Jr.
- Starring: Rae Sperling; Marcy Albrecht; Sherry Hardin; Susanne Severeid
- Cinematography: Jonathan Silveira
- Edited by: Marco Perri
- Music by: Scott Gale
- Release date: 1977
- Running time: 81 minutes
- Country: United States
- Language: English
- Box office: $1,251,000

Hollywood High is a 1977 American sex comedy film. The film is generally regarded as being of very low quality, with one retrospective review calling it "a shockingly inept piece of teen sexploitation". Another review "Even for a dubious genre like this, this movie reaches a level of badness that would make even the most jaded exploitation filmmakers pause, and subsequently resolve never to reach such a low point. Practically every department in this movie - acting, writing, directing, etc. - is at the very bottom of the barrel." Despite its poor reception, the movie had the unofficial sequel Hollywood High Part 2 released in 1981, which likewise was panned.

== Unrelated series pilot ==
Turner Classic Movies notes the existence of an unrelated 30-minute television pilot, also debuting in 1977, for a prospective series, which aired as part of NBC's Comedy Time, a summer series of unsold pilots.
