= Dog and Cat =

- Created by: Walter Hill
- Starring: Lou Antonio; Kim Basinger; Matt Clark
- Opening theme: Barry Devorzon
- Country of origin: United States
- No. of episodes: 6

Production
- Executive producer: Lawrence Gordon
- Producer: Robert Singer
- Running time: 74 minutes
- Production companies: Largo Productions; Paramount Network Television

Original release
- Network: ABC
- Release: March 5 – May 14, 1977

Dog and Cat is an American television series that aired on ABC on Saturday night at 10:00 p.m. Eastern time in 1977.

== Premise ==
Sgt. Jack Ramsey (Lou Antonio), an undercover detective with the Los Angeles Police Department, teams up with a partner named J.Z. Kane (Kim Basinger). Together they form a relationship based on friendship and trust (completely platonic) that leads them to capture many of L.A.'s criminals. Lieutenant Arthur Kipling (Matt Clark) is their boss.

"Dog and Cat" is a slang term used by police officers to denote a male-female partnership. The show is especially remembered for the car that Kim Basinger used in the series: a souped-up Volkswagen Beetle with a Porsche engine.

== Production history ==
Lawrence Gordon pitched the show to ABC, who bought it. He took it to Paramount, who produced it. The show was one of the first supervised by Brandon Tartikoff when he was at ABC.

It replaced Most Wanted which moved to Monday night.

Walter Hill wrote the pilot which was then rewritten and Hill took credit under a pseudonym. Reviewing Hill's pilot script Filmink wrote "for all of Hill’s stylistic uniqueness on the page, [it is] a perfectly serviceable ‘70s American cop show. It moves along at a brisk pace and is logically worked out... Its chief flaw, in our opinion, is that Hill doesn’t do much with the central concept."

== Reception ==
=== Critical ===
The New York Times described one of the earliest episodes, "Live Bait", about a rapist, as "a particularly repulsive tale" and thought the male lead was a rip-off of Baretta and the female lead too obviously inspired by Charlie's Angels.

The Washington Post said Antonio does "a nice, grumpy job" and Basinger was "a little saltier than Angie Dickinson's Pepper" but liked the fact it was not overly violent and "had a sense of humour. It could be around in the fall".

Filmink argued the lead actors were not well cast as a team.

=== Ratings ===
The first episode after the pilot was meant to be "Live Bait" (directed by Steve Stern, written by Rudolph Borchert), about a rapist. However it was changed to be about a corrupt policeman. It got a 40% rating and was the 23rd most watched show of the week.

Joel Silver reported that Walter Hill's original pilot script inspired Shane Black to write Lethal Weapon.

== Credits ==
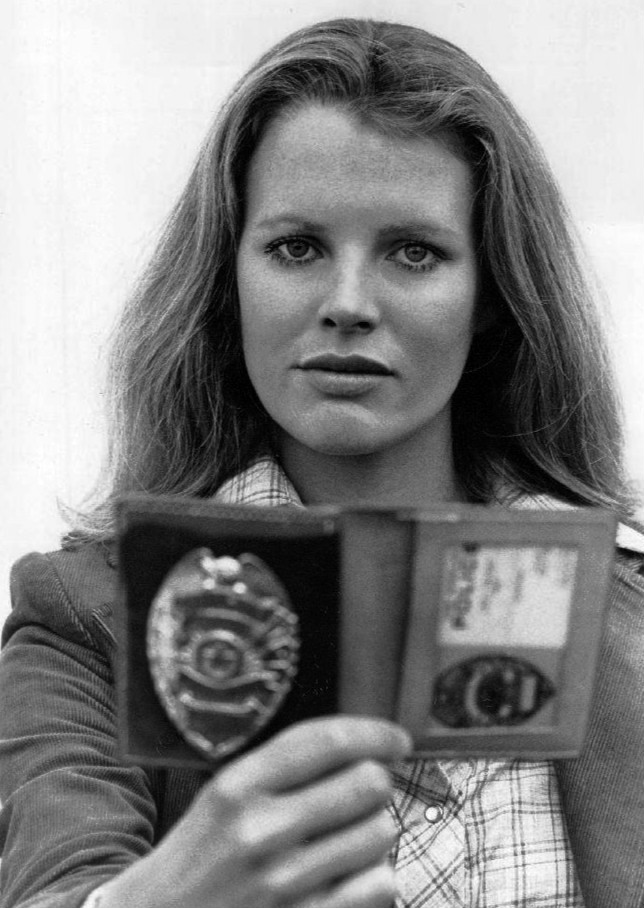
Basinger as J.Z. Kane in the show.

Directed by:

- Bob Kelljan

Writing credits (in alphabetical order)

- Heywood Gould
- Tom Greene
- Walter Hill
- William Keys
- Owen Morgan (also story)
- Henry Rosenbaum

Credited cast

- Lou Antonio as Jack Ramsey
- Kim Basinger as Officer J.Z. Kane
- Matt Clark as Lt. Arthur Kipling
- Charles Cioffi as Ralph Travan
- Richard Lynch as Shirley
- Dale Robinette as Nicholas Evans
- Janit Baldwin as Roeanne Lee Peters
- Geoffrey Scott as David Storey
- Lesley Woods as Velma
- Matt Bennett as Gonzo
- Walt Davis as Trog
- Dick Wesson as Zink Kauffen

The rest of cast listed alphabetically:

- Lynn Borden as Mavis
- Richard Forbes as Earl Seagram
- James Hall as Frank
- Dianne Kay as Connie
- Frank McRae as Morgue Attendant
- Catherane Skillen
- Jim Storm as Change Maker
- Ken Sylk as Doty
- Betty Thomas as Waitress

== Episode guide ==
No.	Title	Directed by	Written by	Original release date
0	"Pilot"	Robert Kelljan	Walter Hill	March 5, 1977
Pilot episode: When his partner is shot, a police detective (Lou Antonio) reluctantly accepts a slightly kooky lady replacement (Kim Basinger). Guest stars: Charles Cioffi, Richard Lynch, Dale Robinette, Dick Wesson
1	"Dead Dog and Cat"	Unknown	Unknown	March 12, 1977
J.Z.and Jack hunt a hood who's accused of peddling stolen diamonds. Guest stars: Charles Siebert, Jennifer Shaw, Gary W. Giem, Dennis McMullan
2	"Live Bait"	Steven H. Stein	Rudolph Borchert	March 19, 1977
Important women are the victims of a rapist. Guest stars: Alan Feinstein, John Karlen, Lou Elias, Tracy Brooks Swope, Robert Symonds
3	"A Duck Is a Duck"	Unknown	Unknown	April 9, 1977
Thieves have bad luck when they steal from a mob chief. Guest stars: Gerrit Graham, Scott Edmund Lane, Alex Rocco, Barbara Cason, Margie Gordon
4	"Brother Death"	Unknown	Unknown	April 16, 1977
A murder gets caught on film by a photographer who decides to use the evidence as blackmail. Guest stars: Richard Mulligan, John Krokes, Joseph Stern, Tannis G. Montgomery, Gary Wood, Ron Burke
5	"Dead Skunk"	Unknown	Unknown	April 23, 1977
Guest stars: Clu Gulager, Shannon Wilcox, Normann Burton, Richard Roar, Charles Cyphers, Conrad Janis
6	"Yesterday's Woman"	Unknown	Unknown	May 14, 1977
A socialite with a gambling problem steals from a loan shark. Guest stars: Susan Sullivan, Mark Goddard, Luke Andreas, Peter Mark Richman, Gene Conforti, Cliff Carnell
