= Sugar Time! =

- Genre: Sitcom
- Created by: James Komack
- Directed by: Tom Trbovich
- Starring: Barbi Benton; Marianne Black; Didi Carr; Wynn Irwin
- Opening theme: "Girls, Girls, Girls" by Barbi Benton, Marianne Black & Didi Carr
- Composer: Paul Williams
- Country of origin: United States
- Original language: English
- No. of seasons: 1
- No. of episodes: 13 (2 unaired)

Production
- Running time: 30 min
- Production company: The Komack Company

Original release
- Network: ABC
- Release: August 13, 1977 – May 29, 1978

Sugar Time! is a television comedy series produced by James Komack. The show was about an aspiring female rock group. Barbi Benton starred as Maxx Douglass, a hatcheck girl as well as the lead of an all-female rock band trying to break into the music business. The show also starred Marianne Black and Didi Carr.

== Cast ==
- Barbi Benton as Maxx Douglas, a hatcheck girl and member of the rock band Sugar.
- Marianne Black as Maggie Barton, a dental hygienist and member of Sugar.
- Didi Carr as Diane Zuckerman, a dance instructor and member of Sugar.
- Wynn Irwin as Al Marks, owner of The Tryout Room, the nightclub in which Sugar performed gratis.

== Episodes ==
No.	Title	Original release date
1	"The Breakup"	August 13, 1977
2	"Witty, Urbane and Erudite"	August 20, 1977
3	"Maggie's Long Date"	August 27, 1977
4	"Fear of Heckling"	September 3, 1977
5	"Guy and Dolls"	November 14, 1977
6	"Sugar to the Rescue"	April 10, 1978
7	"Free Again"	April 17, 1978
8	"Sugar Baby"	April 24, 1978
9	"Testing Maxx"	May 1, 1978
10	"Punk Rock"	May 22, 1978
11	"Maggie and Al: A Love Story"	May 29, 1978
12	"Occupational Hazard"	Unaired
13	"How to Be in Business Without Really Succeeding"	Unaired
