= A Year at the Top =

American television series (1977)

- Genre: Fantasy; Sitcom; Music
- Created by: Heywood Kling
- Written by: Heywood Kling; Sandy Veith
- Directed by: Marlene Laird; Alan Rafkin
- Starring: Paul Shaffer; Greg Evigan
- Theme music composer: Howard Greenfield; Paul Shaffer
- Composer: Greg Evigan
- Country of origin: United States
- Original language: English
- No. of seasons: 1
- No. of episodes: 5

Production
- Executive producers: Norman Lear; Don Kirshner
- Producers: Patricia Fass Palmer; Darryl Hickman
- Running time: 22–24 minutes
- Production companies: Don Kirshner Productions; TAT Communications Company; Tandem Productions

Original release
- Network: CBS
- Release: August 5 – September 2, 1977

A Year at the Top is an American sitcom that aired for five episodes on CBS from August 5 to September 2, 1977. Produced by T.A.T. Communications Company, the series was created by Heywood Kling and co-executive produced by Don Kirshner and Norman Lear.

== Synopsis ==
Based on the Faust legend, the series stars Paul Shaffer and Greg Evigan as two struggling musicians who make a pact with the son of the devil for a year of success. A Year at the Top also stars Nedra Volz, Priscilla Morrill, Gabriel Dell, and Julie Cobb. Mickey Rooney guest-starred on the pilot episode. The series aired for only five episodes before being canceled by CBS in September 1977.

Expecting the series to be a hit, a soundtrack LP titled Greg & Paul - A Year At The Top was released by Casablanca Records (#NBLP-7068). The album's executive producer was Don Kirshner.

== Cast ==
- Greg Evigan as Greg
- Paul Shaffer as Paul
- Gabriel Dell as Frederick J. Hanover (aka "The Devil's Son")
- Julie Cobb as Trish
- Priscilla Morrill as Miss Worley
- Nedra Volz as Grandma Belle Durbin

== Episodes ==
Episode #	Episode title	Original airdate
1-1	"Pilot"	August 5, 1977
1-2	"The Contracts"	August 12, 1977
1-3	"Tightrope"	August 20, 1977
1-4	"The Visits"	August 26, 1977
1-5	"Gray is Beautiful"	September 2, 1977
