= 3 Girls 3 =

- Created by: Kenny Solms, Gail Parent
- Written by: Kenny Solms, Gail Parent, Ed Scharlach, Ann Elder, Pat Proft, Tony Peyser and Don Hinkley
- Directed by: Tim Kiley
- Starring: Debbie Allen, Ellen Foley, and Mimi Kennedy
- Opening theme: "3 Girls 3"
- Ending theme: "Can We Get Together Again?"
- Country of origin: United States
- Original language: English
- No. of seasons: 1
- No. of episodes: 4

Production
- Executive producers: Gary Smith and Dwight Hemion
- Producers: Kenny Solms, Gail Parent
- Running time: 60 min

Original release
- Network: NBC
- Release: March 30, 1977 – June 1977

3 Girls 3 is a 1977 American variety television show that ran for four episodes on the NBC network, starring Debbie Allen, Ellen Foley, and Mimi Kennedy. All three were unknown talents at the time, and this "overnight stardom" line was the premise of the show.

== Creation ==
Television writer Kenny Solms came up with the concept of the show in about 1973, wanting to highlight the "Cinderella" aspect of overnight stardom using unknown actors. He collaborated with writing partner Gail Parent, with whom he had many writing credits for shows including The Carol Burnett Show, and had created The Tim Conway Show. They came up with a script called Chorus Line, and pitched it to ABC. ABC wanted to use established stars instead of unknowns, which was counter to the premise of the show, so the project went dormant. In April 1976, CBS demonstrated interest in the show, but wanted to retool it for one actress (Diahann Carroll) instead of three. Solms and Parent then went to the remaining United States television network, NBC, which bought the proposed show in September 1976. Solms and Parent auditioned over 250 women in Los Angeles and 50 more in New York for the lead roles.

== Run and reception ==
The one-hour show debuted on March 30, 1977, and television critic John J. O'Connor of The New York Times and other critics gave highly positive reviews of the show. O'Connor called it "easily the freshest, liveliest and most exciting premiere of a series that television has concocted in years."

The opening episode also received respectable ratings. Moreover, the episode announced that the show would be returning, but NBC had already decided it would pull the plug. The second episode was not aired the following week, reportedly because the network did not like the show's concept, or alternatively because NBC claimed that improved ratings for C.P.O. Sharkey, a show the network had originally intended to replace, led to the cancellation.

After getting many complaints, NBC announced that the three remaining episodes would be aired in June. The summer-season ratings were not good, and the show was not picked up for further episodes.
