= The Diahann Carroll Show =

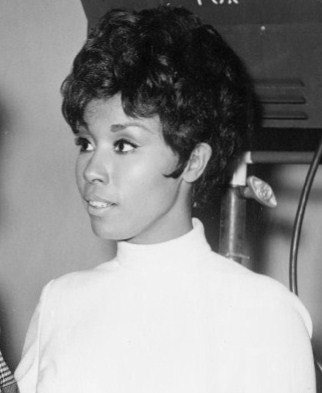
- Diahann Carroll
- Starring: Diahann Carroll
- Country of origin: United States
- No. of episodes: 4

Production
- Running time: 60 (including commercials)
- Production company: SuMo

Original release
- Network: CBS
- Release: August 14 – September 4, 1976

The Diahann Carroll Show is a series of four musical variety television specials, starring Diahann Carroll, that aired on CBS in 1976. The show was a summer replacement for The Carol Burnett Show.

The series' four episodes were taped over a period of five days. Guests on the premiere episode included Telly Savalas and Sammy Davis Jr (with whom Carroll sang a medley of songs from Porgy and Bess). Other guests during the brief season included composer Marvin Hamlisch, Betty White, Phyllis Diller and Johnny Mathis. Carroll's costumes were designed by Bob Mackie.

Reviews were generally positive where Carroll's performance was concerned, but the limited production values (due to the show's small budget) and scripting were less well received.

At the time, Carroll told Jet magazine that "Considering the facts that we filmed four one-hour shows in only five days, I must say that I am very proud of what we have .... It was hard work, but I wouldn't have missed the experience for the world and I hope that television audiences will feel as good about the shows as we do."
