= Hunter (1977 TV series) =

1977 United States dramatic television series

- Genre: Drama
- Created by: William Blinn
- Starring: James Franciscus; Linda Evans; Ralph Bellamy
- Opening theme: Richard Shores
- Ending theme: Richard Shores
- Composers: Richard Shores; Richard Markowtiz
- Country of origin: United States
- Original language: English
- No. of seasons: 1
- No. of episodes: 13 (4 unaired)

Production
- Executive producer: David Gerber
- Running time: 60 minutes
- Production company: Lorimar Productions

Original release
- Network: CBS
- Release: February 18 – May 27, 1977

Hunter is a 1977 American drama television series starring James Franciscus and Linda Evans which centered on the exploits of a pair of undercover counterespionage agents. It aired from February 18 to May 27, 1977, on CBS.

== Cast ==
- James Franciscus as James Hunter
- Linda Evans as Marty Shaw
- Ralph Bellamy as General Baker

== Plot ==
Linda Evans as Marty Shaw and James Franciscus as James Hunter in Hunter.

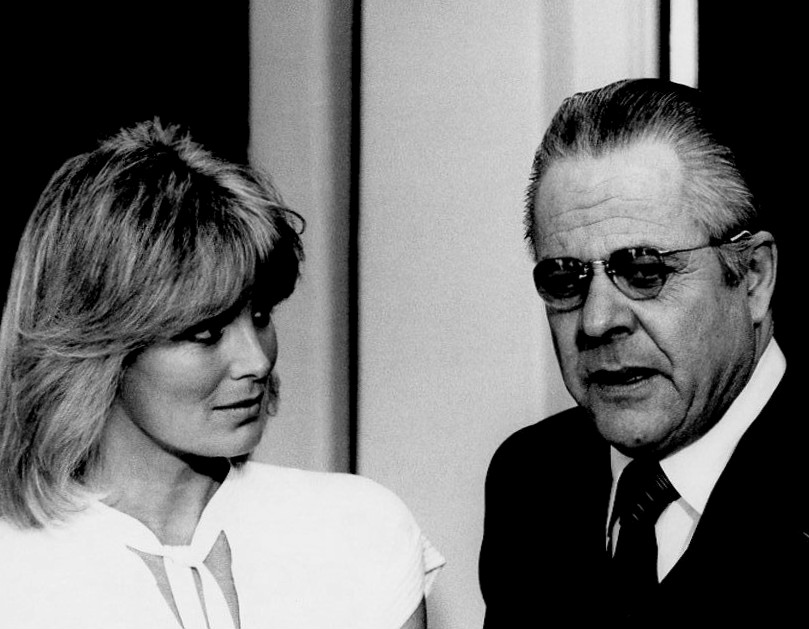
Linda Evans and guest star William Windom in the episode "Lysenko Syndrome."

James Hunter worked for an unnamed United States government intelligence agency – referred to merely as "the Agency" – until 1969, when he resigned because he disapproved of the Agency's methods. He retired from the espionage business to run a rare books store in Santa Barbara, California. In 1977, General Baker is ordered to recruit six counterespionage agents to form a new covert agency – also unnamed – charged with protecting the United States from a variety of threats whether they arise domestically or abroad. Baker's first choice for the new agency is Hunter. In Baker's new agency, Hunter either works alone or is assigned someone to assist him, all the while continuing to pose as a rare books dealer.

In all but two episodes, Baker assigns another of his agents, Marty Shaw, to assist Hunter. Marty lives in a different part of the United States and is also undercover – as a famous model. She also has her own assignments separate from Hunter's. Marty is Hunter's lover, and the two share a bed when traveling together on their assignments.

As undercover counterespionage agents, they battle in locales across the United States with a wide variety of international foes, ranging from communists to organized crime to rogue American agents.

The two "K Group" episodes differ from the rest in being flashbacks to the time when Hunter was still with "the Agency" as its chief of operations in West Berlin.

== Production ==
CBS picked up Hunter in 1976 as a hedge against one of its new shows failing during the 1976–77 season. In the pilot for the show, produced in 1976, James Franciscus was the show's only regular and his James Hunter character was a man framed for crimes he did not commit. Released after eight years in prison, he sets out to clear his name by bringing Ingersoll, the man who framed him, to justice. Along the way he meets and falls for a prostitute, Marty Shaw, portrayed by guest star Linda Evans. Ingersoll evades capture, and the show's producers envisioned that in future episodes Hunter would continue his pursuit of Ingersoll.

The pilot never aired, and its entire premise was scrapped. For the weekly series, James Hunter instead became the retired agent who resumes a counterespionage career. Franciscus and Evans had had a good on-screen chemistry in the pilot, so Marty became a regular character as a fellow agent and model instead of a prostitute. The General Baker character also was introduced as their spymaster. Thirteen episodes were produced with this new premise.

William Blinn created Hunter and wrote its pilot, and David Gerber (at the time president of competing studio Columbia Pictures Television) was the show's executive producer for Lorimar Productions. Lee Rich and Philip Capice produced the pilot and the weekly series. Tom Gries produced and directed the pilot and Christopher Morgan produced the weekly series.

== Broadcast history ==
After the cancellation of the series Executive Suite and its last broadcast on February 11, 1977, CBS needed a replacement to fill the void in its schedule. It had bought Hunter for just such a contingency. Hunter premiered a week later, on February 18, 1977, and aired on Fridays at 10:00 p.m. through April 22, 1977. After a five-week hiatus, its last original episode was broadcast on Friday, May 27, 1977, also at 10:00 p.m. The final 4 episodes never aired.

== Episodes ==
=== Pilot ===
Title	Original release date
"Hunter"	Unaired
After spending eight years in prison for crimes (fraud and bribery) he did not commit, James Hunter is released and sets out to clear his name by finding the man who framed him—his former boss, Mr. Ingersoll. He tracks Ingersoll down at the 25th reunion of Ingersoll’s former military unit. Hunter escapes death when a tank attacks him in the hotel's underground parking lot and again when a room service cart explodes. He also falls in love with a prostitute named Marty Shaw. Ultimately, a killer gets sent to jail, but Ingersoll—who is seen throughout the episode only from behind as he gives orders to his henchmen—escapes. Ned Beatty and Linda Evans guest-star. The pilot's premise of Hunter as a wrongly convicted former prisoner seeking justice was not used in the weekly series. Produced in 1976.

=== Season 1 (1977) ===
No.	Title	Original release date
1	"Bluebird Is Back"	February 18, 1977
Hunter’s archenemy, a Soviet agent and killer known as Bluebird, is suspected of killing an American who betrayed the Soviets after leaking American nuclear secrets to them. Bluebird murders a succession of informants before Hunter can contact them, usually leaving a razor-sharp throwing star in each victim's body but on one occasion sabotaging a victim's parachute. The murders lead Hunter and Marty to a Soviet plot to discredit an American nuclear-powered electric plant design. Edward Mulhare guest-stars. This was the first episode of the weekly series, which used the new premise of Hunter and Marty being counterespionage agents.
2	"Mirror Image"	February 25, 1977
A Soviet double of Hunter—created through the use of plastic surgery—arrives to carry out a plot to kill General Baker and frame Hunter for the murder. But first he has to fool Marty into believing that he is the real Hunter. Diana Muldaur guest-stars.
3	"Lysenko Syndrome"	March 4, 1977
A mad scientist programs an American agent to kill Hunter. He then arranges for Marty to have a car accident so that he can treat her for her injuries and uses the opportunity to program her to kill her uncle, an influential admiral in the United States Navy, when she gets the news that Hunter is dead. Hunter uses a mirror to snap her out of her programming. William Windom guest-stars.
4	"The Hit"	March 11, 1977
After a hitman dies during a car chase, Hunter switches wallets with him, takes his place, and sets out to find out who hired the hitman and who the hitman's target was—and soon begins to realize that he was himself the target of the hit. Nehemiah Persoff guest-stars.
5	"The Costa Rican Connection"	March 18, 1977
After a witness for a United States Senate committee investigating a connection between organized crime and a U.S. government intelligence agency (the fictional "GIA") is murdered, Hunter and Marty face the challenge of convincing the last surviving witness that they can protect him if he testifies—and a retired song-and-dance man becomes a key figure in their search for the assassin. Donald O'Connor guest-stars.
6	"The K Group: Part 1"	April 8, 1977
In a flashback to before Hunter′s 1969 resignation from "the Agency" when he was still their chief of operations in West Berlin, Hunter becomes a wary ally of an East German spy who shot his fiancé to death nine years earlier. After the East German is killed at a film festival in Los Angeles, Hunter and the agency try to figure out who killed him. Vic Morrow guest-stars.
7	"The K Group: Part 2"	April 15, 1977
Another flashback to the time when Hunter was still with "the Agency" as its chief of operations in West Berlin before he resigned in 1969. When Hunter, Marty, and Baker try to stop renegade American agents from assassinating a United States Government official, Hunter's adversary, seeking political asylum in the United States, offers to betray the group that hired him to assassinate the dignitary.
8	"The Barking Dog"	April 22, 1977
Dr. Martin Reed, a chemist working for the U.S. government, disappears mysteriously. At the same time, Dr. William Maklin, one of his associates, is killed in a plane crash. Investigating Maklin's death, Hunter discovers that Reed is in hiding and plotting to poison the Southern California water supply and kill two million people if he does not receive a payment of $10,000,000 within 48 hours. Robert Mandan guest-stars.
9	"Yesterday, Upon the Stair"	May 27, 1977
When Hunter helps with the exchange of a U.S.-held Communist spy for a Communist-held American spy—who happens also to be his favorite instructor in spycraft—persons unknown intervene in the exchange and kidnap both of the spies being exchanged. Hunter and Marty are assigned to find the missing American spy, and Hunter begins to suspect that a traitor in his own agency is responsible for the kidnapping. David Wayne guest-stars.
10	"The Back-Up"	Unaired
An American agent disappears after his attempt to escort a Chinese defector to a safe house fails and the defector, who was about to reveal crucial intelligence, is kidnapped. Hunter is sent to find both the missing agent and the defector. Leif Erickson and Keye Luke guest-star.
11	"The Chand Is Burning"	Unaired
After an American agent—a friend of Hunter's named Bill Wells—with information about the (fictional) African Republic of Chand is killed in Los Angeles while conducting an investigation, Hunter decides to continue the investigation that Wells started. It leads Hunter and Marty to Steven Brandt, a prominent civil servant at the United States Department of State who is involved in a huge political scandal. Hunter and Marty save Chand, uncover political corruption, and find Wells' killer.
12	"The Lovejoy Files"	Unaired
A file that only the President of the United States was supposed to see is stolen. The group that has it agrees to ransom it, but when Hunter and a man from the U.S Government archives office arrive to pick it up, a third group steals it from them. Hunter finds that he is up against a man who will stop at nothing to obtain the file. Sorrell Booke guest-stars.
13	"UFM 13"	Unaired
Hunter goes undercover to investigate a theft of plutonium from an American nuclear plant and finds that he must stop an American radical conservative group from using the plutonium to make an atomic bomb. Cameron Mitchell guest-stars.
