= Nashville 99 =

- Created by: Ernie Frankel
- Directed by: Lawrence Dobkin; Don McDougall; George Sherman
- Starring: Claude Akins; Jerry Reed
- Opening theme: "Nashville 99" performed by Jerry Reed
- Composer: Earle Hagen
- Country of origin: United States
- Original language: English
- No. of seasons: 1
- No. of episodes: 4

Production
- Producer: Ernie Frankel
- Running time: 60 minutes
- Production companies: Frankel Productions; 20th Century Fox Television

Original release
- Network: CBS
- Release: April 1 – April 22, 1977

Nashville 99 is an American crime drama series that aired for 4 episodes on CBS from April 1 to April 22, 1977. The series starred Claude Akins as Det. Lt. Stonewall Huff (badge number 99) and Jerry Reed as Det. Trace Mayne. Supporting cast members included Lucille Benson as Birdie Huff, Charley Pride as R.B., and Dianne Sherrill as Rollie.

== Overview ==
"Stoney" Huff – a farmer running a 200-acre spread outside Nashville – is portrayed as a tough, old school cop who plays fair, regardless of the stature of the criminal, and fights crime his own way. Mayne, however, is seen as a redneck officer who, in an attempt at country music stardom, pitches his songs to the myriad celebrity entertainers he encounters.

Guest stars included Chet Atkins, Ned Beatty, Pat Hingle, Don Johnson, Johnny Paycheck, Jeannine Riley, Ray Stevens, Mel Tillis, Sharon Wyatt (in her first TV appearance), and Tammy Wynette.

Episodes of Nashville 99 were directed by Lawrence Dobkin, Don McDougall, and George Sherman, and written by Ron Bishop and Jimmy Sangster. The series was produced by Frankel Productions in association with 20th Century Fox Television (with Ernie Frankel serving as Executive Producer), and featured a theme song performed and co-written by Reed. One month later, Reed co-starred with Burt Reynolds in Smokey and the Bandit.

In 1980, Reed would go on to star in another short-lived, Ernie Frankel-created series for CBS, Concrete Cowboys, that was also written by Jimmy Sangster and directed by Lawrence Dobkin. It only lasted seven episodes.

== Cast ==
- Claude Akins as Det. Lt. Stonewall Huff
- Jerry Reed as Det. Trace Mayne
- Lucille Benson as Birdie Huff
- Charley Pride as R.B.

== Episode list ==
Ep #	Title	Directed by	Written by	Airdate
1	"Sing Me a Song to Die By"	Don McDougall	Jimmy Sangster	April 1, 1977
2	"Joldy"	Lawrence Dobkin	Ron Bishop	April 8, 1977
3	"The Fallen Idol"	George Sherman	Jimmy Sangster	April 15, 1977
4	"Jolene"	Andrew V. McLaglen	Ernie Frankel	April 22, 1977

== Availability and syndication ==
All episodes have not been seen since their initial run. Episode prints of the show do belong in some private collections. YouTube has two of the episodes available.
