= Shields and Yarnell =

Mime and comedy duo

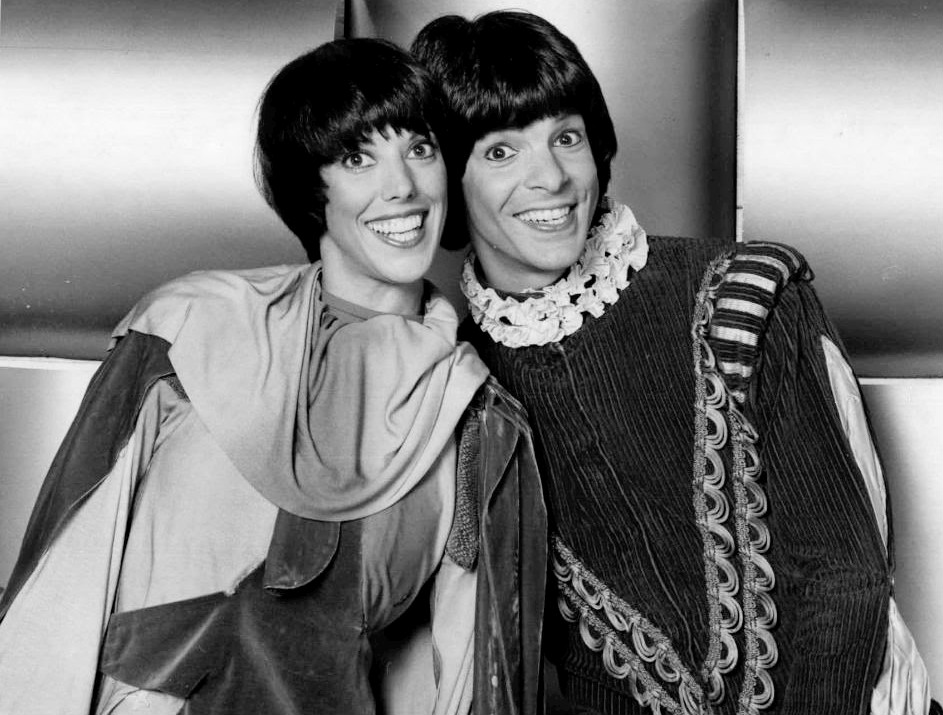
Yarnell (left) and Shields (right) in 1977.

Shields and Yarnell were an American mime team, formed in 1972, consisting of married couple Robert Shields (born March 26, 1951) and Lorene Yarnell (March 21, 1944 – July 29, 2010).

== Robert Shields ==
Robert Shields
- Born: March 26, 1951 (age 74); Los Angeles, California, U.S.
- Occupations: Actor, mime artist
- Spouses: Lorene Yarnell (m. 1972; div. 1986) Laurie Burke (m. 2006; died 2007) Jennifer Griffiths (m. 2009; div. 2014)

Shields was born in Los Angeles and graduated from Ulyses S Grant High School. At the age of 18, while working as a street mime and performing at the Hollywood Wax Museum, he was discovered by Marcel Marceau, who offered him a full scholarship to his school of mime in Paris. His apprenticeship was short-lived, however, as he felt the need to develop his own style. Shields soon returned to California, working in Union Square, San Francisco. Shields is credited with being the originator of the hip-hop dance form known as "The Robot", with his street performances and talk show appearances bringing his moves to a wider audience and inspiring young dancers to set it to music. The style was further popularized by Michael Jackson whom Shields claims learned it directly from him in person. In 1974, Shields appeared in Francis Ford Coppola's film The Conversation. In 1998, Shields was recruited by the Ringling Bros. and Barnum & Bailey Circus to serve as their Director of Clowning.

In 2024 a documentary Robert Shields: My Life As A Robot chronicling his career and influence as a mime and entertainer was released. Currently he makes his living as an artist specializing in painting, collages and metal sculpture in a southwestern style in Verde Valley Arizona.

Lorene Yarnell and Robert Shields met when they worked on Fol-de-Rol, a 1972 Sid and Marty Krofft TV special that was Shields' first TV appearance.

== Lorene Yarnell ==
Lorene Yarnell
- Born: Lorene Louise Yarnell; March 21, 1944; Inglewood, California, U.S.
- Died: July 29, 2010 (aged 66); Sandefjord, Norway
- Resting place: Sandar Church Cemetery in Sandefjord, Norway
- Occupations: Actress, mime artist
- Notable work: Dot Matrix in Spaceballs (1987)
- Spouses: John R. Hartman (m. 1966; div. 1967) Robert Shields (m. 1972; div. 1986) Bjørn Jansson (m. 1996)
- Relatives: Bruce Yarnell (brother)

Lorene Yarnell, also a native of Los Angeles, had been a dancer and actress in movies and television shows, including Bye Bye Birdie, Shindig!, and The Carol Burnett Show, as well as off-Broadway musicals, before she met Shields, in San Francisco.

She later had speaking guest appearances on The Muppet Show and Wonder Woman, which both also featured Shields.

Yarnell later appeared as Claudine in a 1983 outdoor production of Can-Can at The Muny in St. Louis, starring Broadway's Judy Kaye, John Reardon, John Schuck, Beth Leavel and Lawrence Leritz, her dance partner, to excellent reviews. On film, Yarnell played Dot Matrix (body acting, with Joan Rivers performing the voice) in the 1987 Mel Brooks movie Spaceballs.

== As a duo ==
Shields and Yarnell's specialty was a series of skits called The Clinkers, in which they assumed the personae of robots, with many individual, deliberate motions (as opposed to normal smooth motion) stereotypical of robots and early animatronics, enhanced by their ability to refrain from blinking their eyes for long stretches of time.

Their dance and mime performances were featured in 1977 and 1978 on their own CBS television comedy-variety program, The Shields and Yarnell Show. They appeared on 400 national television shows in the United States, including The Sonny & Cher Comedy Hour, The Red Skelton Show, The Muppet Show (1979), and The Tonight Show Starring Johnny Carson. The pair played the "Six-Hundred-Dollar People" created by Dr. Loveless Jr., in the 1979 TV movie The Wild Wild West Revisited. They performed in the unsuccessful Broadway musical production Broadway Follies in New York City, which closed after only one performance, following bad reviews that night. Career highlights included shows for two American Presidents, a command performance for Queen Elizabeth II, and a tour of China with comedian Bob Hope.

Their television special Toys on the Town, written by Shields, earned an Emmy Award.

They won an award as Las Vegas "Entertainer of the Year," dual Georgies for "Rising Stars of the Year" and "Special Attraction of the Year" from the American Guild of Variety Artists.

== Post-divorce ==
Shields and Yarnell married in 1972 and divorced in 1986. Shields opened a jewelry and art business in Sedona, Arizona, while Yarnell remarried and moved to Norway. They remained on friendly terms after the divorce and reunited periodically to tour with their act.

While in Sedona, Shields met singer-songwriter Laurie Burke in 2002, and the two married on September 25, 2006. Burke was diagnosed with a brain tumor the next spring and died April 25, 2007. Shields was married to Jennifer Griffiths from 2009 to 2014. Shields currently resides in Verde Valley, Arizona, engaged in painting, sculpture, and jewelry design.

== Death of Lorene Yarnell ==
Yarnell moved to Sandefjord, Norway, in 1998 with her third husband Bjørn Jansson. She died of a ruptured intracranial aneurysm on July 29, 2010, at the age of 66.
