= The Richard Pryor Show =

American television series

- Created by: Richard Pryor
- Starring: Richard Pryor
- Country of origin: United States
- No. of seasons: 1
- No. of episodes: 4

Production
- Running time: 45–48 minutes

Original release
- Network: NBC
- Release: September 13 – October 4, 1977

The Richard Pryor Show is an American comedy variety show starring and created by Richard Pryor. It premiered on NBC on Tuesday, September 13, 1977, at 8 p.m. opposite ABC's Laverne & Shirley and Happy Days.

The show was produced by Rocco Urbisci for Burt Sugarman Productions. It was conceived out of a special that Pryor did for NBC in May 1977. Because the special was a major hit, both critically and commercially, Pryor was given a chance to host and star in his own television show.

TV Guide included the series in their 2013 list of 60 shows that were "Cancelled Too Soon".

== Production history ==
The Richard Pryor Show lasted four episodes during the 1977 season. It ranked 86th out of 104 shows for the 1977–78 season, with an average 14.5 rating.

Industry observers questioned NBC's decision to put one of America's most controversial and profanity-laced artists in the middle of "family hour" on Tuesdays; the show was one of the earliest and most blatant challenges to the hour, which had been ruled unenforceable nine months prior.

== Cast ==
- Richard Pryor
- Robin Williams
- Paul Mooney
- Tim Reid
- John Witherspoon
- Sandra Bernhard
- Vic Dunlop
- Edie McClurg
- Marsha Warfield
- Allegra Allison

The main cast consisted of Pryor as various characters. Some of the more popular characters were Pryor playing a money-seeking priest, a wino, and a white-hating rock star. The rest of the cast consisted of comedians, some of whom went on to have popular careers in Hollywood.

== Episodes and controversy ==
Pryor taped only four episodes of the show. There were many controversial skits that aired, but the most controversial bit was the first episode's unaired title-card scene in which Pryor was shown nude but with his genitals removed like a Ken doll, with Pryor insisting "I have given up absolutely nothing" from his material to ensure the program was televised (the gag being that Pryor was indeed, euphemistically, neutered). A skit in which Pryor appeared as a machine gun-toting rocker who kills all of his fans also caused a stir. The third episode also featured a controversial skit that showed a woman describing what her first lesbian experience was like in a park. Probably one of the most shocking and revealing skits of the show came during the last episode. The skit featured a roast (similar to ones by the Friars Club or hosted by Dean Martin). The show's cast roasted Pryor, who sat with his head down laughing while regulars on the show either had kind remarks or very scornful ones. For instance, Sandra Bernhard said that Pryor was a very good father who gave everything he had, that being "a flat nose and big lips."

== Home media and syndication ==
A two-volume DVD set was released on March 23, 2004. The DVDs include the special that Pryor did that was the inspiration for the series.

In February 2010, the African-American-themed cable network TV One aired a five-hour marathon of The Richard Pryor Show, which consisted of the original special, followed by all four episodes of the series. The broadcast marked one of only two times that the show had been aired on television since its original run on NBC. In the late 1990s, it was re-shown as a summer filler show after most of their other series had either been canceled or fulfilled their regular seasons. In February 2011, TV One re-aired the episodes again in honor of black history month. The network began showing the episodes again, in August 2012.

On March 11, 2010, The Top 10 Greatest Sketches from The Richard Pryor Show was released by Alright, Dude Productions, featuring a mini-documentary format on Pryor's history, the conception of the show, and eventually moving into the actual countdown portion.

The show can also be seen as part of Time Life's The Ultimate Richard Pryor Collection Uncensored DVD box set.
