= The Andros Targets =

- Title card for The Andros Targets
- Genre: Crime drama
- Created by: Jerome Coopersmith
- Starring: James Sutorius; Pamela Reed; Roy Poole; Alan Mixon; Ted Beniades; Jordan Charney
- Country of origin: United States
- Original language: English
- No. of seasons: 1
- No. of episodes: 13

Production
- Executive producers: Bob Sweeney and Larry Rosen
- Running time: 60 minutes

Original release
- Network: CBS
- Release: January 31 – May 16, 1977

The Andros Targets is a 1977 American crime drama television series starring James Sutorius which centers around a crusading newspaper reporter who uncovers corruption in New York City. The show aired on CBS from January 31 to May 16, 1977.

== Cast ==
- James Sutorius as Mike Andros
- Pamela Reed as Sandi Farrell
- Roy Poole as Chet Reynolds
- Alan Mixon as Norman Kale
- Ted Beniades as Wayne Hillman
- Jordan Charney as Ted Bergman

== Synopsis ==
Mike Andros is an investigative reporter for a major metropolitan newspaper in New York City, the fictional New York Forum. He focuses his work on uncovering corruption. Sandi Farrell is his young assistant. Chet Reynolds is the New York Forum's managing editor, Norman Kale is its city editor, and Ted Bergman is its metropolitan editor. Wayne Hillman is another reporter on the Forum's staff and Andros's friend.

== Production ==
Created by Jerome Coopersmith, The Andros Targets was based on the experiences of investigative journalist Nicholas Gage, who is listed in the show's opening credits as its "journalistic consultant." Bob Sweeney and Larry Rosen were its executive producers. Coopersmith wrote all 13 episodes, and his co-writers on one or more episodes were George Bellak, Frank Cucci, Tim Maschler, and Irving Gaynor Neiman.

Sweeney directed one episode. Other episode directors were Marc Daniels, Harry Falk, Edward H. Feldman, Irving J. Moore, Seymour Robbie, and Don Weis.

== Broadcast history ==
The Andros Targets aired on Mondays at 10:00 p.m., premiering on January 31, 1977. Its last original episode aired on May 16, 1977. Reruns of the show returned to prime time in July 1977, the last of them airing on July 9.

== Episodes ==
No.	Title	Original release date
1	"The Killing of a Porno Queen"	January 31, 1977
A young actress apparently commits suicide, but Andros suspects that her death is tied to a maker of pornographic films. Dixie Carter guest-stars.
2	"A Currency for Murder"	February 7, 1977
Andros finds that diamonds belonging to the victim of a plane crash are tied to a rising diplomat in Washington, D.C., and organized crime in New York City.
3	"In the Event of My Death"	February 14, 1977
A car explosion kills a fellow reporter, and Andros discovers that a different reporter was the intended target and is still in danger. Frances Sternhagen guest-stars.
4	"The Treatment Succeeded But the Patient Died"	February 21, 1977
Looking into the death of a formerly well-known author, Andros suspects that a prominent Park Avenue doctor is administering illegal amphetamines. This episode is most likely based on the real-life case of Dr. Robert Freymann, who dispensed vitamin B12 shots laced with amphetamines to wealthy clients in New York during the 1960s.
5	"A Labor Czar Is Missing"	February 28, 1977
A labor union leader is missing, and Andros suspects that he has been murdered.
6	"Requiem for a Stolen Child: Part 1"	March 7, 1977
Investigating the disappearance of a girl, Andros exposes a religious cult that he believes is brainwashing its followers, and he tries to rescue the girl from it.
7	"Requiem for a Stolen Child: Part 2"	March 14, 1977
As Andros continues his investigation of the cult that brainwashed the girl, he discovers that the cult's leader, Reverend Ellis, is blackmailing government officials to place his followers in positions of power.
8	"The Beast of Athens"	April 4, 1977
Investigating the past of a respected New York City businessman, Andros discovers that he is a Greek war criminal.
9	"Death in a Toy Balloon"	April 18, 1977
Investigating the deaths of a number of college students, Andros discovers that they were drug couriers.
10	"The Deadly Silence"	April 25, 1977
A young girl from Northern Ireland witnesses the murder of a toy manufacturer, but she is too afraid of the police to come forward.
11	"Killer of the Year"	May 2, 1977
Andros investigates the possibility that a football star who is about to be named player of the year is guilty of rape and murder.
12	"The Surrender"	May 9, 1977
A wanted fugitive who was formerly a radical leader wants Andros to arrange his surrender to the Federal Bureau of Investigation. Michael Cristofer guest-stars.
13	"The Smut Peddler"	May 16, 1977
The offices of a celebrity scandal magazine are fire-bombed repeatedly, and Andros has several suspects in mind.
