= Quinn Martin's Tales of the Unexpected =

- Title card with text "Tales of the Unexpected". A card with the text "Quinn Martin's" immediately preceded it during the opening credits.
- Genre: Horror/Science fiction
- Written by: Richard W. Fielder; Nina Laemmle; Carol Saraceno; James Schermer; Arnold Somkin; Ken Trevey; Earl W. Wallace; John Wilder; Robert Malcolm Young
- Directed by: Harry Falk; Walter Grauman; Curtis Harrington; Richard Lang; Allen Reisner
- Starring: William Conrad (host and narrator)
- Theme music composer: David Shire
- Composers: Richard Markowitz; Duane Tatro
- Country of origin: United States
- Original language: English
- No. of seasons: 1
- No. of episodes: 8

Production
- Executive producer: Quinn Martin
- Producers: John Wilder; William Robert Yates
- Running time: 60 minutes
- Production company: Quinn Martin Productions

Original release
- Network: NBC
- Release: February 2 – August 24, 1977

Quinn Martin's Tales of the Unexpected is an American horror and science fiction anthology television series produced by Quinn Martin, and hosted and narrated by William Conrad. It aired from February 2 to August 24, 1977.

Quinn Martin's Tales of the Unexpected aired in the United Kingdom as Twist in the Tale.

== Cast ==
William Conrad hosted and narrated Quinn Martin's Tales of the Unexpected. Unlike the majority of series by Quinn Martin Productions, Quinn Martin's Tales of the Unexpected did not have an announcer speaking during the opening credits.

== Synopsis ==
The stories told in Quinn Martin's Tales of the Unexpected are of the horror and science fiction genres. Each episode consists of a single macabre story of the psychological or the occult that explores the vicissitudes of human nature. As its title suggests, each story has an unexpected "twist" or "sting" to maintain the suspense until the very end of the episode and demonstrate to the viewer that one's life is full of twists and turns that cannot be anticipated, and can be horrible.

Each episode begins with everyday images from various episodes of the show, suggesting that the unexpected can be found anywhere, including in the most familiar and common of places. After the opening credits and episode title, Conrad in a voice-over discusses a general topic and then relates it to the central character in the episode. The story involving the character then unfolds, with the character facing a horrific situation that ends with an unexpected twist. At the conclusion of the episode, Conrad returns with another voice-over in which he explains the episode's "sting" or twist, and then applies the story to the general subject first broached after the opening credits.

== Production ==
Eight episodes were produced, one of them two hours long and the rest of them one hour long.

== Criticism ==
In his 1981 non-fiction study of the horror genre, Danse Macabre, the horror fiction novelist Stephen King mentioned Quinn Martin's Tales of the Unexpected, writing that it was "interesting" and citing an episode in which a murderer sees his victims return to life on his television set as particularly frightening.

The program drew negative responses from critics. American television standards of the 1970s required limitations on the amount of violence that could be depicted, with too much emotional intensity defined as a form of excessive and unnecessary violence. The show thus had to limit its emotional intensity while filling an hour-long format, leading to what critics described as sluggishly paced stories that lacked many frightening or eerie moments.

The show also was criticized by American literary critic John Kenneth Muir for its lack of originality. Muir wrote that the show tended to reuse already-familiar horror story ideas, some of them considered old as long as several decades earlier. Two episodes, Muir said, were unacknowledged remakes; "The Force of Evil" copied the plot of the 1962 film Cape Fear almost exactly, while "The Nomads" reworked the plot of "Beachhead", the pilot for the 1967-1968 television series The Invaders. The episode "A Hand For Sonny Blue" drew harsh reviews not only for recycling a plot that had been used frequently before – a transplanted limb having an evil character of its own – but also for ending with the "twist" that the entire episode had been merely a dream.

== Broadcast history ==
Tales of the Unexpected premiered on February 2, 1977, and aired on NBC on Wednesdays at 10:00 p.m. until March 9, competing in its time slot with ABC's Charlie's Angels and Baretta. Due to low ratings, the show went into hiatus for five months and returned on August 17, airing two more episodes in its original Wednesday time slot before its cancellation.

On November 29, 1978, NBC aired a two-hour movie entitled Someone's Watching Me!, produced by John Carpenter and starring Lauren Hutton, David Birney, and Adrienne Barbeau. Although NBC promoted it as a "Tales of the Unexpected special," the movie was instead produced by Warner Bros. and was unrelated to the series, which at the time had been off the air for over a year.

== Episodes ==
No.	Title	Directed by	Written by	Original release date
1	"The Final Chapter"	Richard Lang	John Wilder; Based on a short story by: Richard O. Lewis	February 2, 1977
To be able to write accurately about the psychological effects of capital punishment, a crusading but stubborn newspaper journalist named Frank Harris has himself placed on death row, where he masquerades as a convict under an assumed identity. Suddenly his outside contacts disappear, and his real identity and innocence of any capital crime are forgotten. Unable to convince prison officials of his actual identity, he is scheduled to be executed. He is strapped into the electric chair while one of his jailers, an old enemy who knows his real identity, merely watches and smiles. Starring Roy Thinnes, Tim O'Connor, Ramon Bieri, Ned Beatty, & Brendan Dillon.
2	"The Mask of Adonis"	Richard Lang	Ken Trevey	February 9, 1977
A 52-year-old movie producer named Alexander Rush who is obsessed with youth and good looks discovers that a coldhearted and sinister doctor named Viviana Kadar, who works at an isolated clinic, has discovered a mysterious rejuvenation process that can allow him to achieve and maintain the appearance of a man in his 30s. When Rush sees another of Dr. Kadar's patients age rapidly, however, he realizes that the price of eternal rejuvenation may be more than he's willing to pay. Starring Robert Foxworth, Marlyn Mason, & Linda Kelsey.
3	"Devil Pack"	Harry Falk	Arnold Somkin & John Wilder; Based on a story by: Nina Laemmle	February 16, 1977
A pack of vicious wild dogs under the influence of a satanic leader terrorizes an isolated foothill community. After the dogs kill several people, farmer Jerry Colby begins to fight back. When his own dogs turn against him, Colby discovers that the howls of the wild dogs prompt domesticated dogs to attack their human companions. Starring Ronny Cox, Van Williams, Christine Belford, & Russell Thorson.
4	"The Nomads"	Allen Reisner	Earl Wallace; Story by : Anthony Wilson (uncredited)	February 23, 1977
A Vietnam War veteran with a history of hallucinations witnesses the nighttime landing of an unidentified flying object and discovers a colony of aliens who are planning to conquer the Earth. His psychological history makes it hard for him to get anyone to believe that he "saw a flying saucer", and he finds that those closest to him are not who they seemed to be. The episode is a reworking of "Beachhead", the 1967 pilot for the 1967–1968 television series The Invaders. Starring David Birney, Eugene Roche, David Huddleston, & Katherine Justice.
5	"A Hand for Sonny Blue"	Curtis Harrington	John Wilder; Based on the short story "The Hand That Wouldn't Behave" by: Emile C. Schurmacher	March 9, 1977
Just after signing a million-dollar contract, Los Angeles Dodgers pitcher Sonny Blue has his right hand mangled in a car accident. Doctors try to save his career by transplanting the hand of deceased murderer who robbed a liquor store onto his arm. After the operation, the hand heals quickly, but Blue discovers to his horror that it has a criminal will of its own. Eventually, however, Blue awakens to discover that the entire episode had been merely a dream. The episode was originally titled "A Hand for Sonny Gray". Starring Rick Nelson, Janice Lynde, Carl Weathers, Alfred Ryder, & Paul Cavonis.
6	"The Force of Evil"	Richard Lang	Robert Malcolm Young	March 13, 1977
A rapist and murderer named Teddy Jakes–the crematorium operator at a hospital prior to his conviction—is paroled after seven years in jail and returns to a small community to take revenge against a physician at the hospital named Dr. Carrington, whose testimony sent Jakes to prison rather than providing him with an alibi. Jakes kills the family's pet horse and begins a campaign of terror against Carrington and his family. Unable to get help from the authorities, Carrington and his wife take the defense of their family into their own hands and think they have killed Jakes. Jakes reappears, however, to befriend the physician's daughter Cindy, and he escalates his activities against the Carrington family. The Carringtons begin to believe that Jakes might be some type of undead, unkillable specter, although eventually a fight between Jakes and Carrington aboard a houseboat results in Jakes falling overboard and drowning. Originally conceived as a two-part episode, it instead aired on one evening as a single two-hour episode; it was the series' only two-hour episode and the only one to air on a Sunday. The episode was essentially a remake of the 1962 movie Cape Fear with an additional supernatural aspect. Starring Lloyd Bridges, William Watson, Patricia Crowley, Kirby Cullen, John Anderson, & Eve Plumb.
7	"You're Not Alone"	Allen Reisner	Carol Saraceno	August 17, 1977
A beautiful businesswoman moves into a high-rise apartment and begins to receive messages and gifts from a secret admirer. She soon finds her privacy invaded and her lifestyle shattered when the secret admirer turns out to be a voyeur with sophisticated equipment. His gifts and anonymous telephone calls to her drive her to the brink of madness until she turns the tables on him–with horrifying results. Starring Joanna Pettet, Herbert Edelman, Jenny O'Hara, Patricia Smith, Gary Collins, & Patricia Mattick.
8	"No Way Out"	Walter Grauman	Story by : James Schmerer; Teleplay by : Richard W. Fielder	August 24, 1977
United States Navy officer John Kelty is too busy with his career and his hobby–recreational boating–to pay attention to his wife and young son. On June 3, 1952, he unwittingly pilots his boat through a time warp during a severe storm in the Bermuda Triangle and finds himself transported 25 years into the future to 1977. He discovers that his wife is happily remarried–to a man who obviously cherishes her–and that his son has become a successful cardiologist who is making the same mistake he did by ignoring his own family, a mistake Kelty now believes ruined his own life. Not letting his son know his real identity, Kelty befriends him and urges him to spend more time with his own wife and children. Eventually, the elder Kelty goes back to sea to try to return to 1952 and correct his mistake by paying more attention to his wife and son, but his body is found washed ashore in 1977 after he drowns in the attempt—symbolizing that it is impossible to make up for past mistakes and that one must take advantage of the present. Starring Bill Bixby, Dean Stockwell, Robert Pine, Hal England, Robert J. Hogan, Davey Davison, & Sheila Larken.

=== Proposed additional episodes ===
Five additional episodes entitled "Something's Out There," "Remember Tomorrow," "A Place of Guilt," "Graves for the Living," and "A Safe Return" were proposed but never produced.

=== Home video release ===
The series' sixth episode, "The Force of Evil" was released on VHS from Good-Times Home video in 1987, making it the only episode made available on the secondary or home media market.
