= The Practice (1976 TV series) =

1976 American sitcom

- Title card, Danny Thomas as Dr. Jules Bedford
- Genre: Situation comedy
- Created by: Steve Gordon
- Starring: Danny Thomas; Dena Dietrich; Shelley Fabares; David Spielberg; Didi Conn; Allen Price; Damon Raskin; John Byner; Sam Laws; Mike Evans
- Composer: David Shire
- Country of origin: United States
- Original language: English
- No. of seasons: 2
- No. of episodes: 27 (4 unaired)

Production
- Executive producer: Danny Thomas
- Producer: Paul Junger Witt
- Running time: 30 minutes
- Production company: Danny Thomas Productions

Original release
- Network: NBC
- Release: January 30, 1976 – January 26, 1977

The Practice is an American sitcom starring Danny Thomas that centers on a father and son who are both physicians in New York City. The show aired from January 30, 1976, to January 26, 1977.

== Synopsis ==
Jules Bedford is a crusty, sometimes grumpy, and somewhat absent-minded old-school physician with a genuine concern for people; he is idealistic about the practice of medicine, caring for people even when there is no money to be made. His office is in a middle-class area on Manhattan's West Side, where Molly Gibbons is the nurse who has been with him for years and has a crush on him. Helen is his young and slightly crazy receptionist and office manager.

Jules's son David is also a physician, but is less idealistic: His practice is on exclusive Park Avenue and he is more interested in making money than his father. David is always trying to get Jules to move his practice in with David's and share office space. Jenny is David's wife, and they are the parents of two young boys, Paul and Tony.

Dr. Roland Caine is Jules' associate during the first season in the spring of 1976; a medical intern named Lenny is with him during the second season in the autumn of 1976.

== Cast ==
- Danny Thomas as Dr. Jules Bedford
- Dena Dietrich as Molly Gibbons
- Shelley Fabares as Jenny Bedford
- David Spielberg as Dr. David Bedford
- Didi Conn as Helen
- Allen Price as Paul Bedford
- Damon Raskin as Tony Bedford
- John Byner as Dr. Roland Caine (Season 1)
- Mike Evans as Lenny (Season 2)
- Sam Laws as Nate

== Production ==
Steve Gordon created The Practice and Danny Thomas was its executive producer. Gordon wrote some of the episodes, and other episode writers included Jack Ainob, John Boni, Sam Denoff, Bernie Kahn, Bruce Kane, Dale McRaven, Rick Mittleman, Jim Rogers, Bruce Selitz, Arnold Somkin, Norman Stiles, and Mark Tuttle.

Episode directors included Richard Kinon, Tony Mordente, Bill Persky, and Noam Pitlik.

During the first season, classical music played during The Practice's opening credits. While the visuals for the opening credits remained unchanged for the second season, the music changed to a new ragtime theme.

== Broadcast history ==
During its first season, The Practice aired on NBC on Fridays at 8:30 p.m., from January 30 to May 14, 1976. It returned for a second season, airing from October 13 through November 1976 on Wednesdays at 8:00 p.m. and shifting to Wednesdays at 9:30 p.m. from December 1976 through the end of its run. Its last original episode aired on January 26, 1977. Four additional episodes were never broadcast.

== Episodes ==
=== Series overview ===
Season	Episodes	Originally released	
Season	Episodes	First released	Last released
1	14	January 30, 1976	May 14, 1976
2	13 (4 unaired)	October 13, 1976	January 26, 1977

=== Season 1 (1976) ===
No. overall	No. in series	Title	Directed by	Written by	Original release date
1	1	"The Practice"	Lee Philips	Steve Gordon	January 30, 1976
The pilot for the series. David diagnoses Jules' longtime friend Arthur Jarvis (J. Pat O'Malley) with a brain tumor and tells him he is terminally ill. While Jules and David feud over the diagnosis, Arthur resigns himself to his fate; but Jules does not want him to give up. Guest appearances: Robert Lussier and Dean Santoro
2	2	"Love and Death"	Noam Pitlik	Steve Gordon	February 6, 1976
Jules treats a patient named Barbara Simms (Marge Redmond) for a thyroid condition and finds that she is suicidal because her husband has left her for another woman. He is sympathetic, but Barbara interprets his sympathy as a romantic interest in her. Pondering how to tell her that he is not interested in romance without making her become suicidal again, he decides upon an unorthodox treatment. Guest appearance: Ruth Manning
3	3	"The Vote"	Richard Kinon	T : Steve Gordon; S/T : James Ritz	February 13, 1976
When it comes time to vote for a new chief of internal medicine for the hospital, Jules is forced to choose between David and Dr. Herb Chisholm (Severn Darden) – a brilliant and visionary physician who is also unkempt and absent-minded. Jules chooses Chisholm, much to David's dismay. Guest appearance: Ken Olfson
4	4	"Molly and Jim"	Bill Persky	S : Tom Dunsmuir & Dan Wilcox; T : Steve Gordon	February 20, 1976
Molly falls in love with one of Jules' patients. Guest appearance: James T. Callahan
5	5	"The Choice"	Richard Kinon	Steve Gordon, John Boni & Norman Stiles	February 27, 1976
When Frankie Nyles (Vic Tayback), a known drug dealer, sees Jules for treatment of recurring bad headaches, Jules determines that he needs an operation. Jules does not want to treat a drug dealer, but his conscience won't let him turn Nyles away. Guest appearances: Joseph R. Sicari and Robert Miller Driscoll
6	6	"The Unsinkable Molly Gibbons"	Bill Persky	Ann Gibbs & Joel Kimmel	March 12, 1976
Molly fakes a series of dental work to cover for the fact that she's seeing David as a patient.
7	7	"The Down Payment"	Bill Persky	S : Bruce Kane; T : Steve Gordon & Arnold Somkin	March 19, 1976
Burglars break into Jules' office, ransack it, and steal his medical supplies. David offers to loan him the money he needs to put his office back in order. At first Jules does not want the loan, but he later gives in and says he will accept it – when David no longer wants to loan the money.
8	8	"Jules' Vacation"	Noam Pitlik	Simon Muntner	April 2, 1976
An overworked Jules grudgingly agrees to take a vacation in Florida, but he can't resist practicing medicine while he is there. Guest appearances: Dave Shelley, Penny Santon and Naomi Stevens
9	9	"The Nose"	Bill Persky	Bud Wiser	April 9, 1976
Jules promises an old friend to talk one of David's patients out of getting cosmetic surgery. Guest appearance: Titos Vandis
10	10	"Molly's Mistake"	Noam Pitlik	Michael Turner	April 16, 1976
Molly makes a grave mistake and loses confidence in herself.
11	11	"Jenny's Despair"	Bill Persky	Warren Murphy	April 23, 1976
Jenny accuses Jules of meddling in how she and David are raising Paul and Tony.
12	12	"Jules & Eddie"	Noam Pitlik	Jack Ainob & Bruce Selitz	April 30, 1976
Eddie (Bryan Scott), a recently orphaned boy who is one of Jules' patients, gets along very well with Jules and wants Jules to adopt him. Jules, however, thinks that his long working hours would be bad for Eddie's upbringing and instead looks for a set of great parents who will adopt Eddie – much to Eddie's disappointment. Guest appearances: Richard Venture and Mary Betten
13	13	"Jules and the Bum"	Bill Persky	Steve Gordon & Arnold Somkin	May 7, 1976
Although Jules thinks it is a bad idea, David takes in a once-acclaimed novelist who is one of his boyhood idols and has fallen on hard times – and discovers that even though the man has impeccable manners and courtly charm, he also drinks too much and engages in fraud. Guest appearances: Victor Bruno and Mary Wilcox
14	14	"Jules' Investment"	Bill Persky	Steve Gordon, Arnold Somkin & Bruce Kane	May 14, 1976
Jules invests his life savings into one of David's real-estate schemes. Guest appearances: William Cort and Raymond Serra

=== Season 2 (1976–77) ===
No. overall	No. in series	Title	Directed by	Written by	Original release date
15	1	"The Dream"	Noam Pitlik	Steve Gordon, Sam Denoff & Dale McRaven	October 13, 1976
An eccentric psychic named Matilda Morrison (Lucille Ball) sees Jules because she is having headaches and visions that foretell her death in three weeks. Jules at first thinks that he should refer her to a psychiatrist, but then discovers that her visions turn out to be correct 80 percent of the time.
16	2	"Helen's Beau"	Tony Mordente	Sam Denoff & Dale McRaven	October 22, 1976
Jules arranges a date for Helen with a young medical intern, Dr. Byron Fisk (Barry Gordon). She thinks Byron is her new boyfriend – but is the last to realize that Byron is homosexual. Guest appearance: Lila Teigh
17	3	"Judy Sinclair"	Noam Pitlik	Steve Gordon	October 27, 1976
A tough and stubborn patient named Judy Sinclair (Marlo Thomas) needs an operation. The single mother of a little mentally disabled boy, she is determined not to undergo the procedure because of her fear of leaving her son alone. In the end, the Bedfords take care of the boy and Judy has her operation. Guest appearance: Matthew Laborteaux
18	4	"It's All in the Head"	Tony Mordente	Bernie Kahn	November 3, 1976
David hires a sexy woman named Rhonda Curtis (Caren Kaye) as his new secretary. He is attracted to her and has trouble resisting temptation when she makes advances toward him. They take a business trip together, infuriating Jules, but in the end, Jules' meddling saves David from committing adultery. Guest appearance: Carol Worthington
19	5	"The Snow Job"	George Tyne	Jerome Chodorov	December 1, 1976
A blizzard hits New York City, and David's apartment loses power – and then a pregnant woman in labor and her husband arrive at his door in need of medical help. Guest appearances: Yvonne Wilder, William Cort, Art Metrano, Jayne Meadows and Ivor Francis
20	6	"A Doctor's Doctor"	Tony Mordente	Mark Tuttle	December 8, 1976
Jules ends up in the hospital with painful cramps and is told he needs a gall bladder operation, but he does not want David to perform it. Guest appearances: Bill Dana, Sarina C. Grant, Harry Gold and Robert Miller Driscoll
21	7	"Carlotta"	Noam Pitlik	George Yanok	December 22, 1976
An old flame tries to tempt Jules into marriage by promising a large donation to the hospital. Guest appearance: Edie Adams
22	8	"Jules Takes a Partner"	Bill Persky	S : Emma Fligg; T : Frank Tarloff	December 29, 1976
Jules takes his friend Dr. Michael Harrigan (David Huddleston) into his practice to keep him from retiring – and then regrets it. Guest appearance: Ralph Manza
23	9	"Oh, Brother"	Noam Pitlik	Rick Mittleman	January 26, 1977
Jules' deadbeat, money-grubbing, ne'er-do-well brother Harry (Jan Murray), from whom he has been estranged for many years, comes to visit, and David and Jenny arrange a surprise meeting between them. The two stubborn brothers fight at first, but after Jules learns that Harry may be dying, they become cordial – until the check that Harry writes to Jules to pay back the money he owes him bounces. Guest appearance: Robert Lussier
24	10	"Jules & Lenny"	Noam Pitlik	Bernie Kahn & Rick Mittleman	Unaired
Jules wants Lenny (Mike Evans) to pass his medical exams and lets Lenny stay with him so he can study without the distractions of home – but Jules' meddling in Lenny's studying turns out to be a big distraction. Guest appearances: Ysabel MacCloskey, Paula Sills and Michael Danahy
25	11	"Mulligan"	Noam Pitlik	Jim Rogers	Unaired
Jules' best friend, a police officer named Mulligan, dies while pursuing a purse-snatcher. Left alone in the room where Mulligan's sheet-covered body lies, Jules holds a lengthy one-sided conversation with the deceased man in which he reminisces at length about their friendship.
26	12	"Jules in Jail"	Noam Pitlik	Richard Baer	Unaired
Jules is arrested while making a very unusual house call.
27	13	"Molly & Jules"	Bill Perksy	Bernie Kahn	Unaired
Molly is fed up with being taken for granted both professionally and personally; it's up to Jules to change things or let her go.
