= Comedy Time =

American television anthology series

- Genre: Anthology series
- Country of origin: United States
- Original language: English
- No. of seasons: 1
- No. of episodes: 8

Production
- Running time: 30 minutes (Wednesdays); 60 minutes (Thursdays)

Original release
- Network: NBC
- Release: July 6 – September 1, 1977

Comedy Time is an American anthology television series that aired on NBC in the summer of 1977. In a mix of 30-minute and 60-minute episodes, it aired unsold television pilots for situation comedies.

== Background ==
The practice of television executives of ordering dozens of pilots for proposed television series each year – far more than their networks could possibly broadcast as series – created a sizable body of unsold pilots that had never aired. Packaging these unsold pilots in anthology series and airing them during the summer provided television networks with a way of both providing fresh programming during the summer rerun season and recouping at least some of the expense of producing them. Comedy Time was one of these series, aired by NBC in the summer of 1977, and it consisted of unsold pilots for situation comedies. Stars appearing in the series included Bill Bixby, Michael Constantine, Barbara Feldon, and Annie Potts.

== Broadcast history ==
Comedy Time premiered on July 6, 1977, as a 30-minute show airing a single unsold pilot from 9:30 to 10:00 p.m. Eastern Time on Wednesdays. On July 21, it became a twice-a-week program when a 60-minute version of the show premiered, airing two unsold pilots between 8:00 and 9:00 p.m. on Thursdays. The 30-minute Wednesday episodes came to an end after the broadcast of July 27, and the 60-minute Thursday broadcast went into hiatus after the episode that aired on July 28. The Thursday broadcasts resumed on August 25, and Comedy Time′s run ended a week later with the episode aired on September 1. In all, Comedy Time broadcast 12 unsold pilots during its run.

== Episodes ==
No. in season	Title	Directed by	Written by	Original release date
1	"The Natural Look"	Robert Moore	Leonora Thuna	July 6, 1977
A liberated woman who works as an executive at a cosmetics firm finds it difficult to deal with the demands her new husband makes on her. Starring Barbara Feldon and Bill Bixby.
2	"Susan and Sam"	Jay Sandrich	Alan Alda	July 13, 1977
Two newspaper reporters find that competition at work is threatening their romantic relationship. Starring Robert Foxworth and Christine Belford.
3	"Daughters"	Bob Claver	Susan Harris	July 20, 1977
A police chief must raise his three daughters on his own. Starring Michael Constantine and Julie Bovasso.
4	"Hollywood High: It Didn't Happen One Night"	Burt Brinckerhoff	David Pollock, Elias Davis, & Lloyd Garver	July 21, 1977
4	"Hollywood High: Friends and Other Strangers "	Burt Brinckeroff	David Pollock, Elias Davis, & Lloyd Garver	July 21, 1977
A two-part pilot based on a film of the same name aired as the first Thursday episode and first 60-minute episode of Comedy Time. In "It Didn't Happen One Night," airing at 8:00, high school students Paula and Eugene find that they must share a motel room while working on a school paper. In "Friends and Other Strangers," airing at 8:30, Paula arranges a date for Eugene with the school's most popular girl by writing a school paper for the girl. Starring Annie Potts and Darrin O'Connor.
5	"Look Out World"	Hy Averback	Al Gordon, E. Duke Vincent, & Hal Goldman	July 27, 1977
A story about the four owners of a car wash in California. Starring Michael Huddleston and Rustin Lord. The last Wednesday episode and last 30-minute episode of Comedy Time.
6	"Instant Family"	Russ Petranto	Morton Lachman & Ray Brenner	July 28, 1977
6	"Bay City Amusement Company"	Gary Shimokawa & Norman Steinberg	David Isaacs & Ken Levine	July 28, 1977
In "Instant Family," airing at 8:00, two single fathers who live in the same house want to raise their sons in their own ways, but have very different ideas about how to do it. Starring William Daniels and Lou Criscuolo. In "Bay City Amusement Company," airing at 8:30, the top executive at a television station in San Francisco, California, must deal with the antics of his employees. Starring Terry Kiser and June Gable.
7	"Riding High"	Lee Philips	Larry Gelbart	August 25, 1977
7	"Calling Dr. Storm"	James Burrows	Fred Freeman & Lawrence J. Cohen	August 25, 1977
In "Riding High," airing at 8:00, a man hoping to become a screenwriter works as an extra for a movie company. Starring Charlie Frank. "Calling Dr. Storm," airing at 8:30, tells the story of a bumbling but dedicated surgeon. Starring Larry Linville and Bruce Gordon.
8	"The Rubber Gun Squad"	Hy Averback	Sid Dorfman & Simon Muntner	September 1, 1977
8	"Good Penny"	Joseph Bologna	Joseph Bologna & Renee Taylor	September 1, 1977
In "The Rubber Gun Squad," airing at 8:00, inept New York City Police Department misfits are ordered to patrol Central Park — without carrying guns. Starring Andy Romano and Lenny Baker. In "Good Penny," airing at 8:30, a pregnant housewife with two children whose husband has abandoned her becomes involved in unusual group therapy. Starring Renee Taylor.
