= Sirota's Court =

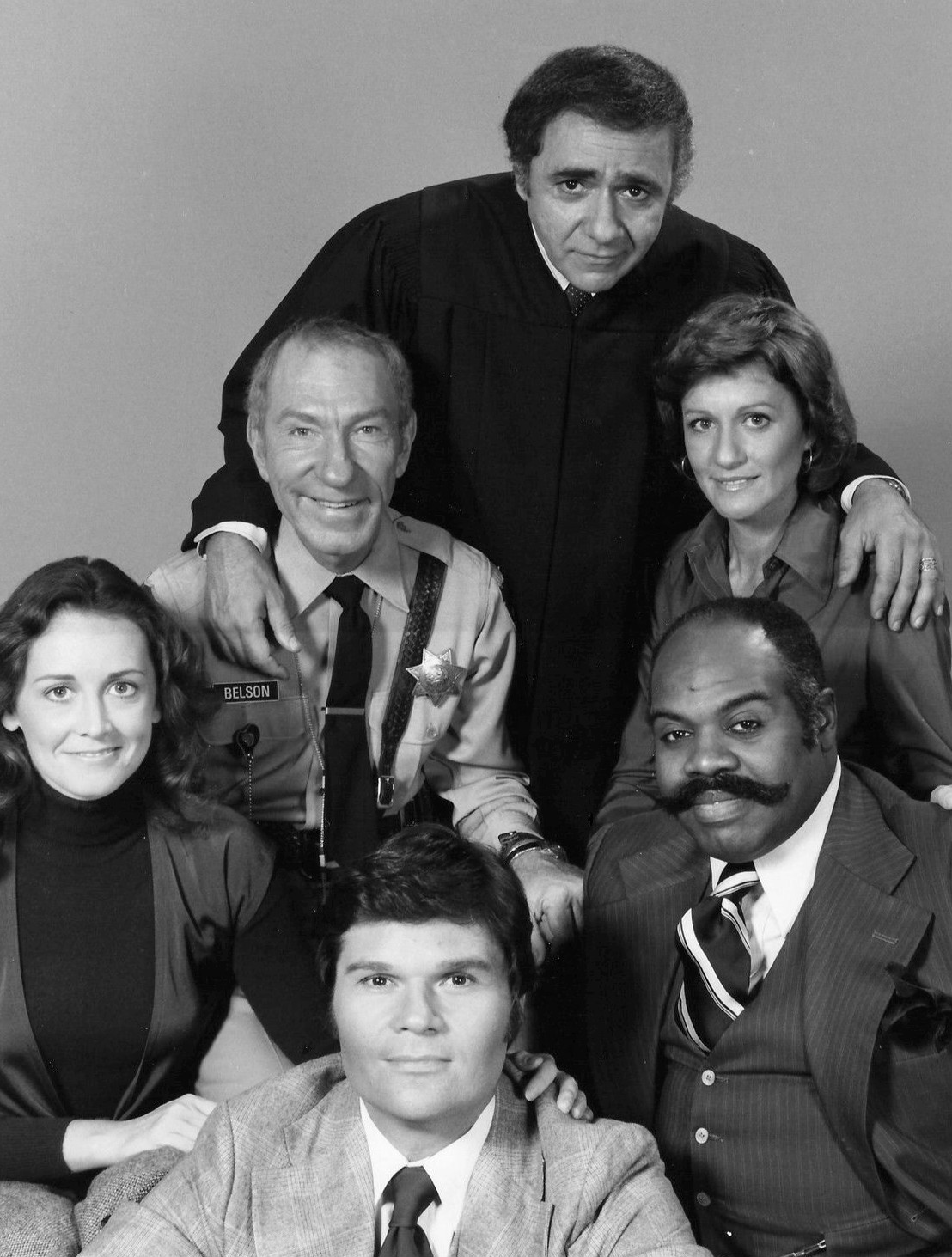
- Genre: Sitcom
- Starring: Michael Constantine; Cynthia Harris; Fred Willard
- Country of origin: United States
- Original language: English
- No. of seasons: 1
- No. of episodes: 13 (3 unaired)

Production
- Producers: Harvey Miller and Peter Engel
- Running time: 30 minutes
- Production company: Universal Television

Original release
- Network: NBC
- Release: December 1, 1976 – April 13, 1977

Sirota's Court is an American television sitcom that aired on NBC on Wednesday nights from December 1, 1976 to April 13, 1977.

== Premise ==
The series centered on Matthew J. Sirota, a night court judge in a large metropolitan city. Others shown were court clerk Maureen O'Connor (with whom Sirota had an on-again-off-again affair), public defender Gail Goodman, District Attorney Bud Nugent, attorney Sawyer Dabney, and Bailiff John Bellson.

The episode "Court Fear" featured the first gay marriage ever shown on network television. Judge Sirota notes that the law does not explicitly state that a marriage can only be between a man and woman, and decides to perform the ceremony, though warning that upper courts might invalidate the marriage. He also asks the couple to shake hands and not kiss, pronouncing them "man and--uh--other man", with the writers already knowing they were pushing the boundaries of network television. The idea for the storyline was sparked by a same sex wedding which occurred in Arizona in 1975.

Producer Peter Engel commented in 2016 that the show was never officially cancelled but just "sort of faded away," and he was heartbroken that it did not succeed. "However, we were before our time. In 1977, we did a gay wedding on television. I must've been out of my mind (laughs). ... We did things that were outrageous at that time and, quite frankly, NBC was afraid of it." While some seem to have complained about the gay marriage storyline in one episode (it was only one of the plotlines in that episode), it did not get much attention at the time. The real major problem the show had was its time slot—a "death slot" first opposite All in the Family, and then against Alice.

The show's close similarity in concept to Night Court, which debuted in 1984 and lasted nine seasons, has been noticed.

The show debuted on December 1, 1976, as an early season replacement. While it had good critical reviews, they did not translate into ratings. Its best ratings only reached 20 percent of the viewing audience, and its viability was very shaky with the network waffling on whether to cancel it or keep it running. Finally cancelled after seven episodes had played in January 1977, but with six unaired episodes, the network brought it back briefly in April 1977 in a new later time slot, but it fared no better after a few more episodes had aired.

== Cast ==
- Michael Constantine as Judge Matthew J. Sirota
- Cynthia Harris as Maureen O'Connor
- Kathleen Miller as Gail Goodman
- Fred Willard as D.A. Bud Nugent
- Ted Ross as Sawyer Dabney
- Owen Bush as Bailiff John Bellson

== Episodes ==
No.	Title	Directed by	Written by	Original release date
1	"The Reporter"	Mel Ferber	Jack Winter	December 1, 1976
2	"Sirota's Car"	Mel Ferber	Jim Parker	December 8, 1976
3	"The Election"	Mel Ferber	Judy Ervin & Christopher Thompson & Marc Sotkin	December 22, 1976
4	"Court Fear"	Mel Ferber	Jack Winter	December 29, 1976
5	"The Hooker"	Unknown	Jack Winter	January 12, 1977
6	"The Judge"	Mel Ferber	Gary Markowitz	January 19, 1977
7	"D.A./D.O.A."	Harvey Miller	Jim Parker	January 26, 1977
8	"Pilot"	Unknown	Unknown	April 6, 1977
9	"The Split-Up"	Unknown	Unknown	April 13, 1977
10	"The Alien"	N/A	N/A	Unaired
11	"The Old Friend"	N/A	N/A	Unaired
12	"Snake and the Old People"	Mel Ferber	Story by : Michael Kagan & Jordan Tabat & Carole Ita White; Teleplay by : Jordan Tabat & Carole Ita White	Unaired
13	"The Vacation"	Mel Ferber	Kenny Solms	Unaired
