= Muroc Maru =

Replica of a Japanese Takao-class cruiser

AAF Temporary Building (Target) T-799 "Muroc Maru"
- Part of Muroc Army Air Base
- Rogers Dry Lake, California
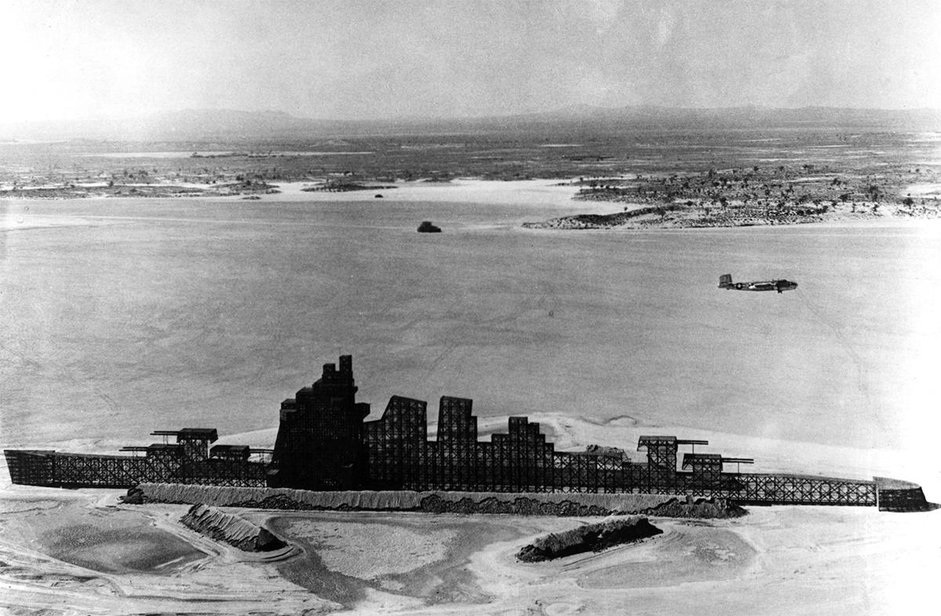
- The "Muroc Maru" overflown by a B-25 Mitchell

Site information
- Type: Target facility
- Open to the public: No
- Condition: Razed

Location
- Coordinates: 34°50′40″N 117°53′24″W

Site history
- Built: 1943
- Built by: U.S. Army Air Forces
- In use: 1943–1950
- Demolished: 1950

Garrison information
- Garrison: Edwards Air Force Base, California

Muroc Maru, officially AAF Temporary Building (Target) T-799, was a replica of a Japanese Takao-class cruiser constructed on the floor of Rogers Dry Lake in southern California during World War II. Used to train bomber pilots and bombardiers in techniques for attacking warships, Muroc Maru remained in place until 1950, when it was demolished.

== Construction ==
AAF Temporary Building (Target) T-799 was built during 1943 on the southern end of Rogers Dry Lake in California for the purpose of training United States Army Air Forces bomber pilots, navigators and bombardiers in bombing, strafing, and the identification of warships, including skip bombing techniques. The lakebed site was chosen for the training site as its flat base resembled the ocean, reinforced by the bright sand dunes sculpted to give the appearance of a wake around the 'ship'.

Designed to mimic the size and appearance of a Takao-class heavy cruiser of the Imperial Japanese Navy, the structure was constructed from four-by-four lumber and chicken wire, with tar paper covering the "hull" to complete the illusion of a solid, fully constructed ship. The structure cost $35,819.18 to build ($705,802 in 2025 dollars).

== Operational history ==
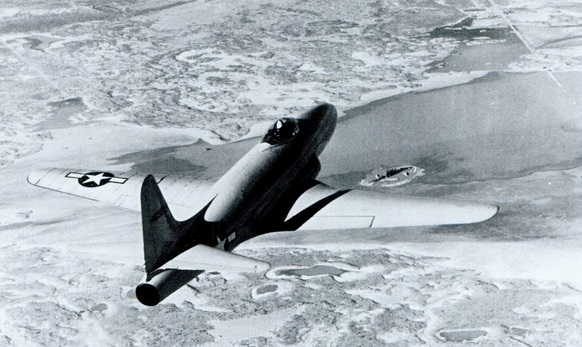
The Lockheed XF-14 overflying the "Muroc Maru"

Upon completion of the structure, Army Air Force pilots assigned to train at the nearby Muroc Army Air Field – now Edwards Air Force Base – using the "ship" gave it the nickname Muroc Maru, after the location of the vessel and "Maru" being a common suffix for Japanese ship names. The structure was used for training until 1950, when it was declared a hazard to air navigation and disassembled following clearance of unexploded ordnance.

== See also ==
- USS Recruit (1917)
- USS Commodore (401B)
- USS Recruit (TDE-1)
