= USS Recruit =

Three ships of the United States Navy have been named USS Recruit:

- USS Recruit (1917), a wooden "battleship" built in New York City's Union Square in 1917 as a recruiting tool, decommissioned in 1920.
- USS Recruit (AM-285), launched in 1943, was an Admirable-class minesweeper, and placed in reserve in 1946, and was sold to the Mexican Navy in 1963.
- USS Recruit (TDE-1) is a stationary, landlocked training ship at Naval Training Center San Diego. Commissioned in 1949, decommissioned in 1967, and recommissioned in 1982, she was in continuous service from 1949 until the base closed in 1997.
