= E. Nick: A Legend in His Own Mind =

- Directed by: Robert Hegyes
- Written by: Peter Isacksen; Mort Richman
- Produced by: Paul Hertzberg
- Starring: Don Calfa; Cleavon Little; Pat McCormick; Andra Akers; Monique Gabrielle; Carol Wayne; Jonathan Winters; Carlos Palomino; Dean Torrence; Bo Hopkins; Betty Thomas; Jay Johnson; John Sylvester White; Elaine Joyce; Robert Mandan; Robert Hegyes; Robert Sacchi; Chai Lee; Kim Morris
- Distributed by: CineTel Films
- Release date: 1984

E. Nick: A Legend in His Own Mind (1984) is the first direct-to-video feature film.

"a jaw-dropping tsunami of slumming character actors, struggling comedians and accommodating friends of director Robert Hegyes" - Steven Puchalski, 2018

== Plot ==
E. Nick Vanacuzzi, an adult film producer, hosts a premiere release party for a video magazine, Bon Vivant Magazine, at his mansion in California. During the event, comedians and celebrity guests interact, leading to escalating conflicts.

== Cast ==
- Don Calfa as E. Nick Vanacuzzi
- Eddie Deezen Nicky Vanacuzzi. Jr.
- Cleavon Little as Edmundo
- Pat McCormick as Sonny Patterson
- Andra Akers as Aunt Mona
- Monique Gabrielle as Charmaine
- Carol Wayne as Regine
- Jonathan Winters as Emerson Foosnagel III
- Carlos Palomino as Carlos Palomino
- Dean Torrence as Dean Torrence
- Bo Hopkins as Bo Hopkins
- Betty Thomas as Betty Thomas
- Wayne Newton as Wayne Newton
- Jay Johnson as Jay Johnson
- John Sylvester White as Harry
- Elaine Joyce as Joyce
- Peter Isacksen as Mel Millman
- James Widdoes as The Reporter
- Robert Mandan as Earl
- Robert Hegyes as Raoul
- Robert Sacchi as "Mr. Trowel", doing his Humphrey Bogart impression
- Paul Hertzberg as Parking Valet
- Lisa M. Hansen as Executive (as Lisa Hansen)
- Chai Lee as Nymphet
- Kim Morris as Nymphet

== Production ==
On 30 November 1983, CineTel Films began production on E. Nick: A Legend in His Own Mind, and was released as the first direct-to-video film in 1984.

Crew included: director of photography Amir Mokri, second unit director John Dahl, camera operator Alex Nepomniaschy, and second unit camera operator Marvin V. Rush.

== Reception ==
"Alas, Hegyes directorial skills are nonexistent, with the entire project often feeling like it was actually filmed in one frantic afternoon. - Steven Puchalski, 2018
