= Recruit =

Recruit may refer to:

== Military ==
- Military recruitment
- Recruit training, in the military
- Rekrut (English: Recruit), a military recruit or low rank in German-speaking countries
- Seaman recruit

=== Ships ===
- HMS Recruit, several ships of the British Royal Navy
- USS Recruit, several ships of the U.S. Navy

== Books ==
- Le Réquisitionnaire (English "The Conscript" or "The Recruit"), a 1831 short story by Honoré de Balzac
- The Recruit (novel), the first book of the children's CHERUB series

== Film and television ==
- The Recruit (film), a 2003 film starring Al Pacino and Colin Farrell
- The Recruit (Australian TV series), a 2014–2016 Australian rules football reality television series
- The Recruit (American TV series), a 2022 American spy-adventure television series released by Netflix
- "The Recruit" (Dad's Army), an episode of the 1973 British TV series Dad's Army
- "The Recruit" (Star Wars Resistance)
- Recruits (film), a 1986 screwball comedy
- Recruits (TV series), a 2009 Australian TV series about the New South Wales Police Force
- Recruits: Paramedics, a 2011 Australian factual television program about New South Wales Paramedics

== Other uses ==
- Recruit (company), a Japanese advertising, publishing, and human resources company

== See also ==
- Recruitment
- College recruiting, in college athletics in the United States
