= C.P.O. Sharkey =

American television sitcom (1976–1978)

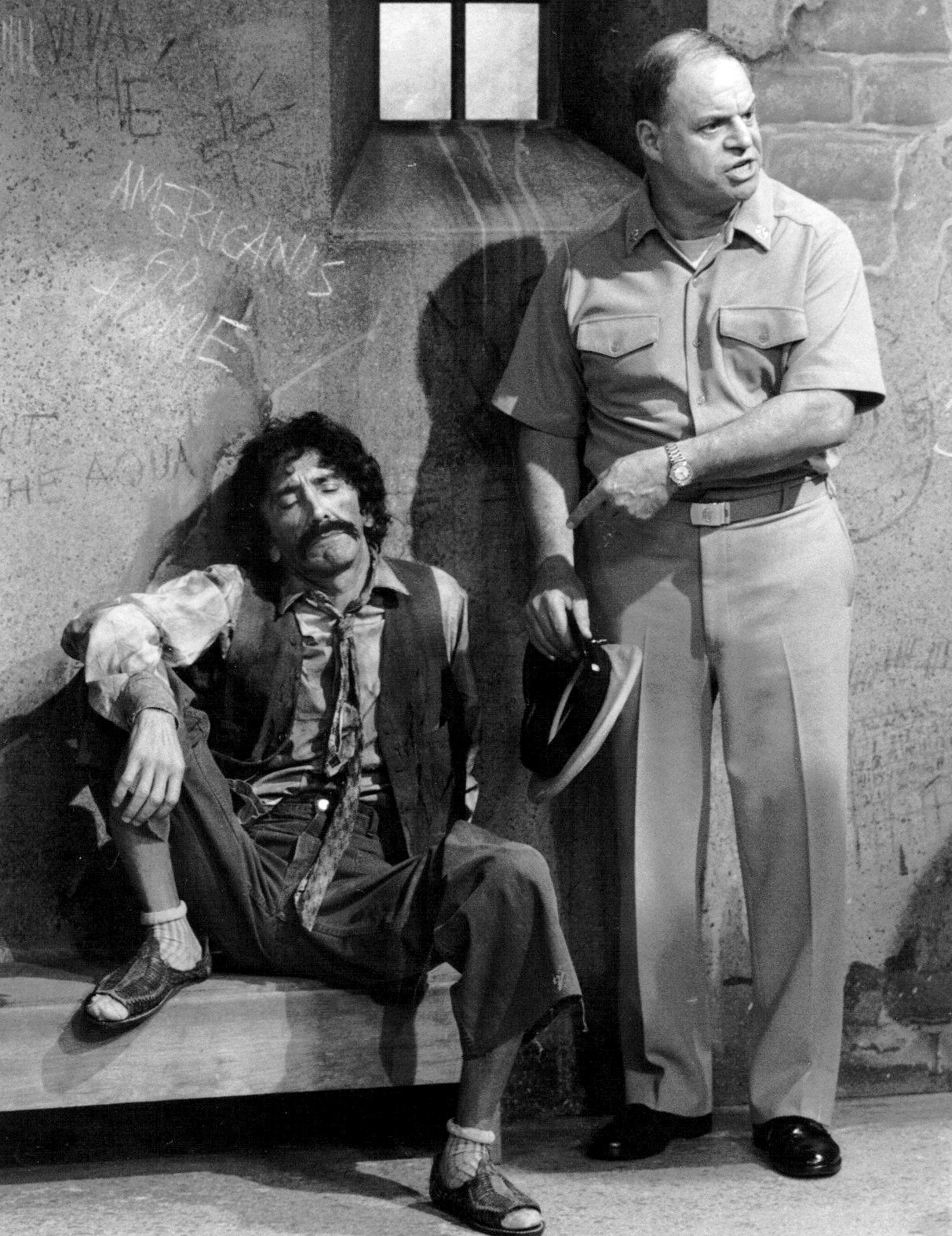
- Sharkey winds up in a Tijuana jail after trying to bail out his men
- Genre: Sitcom
- Created by: Aaron Ruben
- Directed by: Peter Baldwin; Russ Petranto; Mel Ferber
- Starring: Don Rickles; Peter Isacksen; Elizabeth Allen; Harrison Page; Richard X. Slattery
- Composer: Peter Matz
- Country of origin: United States
- Original language: English
- No. of seasons: 2
- No. of episodes: 37

Production
- Executive producer: Aaron Ruben
- Producers: Aaron Ruben; Gene Marcione
- Running time: 30 minutes
- Production companies: R&R Productions

Original release
- Network: NBC
- Release: December 1, 1976 – April 28, 1978

CPO Sharkey is an American television sitcom, created by Aaron Ruben, that aired on NBC from December 1, 1976, to April 28, 1978. The series starred Don Rickles in the title role, with Peter Isacksen, Elizabeth Allen, Harrison Page, and Richard X. Slattery featured in the cast. Rickles, who actually served in the Navy during World War II, was already well-known for the indiscriminate insult comedy he used in his stand-up routines and in guest appearances on other TV shows and specials. CPO Sharkey was the third TV series that provided him with a regular vehicle for his humor. (Two previous series in which he starred, both eponymously titled The Don Rickles Show—one a 1968 variety show, the other a 1972 sitcom—each aired for one season.)

== Premise ==
Don Rickles is U.S. Navy Chief Petty Officer Otto Sharkey, an abrasive career Navy man stationed at a San Diego naval base, in charge of Company 144, a group of seaman recruits. Sharkey initially comes off as callous, sarcastic, and insulting to everyone around him, but underneath his harsh exterior, he genuinely cares for his men and often goes to great lengths to help with their problems.

== Cast of characters ==
Members of Company 144 come from a motley mix of ethnicities, including:

- CPO Otto Sharkey, the titular character, is portrayed by Don Rickles.
- Seaman Lester Pruitt (Peter Isacksen), Sharkey's assistant, is a tall, lunkheaded Southerner, who often shares his homespun homilies with the uninterested Sharkey.
- Daniels (Jeff Hollis) is a hip black man.
- Kowalski (Tom Ruben) is Polish.
- Skolnick (David Landsberg) is a Jewish New Yorker.
- Mignone (Barry Pearl) is Italian. (Season 1 only)
- Rodriguez (Richard Beauchamp) is a Puerto Rican.
- Apodaca (Phillip Simms, season 2) (Note: Seaman Apodaca first appears in S1•E11, but then is not seen again until S2•E1 onward.)

Others on the base include:

- CPO Dave Robinson (Harrison Page) is Sharkey's colleague and closest friend on the base.
- Lieutenant Whipple (Jonathan Daly) is Sharkey's immediate superior, whose complacency and buck teeth are fodder for Sharkey, though for obvious reasons, he never insults Whipple to his face.
- Captain Quinlan (Elizabeth Allen) is the newly appointed female base commander during season one, whom Sharkey had a hard time accepting at first.
- Captain Buckner (Richard X. Slattery) replaced Quinlan in season two. A former submarine commander and hard-nosed career man, Buckner usually gets right in Sharkey's face and barks orders in a rapid-fire manner, rendering Sharkey unable to respond except in a civil manner.
- Seaman Shimokawa (Evan C. Kim) is a Japanese immigrant (only appears in a handful of early season-one episodes).

The opening credits showed Sharkey on the USS Recruit, a landlocked training ship of the U.S. Navy located at Naval Training Center San Diego.

== Production ==
Creator Aaron Ruben had formerly written scripts for the hit military sitcom The Phil Silvers Show (Sgt. Bilko). Ruben invited scripts from three other Bilko writers: Tony Webster, Gary Belkin, and Arnie Rosen. Rickles had portrayed a different CPO in the 1961 episode "Professional Sailor" of the CBS military drama-comedy, Hennesey, starring Jackie Cooper.

== Running gags and precedents ==
In the earliest episodes of the series, Sharkey often ended conversations with each of his recruits by giving them the evil eye and saying "I'm gonna keep an ey-y-y-e on you".

Pruitt, who stood 6 feet 7 inches (2.01 m), would invariably hunch forward, looking over the 5 ft 6 in (1.68 m) Sharkey when addressing him face-to-face; Sharkey found it uncomfortable to speak to Pruitt this way, and would make snide remarks about Pruitt's height or a mistake he made. (The July 9–16, 1977 cover of TV Guide showed Rickles and Isacksen in character, with Sharkey standing on a foot locker so he could physically be eye-to-eye with a surprised Pruitt.) Some of Sharkey's insults toward Pruitt included:

- "Why don't you put bicycle pedals in your ears and ride yourself outta here!"
- "Why don't you go elope with a moose!"
- "The last time I saw a head like that was on a wall over a bar in Teaneck, New Jersey! Ya big dummy!!"

Lt. Whipple often lectured Sharkey. When he left the room (after bellowing "Carry on!" in his piping voice), Sharkey would often look in the camera and imitate Whipple's buck teeth. He referred to him as Lieutenant Bugs Bunny.

The series was the first primetime sitcom to depict the burgeoning punk rock music scene, with The Dickies, a band from the San Fernando Valley, making a guest appearance in season two.

== The Tonight Show cigarette box incident ==
Rickles was a guest on the December 13, 1976 episode of The Tonight Show, which that night was guest hosted by Bob Newhart. During his time he accidentally broke Johnny Carson's wooden cigarette box, an heirloom that he had kept on his desk on set since 1967. Rickles was doing a gag as an immigration agent and was using Carson's cigarette box as a rubber stamp on papers. After one particularly hard slam, Rickles noticed that the box was broken and went into mock panic.

Carson returned to the show the following night and quickly noticed the broken box. Bandleader Doc Severinsen, who was sitting in for the absent Ed McMahon, explained that Rickles broke it the night before after "having a fit" when a joke didn't go well. When told that CPO Sharkey was taping nearby, Carson, broken box in hand, took a camera crew and barged into the adjacent studio as they were taping a scene and yelled at Rickles, all to the delight of the studio audiences of both shows. Carson mocked Rickles's comedic style, calling him a "big dummy", and also teased actor Harrison Page, speaking to him in an exaggerated jive accent. As Carson prepared to leave, Rickles announced him to his own audience; Carson turned on his heels and mockingly glared at Rickles shouting, "They know who I am!" and playfully slapped his face before walking back into his own studio.

On 13 November 1978, nearly seven months after CPO Sharkey had ended, Rickles, this time guest-hosting The Tonight Show himself while talking with guest Carroll O'Connor, inattentively started slamming Carson's new cigarette box on the desk, but stopped when he realized what he was doing; this time, the box remained intact.

The original incident was often replayed in Tonight Show retrospectives. It was also featured in Mr. Warmth: The Don Rickles Project. In a 2005 interview with The New York Times, Rickles said that the incident was a genuine accident, but Carson and he played up the drama. "Knowing Johnny, he milked it a little bit. And I added to it." He also said he had no idea that Carson would barge in on his set that day. "I was really taken. In those days, those were bigger cameras than they are today. To schlep all that stuff into the other studio was quite an event." A clip of the event is included as bonus feature on the season-one DVD set.

== Broadcast history ==
Season	Time slot (ET)
1976–77	Wednesday at 8:00–8:30 pm (episodes 1–7); Wednesday at 9:00–9:30 pm (episodes 8–14); Wednesday at 9:30–10:00 pm (episode 15)
1977–78	Friday at 8:00–8:30 pm (episodes 1–12); Friday at 8:30–9:00 pm (episodes 13–22)

== Reruns ==
Reruns aired on Ha!, which became Comedy Central, in the early 1990s. C.P.O Sharkey is currently available on Tubi and Amazon Prime.

== Home media ==
On May 19, 2015, Time Life released CPO Sharkey – The Complete Season 1 on DVD in Region 1.

On September 22, 2015, Time Life released CPO Sharkey – The Complete Season 2 on DVD in Region 1.

== Episodes ==
=== Season 1 (1976–77) ===
No. overall	No. in season	Title	Directed by	Written by	Original release date
1	1	"Oh Captain! My Captain"	Peter Baldwin	Aaron Ruben	December 1, 1976
The chauvinistic chief must adjust to the fact that his new commanding officer is a woman.
2	2	"Shimokawa Ships Out"	Peter Baldwin	Story by : Walter Bien & Gene Farmer; Teleplay by : Aaron Ruben & Gene Farmer	December 8, 1976
An enlisted man thinks Sharkey is discriminating against him because he is Japanese.
3	3	"The Dear John Letter"	Peter Baldwin	Story by : Coslough Johnson; Teleplay by : Gene Farmer & Aaron Ruben	December 22, 1976
Chief Robinson suspects that Sharkey is a real ladies' man when he accidentally sees a "Dear Jane" letter in the typewriter.
4	4	"Goodbye Dolly"	Peter Baldwin	Aaron Ruben	December 29, 1976
The men try to hide an inflatable female doll in the barracks from Sharkey.
5	5	"Skolnick in Love"	Peter Baldwin	Story by : Richard Freiman & Stephen Young; Teleplay by : Aaron Ruben and Richard Freiman & Stephen Young	January 12, 1977
Shy recruit Skolnick decides to marry a cocktail waitress after a two-day courtship, much to everyone's surprise.
6	6	"Mignone's Mutiny"	Peter Baldwin	Story by : Larry Siegel; Teleplay by : Larry Siegel, Gene Farmer, & Aaron Ruben	January 19, 1977
Recruit Mignone's unhappiness with the rigors of boot camp spreads to the other men.
7	7	"Kowalski, the Somnambulist"	Peter Baldwin	Story by : Mort Scharfman; Teleplay by : Aaron Ruben & Mort Scharfman	January 26, 1977
Recruit Kowalski experiences repeated bouts of sleepwalking, for which Sharkey desperately tries to find a cure, or else the young man may face a medical discharge.
8	8	"Sunday in Tijuana"	Peter Baldwin	Aaron Ruben	February 9, 1977
Sharkey's romantic plans with Natalie are wrecked when his recruits get arrested in Tijuana, Mexico.
9	9	"Rodriguez and His Mamacita"	Peter Baldwin	Aaron Ruben	February 16, 1977
Recruit Rodriguez is just one of the sailors who get in trouble with Sharkey and the top brass for sneaking women into the barracks.
10	10	"Sharkey Boogies on Down"	Peter Baldwin	Story by : Mort Scharfman; Teleplay by : Aaron Ruben & Mort Scharfman	February 23, 1977
Chief Robinson takes Sharkey to a disco to celebrate his 45th birthday.
11	11	"Sharkey Finds Peace and Quiet"	Peter Baldwin	Story by : Rick Mittleman; Teleplay by : Rick Mittleman & Aaron Ruben	March 2, 1977
The chaos of barracks life leads Sharkey to dream of moving off-base to his own apartment.
12	12	"Sharkey the Marriage Counselor"	Peter Baldwin	Story by : Jim Rogers; Teleplay by : Aaron Ruben & Jim Rogers	March 9, 1977
Sharkey tries to help a fellow sailor with his marital problems.
13	13	"Sharkey's Secret Life"	Peter Baldwin	Story by : Bill Richmond & Gene Perret; Teleplay by : Aaron Ruben	March 16, 1977
The recruits are convinced Sharkey is gay after his clandestine meeting with an effeminate toupee salesman.
14	14	"The Pizza Party"	Peter Baldwin	Aaron Ruben	March 23, 1977
Pruitt plans a pizza party to celebrate the end of boot camp, but does not consult Sharkey.
15	15	"A Wino Is Loose"	Peter Baldwin	Aaron Ruben	March 23, 1977
Sharkey must remove a wino who spent the night in the barracks right before a major inspection.

=== Season 2 (1977–78) ===
No. overall	No. in season	Title	Directed by	Written by	Original release date
16	1	"The New Captain"	Mel Ferber	Tony Webster	October 21, 1977
The new captain proposes to shape up "the chief with the biggest beer belly", a fair description of the outraged Sharkey.
17	2	"Operation Frisco"	Mel Ferber	Arnie Rosen	November 4, 1977
Being assigned to submarine duty interferes with Sharkey's plans to have fun in San Francisco.
18	3	"Sharkey Flies over the Cuckoo's Nest"	Russ Petranto	Gary Belkin	November 11, 1977
A case of mistaken identity ensues when Sharkey reports to the base hospital for his routine physical and is mistaken for a mental patient.
19	4	"Don't Make Waves"	Russ Petranto	Arnie Rosen	November 18, 1977
Comical chaos ensues as Sharkey's barracks is chosen for an experiment in coed Navy living.
20	5	"Natalie's Ultimatum"	Mel Ferber	Aaron Ruben & Arnie Rosen	December 2, 1977
Sharkey's long time girlfriend, Natalie, tires of waiting and gives him an ultimatum about marriage in their relationship.
21	6	"Sharkey the Actor"	Mel Ferber	Arnie Rosen	December 9, 1977
Sharkey lands the lead in a Navy training film.
22	7	"Barracks Baby"	Russ Petranto	Story by : Howard Albrecht & Sol Weinstein; Teleplay by : Howard Albrecht, Sol Weinstein, Aaron Ruben & Arnie Rosen	December 30, 1977
Sharkey must hide a pregnant Mexican woman from INS officials in this Christmas-themed episode.
23	8	"Seven-Eleven Sharkey"	Russ Petranto	Story by : William Raynor & Myles Wilder; Teleplay by : William Raynor, Myles Wilder, Aaron Ruben & Arnie Rosen	January 6, 1978
Sharkey turns to the dice to help recruit Kowalski win back the money for his mother's trip to Poland that the young man had lost in a craps game.
24	9	"Forget Pearl Harbor"	Mel Ferber	Story by : William Raynor & Myles Wilder; Teleplay by : Aaron Ruben	January 13, 1978
The behavior of a visiting CPO from the Japanese Navy causes Sharkey to think that he may be a spy.
25	10	"Close Encounters of the Worst Kind"	Russ Petranto	Michael Brown & Andy Ruben	January 27, 1978
Sharkey's girlfriend, Natalie, accuses him of being insensitive.
26	11	"Pruitt's Paradise"	Russ Petranto	Arnie Rosen	February 3, 1978
Pruitt has been showing signs of lethargy, and Sharkey suspects it is due to a wild night life.
27	12	"Sharkey Meets Pruitt's Sister"	Russ Petranto	Aaron Ruben	February 17, 1978
Sharkey and the men try to scrounge up a woman to represent their barracks in the Navy's Miss Topside beauty contest.
28	13	"Sharkey's Back Problem"	Russ Petranto	Michael Brown & Andy Ruben	February 17, 1978
Sudden back pains lead Sharkey to worry that he will be ineligible for the "CPO of the Year" competition.
29	14	"It Happened One Night"	Russ Petranto	Story by : Bruce Kalish & Philip Wickham Taylor; Teleplay by : Bruce Kalish, Philip Wickham Taylor & Aaron Ruben	March 3, 1978
A bomb scare in the female recruits barracks forces them to be housed in Sharkey's building.
30	15	"Tell It to the Marines"	Russ Petranto	Arnie Rosen	March 10, 1978
Visiting Marines cause havoc at the training base, as their behavior tests the patience of Sharkey and the other sailors.
31	16	"Sharkey and the South American Way"	Russ Petranto	Aaron Ruben	March 17, 1978
Sharkey must instruct a visiting South American sailor in the ways of the United States Navy.
32	17	"Punk Rock Sharkey"	Russ Petranto	Michael Brown & Andy Ruben	March 24, 1978
Sharkey ventures into a punk-rock night spot to stop a fight, and comes out with a loose filling and the affections of a teenaged runaway.
33	18	"Pruitt, the Russian Flu-Carrier"	Russ Petranto	Aaron Ruben	March 31, 1978
Pruitt infects Sharkey and most of the recruit company with Russian flu, and Sharkey is overwhelmed by home-spun remedies.
34	19	"Captain's Right Hand Man"	Russ Petranto	Story by : Roland Wolpert; Teleplay by : Arnie Rosen	April 7, 1978
Much to both of their chagrins, Captain Buckner is forced to make Sharkey his personal aide.
35	20	"Fear of Flying"	Mel Ferber	Story by : Howard Albrecht & Sol Weinstein; Teleplay by : Howard Albrecht, Sol Weinstein, Aaron Ruben & Arnie Rosen	April 14, 1978
Sharkey reveals that he has a fear of flying and is terrifed at an upcoming flight he is required to take because of Navy business.
36	21	"The Even Couple"	Russ Petranto	Aaron Ruben	April 21, 1978
Sharkey moves off-base into an apartment to spice up his social life. His plan backfires when the recruits all show up just before a "last chance" date with Natalie yelling loud enough about problems that Sharkey gets tossed by his landlord.
37	22	"The Used-Car Caper"	Mel Ferber	Bob Booker & George Foster	April 28, 1978
Sharkey must come to the rescue when his recruits are swindled by a sleazy car salesman into buying a lemon.
