= Recruitment (disambiguation) =

Recruitment is the process of filling job vacancies with people.

Recruitment or recruiting may also refer to:

- Recruitment (biology), the process of developing the next generation of organisms
- College recruiting, the process in college athletics whereby coaches add new players to their roster
- Military recruitment, the process of requesting people to join a military voluntarily
- Motor unit recruitment, the progressive activation of a muscle
- The 17th century English process of filling vacant parliamentary seats during recruiter elections
- Recruitment (medicine), a medical condition of the inner ear that leads to reduced tolerance of loudness
- "Recruitment" (Agents of S.H.I.E.L.D.: Academy)

== See also ==
- Recruit
