= USS Recruit (1917) =

Landlocked US Navy training ship

Coordinates: 40.7356°N 73.9906°W

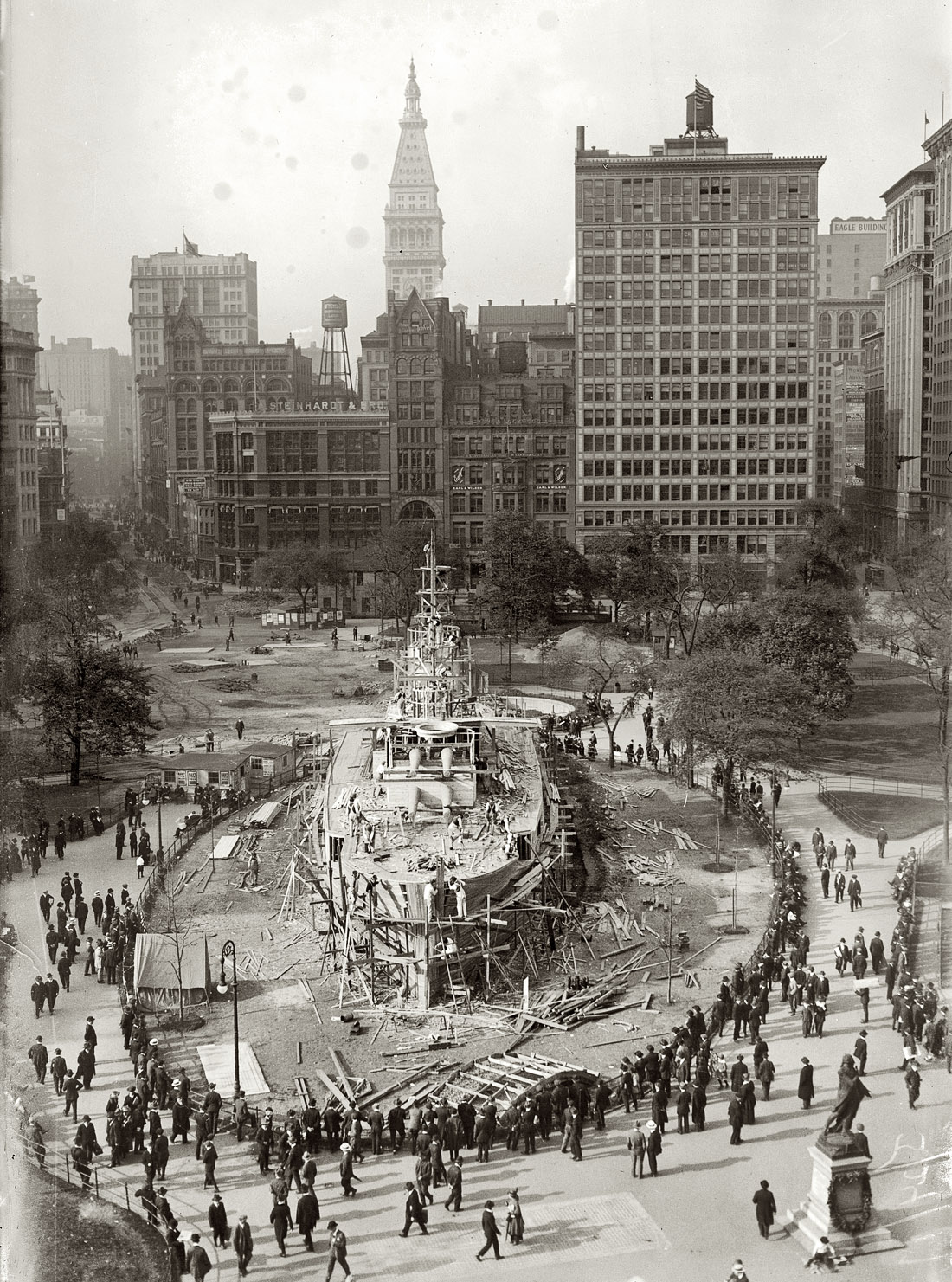
- The Landship Recruit under construction in Union Square in 1917.

History

United States
- Name: USS Recruit
- Builder: USN
- Commissioned: 1917
- Decommissioned: 1920
- Fate: Dismantled

General characteristics
- Length: 200 ft (61.0 m)
- Beam: 40 ft (12.192 m)
- Complement: 40
- Armament: Wooden guns

USS Recruit, also known as the Landship Recruit, was a wooden mockup of a dreadnought battleship constructed by the United States Navy in Manhattan in New York City, as a recruiting tool and training ship during the First World War. Commissioned as if it were a normal vessel of the U.S. Navy and manned by a crew of trainee sailors, Recruit was located in Union Square from 1917 until the end of the war. In 1920, with the reduced requirements for manning in the post-war Navy, Recruit was decommissioned and dismantled, having recruited 25,000 sailors into Navy service.

== Description ==
Operating as the U.S. Navy's headquarters for recruiting in the New York City district, Recruit was a fully rigged battleship, and was operated as a commissioned ship of the U.S. Navy. Under the command of Acting Captain C. F. Pierce and with a complement of thirty-nine bluejackets from the Newport Training Station for crew, Recruit served as a training ship in addition to being a recruiting office. The Navy also offered public access and tours of the ship, allowing civilians to familiarize themselves with how a Navy warship was operated.

The accommodations aboard Recruit included fore and aft examination rooms, full officer's quarters, a wireless station, a heating and ventilation system that was capable of changing the temperature of the air inside the ship ten times within the span of an hour, and cabins for the accommodation of the sailors of its crew.

Two high cage masts, a conning tower, and a single dummy smokestack matched Recruit's silhouette to the layout of seagoing U.S. battleships of the time. Three twin turrets contained a total of six wooden versions of 14-inch (360 mm) guns, providing the ship's 'main battery'. Ten wooden 5-inch (130 mm) guns in casemates represented the secondary anti-torpedo-boat weaponry of a battleship, while two replicas of one-pounder saluting guns completed the ship's 'armament'.

== Events ==
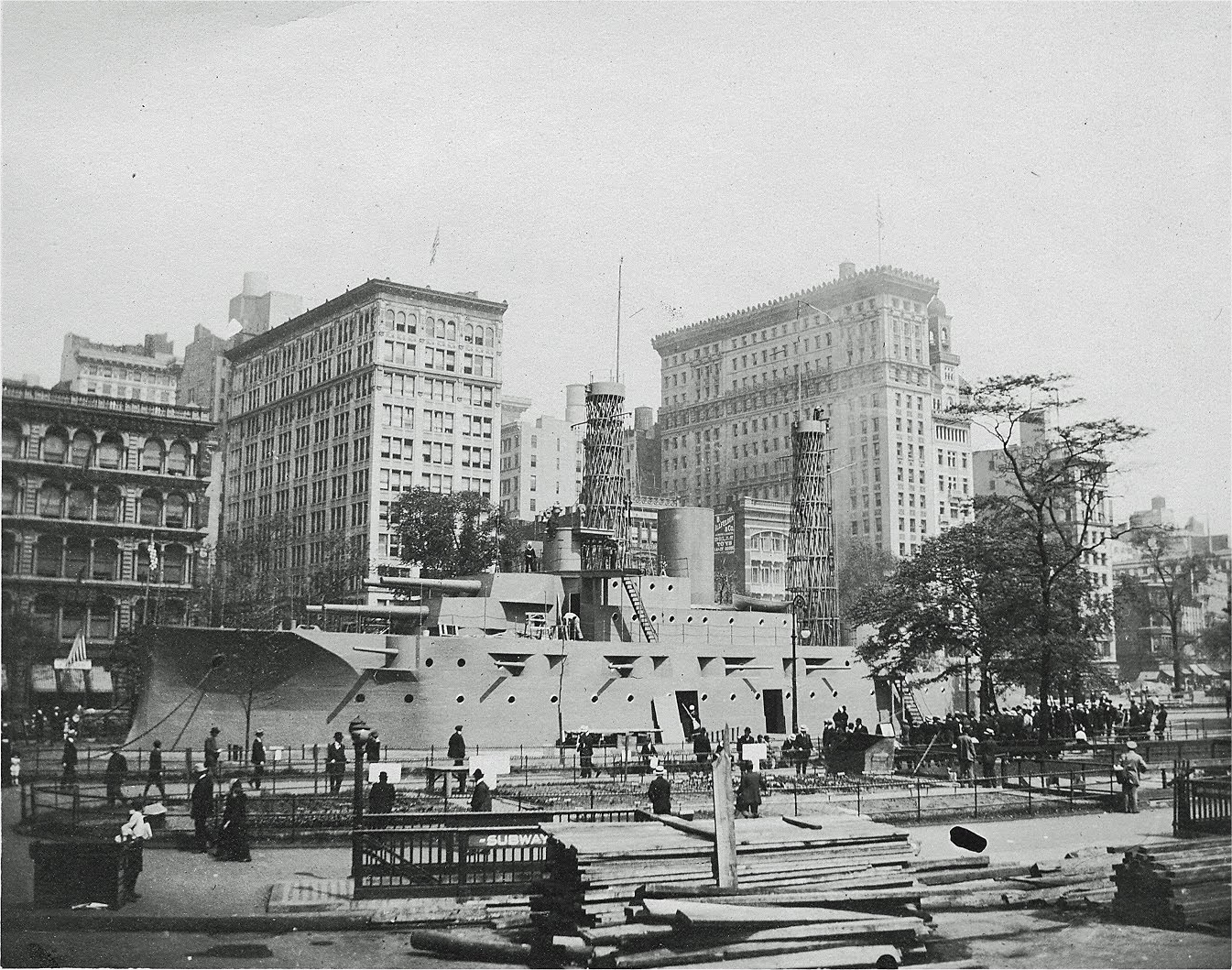
Recruit on Union Square

Following its completion and commissioning, the Landship Recruit hosted a variety of different events and receptions intended to bring civilians aboard the ship, the first of which took place on the afternoon of 8 September 1917. Some events were of a patriotic nature in keeping with the wartime spirit, including the presentation and unfurling of a recreated Betsy Ross American flag, while others were purely social events, including dances for New York's socialites.

== Fate ==
After spending over two years in Union Square, the Landship Recruit was decommissioned and dismantled, the Navy intending to move it to Coney Island's Luna Park, where it would be maintained as a recruiting depot following its success at its Union Square location; Recruit struck its colors on 16 March 1920; The New York Times reported that the "Landship" had helped the U.S. Navy recruit 25,000 men into the service—625 times the size of her own crew, and enough to crew twenty-eight Nevada-class battleships. However, the cost of a move to Coney Island proved to exceed the value of the materials used in the vessel, so following its dismantling it was never reassembled, the materials being most likely reused in local projects.

== See also ==
- Muroc Maru, another wooden landship
- USS Commodore (401B)
- USS Recruit (TDE-1)
