= Rogers Dry Lake =

Dry lake in the state of California, United States

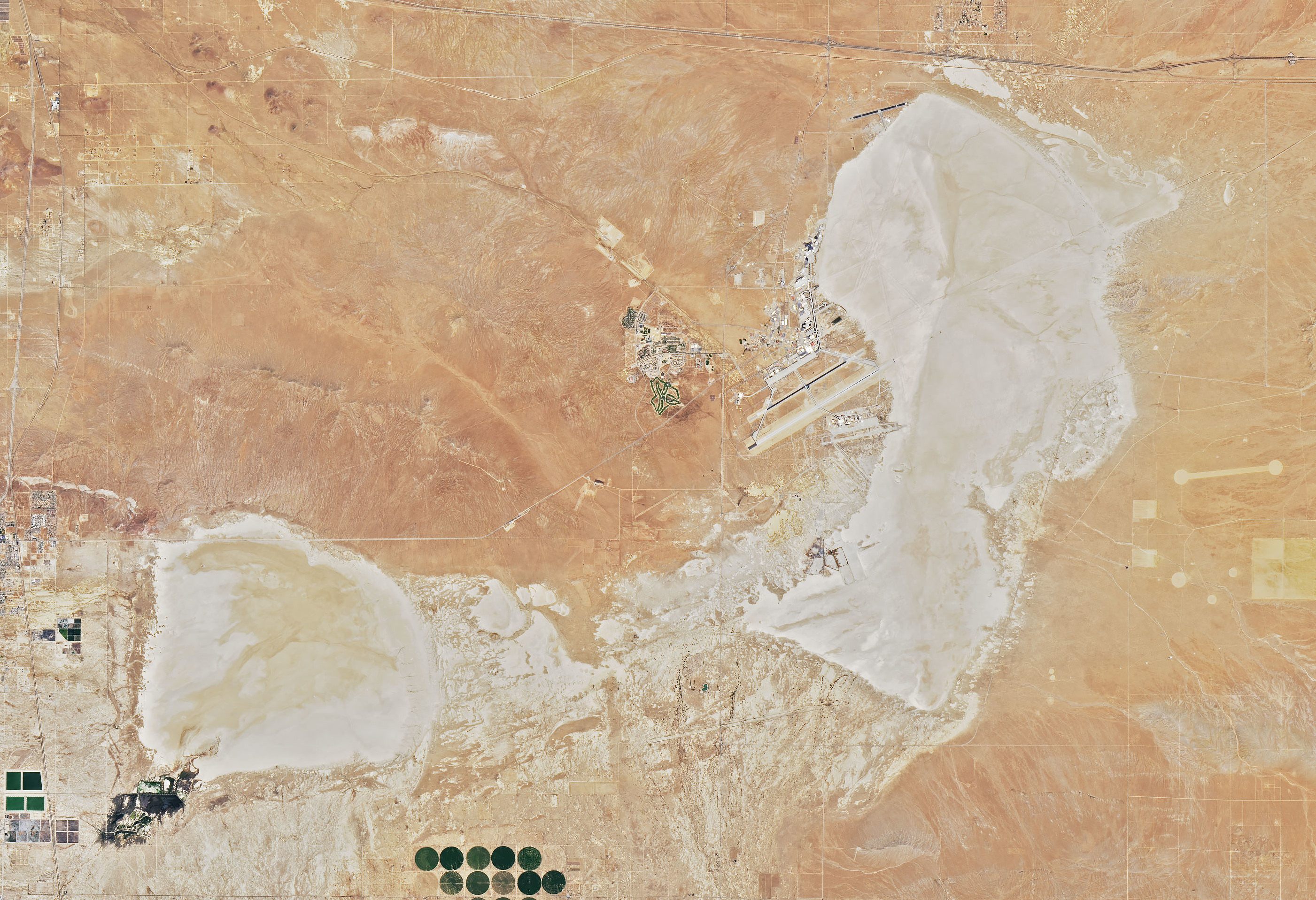
- Rogers Dry Lake (right) and Rosamond Lake (lower left) in Mojave Desert, California

- Location within California Location within the United States
- Location: Mojave Desert; Kern County, California; Los Angeles County, California
- Coordinates: 34.921944°N 117.8275°W
- Lake type: Endorheic basin
- Basin countries: United States
- Max. length: 19 km (12 mi)
- Max. width: 11 km (6.8 mi)
- Surface area: 112 km^{2} (43 sq mi)
- Shore length^{1}: 61 km (38 mi)
- Surface elevation: 694 m (2,277 ft)
- Settlements: Edwards Air Force Base
- References: U.S. Geological Survey Geographic Names Information System: Rogers Dry Lake
- Rogers Dry Lake; Edwards Air Force Base
- U.S. National Register of Historic Places
- U.S. National Historic Landmark
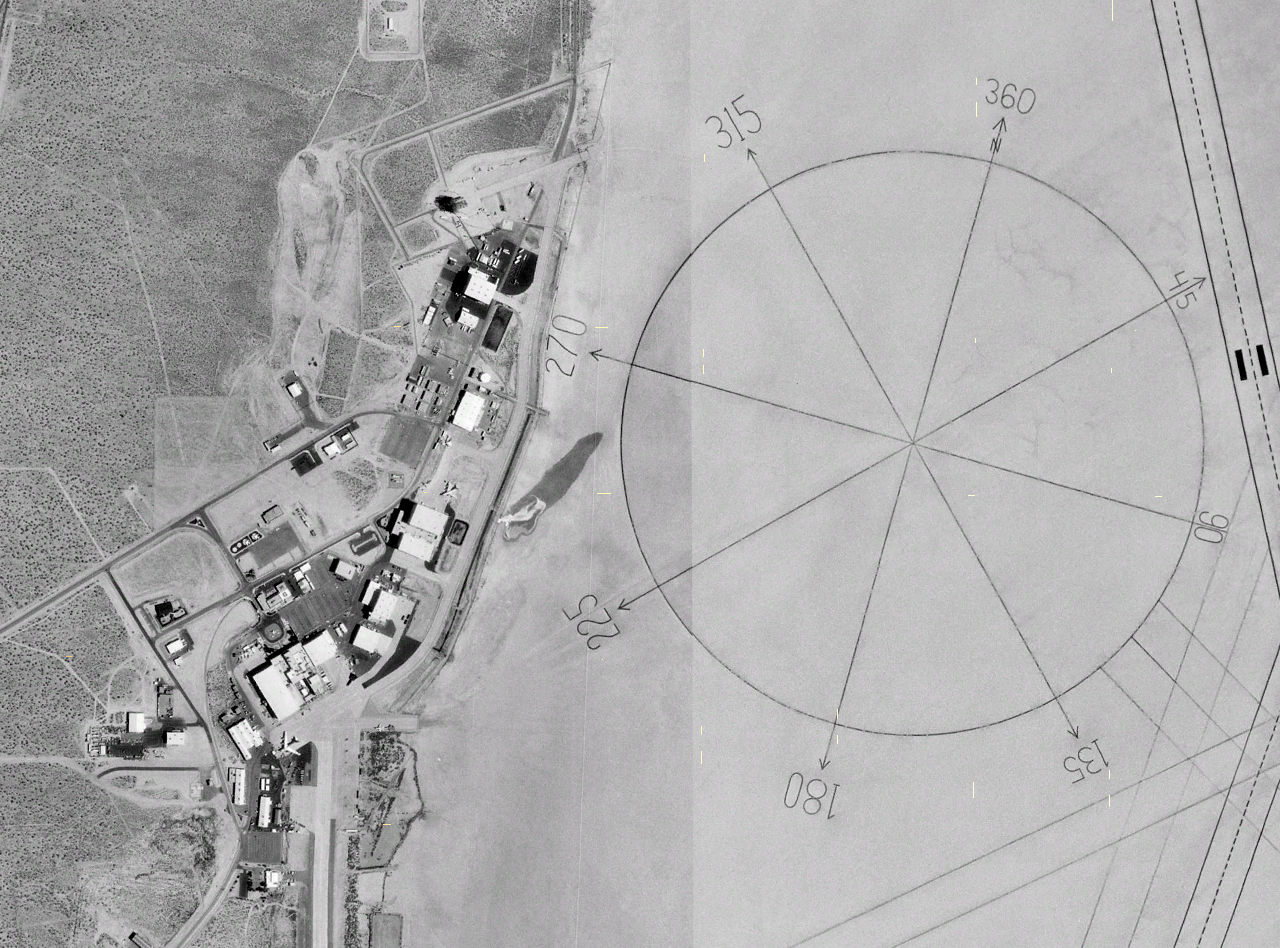
- Location: Mojave Desert; Kern County, California
- Coordinates: 34°55′19″N 117°49′39″W
- Built: 1933
- NRHP reference No.: 85002816

Significant dates
- Added to NRHP: 03 October 1985
- Designated NHL: 03 October 1985
- ^{1} Shore length is not a well-defined measure.

Rogers Dry Lake is an endorheic desert salt flat in the Mojave Desert of Kern County, California. The name is derived from the Anglicized Spanish name, Rodriguez Dry Lake. It is the central part of Edwards Air Force Base, as its hard surface provides a natural extension to the paved runways. It was formerly also known as Muroc Dry Lake.

== Geology ==
Rogers Dry Lake is located in the Antelope Valley, about 100 miles (160 km) north of Los Angeles. It covers an area of about 65 square miles (170 km^{2}) at the low point of the valley, forming a rough figure eight. It is the bed of a lake that formed roughly 2.5 million years ago, in the Pleistocene. It is 12.5 miles (20.1 km) long and 5.5 miles (8.9 km) wide at its greatest dimensions. The bed of the lake is unusually hard, capable of supporting as much as 250 pounds per square inch (1,700 kPa) without cracking. This is sufficient to allow even the heaviest aircraft to land safely.

During the extremely brief rainy season, standing water may be on the lake bed, pooling near the location of the region's lowest elevation (2,300 ft). The lake is adjacent to the smaller Rosamond Lake, which together formed one large body of water through the Holocene.

== History ==
The area of the lake bed was first used by the railroads, with a watering station for steam engines located nearby by the Atchison, Topeka and Santa Fe Railway. The Corum family settled on the lake bed in 1910; they attempted to create a small community called "Muroc" (the name reversed), which failed. In 1933, the United States Army arrived, looking to establish a bombing range in the area. The lake bed's potential use as an airfield was then realized, and in 1937 the United States Army Air Corps set up Muroc Air Field for training and testing; the airfield later became Edwards Air Force Base.

During World War II, a 650 ft (200 m) replica of a Japanese cruiser was constructed on the lake bed, nicknamed "Muroc Maru". The ship was demolished in 1950.

=== Edwards Air Force Base ===
Many of the United States' notable aeronautical achievements have taken place at Rogers Dry Lake, including the testing of experimental military aircraft, the breaking of the sound barrier by Chuck Yeager, and landings of the Space Shuttle. It is also famous for the world's largest compass rose painted onto the lake bed. It was designated a National Historic Landmark in 1985.

Its principal runway is 05/23. In addition to its paved component of 15,000 ft (4,600 m), it has an extra 9,000 ft (2,700 m) of lake bed runway and it is capable of landing all known aircraft.

The seven other official runways on the Rogers lake bed and their lengths are:

- 17/35 — 7.5 mi (12.1 km) — primary runway
- 05/23 — 5.2 mi (8.4 km)
- 06/24 — 1.4 mi (2.3 km)
- 07/25 — 4.0 mi (6.4 km)
- 09/27 — 2.0 mi (3.2 km)
- 30 — 2.0 mi (3.2 km) — extends onto the compass rose, so reciprocal runway 12 is never used.
- 15/33 — 6.2 mi (10.0 km)
- 18/36 — 4.5 mi (7.2 km)

== See also ==
- List of lakes of California
- List of National Historic Landmarks in California
