= USS Commodore (401B) =

Coordinates: 39.612445°N 76.091603°W

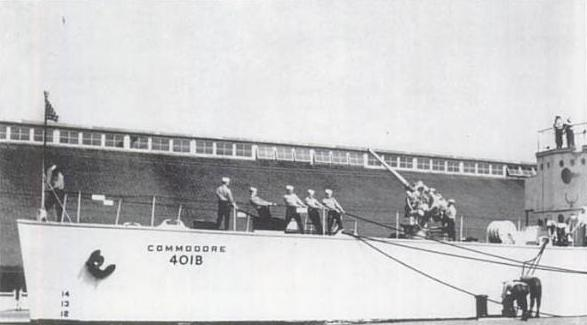

History

United States
- Name: USS Commodore (401B)
- Builder: USN

General characteristics
- Type: Training vessel
- Propulsion: none

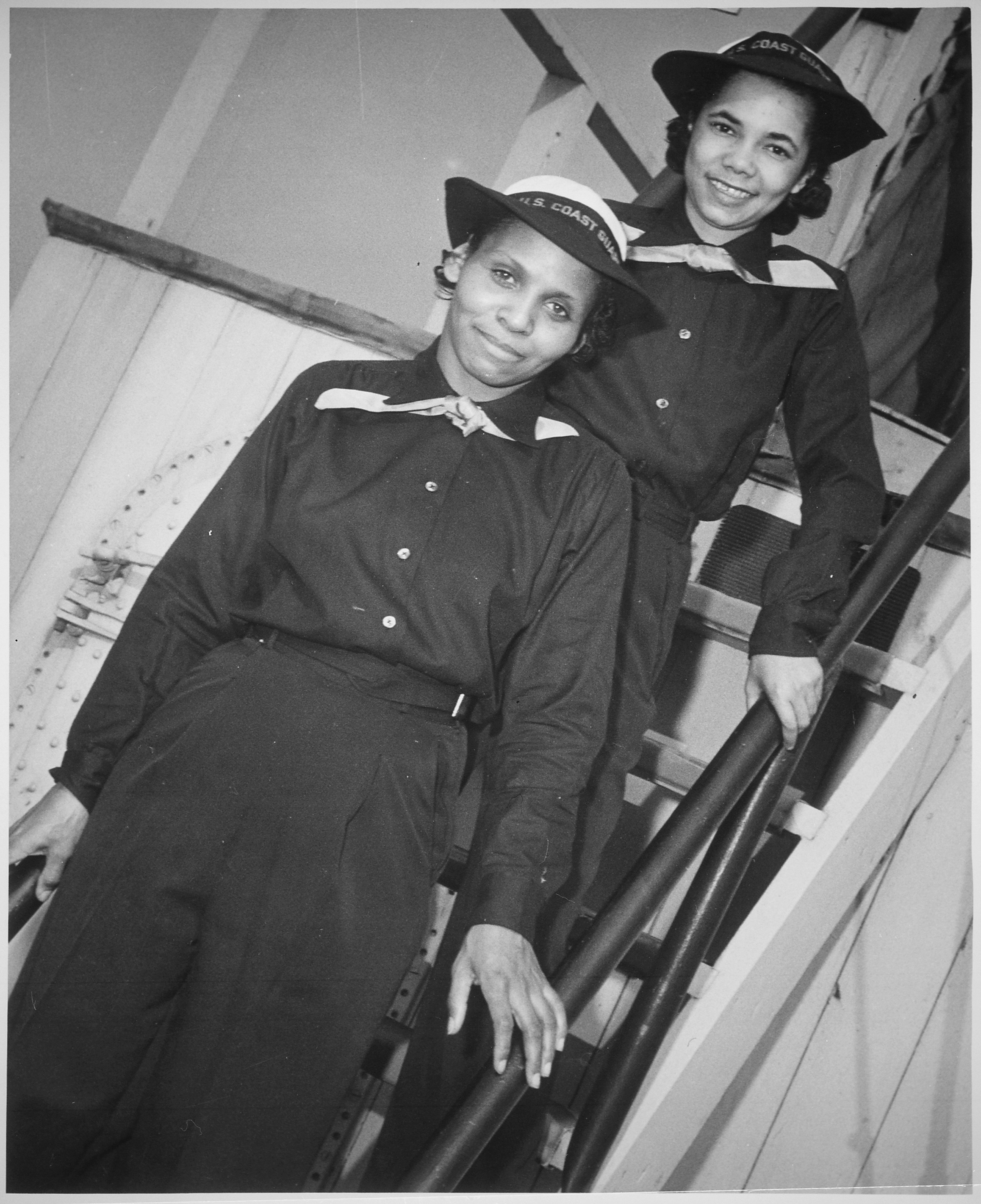
Olivia Hooker (front) and Aileen Anita Cooks (behind) of the SPARS aboard USS Commodore (401B).

USS Commodore (401B), also known as R.T.S. Commodore, was a landlocked "dummy" training ship of the United States Navy. Built to resemble a small escort ship, she was built at the United States Naval Training Center Bainbridge in Maryland. She was equipped with operational guns and equipment, except for an engine, to allow for the training of sailors in shipboard operations in a reasonably safe environment during the Second World War and the early Cold War era.

Commodore was equipped with most of the facilities found on a real ship, including deck guns, a pilot house, davits with whaleboats, and mooring lines fastened to earth-bound bollards, so that recruits could even learn the proper casting off of hawsers and other lines connecting the ship to its dock.

Her name "Commodore" referred to the namesake of the base, Commodore William Bainbridge. Due to her landlocked condition, Commodore was referred to by the cadets who trained aboard her as "The Never-Sail". (The same nickname, "USS Neversail," was also given to the landlocked training "ship" USS Recruit at Naval Training Center San Diego.)

Commodore was dismantled when the base was closed in the 1970s.
