= USS Recruit (TDE-1) =

Landlocked training ship in San Diego, California

Coordinates: 32.72847°N 117.21632°W

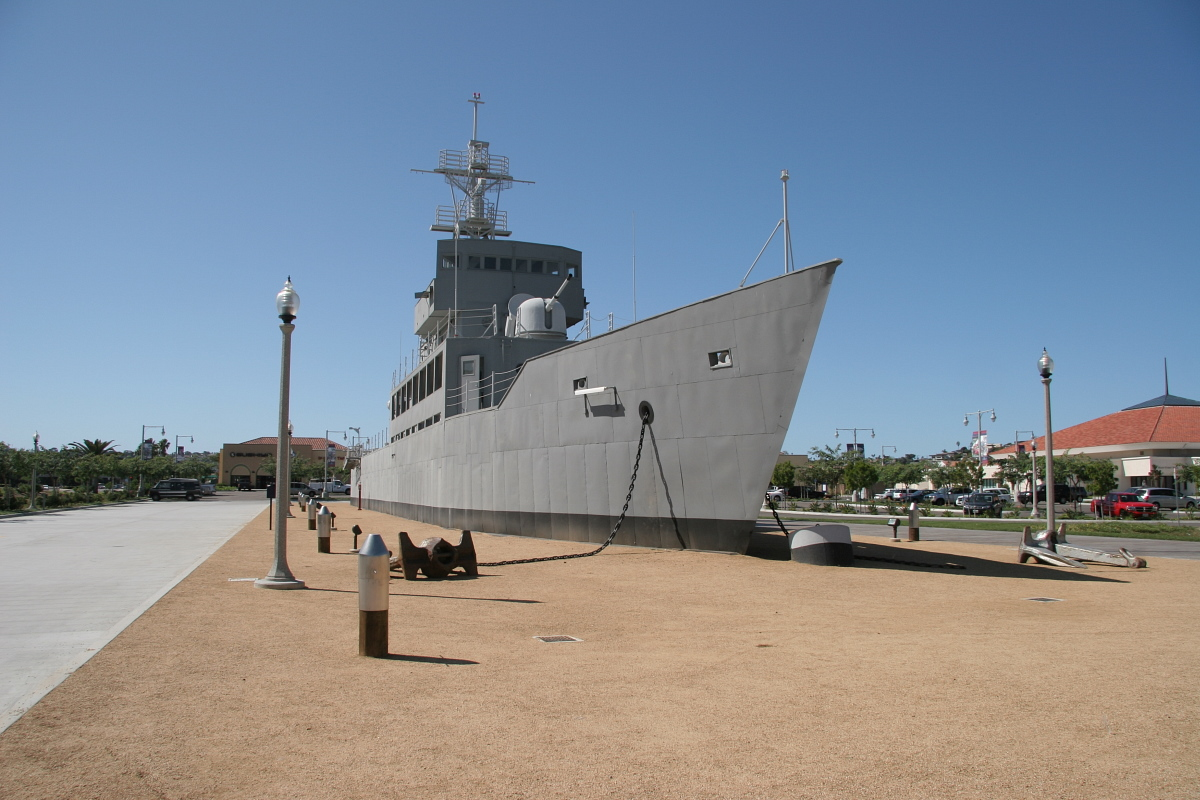
- USS Recruit (TDE-1/TFFG-1) at Liberty Station (Formerly Naval Training Center), San Diego.

History

United States
- Name: USS Recruit (TDE-1)
- Builder: USN
- Commissioned: 1949, 1982
- Decommissioned: 1967, 1997
- Nickname(s): USS Neversail
- Fate: Museum ship

General characteristics
- Length: 225 ft 0 in (68.58 m)
- Beam: 24 ft 4 in (7.42 m)
- Draft: 0 ft 0 in (0 m)
- Propulsion: none
- Speed: N/A
- Complement: N/A
- Armament: unarmed

USS Recruit (TDE-1, later TFFG-1) was a landlocked "dummy" training ship of the United States Navy, located at the Naval Training Center in the Point Loma area of San Diego, California. She was built to scale, two-thirds the size of a Dealey-class destroyer escort, and was commissioned on July 27, 1949. Recruit was commissioned for 18 years, for much of that period the only landlocked ship to hold that status in the U.S. Navy. After the closure of the Naval Training Center, she sat empty for the better part of 20 years, finally being opened to the public as a museum ship in 2023.

== Background ==
In 1919, Naval Training Station San Diego was established through the efforts of U.S. Representative William Kettner to have the navy relocate recruit training from Goat Island to San Diego. (Note: Land for the base was acquired through the efforts of Ed Fletcher.) Her predecessor USS Recruit, a wooden "battleship" built in Union Square in New York City in 1917, was dismantled in 1920. Another land-based training ship existed prior to the Recruit, the USS Electrician. During World War II, there was a minesweeper named USS Recruit (AM-285), which was in commissioned in 1943, decommissioned in 1946, and was ultimately transferred to the Mexican Navy.

== Naval Training Center San Diego ==
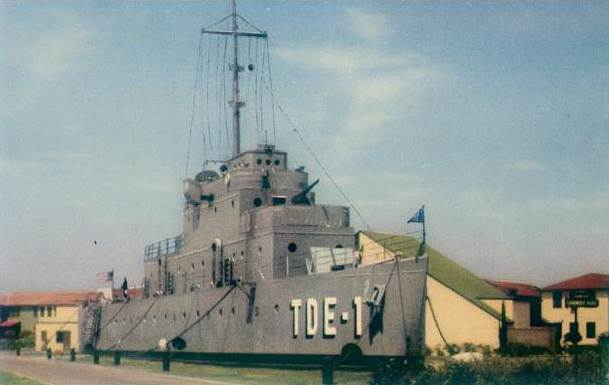
USS Recruit in her original configuration.

Designed to be a two-thirds scale replica of a destroyer escort, her construction began in 1949. That same year, the Recruit was commissioned by Rear Admiral Wilder D. Baker. "Sailing" on a sea of concrete at the Naval Training Center, she assisted with the training of over 50,000 new recruits per year, providing an education in the fundamentals of shipboard drills and procedures, using standard deck and bridge gear like that found on all naval vessels, including lifelines, accommodation ladders, signal halyards, searchlights, the engine order telegraph and the helm. Below decks, the ship had six classrooms where recruits were trained, and adjacent to the ship were barracks where those recruits would be housed when not standing watches aboard the Recruit. Also below decks was a gas chamber where recruits were exposed to a diluted form of tear gas to know first hand of its effects. Due to her landlocked status, Recruit lacked an engine or screw, and therefore was affectionately nicknamed the "USS Neversail." (Note: The same nickname, "The Neversail," was also applied to the landlocked "ship" USS Commodore at United States Naval Training Center Bainbridge in Maryland.) In 1954, she was modified from her original configuration. Reflecting her dual identity as both a ship and a building, she was also known as Building 430, located on Geary Drive between Evans and Chauncey roads.

Recruit was decommissioned in March 1967, due to the inability to classify the unique ship in a computerized registry of Navy vessels. She was later reconditioned in 1982, and refurbished to look like an Oliver Hazard Perry-class frigate; this reconditioning extended the ship's length to 233 feet (71 m). That same year, she was recommissioned. Commissioned or otherwise, she served continuously as a training facility from her construction in 1949 until the base was closed by the BRAC commission in 1997.

== Liberty Station ==
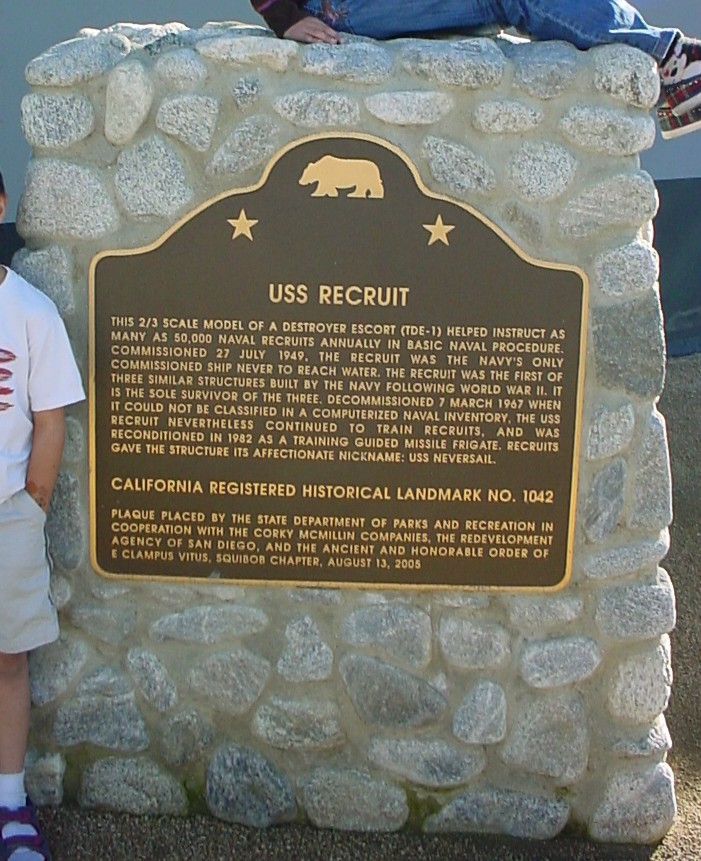
California historical landmark marker

When the base closed, the Recruit remained, with the hope that she would someday become a maritime museum. Maintenance became the responsibility for a private company placed in charge of repurposing the former training center. In July 2001, Naval Training Center was listed in the National Register of Historic Places; the Recruit is included in the Naval Training Center's listing. In 2004, she was listed as a California Historical Landmark. In 2014, partnering with the USS Midway Museum, the Recruit was refurbished. The San Diego chapter of E Clampus Vitus also assisted with the renovation. She remains where she was built; is adjacent to a retail area of Liberty Station, as the redeveloped base is known; and can be seen from North Harbor Drive. A conference building and several hotels are also located nearby.

She appears to be the one of two surviving examples of the Navy's landlocked ships, or "landships". At Recruit Training Command, Great Lakes, Illinois, there is the USS Trayer (BST-21), used for the battle stations phase of recruit training. The USS Commodore, located at the United States Naval Training Center Bainbridge in Maryland, was dismantled when the base closed in the 1970s. The USS Bluejacket, located at Naval Training Center Orlando in Florida, was also dismantled when this base closed March 31, 1995.

=== Museum ship ===
The longtime hope to make the Recruit into a museum ship finally began to bear fruit in 2018, as plans took shape to commemorate the base's hundredth anniversary in 2023. The ship was acquired by the Seligman Group, which has redeveloped and owns many historical properties such as the Watergate Office Building in Washington, D.C. The ship's history was studied, and she was refurbished inside and out. She was opened to the public in June 2023. Interior exhibits feature historical photos and recorded commentary from past service members.

== In media ==
The USS Recruit is featured in the opening credits of the 1976 television sitcom CPO Sharkey which takes place in San Diego.
