= Peter Isacksen =

American actor (born 1954)

- Born: December 11, 1954 (age 71); Fullerton, California, U.S.
- Occupation: Actor
- Years active: 1976–present

Peter Isacksen (born December 11, 1954) is an American actor. He is probably best known for his role as Seaman Pruitt in the television series C.P.O. Sharkey, which ran from 1976 until 1978. He also played the recurring roles of Mr. Brooks in The Hogan Family and L. Courtney Stubing IV in the first season of the The Love Boat, and appeared in The 1/2 Hour Comedy Hour.
