= United States Naval Training Center Bainbridge =

Former US Naval training facility in Maryland

Coordinates: 39°36′45″N 76°05′30″W

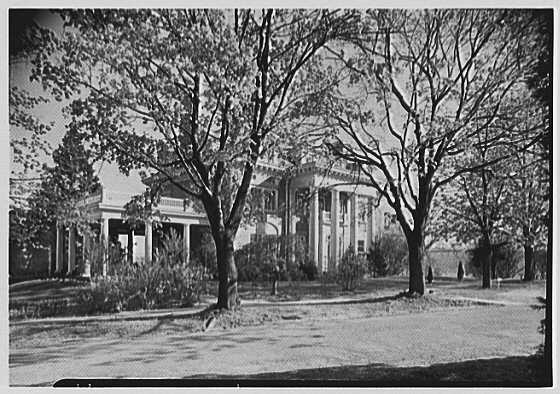
Captain Russel's House in 1943

United States Naval Training Center Bainbridge (USNTC Bainbridge) was the U.S. Navy Training Center at Port Deposit, Maryland, on the bluffs of the northeast bank of the Susquehanna River. It was active from 1942 to 1976 under the Commander of the Fifth Naval District, based in Norfolk, Virginia.

Located on the appropriated campus of the Tome School for boys, the training center sat between various important naval centers of World War II: about 35 miles (56 km) northeast of Baltimore, Maryland, and 75 miles (121 km) from Washington, D.C., and Philadelphia, Pennsylvania. It was reached via Maryland Route 222, about halfway between US 1 and US 40.

== History ==
=== Origin ===
President Franklin Delano Roosevelt personally approved the site, which was seized from the Tome School by Congressional order. Roosevelt also chose the name to honor Commodore William Bainbridge, who commanded the frigate Constitution when it defeated the British frigate HMS Java during the War of 1812.

According to the Friday, September 17, 1954, football program, "The primary purpose of the Training Center is to aid young men and women entering the Navy in making the transition from civilian to sailor. The degree to which this purpose is being fulfilled is silently being proclaimed regularly as the thousands of Bainbridge trainees step into Navy roles around the globe."

The campus was expanded by government purchase from 330 acres (130 ha) to 1,132 acres (458 ha). More than five hundred new buildings were built, some designed by Eggers & Higgins.

=== World War II ===
==== Recruit training ====
The center was activated on 1 October 1942, and the first batch of recruits arrived 10 days later to begin "boot camp" training. They came in busloads from transportation collection points at Havre de Grace and Perryville, Maryland. The recruits were given a battery of tests to determine their educational and skill levels, then trained in ordnance and gunnery, seamanship, fire fighting, physical training, and military drill.

Recruits were trained in shipboard duties aboard the R.T.S. Commodore, a 200-foot "ship" built on dry land. The trainer was equipped with deck guns, a pilot house, davits with whaleboats, and mooring lines fastened to earth-bound bollards, so that crew members could learn casting off hawsers and other lines connecting the ship to its dock.

Halfway through boot camp, recruits had a "service week", which generally included kitchen duty, peeling potatoes, mopping, picking up cigarette butts, etc. Recruits with desirable skills, such as typing, could end up on an office typewriter rather than in a kitchen. One winter, recruits were sent to shovel snow off roads to a largely rural area near Colora and Rising Sun.

By the end of World War II, the center had trained 244,277 recruits who transferred to various ships and stations throughout the world.

==== Non-recruit training ====
USNTC Bainbridge also trained new boot camp graduates and other sailors in technical and other skills. During World War II, 24,484 sailors completed various programs under the direction of the Service School Command. These included:

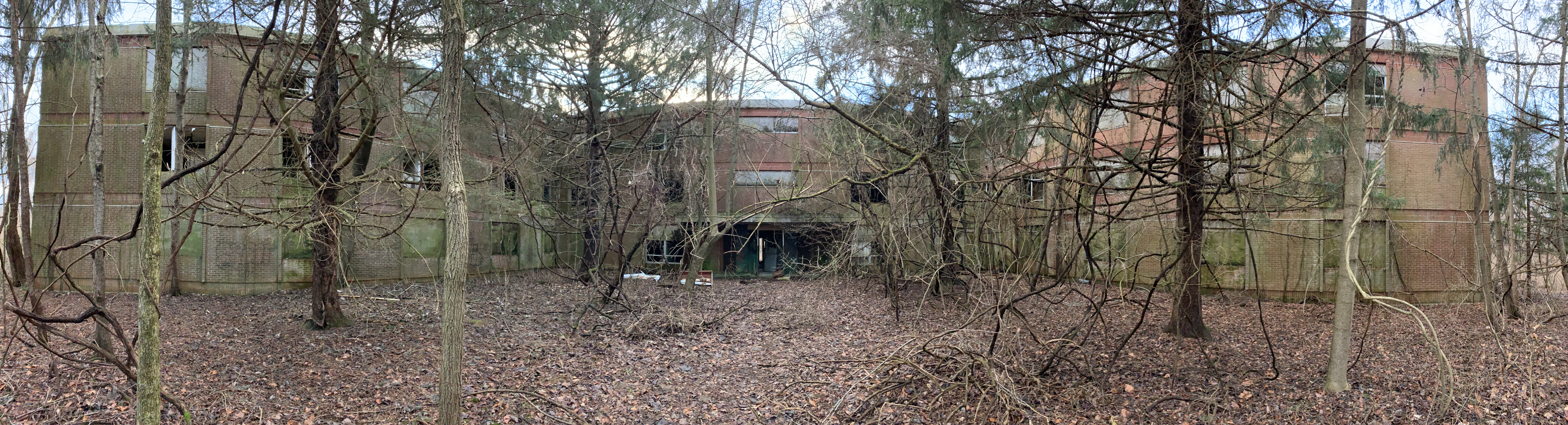
A panoramic image showing a large "H-shaped" building being overtaken by nature due to Bainbridge's abandoning

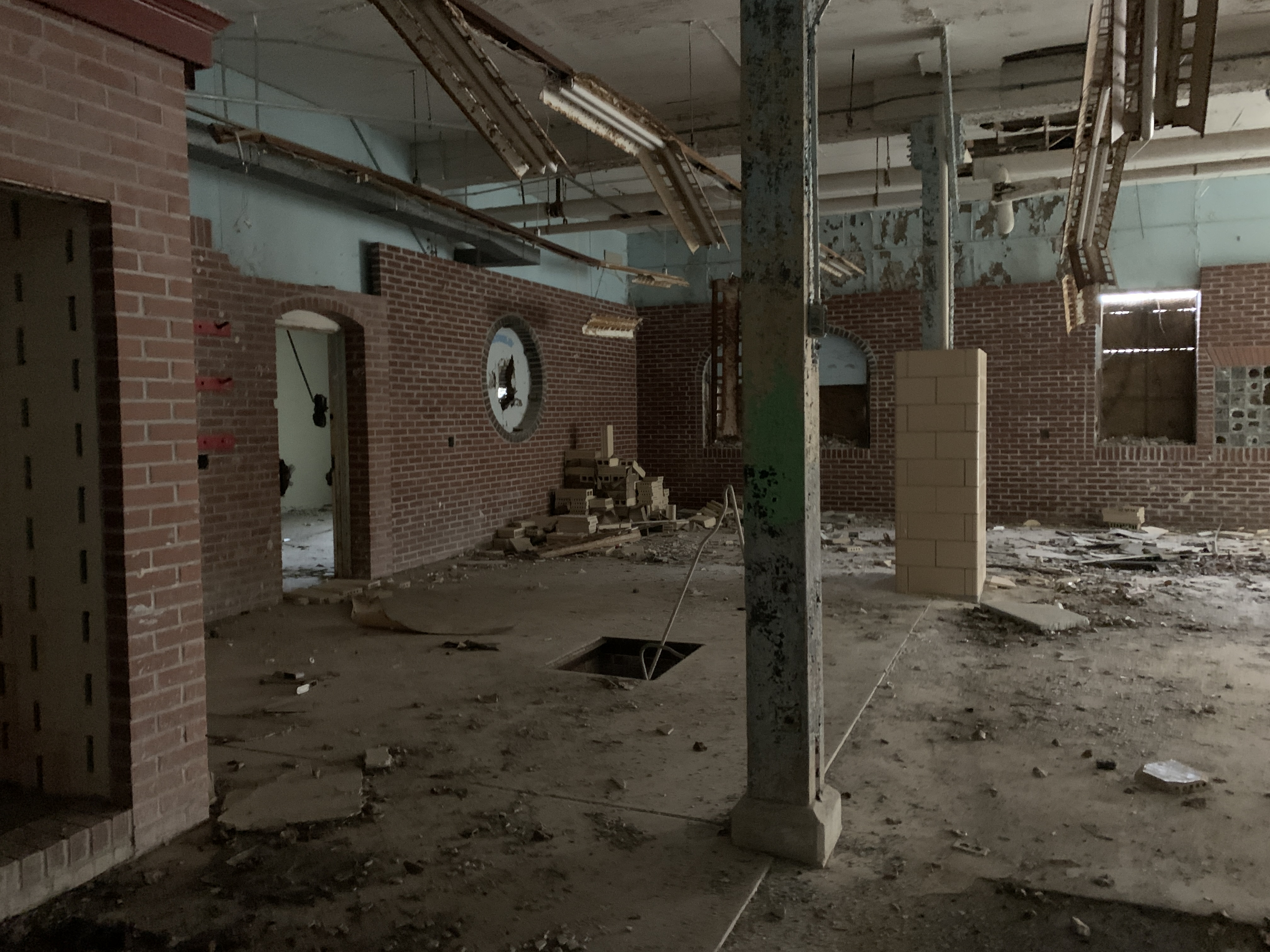
A brick-making workshop that has been left to rot

- Coast Guard School
- Rockefeller Research Unit (Report to Naval Training Station).
- Stewards Mates' School Roll
- Naval Academy Preparatory School, founded in 1943.
- Naval Hospital
- Hospital Corps School
- Naval Training School (Radio)
- Naval Training School (Fire Controlmen)
- Fire Fighters School
- Naval Training School (Electrical)
- Naval Training School (Physical Instructors)
- Naval Training School (Instructors)
- Naval Training School (Sound Motion Picture Technician)
- Fire Fighters Training Unit
- Naval Training School (Motion Picture Operators)
- Naval Training School (Recruit Instructors – C)

=== First deactivation ===
After the war, the center continued limited operations until 30 June 1947, when it was first inactivated as a Navy training center. The sole remaining training activity on campus was the Naval Academy Prep School (NAPS). A maintenance staff remained active to protect the buildings from weather and other damage.

=== Reactivation ===
In mid-1950, with the advent of the Korean War crisis, plans were made to reactivate the center, and it was officially reopened on 1 February 1951, with Captain Robert Hall Smith in command.

Despite the care of the maintenance staff, the buildings were in severe disrepair. A contract was awarded to Consolidated Engineering Company of Baltimore, Maryland. The necessary renovations and road work were accomplished ahead of schedule, and the center reopened its gates for recruits on 5 April 1951.

Initially, the center admitted 500 recruits per week, but the rate soon doubled. The first class of 500 seamen recruits graduated on 23 June 1951.

In 1962, the Naval Nuclear Power School was installed on the center. In 1976, the school was moved to Naval Training Center Orlando, Florida.

=== Second deactivation ===
The Navy deactivated the center on 31 March 1976 and on the evening of 30 June 1976, Chief Petty Officer Stephen Kowalki locked the gates for the final time. Some of the facilities were used by the Department of Labor as a Job Corps Training Center until 1990.

=== Base closing ===
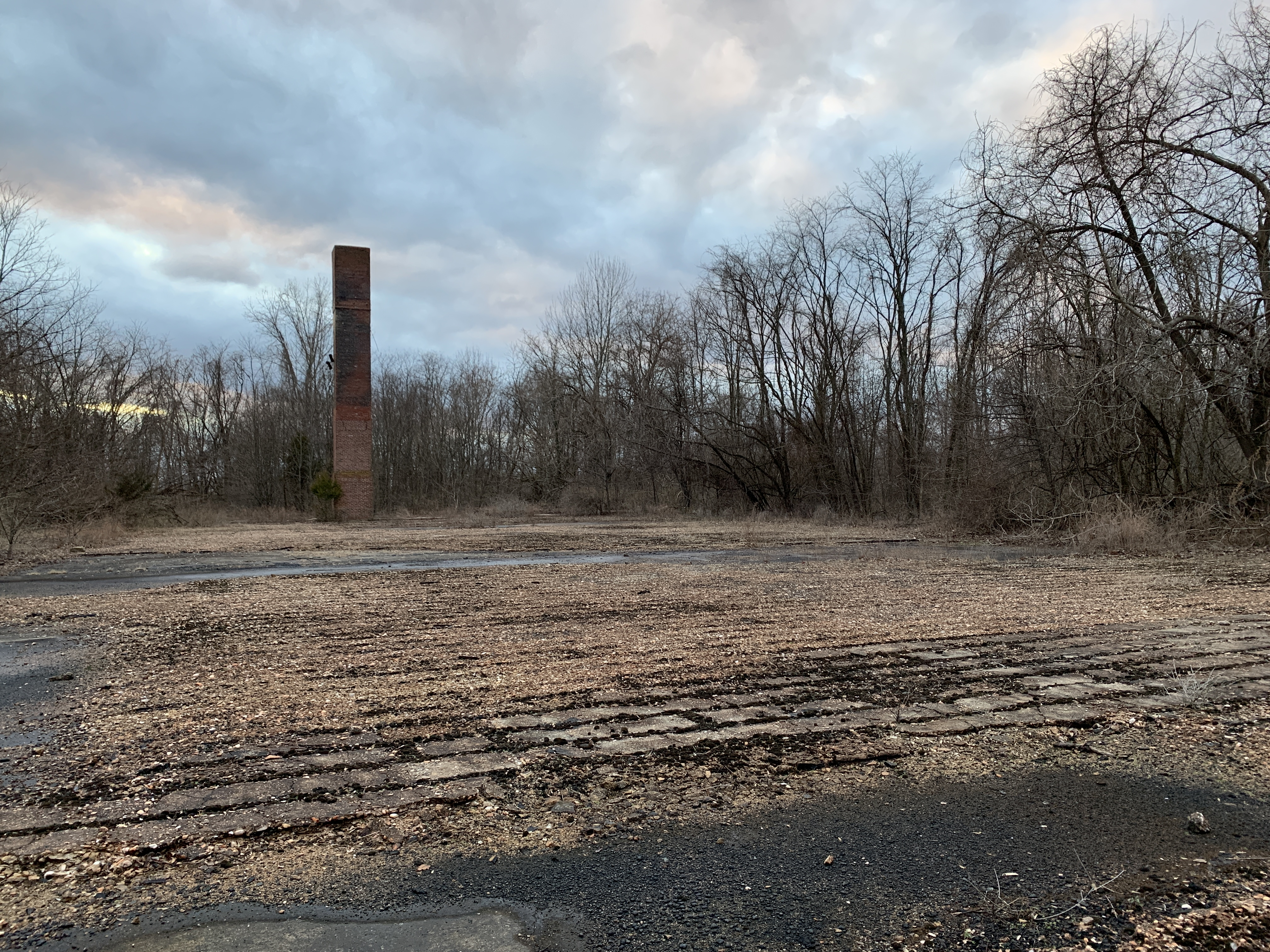
A 2020 photo shows a chimney by a demolished building's cement foundation.

On 3 November 1986, the United States Congress authorized the Secretary of the Navy to dispose of Naval Training Center Bainbridge by sale to private parties or transfer to other government agencies. NTCB is the federal facilities equivalent of a brownfield site; the Navy's primary goal was effective re-use of the former property by the State of Maryland and the people of Cecil County. Congress specified that before any sale, the Secretary of the Navy was required to "restore such property to a condition that meets all applicable Federal and State of Maryland environmental protection regulations" (Public Law 99-956).

=== 21st century ===
As of June 2006, the U.S. Navy had transferred this site to the Bainbridge Development Corporation (BDC) and declared the cleanup complete.

Various buildings have since caught fire due to arson, including, but not limited, to:

- On 21 September 2014, the main building at the Tome School on the Bainbridge Naval Base property was partially incinerated, leaving only a skeleton of the building.
- On 10 February 2019, an abandoned home on the property was incinerated.
- On 6 May 2020, a wooden/stone two-story home-style building, later identified as a former hotel or inn, was incinerated.
- On 12 June 2020, a large stone building caught fire. Crews arrived to find the roof already collapsed. The department allowed the building to incinerate completely and later ruled it a total loss.

To protect the remaining three historic Tome School buildings, a security company installed cameras in August 2020. The cameras are monitored but can also detect and communicate with intruders and automatically call police if an intruder continues to loiter.

Suggestions that the BDC crowdsource efforts to restore the buildings have been quashed because the BDC is a quasi-government owned corporation.

In 2022, construction began on a logistics and shipping hub at the Bainbridge site.

== Organization ==
The center was divided into four activities, each with its own commanding officer:

=== Administrative Command ===
The Administrative Command was responsible for the various tasks and services necessary in running a center containing about 35,000 inhabitants. Tasks included base maintenance, physical security, fire protection, logistics, material procurement, medical care, religious services, transportation, and so on.

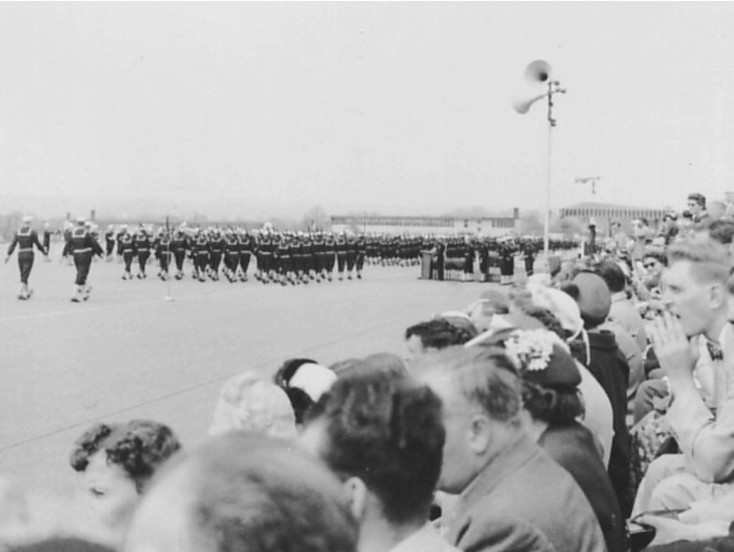
USNTC Bainbridge seaman recruits performing final graduation exercises (1954)

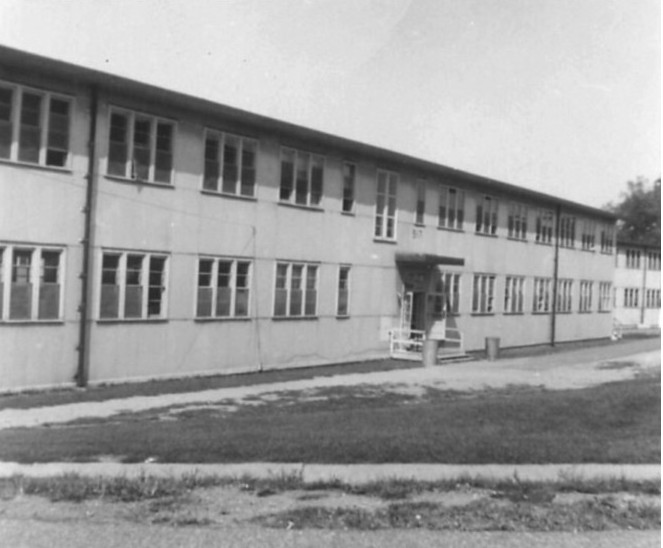
Typical barracks for enlisted personnel attending the Class "A" Radioman school (1954)

=== Recruit Training Command ===
The Recruit Training Command was the largest of the center's commands and was responsible for the basic training of recruits. It consisted of four independent commands – known as camps—each of which had its own regimental drill hall, mess hall, barracks, class rooms, and so on:

- Camp Rodgers
- Camp Perry
- Camp James
- Camp Barney

Each camp contained 5,000 male recruits. A training school was established for WAVE recruits in October 1951. Circa 1959, male recruit training at Bainbridge was closed and male recruit training was only in Great Lakes, Illinois and San Diego, California. Bainbridge was the sole recruit training center for Waves until moving to Orlando, Florida in 1972.

=== Service School Command ===
The Service School Command was organized to train selected personnel who had completed "recruit" basic training and demonstrated an aptitude for a skill during initial recruit testing. The command had a capacity of providing specialty training to 4,000 sailors at a time. These personnel were assigned to training in gunnery, fire control, radio, telemetry, and other technical subjects. The training center was also the home to the Naval Hospital Corps school.

The Naval Academy Preparatory School was a component of the Service School Command and was chartered to train enlisted personnel for acceptance into the U.S. Naval Academy at Annapolis, Maryland. The school also trained sailors and marines in necessary academic skills required for admission to colleges and universities under the Naval Reserve Officers Training Corps.

=== Naval Hospital ===
The naval hospital was established as a 500-bed hospital to care for the center's operating staff, recruits, students, and dependents, with provision to increase capacity to 1,000 beds or more. Some care was provided by the roughly 1,200 students studying to become Hospital Corpsmen at the Hospital Corps School.

== Bainbridge Commodores ==
For some years, the base fielded a football team. The 1943 team and the 1944 team played full seasons against other military service teams. Later teams played against college football teams. Notable players for Bainbridge included Al Vandeweghe and Joe Davis.

The 1954 Commodores won the East Coast Navy Championship. Coaches included head coach Herb Agocs; assistant coach BMC William Bennett, USN; Line Coach Lt. John Dazio, USN; End Coach PN3 Jack Williamson USN; and Backfield Coach SN Bill Sullivan, USN. The schedule was: 16 Sept : Eglin A.F.B. (Home); 24 Sept: University of Delaware; 30 Sept: Amphibious Force; 7 Oct: Mitchel A.F.B (Home); 14 Oct: Fort Eustis; 21 Oct: Fort Meade (Home); 29 Oct: NTC Great Lakes; 4 Nov Cape May CG (Home); 12 Nov: NAS Pensacola; and 19 Nov: Norfolk Tars (Home).

== Famous people who served at the USNTC ==
- Al Cartwright, sportswriter
- Bill Cosby, actor and comedian.
- Charlie "Choo Choo" Justice, football player at the University of North Carolina at Chapel Hill
- Admiral Frank B. Kelso II (1933–2013), who later became Chief of Naval Operations, commanded the U.S. Naval Nuclear Power School at the U.S. Naval Training Center Bainbridge from 1969 to 1971.
- Paul Pierce, who later became head football coach at Sul Ross State University and Sam Houston State University
- Thomas Pynchon, novelist

== See also ==
- Commodores football
- Naval Station Great Lakes
