= Naval Training Center San Diego =

Former US Navy base in California

Naval Training Center San Diego
- San Diego, California
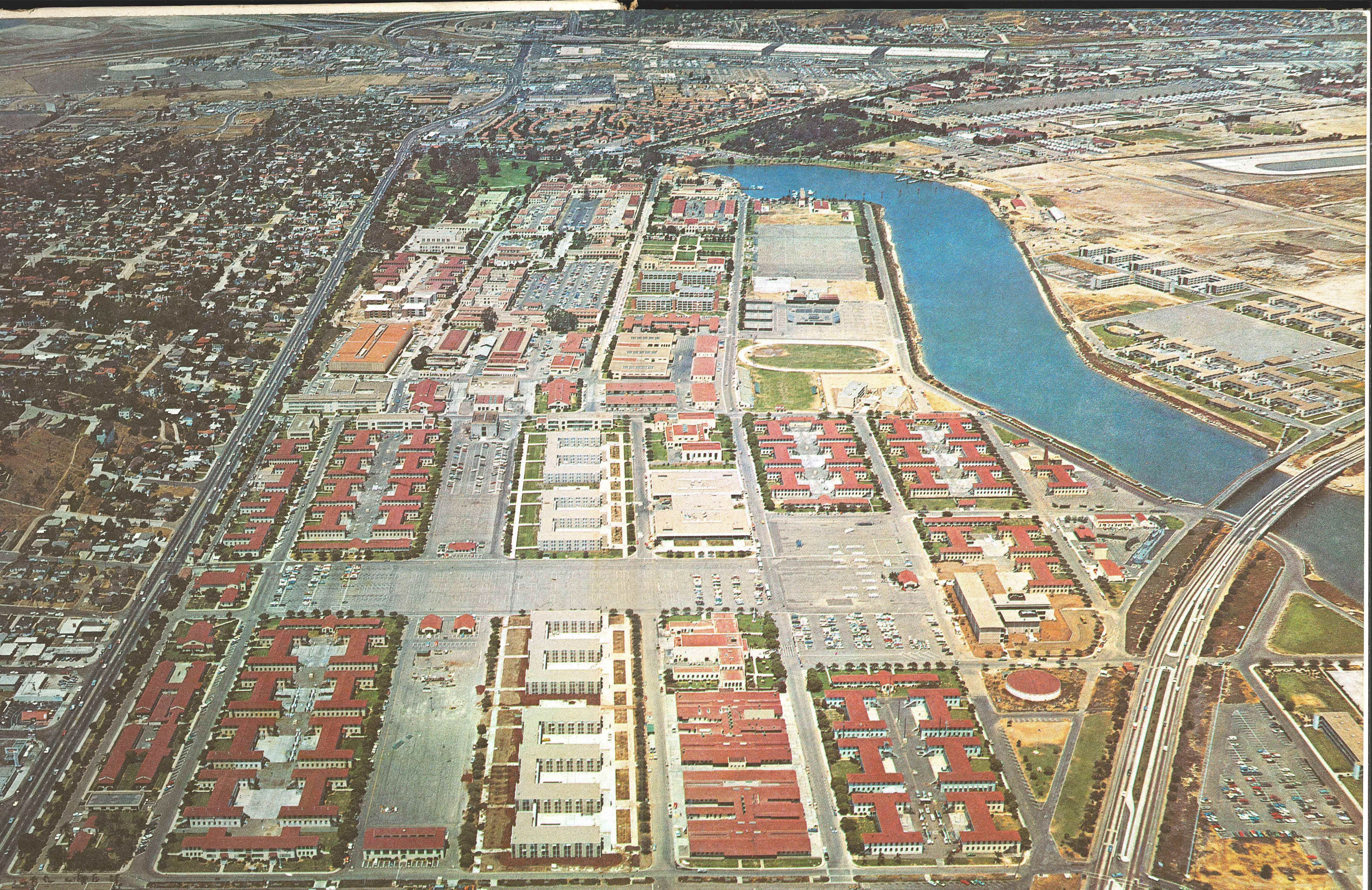
- Early 1970s view of the Naval Training Center.

Site information
- Type: Naval base
- Controlled by: United States Navy

Location
- Coordinates: 32°44′8″N 117°12′44″W

Site history
- Built: 1923
- In use: 1923–1997
- Naval Training Station
- U.S. National Register of Historic Places
- U.S. Historic district
- Location within San Diego Location within San Diego County, California Location within California Location within the United States
- Location: Barnett St. and Rosecrans Blvd., San Diego
- Coordinates: 32°44′8″N 117°12′44″W
- Area: 550 acres (220 ha)
- Built: 1922
- Architect: Naval Public Works Center; Frank Walter Stevenson
- Architectural style: Mission/Spanish Revival
- NRHP reference No.: 00000426
- Added to NRHP: July 5, 2001

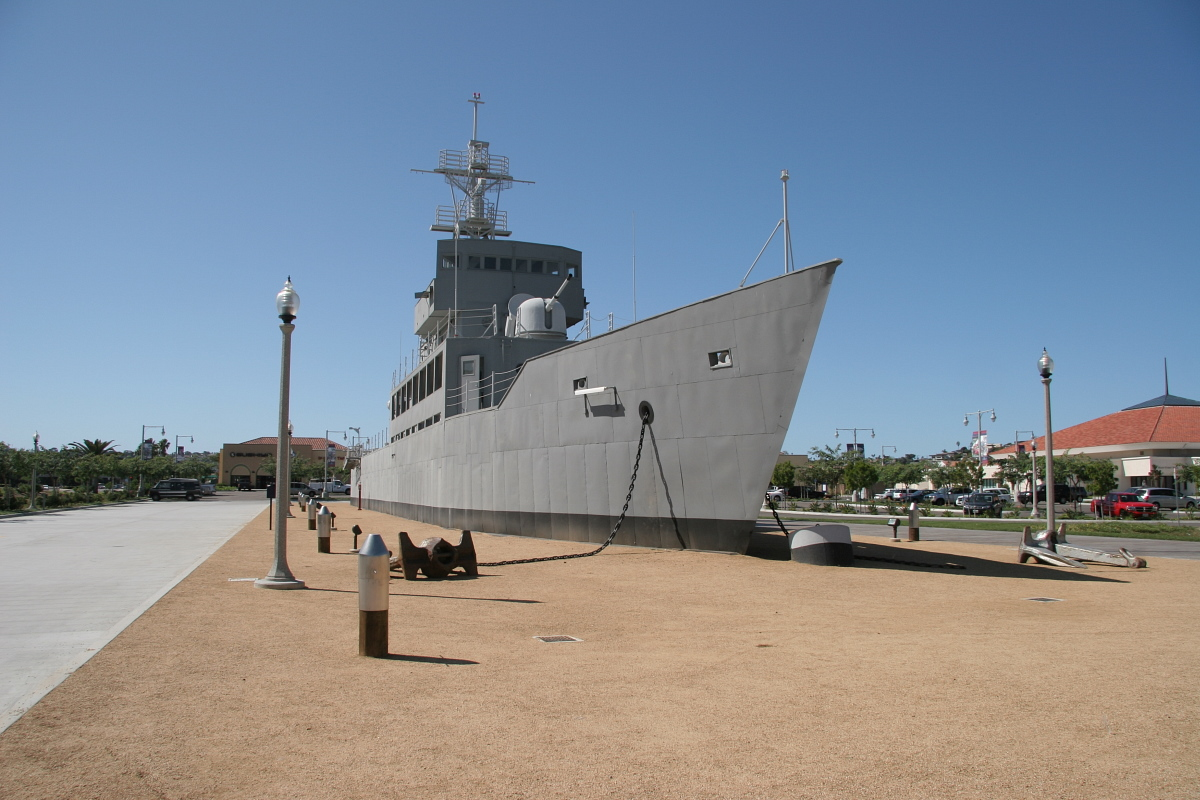
USS Recruit (TDE-1) at Liberty Station (formerly Naval Training Center), San Diego.

Naval Training Center San Diego (NTC San Diego) is a former United States Navy base located at the north end of San Diego Bay, used as a training facility, commonly known as "boot camp". The Naval Training Center site is listed on the National Register of Historic Places, and many of the individual structures are designated as historic by the City of San Diego.

The base was closed by the Base Realignment and Closure (BRAC) 1993 commission at the end of the Cold War. It is now the site of Liberty Station, a mixed-use community that was redeveloped and repurposed by the City of San Diego.

== Origins ==
In the mid-1920s, the City of San Diego hoped to strengthen its economic ties with the military, and offered the Navy more than 200 acres (81 ha) of land in Point Loma at the north end of San Diego Bay, in an effort to entice it to move the Recruit Training Station from San Francisco. Then-congressman William Kettner is credited with key leadership in the effort to establish the Naval Training Center and other Navy bases in San Diego. Congress authorized the center in 1919, construction began in 1921, and the base was commissioned in 1923. The first commandant was Capt. David F. Sellers.

== Construction and expansion ==
Throughout its 70-year history as a military base, the mission of Naval Training Center (NTC) San Diego was to provide primary, advanced, and specialized training for members of the U.S. Navy and U.S. Naval Reserve. In support of that mission, NTC expanded to include 300 buildings with nearly three million square feet of space. In designing the first buildings at the training station, architect Frank Walter Stevenson adopted the Mission Revival style. The initial buildings (now the Historic Core) were oriented along two main axes running north–south. Within a few years, harbor improvements deepened the channel and anchorages in San Diego Bay and added 130 acres (0.53 km^{2}) of filled land to the Naval Training Station, later renamed the Naval Training Center. Development of the base occurred in phases, often in direct response to national defense priorities. As a result, there was no comprehensive plan for NTC, and buildings are scattered throughout the base or exist in small clusters. The base eventually expanded to almost 550 acres (220 ha).

During World War II the base housed up to 33,000 men, of whom 25,000 were recruits. In the postwar period, the base population dropped to a low of 5,800 men; but the base reached a peak population of 40,000 during the Korean War. In 1952, funding was approved to convert six recruit barracks on board NTC into classrooms, and to expand recruit training facilities through construction of a permanent recruit camp on the undeveloped property lying to the south and east of the estuary. The six recruit classrooms went into service in 1953. Construction of the new camp, later named Camp Nimitz, was completed in 1955. This new home for recruits initially provided 16 barracks for 3,248 Sailors. There was also a galley with eight different mess hall wings big enough to accommodate 5,000 Sailors.

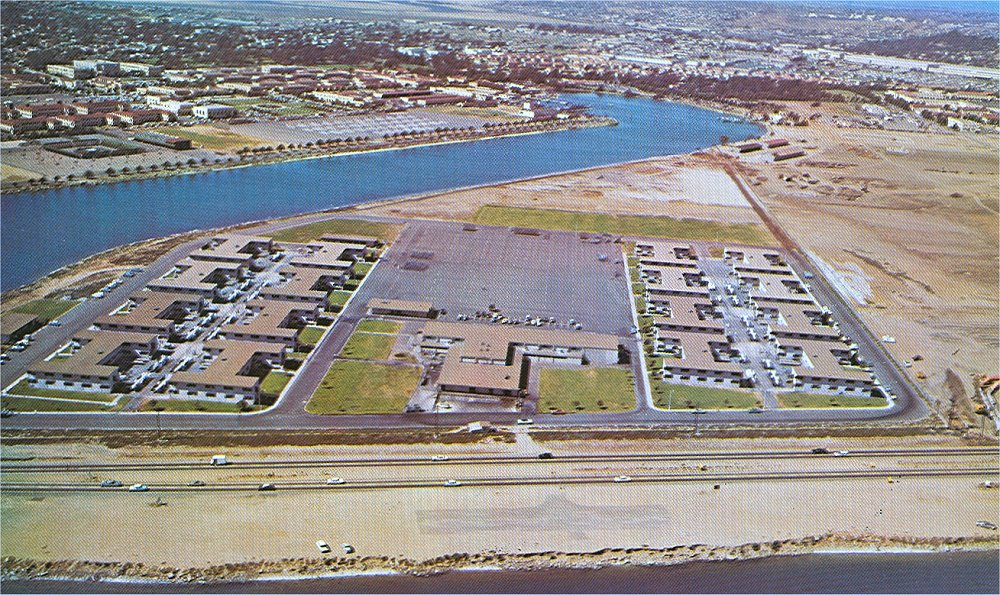
Camp Nimitz, circa 1964

In late 1965, a new demand for trained Navy personnel to man additional ships and overseas billets, called into service by the Vietnam War, surged the onboard recruit population to an excess of 18,000. Concurrently, expansion plans and projects continued with the laying of a foundation for a new 8,000-man messing facility adjacent to Bainbridge Court. Additionally, an ambitious program outlaid over five years planned extensive upgrade and construction of new classrooms for 31 apprentice class "A" and advanced schools, administrative facilities, and barracks for NTC. These upgrades were completed by 1970.

By the early 1990s, San Diego had become home to more than one-sixth of the Navy's entire fleet. San Diego had more than a dozen major military installations, accounting for nearly 20 percent of the local economy with more than 133,000 uniformed personnel and another 30,000 civilians relying on the military for their livelihood.

== Contribution to local economy ==
In annual payroll alone for both military and civilian personnel, NTC contributed almost $80 million to the San Diego economy, according to the Navy's proposed 1994 budget. Each year, more than 28,000 visitors came to graduations at NTC, and 80 percent of those visitors were from out of town, contributing almost $7 million annually to the local economy. Beyond these payroll and visitor expenditures, the Navy spent an additional $10 million for base operation support contracts.

== Unique features ==
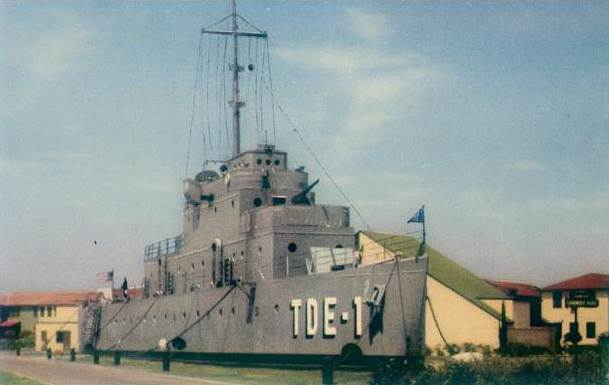
USS Recruit in its original configuration

The base still houses a "non-ship", the USS Recruit, a landlocked two-thirds model of a warship – a concrete structure built right into the ground. Built in 1949 and commissioned as a regular ship at that time, it was used to teach shipboard procedures to recruits. It was decommissioned in 1967 but continued to serve as a training facility. In 1982 it was reconfigured from a model destroyer escort to a model guided missile frigate. The Recruit, affectionately nicknamed the USS Neversail, is now unoccupied and is on the grounds of Liberty Station. It has been proposed as a maritime museum, but there is currently no definite plan for its future.

At the northern end of the base there is a 9-hole golf course, the Loma Club. Previously, it was known as the Sail Ho Golf Course. It was built in the 1920s as a recreational facility for the base. It is now privately operated and open to the public. Sam Snead managed the course as a recreation officer during his stint in the navy. An unusual feature of the golf course is an unobtrusive pair of graves between two fairways, where a former commander and his wife are buried.

== Base closure ==
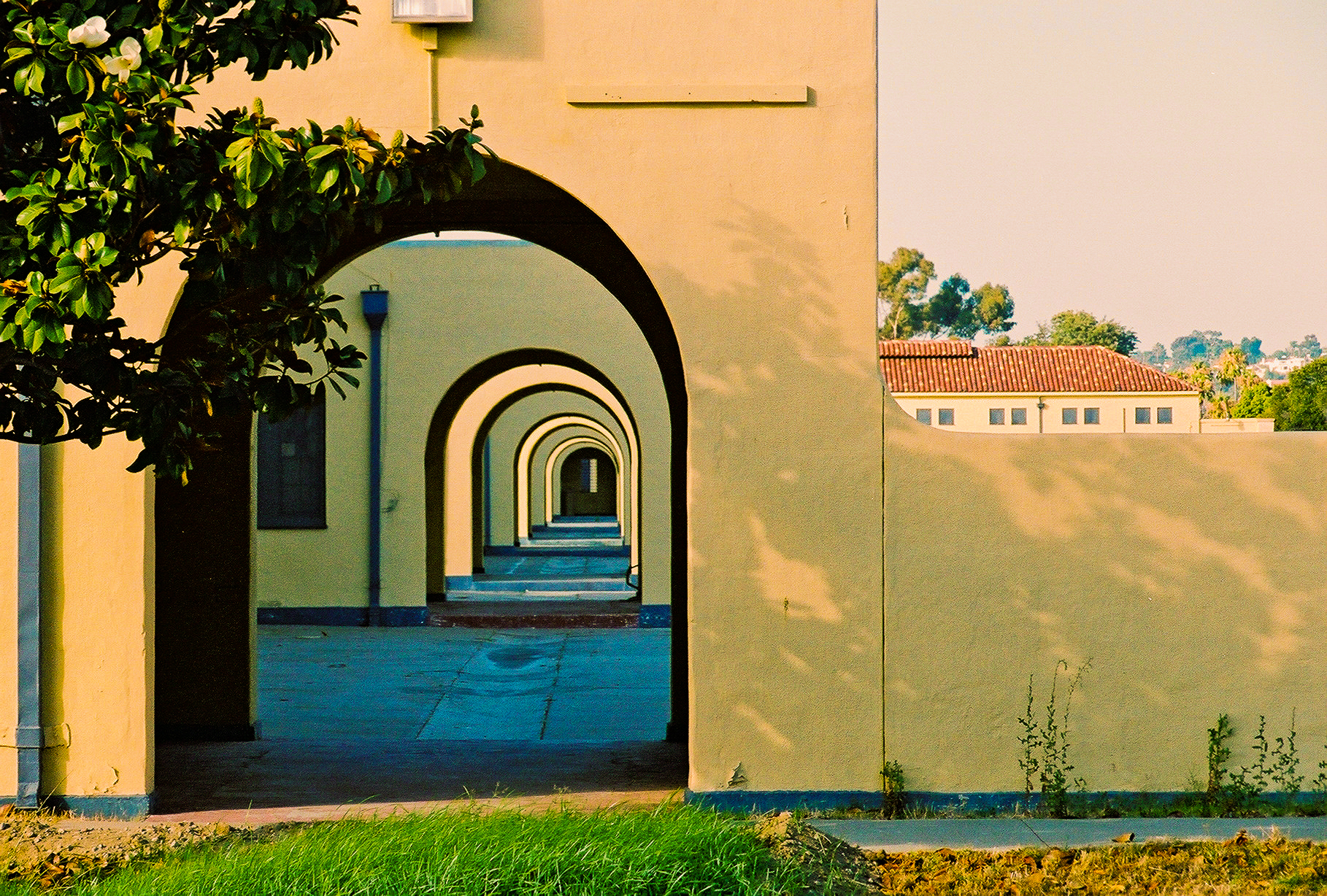
Base in 2012

The end of the Cold War led to military downsizing and the need to close surplus bases. In 1993, the federal Base Realignment and Closure Commission slated NTC for closure. Since 1994, RTC Great Lakes in Illinois has been the Navy's only basic training facility.

The Navy closed NTC facilities incrementally. As the military functions on the base dwindled, so did the Navy's budget. Fearing the lack of activity on the base would lead to security problems, the City and Navy entered into a master lease agreement in 1995 allowing the City interim use of 67 acres (27 ha) of the base site. The agreement was later amended to include more than half of the NTC property, with approximately 75 buildings occupied by interim users. These buildings were subleased from the City to various parties including film companies, nonprofit organizations, City departments and small businesses. In addition, interim leasing allowed the City to maintain the buildings and landscape areas at a higher standard of maintenance than an otherwise decreasing Navy caretaker budget could provide. The Navy officially closed NTC on April 30, 1997, and all military operations ceased.

The southernmost portion of the base was not closed but was retained by the military under the control of Naval Base Point Loma. Facilities still in military use include a medical clinic, a small Navy Exchange store and a gas station. In addition, 500 units of military housing were constructed.

== Racetrack ==
In 2000, a 1.65-mile (2.66 km) street circuit was laid out on the roads of the former Naval Training Center, hosting a Trans-Am Series race.

== In popular culture ==
The base, both before and after closure, has been the setting for several movies including Battle Cry, Here Comes the Navy, Top Gun, and the Abbott and Costello film In the Navy (a song from which, We're in the Navy Now, became the official training tune of the Naval Training Center). The television show Pensacola: Wings of Gold, although supposedly set in Pensacola, Florida, was actually filmed in the San Diego area; with the former command building at the then-closed NTC used as the set for a Marine headquarters. The opening scroll for the television sitcom C.P.O. Sharkey was filmed at the Naval Training Center.

== Gallery ==
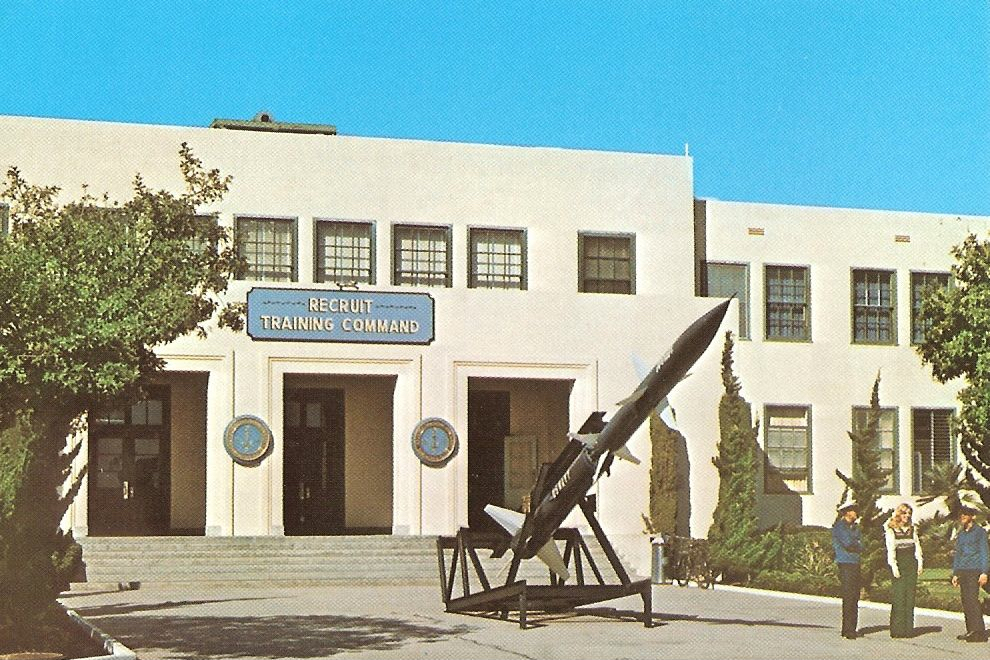
Entrance to Recruit Training Command, San Diego, 1980

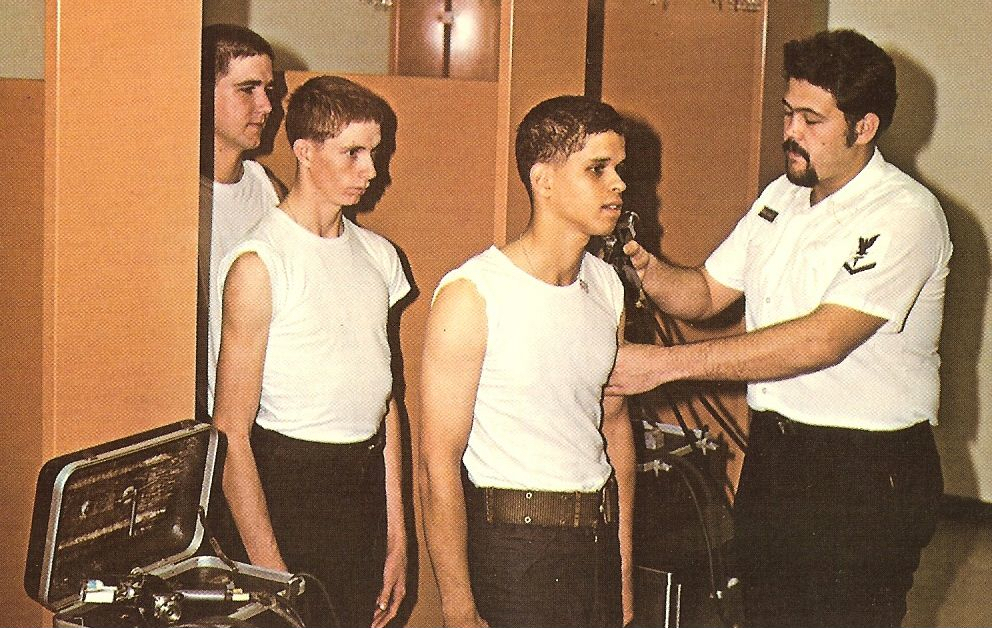
Inoculation day at boot camp, San Diego, 1980

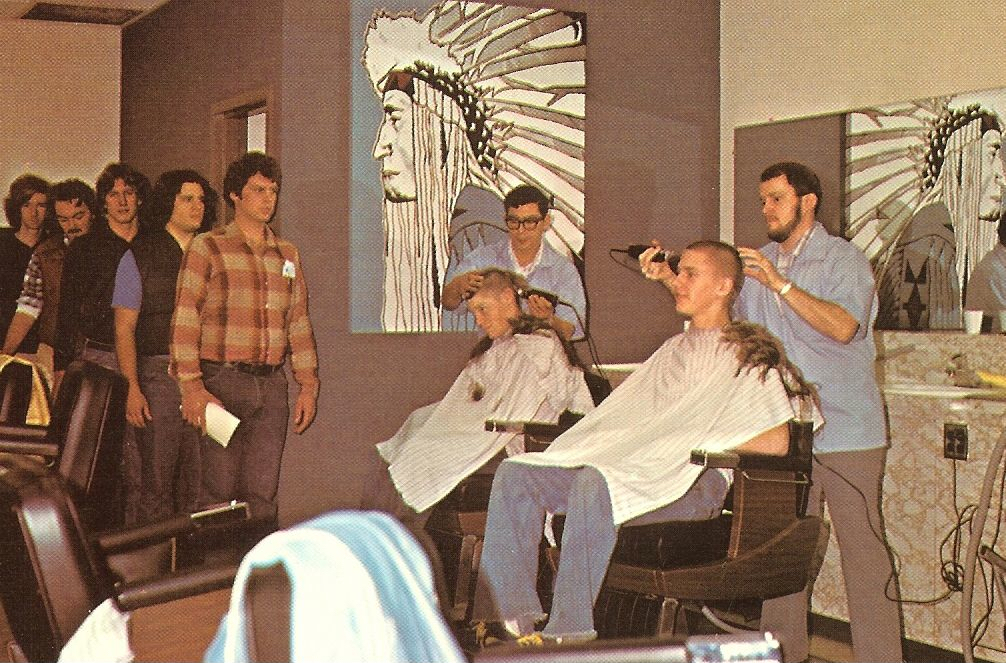
Haircuts on arrival day at boot camp, San Diego, 1980

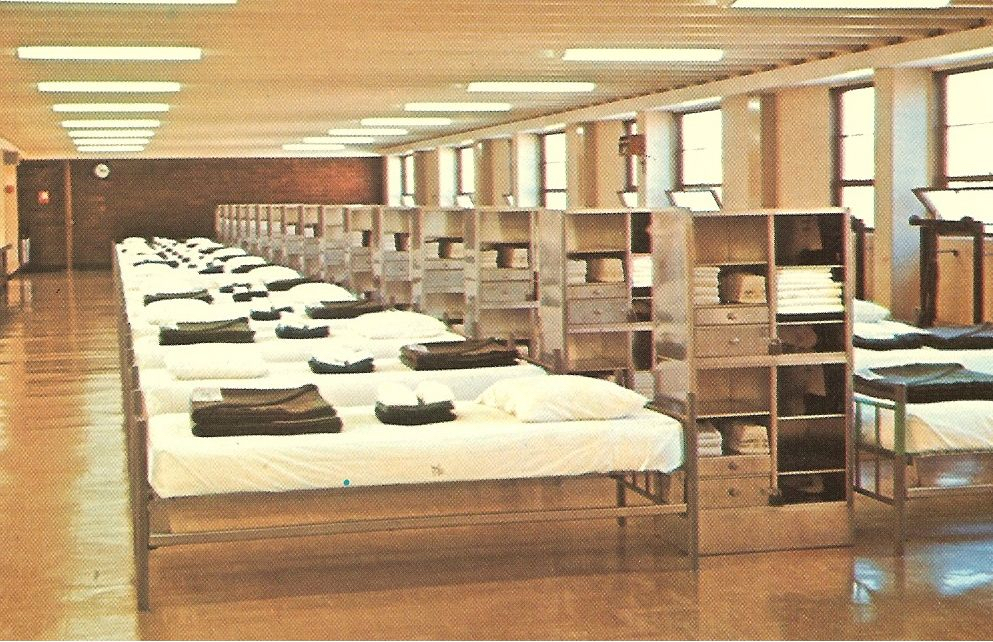
Inside boot camp barracks at San Diego, 1980

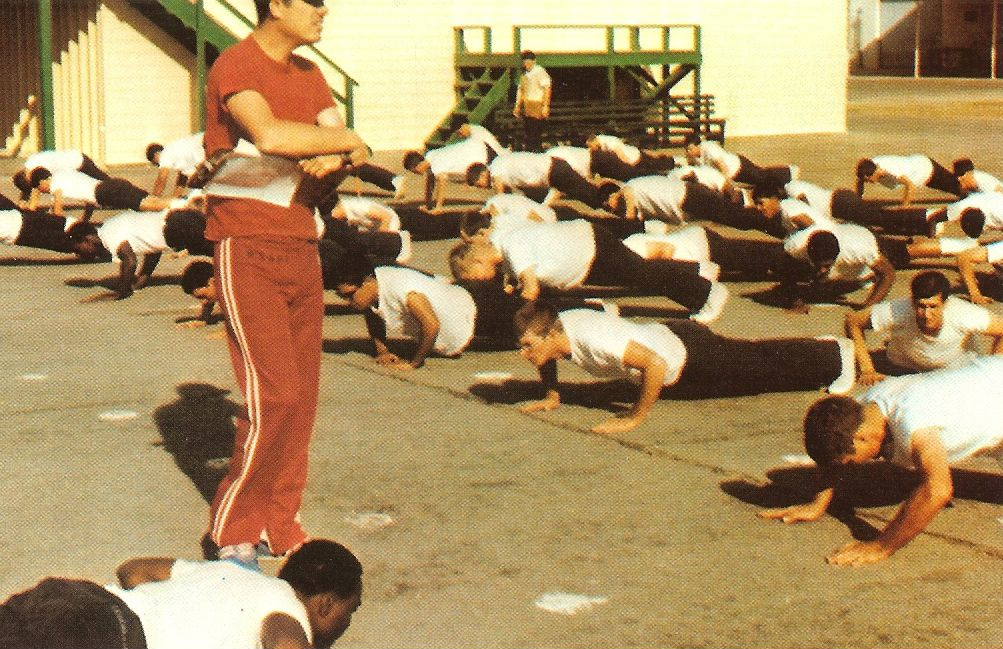
Daily physical training, boot camp, San Diego, 1980

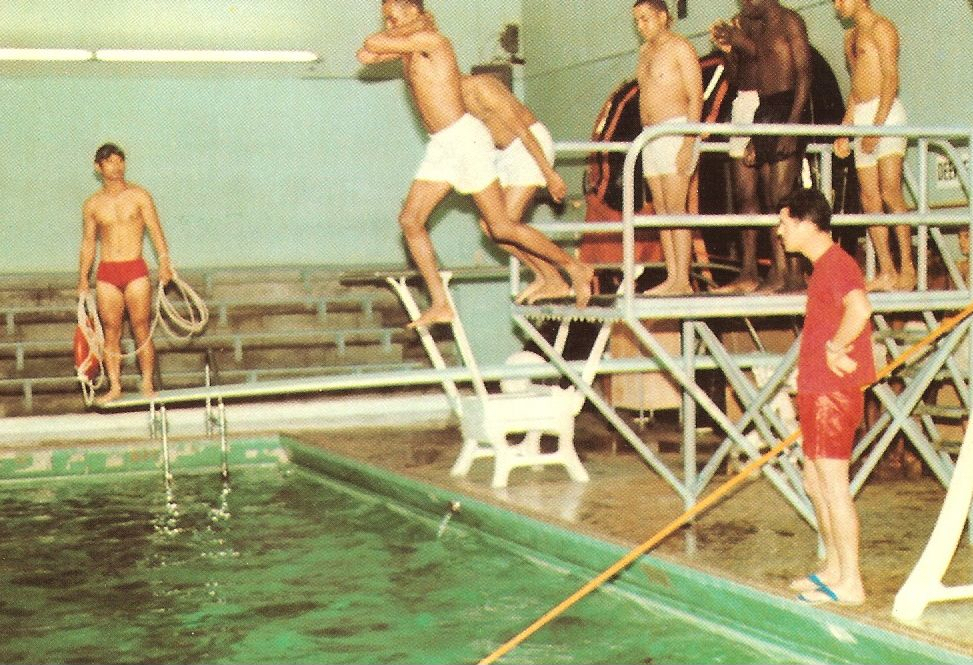
Training in the pool, boot camp, San Diego, 1980
