= Georg Olden =

Georg Olden may refer to:

- Georg Olden (actor) (born 1968), American child/teen actor
- Georg Olden (graphic designer) (1920–1975), American designer
