= Rocky Road (TV series) =

- Created by: Arthur Annecharico
- Directed by: Russ Petranto; Lee Lochhead; Norman Abbott; Dick Harwood; Franklin Melton; Mel Ferber; Bonnie Franklin
- Starring: Maylo McCaslin; Desiree Boschetti; Georg Olden; Lilly Moon; Marcianne Warman
- Country of origin: United States
- Original language: English
- No. of seasons: 3
- No. of episodes: 71

Production
- Executive producer: Arthur Annecharico
- Producers: Patricia Fass Palmer; Gene Abravaya
- Production locations: Hollywood Center Studios, Los Angeles
- Running time: 30 minutes
- Production companies: The Arthur Company; TBS Productions

Original release
- Network: Superstation WTBS
- Release: September 2, 1985 – June 26, 1987

Rocky Road is an American sitcom that was originally broadcast on the Superstation WTBS cable network from September 2, 1985 to June 26, 1987. Produced by Arthur Annecharico, the series follows three young siblings who run a beach-front ice cream parlor, and originally aired on Monday nights as part of WTBS' line-up of original "family programming", which also included Down to Earth and Safe at Home. During its three-season run, the series underwent several cast changes and starred Maylo McCaslin, Desiree Boschetti, Georg Olden, Lilly Moon, and Marcianne Warman.

== Premise ==
Main cast for season 3 of Rocky Road

The series centers on the three young Stuart siblings who live and work in a Pismo Beach boardwalk ice-cream parlor that they have inherited from their recently-deceased parents. The Stuart kids – Jessica, the 22-year-old eldest and legal guardian of her two younger siblings; Robbie, the 17-year-old middle sibling and self-appointed "idea man"; and Cindi, the 12-year-old youngest sibling – somehow find a way keep the struggling ice-cream parlor afloat with the help (and interference) of their neighbors on the beach.

Jessica struggles to keep the family together while balancing a life of her own. Robbie is a typical teenager whose "bright ideas" have a tendency to backfire. And Cindi consistently finds adventures amidst a world of eccentric adults. Suzie Quartermain, the boardwalk's young lifeguard, is a fun-loving "party girl" whose antics always keep things interesting. Sandy Bradshaw, the boardwalk's police officer, is a bumbling young rookie who often finds himself in some mix-up. Lucas Buchanan, who owns the boardwalk's bait shop, watches over the Stuart kids and reminisces about the escapades of his younger days, before eventually selling the bait shop to retired Marine officer Frank Wilson, Sr. and his teenage son Frank, Jr.

== Characters ==
- Jessica Stuart (Maylo McCaslin, season 1; Desiree Boschetti, seasons 2–3)
- Robbie Stuart (Georg Olden)
- Cindi Stuart (Lilly Moon, season 1; Marcianne Warman, seasons 2–3)
- Suzie Quartermain (Kelly Ann Conn)
- Sandy Bradshaw (Jim Menza, seasons 1–2)
- Lucas Buchanan (Lewis Arquette, seasons 1–2)
- Frank Wilson, Sr. (Fred Morsell, season 3)
- Frank Wilson, Jr. (Joey Green, season 3)

== Production ==
Rocky Road was created by Arthur Annecharico and was produced by his production company The Arthur Company for TBS. An attempt at producing sitcoms on a budget, each episode of Rocky Road was estimated to cost $100,000 to produce, approximately ¼ the cost of network sitcoms of the time. The series was videotaped at Hollywood Center Studios in Los Angeles, California and premiered in its 7:05 pm time-slot on September 2, 1985 as part of TBS's Monday night line-up of its original shows Down to Earth (airing at 6:05 pm) and Safe at Home (airing at 6:35 pm) which, at the time, were both also produced by The Arthur Company.

The theme song was penned and performed by melodic rocker Guthrie Govan.

== Episodes ==
=== Season 1 (1985) ===
No. overall	No. in season	Title	Directed by	Written by	Original release date	Prod. code
1	1	"Miss Boardwalk"	Unknown	Bruce Kane	September 2, 1985	001
2	2	"Handcuffed"	Unknown	Jim Rogers	September 9, 1985	002
3	3	"The Great American Kiss Off"	Unknown	Warren S. Murray	September 16, 1985	003
4	4	"Buried Treasure"	Unknown	Steven Long Mitchell & Craig W. Van Sickle	September 23, 1985	004
5	5	"The Formula"	Unknown	Cecile Alch & Patricia Niedzialek	September 30, 1985	005
6	6	"Knives Near the Water"	Unknown	Barry Rubinowitz	October 7, 1985	006
7	7	"Sister Was a Centerfold"	Unknown	Gordon Mitchell	October 14, 1985	007
8	8	"Spellbound"	Unknown	Michael Cassutt	October 21, 1985	008
9	9	"Curse"	Unknown	Susan Misty Stewart	October 28, 1985	009
10	10	"The Critic"	Unknown	Warren S. Murray	November 4, 1985	010
11	11	"Trading Spaces"	Unknown	Ann Elder & Toem Perew	November 11, 1985	011
12	12	"You Make Me Feel So Young"	Unknown	Jim Rogers	November 18, 1985	012
13	13	"Boardwalk Melody"	Unknown	Bruce Kane & Warren S. Murray	November 25, 1985	013

=== Season 2 (1985–86) ===
No. overall	No. in season	Title	Directed by	Written by	Original release date	Prod. code
14	1	"My Guy"	Unknown	Bruce Kane & Warren S. Murray	December 2, 1985	014
15	2	"The Creature That Ate the Boardwalk"	Unknown	Tom Sherohman	December 9, 1985	015
16	3	"Sandy, She Wrote"	Unknown	Coslough Johnson	December 16, 1985	016
17	4	"Suzie Claus Is Coming to Town"	Unknown	Dawn Aldredge & Judith Bustany	December 23, 1985	022
18	5	"B. My Love"	Unknown	Warren S. Murray	December 30, 1985	019
19	6	"The Exterminators"	Unknown	Bruce Kane & Warren S. Murray	January 6, 1986	017
20	7	"The Buck Stops Here"	Unknown	Coslough Johnson	January 13, 1986	023
21	8	"Bully for You"	Unknown	Robert Gosnell & Susan Katt	January 20, 1986	018
22	9	"Big Sister Blues"	Unknown	Shelly Landau & Jane Gould	January 27, 1986	020
23	10	"Mr. October"	Unknown	Adrienne Armstrong & Mitzi McCall	February 10, 1986	021
24	11	"Partners"	Unknown	Joe Glauberg	February 17, 1986	024
25	12	"The Big Two-three"	Unknown	Ken Steele	February 24, 1986	025
26	13	"Buchanan and Son"	Unknown	Susan Misty Stewart	March 3, 1986	026
27	14	"Tonsils"	Unknown	Roger Garrett	March 10, 1986	027
28	15	"A Robbie Production"	Unknown	Shelly Landau & Jane Gould	March 17, 1986	028
29	16	"Hurricane"	Unknown	Jim Rogers	March 24, 1986	029
30	17	"Two Tickets for Bruce"	Unknown	Shelly Landau & Jane Gould	April 7, 1986	030
31	18	"The Oddest Couple"	Russ Petranto	Robert Ulin	May 5, 1986	036
32	19	"The Wrong Mr. Right"	Russ Petranto	Len Richmond	May 12, 1986	037
33	20	"Real Men Eat Quiche"	Unknown	Shelly Landau & Jane Gould	May 19, 1986	032
34	21	"Jessica's Old Flame"	Franklin Melton	Robert Schlichting & Ronald Kweskin	May 26, 1986	034
35	22	"Bicycle Thief"	Dick Harwood	Joe Glauberg	June 2, 1986	038
36	23	"Dueling Dads"	Norman Abbott	Danny Morris & Robert Gosnell	June 3, 1986	031
37	24	"Lucas' Nephew"	Russ Petranto	Ted Bergman	June 5, 1986	035
38	25	"Big Brother Is Watching"	Bonnie Franklin	Jerry Winnick	June 6, 1986	039
39	26	"Jessica's Vacation"	Norman Abbott	Lewis Arquette	June 9, 1986	041
40	27	"Robbie's Inheritance"	Lee Lochhead	Roger Garrett	June 11, 1986	033
41	28	"Misfortune Cookie"	Unknown	Ted Bergman	June 12, 1986	042
42	29	"Jess, You Is My Mother Now"	Mel Ferber	Shelly Landau & Jane Gould	June 13, 1986	040

=== Season 3 (1986–87) ===
No. overall	No. in season	Title	Directed by	Written by	Original release date	Prod. code
43	1	"Junior High School Confidential"	Franklin Melton	Gary Donzig & Steve Peterman	September 5, 1986	048
44	2	"Fair Weather Friends"	Russ Petranto	Ted Bergman	September 12, 1986	050
45	3	"Suzie Moves In"	Unknown	Al Gordon & Tom Moore	September 19, 1986	058
46	4	"Rockin' Robbie"	Unknown	John Vorhaus	September 26, 1986	055
47	5	"Bringing Up Baby"	Unknown	Gary Donzig & Steve Peterman	October 3, 1986	044
48	6	"A Horse Is a Horse"	Russ Petranto	Wendy Graf & Lisa Stostky	October 10, 1986	049
49	7	"Fear of Flying"	Russ Petranto	Sheri Scharfer & Steve Crider	October 17, 1986	051
50	8	"Davey Jones' Locket"	Lee Lochhead	Len Richmond & Sonja Steinbeck	October 31, 1986	054
51	9	"Jessica's College Roommate"	Unknown	Larry Spencer	November 6, 1986	043
52	10	"Junk Food Junkie"	Unknown	Robert Keats	November 11, 1986	046
53	11	"Brain Bowl"	Dick Harwood	Joe Glauberg	November 12, 1986	047
54	12	"The New Lucas"	Don Barnhart	Gene Abravaya	November 19, 1986	052
55	13	"Love for Sale"	Lee Lochhead	Gary Donzig & Steve Peterman	November 20, 1986	053
56	14	"Cindi's Identity Crisis"	Unknown	Jeffrey Davis	November 24, 1986	056
57	15	"Boardwalk Blues"	Unknown	Gary Donzig & Steve Peterman	November 26, 1986	057
58	16	"Credit Crunch"	Unknown	Len Richmond	March 20, 1987	059
59	17	"Frank Wilson & Son"	Russ Petranto	Ted Bergman	March 27, 1987	060
60	18	"Why Frank Senior Can't Read"	Unknown	Jeffrey Davis	April 3, 1987	061
61	19	"Green Eyed Monster"	Unknown	Sonja Steinbeck	April 10, 1987	062
62	20	"To Go or Not to Go"	Unknown	Gary Donzig & Steve Peterman	April 17, 1987	063
63	21	"The Return of Jerry"	Unknown	Sheri Scharfer & Steve Crider	April 24, 1987	064
64	22	"Moscow on the Boardwalk"	Unknown	Gerry Renert	May 1, 1987	065
65	23	"Stuart's Folly"	Unknown	George Atkins	May 8, 1987	066
66	24	"Terms of Agreement"	Unknown	Gene Abravaya	May 15, 1987	067
67	25	"Witness for the Persecution"	Unknown	Steve Chivers & Michael Olton	May 29, 1987	069
68	26	"Drinking Buddies"	Unknown	John Vorhaus	June 5, 1987	070
69	27	"Food for Thought"	Unknown	Ron Colizzo & Laurel Delmar	June 12, 1987	071
70	28	"Bye, Bye, Jerry"	Unknown	Sheri Scharfer & Steve Crider	June 19, 1987	072
71	29	"True Colors"	Unknown	Gerry Renert	June 26, 1987	075

== Awards and nominations ==
Year	Award	Nominee	Category	Result	Ref.
1986	Young Artist Award	Georg Olden	Best Young Actor in a Cable Series or Special	Nominated	
1987	Young Artist Award	Rocky Road	Best Cable Series	Nominated	
1987	Young Artist Award	Georg Olden	Best Young Actor in a Cable Series or Special	Nominated	
1987	Young Artist Award	Devon Odessa	Best Young Actress in a Cable Series or Special	Nominated	
