= Judith Kahan =

American actress

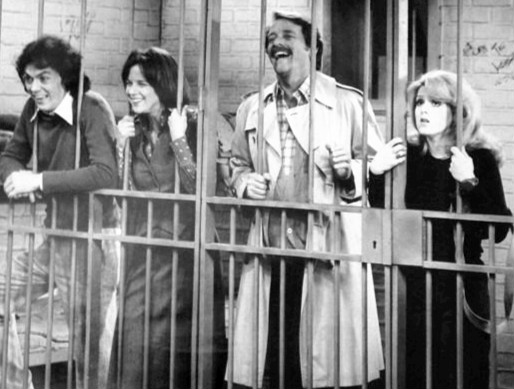
- Michael Keaton, Judith Kahan, Richard Crenna, and Bernadette Peters in TV series All's Fair (1977)
- Born: Judith Ellen Kahan; May 24, 1948 (age 78); Roslyn Heights, New York, U.S.
- Education: Boston University
- Occupations: Actress, writer
- Years active: 1973–present
- Spouse(s): Marshall Forster (m.1972-19??; dissolved) Steven Kampmann (m. 1981)
- Children: 4

Judith Ellen Kahan (born May 24, 1948) is an American retired actress and television writer.

== Early years ==
Kahan was born May 24, 1948, in Roslyn Heights, New York, an affluent area of suburban Long Island, one of three sisters born to Sidney and Ruth Kahan. She attended Boston University's School of Fine and Applied Arts.

== Career ==
Although she primarily appeared in film and television roles, she also appeared onstage in a number of theatrical productions, including a co-starring role as Fredrika Armfeldt in the original Broadway production of A Little Night Music from 1973–1974.

== Selected filmography ==
=== Actress ===
- Doc (1975–1976, TV Series) as Laurie Bogert Fenner
- All's Fair (1976–1977, TV Series) as Ginger Livingston
- Rush It (1977) as Catherine
- Free Country (1978) as Anna Bresner
- Mary (1978)
- Twice Upon a Time (1983) as The Fairy Godmother (voice) (credited as Judith Kahan Kampmann)
- Valerie's Family (1986–1987, TV Series) as Annie Steck
- Stealing Home (1988) as Laura Appleby
- Hot Shots! (1991) as Nurse
- Ferris Bueller (1990–1991, TV Series) as Grace
- Hot Shots! Part Deux (1993) as Veiled Woman
- Multiplicity (1996) as Franny
- Analyze This (1999) as Elaine Felton
- BuzzKill (2010) as Jill (final film role)

=== Writer ===
- Providence
- Moonlighting
- The Days and Nights of Molly Dodd
- St. Elsewhere
- SCTV Channel
- How to Eat Like a Child
- Love, Natalie
- Mary
