= Safe at Home (TV series) =

American television series

- Genre: Comedy
- Written by: George Beckerman; Barbara Berkowitz; Robert Gosnell; Danny Morris
- Directed by: Bernard F. Basley; Mark Corff
- Country of origin: United States
- Original language: English
- No. of episodes: 96

Production
- Executive producer: Arthur Annecharico
- Producer: Arthur Epstein
- Production company: The Arthur Company

Original release
- Network: Superstation WTBS
- Release: March 18, 1985 – 1987

Safe at Home is an American sitcom created for and aired on TBS, then known as "Superstation WTBS". The series premiered on March 18, 1985, and was produced by The Arthur Company, which also produced TBS' two other original comedies of the time, Down to Earth and Rocky Road.

== Plot ==
Season 3 main cast of Safe at Home (Front row, l–r) Katherine Britton, Richard Steven Horvitz, Brenda Klemme. (Back row, l–r) Vic Dunlop, Gary Hudson, Jeanna Michaels and Michael J. Cutt.

Initially, the show focused on Caroline Ford, a young woman who moves away from her mom and dad to join her older brother in Chicago. Martha Nix originally played Caroline for season 1 and was replaced by Katherine Britton. Her brother Dan Ford, played by Michael J Cutt, worked as a sports anchor for a news broadcast along with his on-air sidekick, Tatum McCoy (played by Jeanna Michaels). In later episodes, they developed a relationship and eventually married. In fact, the series began focusing more on their relationship.

Michael J. Cutt originally did not get top billing in the series credits; however, when they replaced the character of Caroline, he became the star of the show. Other cast changes were made throughout the series run. Besides changing the lead actress in the series after the first season, Gary Hudson originally played Dan's friend Roger. He left the series shortly after and was replaced by Vic Dunlop, who played Dokey in season 2. Vic Dunlop left the following season and although both the characters of Dokey and Roger were mentioned from time to time, they were never seen again.

Richard Steven Horvitz played Gary, who was the nephew of the station's owner where the newscast took place. He worked for the newscast. He left midway through the final season. James Coburn was added to the cast during the final season as Caroline's love interest.

One other notable cast member was Brenda Lynn Klemme, who played Amy, the ditzy best friend of Caroline.
