= Sylvia Olden Lee =

American vocal musician (1917–2004)

Background information
- Born: June 29, 1917; Meridian, Mississippi, U.S.
- Died: April 10, 2004 (aged 86) Philadelphia, Pennsylvania, U.S.
- Genres: European Classical Music, Negro Spirituals
- Occupations: Vocal coach, accompanist
- Formerly of: Metropolitan Opera

Sylvia Olden Lee (June 29, 1917 – April 10, 2004) was an American vocal coach and accompanist. She was the first African-American to be employed by the Metropolitan Opera. Her fields of expertise were European classical music and Negro spirituals.

== Biography ==
Lee was born in Meridian, Mississippi. Her father, James Clarence Olden, was a member of the Fisk Quartet, which included Roland Hayes. She studied piano and organ at Howard University and Oberlin Conservatory.

Among the highlights of her career:

- She was invited to play at the White House for the inauguration of Franklin Delano Roosevelt (1933).
- In 1942, she toured with Paul Robeson.
- In 1954, after being hired as vocal coach for the Metropolitan Opera, she was the impetus for the historic invitation to African-American contralto Marian Anderson to perform in Giuseppe Verdi's Un Ballo in Maschera.
- In 1956, she began studies with famed German baritone Gerhard Huesch.

Lee taught at a number of universities, including the Curtis Institute of Music. She is well known as a masterclass teacher.

She was the vocal coach for Kathleen Battle.

Lee's brother was the prominent African-American graphic designer Georg Olden. In 2017, Lee was commemorated in a concert at Carnegie Hall, sponsored by the Foundation for the Revival of Classical Culture.

Sylvia Olden Lee died on April 10, 2004 due to pancreatic cancer.
