= All's Fair (1976 TV series) =

American television series 1976-1977

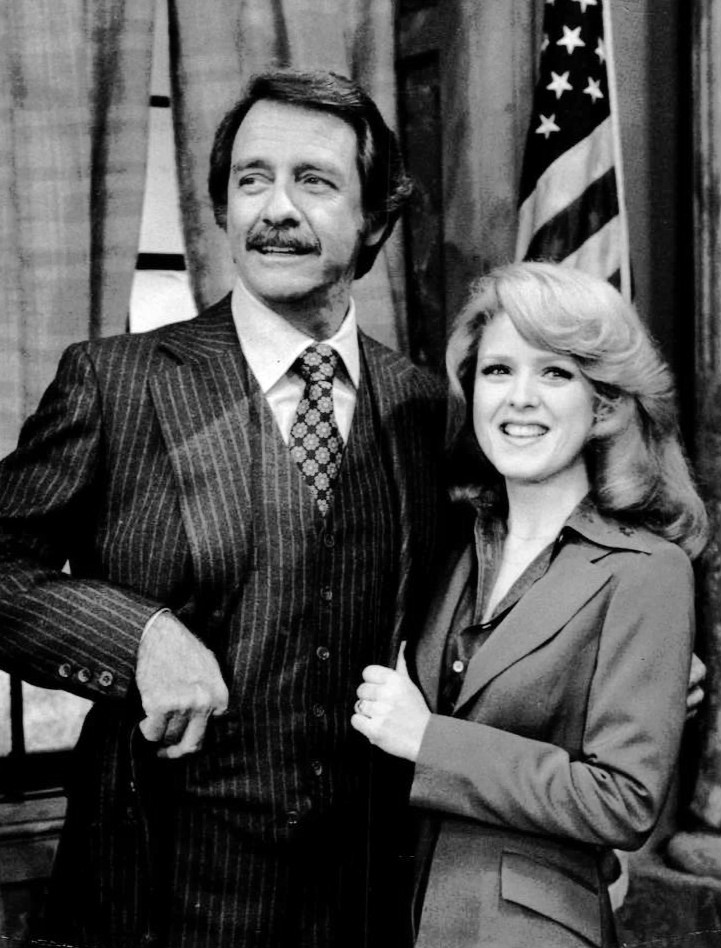
- Crenna and Peters
- Created by: Bob Schiller; Bob Weiskopf; Rod Parker
- Developed by: Norman Lear
- Starring: Richard Crenna; Bernadette Peters; Michael Keaton
- Country of origin: United States
- Original language: English
- No. of seasons: 1
- No. of episodes: 24

Production
- Production locations: Metromedia Square, Los Angeles, California
- Running time: 30 minutes
- Production company: T.A.T. Communications Company

Original release
- Network: CBS
- Release: September 20, 1976 – May 30, 1977

All's Fair is an American television sitcom from Norman Lear that aired one season on CBS from 1976 to 1977. The series co-starred Richard Crenna as a conservative political columnist and Bernadette Peters as a liberal photographer, and their romantic mismatch because of age and political opinions. The program also featured Michael Keaton in an early role as Lanny Wolf. Peters was nominated for a Golden Globe Award for her role.

== Plot ==
In Washington, D.C., an older (49) conservative columnist Richard C. Barrington (Richard Crenna) and a young (23) liberal photographer Charlotte (Charley) Drake (Bernadette Peters) become romantically involved. The complications of their politics and the age difference provide the story lines. They are "separated by politics, generation gap, manners and living styles".

Barrington is a gourmet cook who lives in a luxurious Washington townhouse, and Drake is a vegetarian. Barrington has a girl friend, a literary agent (Salome Jens), when he first meets Drake. The style of the show is "almost constant hysteria, the rapid pacing set to the sounds of argumentative shouting."

== Cast and crew ==
Cast

Source: Nostalgia Central

- Richard C. Barrington – Richard Crenna
- Charlotte (Charley) Drake – Bernadette Peters
- Lucy Daniels, Al's girlfriend and a reporter – Lee Chamberlin
- Allen Brooks, Richard's assistant – J.A. Preston
- Ginger Livingston, Charley's roommate – Judith Kahan
- Senator Wayne Joplin, a liberal Senator and friend of Richard – Jack Dodson
- Lanny Wolf (1977), aide to President Carter – Michael Keaton

Crew

- Norman Lear – Production Supervisor
- Michael Elias – Producer
- Rod Parker – Executive Producer
- Bob Claver – Director
- Hal Cooper – Director
- Bob Schiller – Writer and Producer
- Bob Weiskopf – Writer and Producer
- Ben Stein – Consultant and writer

== Episodes ==
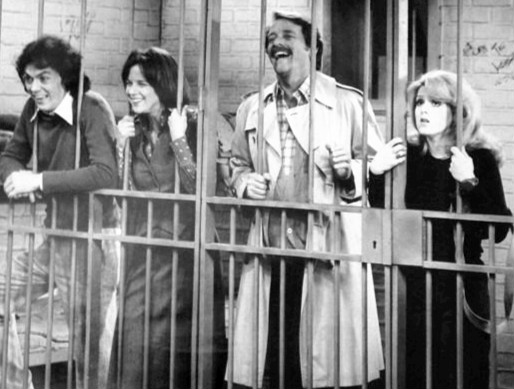
L-R: Michael Keaton, Judith Kahan, Richard Crenna, and Bernadette Peters (1977)

No.	Title	Directed by	Written by	Original release date	Prod. code	Tape date
1	"Strange Bedfellows"	Hal Cooper	Bob Schiller, Bob Weiskopf and Rod Parker	September 20, 1976	101	TBA
2	"Jealousy"	Bob Claver	Albert E. Lewin	September 27, 1976	104	TBA
3	"A Perfect Evening"	Bob Claver	Gy Waldron	October 4, 1976	106	TBA
4	"Living Together"	Bob Claver	Sybil Adelman	October 18, 1976	108	TBA
5	"Discovery Day"	Bob Claver	Michael Loman, Bob Schiller, & Bob Weiskopf	October 25, 1976	102	TBA
6	"Election Eve"	Bob Claver	Bud Wiser	November 1, 1976	107	TBA
7	"The Gang Leader"	Bob Claver	Karen Bachar (s), Dixie Brown Grossman, Ron Friedman	November 8, 1976	112	November 1, 1976
8	"Happy Anniversary: Part 1"	Bob Claver	Michael Loman	November 15, 1976	110	October 12, 1976
9	"Happy Anniversary: Part 2"	Bob Claver	Unknown	November 22, 1976	111	TBA
10	"The Weekend"	Unknown	Bob Van Scoyk	November 29, 1976	105	TBA
11	"The Leak"	Bob Claver	Don Hinkley, Peter Gallay	December 13, 1976	103	TBA
12	"True Confessions"	Bob Claver	Sylvie Adelman (s), Bob Van Scoyk (s/t), Bud Wiser (s/t)	December 20, 1976	114	December 7, 1976
13	"Love and Marriage: Part 1"	Bob Claver	Bob Van Scoyk	January 3, 1977	109	TBA
14	"Love and Marriage: Part 2"	J.D. Lobue	Bud Wiser	January 17, 1977	113	November 10, 1976
15	"Lucy's Job Offer"	Bob Claver	Howard Ostroff	February 7, 1977	116	December 21, 1976
16	"President Requests: Part 1"	Bob Claver	Tom Whedon	February 14, 1977	115	December 14, 1976
17	"President Requests: Part 2"	Bob Claver	Rod Parker	February 21, 1977	117	December 14, 1976
18	"In Name Only"	Bob Claver	Michael Elias and Bob Van Scoyk	February 28, 1977	118	TBA
19	"Save the Yak"	Bob Claver	Howard Ostroff	March 7, 1977	119	TBA
20	"Remembrance"	Bob Claver	Tom Whedon	March 14, 1977	120	TBA
21	"The Dick and Vanessa Show"	Bob Claver	Tom Whedon	March 28, 1977	124	TBA
22	"The Jailbirds: Part 1"	Unknown	Unknown	April 23, 1977	122	TBA
23	"The Jailbirds: Part 2"	Bob Claver	Rod Parker	April 30, 1977	123	TBA
24	"Charley's Father"	Bob Claver	Ron Friedman	May 30, 1977	121	TBA

== Reception ==
The reviewer for Knight News Wire wrote that the show "looks like the best new comedy series of the year...The show looks sound in both writing and acting ... the characters spend a lot of time shouting. Lear seems to have decided ... that high-decibel dialogue is necessary to hold the attention of a large audience."

The critic for The New York Times wrote that "The casting is first-rate and the finger-snapping pace of the show leaves just about everything looking easy and undemanding.

The reviewer for Copley News Service wrote that he did not believe in the relationship (between Crenna and Peters). However, he wrote that "it works. It works because Crenna is an expert farceur and Peters is, well, cute and full of the old ginger. It works because the dialogue has crackle and wit. ... Peters has spunk and spirit and a bawdy and snappishly delightful wit ... a well-paced, intelligently conceived and altogether trenchant comedy and I don't see how it can miss."

== Awards and nominations ==
- Golden Globe, 1977, Best Performance by an Actress in a Television Series - Comedy or Musical - Bernadette Peters (nominated)

== See also ==
- The Powers That Be
