= Jeanna Michaels =

American actress

- Born: May 9, 1956; New London, Connecticut
- Died: May 23, 2018 (aged 62)
- Occupation: Actress
- Years active: 1978–

Jeanna Michaels (May 9, 1956 – May 23, 2018) was an American actress, known for her soap opera roles as Lydia Saunders on Santa Barbara (1988–89), Constance Townley on General Hospital (1983) and Karen Richards on The Young and the Restless (1981–82). Between 1979 and 1981, she portrayed Bobby Ewing's first secretary, Connie Brasher, on Dallas. She died from Lymphoma.

== Television roles ==
- Dallas as Connie Brasher (33 episodes, 1978–1981)
- The Young and the Restless as Karen Richards (1981–1982)
- General Hospital as Constance Townley (1983)

Knight Rider as Lauren Royce (1983)

- Safe at Home as Tatum McCoy (1985–1986)
- Santa Barbara as Lydia Saunders (1988–1989)
- Generations as Madame Rosa (1991)
- Who's the Boss? season 2 episode 18 “When worlds collide” as Emily (1986)
