= Bad Manners (1984 film) =

1984 film by Robert Houston

- Bad Manners Region 2 DVD cover
- Directed by: Bobby Houston
- Written by: Bobby Houston; Joseph Kwong
- Produced by: Kim Jorgensen
- Starring: Martin Mull; Karen Black; Anne De Salvo; Murphy Dunne; Georg Olden; Pamela Segall; Michael Hentz; Joey Coleman; Christopher Brown
- Cinematography: Jan De Bont
- Edited by: Barry Zetlin
- Music by: Ron & Russell Mael ("Sparks"); Michael J. Lewis (additional music)
- Production companies: Growing Pains Productions, Inc.
- Distributed by: New World Pictures
- Release date: June 1, 1984 (Fort Worth, Texas)
- Running time: 82 minutes
- Country: United States
- Language: English

Bad Manners (also known as Growing Pains) is a 1984 American black comedy teen film released by New World Pictures. Written and directed by Robert Houston and produced by Kim Jorgensen, the film follows a group of juvenile delinquents who escape the oppressive Catholic orphanage where they live in order to rescue one of their fellow "inmates". While the film's adult stars Martin Mull, Karen Black, Anne De Salvo, and Murphy Dunne received top billing in promotional materials, the story is told through the perspective of the adolescent protagonists; played by Georg Olden, Pamela Segall, Michael Hentz, Joey Coleman, and Christopher Brown.

== Synopsis ==
The film begins at the ominous "Home of the Bleeding Heart" Catholic orphanage, where teenage delinquent "Piper" (Georg Olden) arrives by police escort. There he meets the cruel overseers: the stern head-mistress of the orphanage, Sister Serena (Anne De Salvo), and the cattle-prod wielding head-master, Mr. Kurtz (Murphy Dunne). After disobeying the home's loathsome authority figures, Piper is sent into solitary confinement, where he befriends a group of adolescent trouble-makers; "Girl Joey" (Pamela Segall), the tough-talking tomboy of the group; "Mouse" (Michael Hentz), the smallest, youngest and "cutest" of the group; "Whitey" (Joey Coleman), the platinum blonde, self-appointed "leader" of the group; and "Blackie" (Christopher Brown), the "intellectual" and only black orphan at the home.

As prospective "parents" come to the Home of the Bleeding Heart to assess the children for adoption, the orphans, desperate not to be separated from the "family" they have in each other, make every attempt not to be selected. However, the family of young misfits is shattered when the Fitzpatricks (Martin Mull and Karen Black), a self-absorbed upper-class couple, find Mouse irresistible and decide to adopt him, promptly whisking him away to their suburban home in Santa Barbara, California. Devastated by Mouse's departure, the group of young rebels devise a plan to "rescue" him, outwitting the maniacal staff and escaping the oppressive orphanage. In their odyssey to free Mouse, the four street-smart teenagers lie, cheat, and steal their way to Santa Barbara, wreaking havoc on suburbia every step of the way.

== Cast ==
- Martin Mull as Warren Fitzpatrick
- Karen Black as Gladys Fitzpatrick
- Anne De Salvo as Sister Serena
- Murphy Dunne as Mr. Kurtz
- Georg Olden as Piper
- Pamela Segall as Girl Joey
- Michael Hentz as Mouse / Bartholomew
- Joey Coleman as "Whitey"
- Christopher Brown as "Blackie"
- Stephen Stucker as Dr. Bender
- Kimmy Robertson as Sarah Fitzpatrick
- John Paul Lussier as Garth Fitzpatrick
- Edy Williams as Mrs. Slatt
- Hy Pyke as Mr. Slatt
- Gertrude Flynn as Mother Celestina
- Lark Hackshaw as Nurse Bates
- Bill Quinones as Pepe
- Seth Wagerman as "Professor"
- Thomas Stokes as "Chubby"
- Michelle Cundey as Suzy Trotter
- Marshall Efron as Cab Driver
- Susan Ruttan as Biker
- Richard Deacon as Ticket Salesman
- Bridget Sienna as "Carnation"
- Barry Cutler as Pizza Man
- Steve Lalande as Gay Guy
- Drew Davis as Teenage Samurai
- Rex Ryon as Policeman
- Robert Houston as Retard
- Jamal-Dominique Hopkins as Orphan

== Production ==
Although listed by several online sources under the title Growing Pains, in his October 1984 review of the film, Boston Phoenix film critic Owen Gleiberman consistently referred to the film by the title Bad Manners. The film was both written and directed by, then 29-year-old, Robert Houston (credited as "Bobby Houston"), whose only previous writing/directing credit was the Samurai themed action-adventure feature film, Shogun Assassin. Filmed in 1983 and produced by Growing Pains Productions, Bad Manners was released by New World Pictures in October 1984.

== Locations ==
The Preston School of Industry in Ione, California was used for most of the outside shots of the Bleeding Heart Orphanage. The Law Firm of Harold Greenberg in Los Angeles was used for some other outside shots, and likely many inside shots. The location for the adopting parents' house is somewhere in the suburbs of Santa Barbara, California.

== Music ==
Songs for the film's soundtrack were written by Ron Mael and Russell Mael of Sparks. Michael J. Lewis composed additional music. Sparks also performed several of the songs for the film, including the film's title song, "Bad Manners", "Motorcycle Midget", "What You're Wearing" (Duet with Laurie Bell) and "Bad Manners (Reprise)" performed by Sparks". Other songs include "Things Can Change Overnight" performed by Adele Bertei, "Descended From the Apes" performed by Charlie Sexton, "Riot With Me" performed by Laurie Bell, "Screaming (a.k.a. Scared)" performed by Runnings, and "It's Kinda Like The Movies" performed by Gleaming Spires. The original version of Sparks' title song is called "Growing Pains" (reflecting the movie's original name) and has different lyrics. As of 2021, none of the songs have been officially released, but can be found on various websites.

== Reception ==
Targeted to a young audience, the film has received largely negative reviews from adult critics. In his October 2, 1984 review for the Boston Phoenix, film critic Owen Gleiberman criticized Houston's directing, writing, "Houston has fashioned a cinematic contradiction: the corporate cult film. He's taken the derisive black comedy of directors like John Waters and the pre-70s Roger Corman and repackaged it like laundry detergent.", adding, "Local publicists have been telling me that this is going to be the first cult movie for kids, but somehow it's hard to imagine packs of 12-year-olds jamming the Nickelodeon for an R-rated movie about abused orphans." Despite finding elements of the film cynical and contrived, Gleiberman would go on to praise some of the young stars' performances, writing "The actors are agreeably rowdy prepubescents, and a couple of them are genuine finds. As Piper, Georg Olden has a charisma and physical grace far beyond his years, and musclebound Christopher Brown playing a suave black kid named, uh, Blackie, has the penetrating presence of a mini Yaphet Kotto."

In her overview of the film, Eleanor Mannikka of AllRovi felt the "comedy" elements of the film fell short, writing "Everyone is a stereotypical extreme in this sometimes mean-spirited black comedy about the vicious staff at an orphanage, the garrulous punk kids who live there, and the pretentious overblown rich couple who adopt one of the orphans – this is not a happy world. [...] With a low-brow, low-budget approach, the premises are obviously meant to key in to the slapstick characterizations, but for some viewers, even the comic moments may not assuage the meaner undertones of the film." TV Guide's review felt the film had potential, but was played too over-the-top: "Sort of a modern-day version of Oliver Twist, Bad Manners was an independently made movie that might have made noise at the box office had more attention been paid to detail and less to overplaying. [...] The film takes lots of whacks at "The Establishment," and the shame of it is that in the right hands this might have been a good film."
