= The Couch Trip =

1988 film by Michael Ritchie

- Theatrical release poster
- Directed by: Michael Ritchie
- Screenplay by: Steven Kampmann; William Porter; Sean Stein; Walter Bernstein
- Based on: The Couch Trip by Ken Kolb
- Produced by: Lawrence Gordon
- Starring: Dan Aykroyd; Charles Grodin; Donna Dixon; Richard Romanus; David Clennon; Arye Gross; Walter Matthau
- Cinematography: Donald E. Thorin
- Edited by: Richard A. Harris
- Music by: Michel Colombier
- Distributed by: Orion Pictures
- Release date: January 15, 1988
- Running time: 97 minutes
- Country: United States
- Language: English
- Budget: $19 million
- Box office: $11 million

The Couch Trip is a 1988 American comedy film directed by Michael Ritchie, and written by Steven Kampmann, William Porter, Sean Stein, and Walter Bernstein. The film stars Dan Aykroyd, Charles Grodin, Donna Dixon, Richard Romanus, David Clennon, Arye Gross, and Walter Matthau. Based on the 1971 novel, The Couch Trip, by Ken Kolb, the film follows John Burns (Aykroyd), a misfit patient at a Chicago mental facility who escapes confinement by impersonating his doctor Lawrence Baird. John takes a job in Beverly Hills as a therapist and radio host, where his unconventional style quickly gains popularity. Along the way, he develops a romantic interest in fellow therapist Dr. Laura Rollins (Dixon) and forms an unlikely bond with Donald Becker (Matthau), a kleptomaniac ex-priest and fellow misfit.

The Couch Trip failed to recoup its budget at the box office during its theatrical release, and received a generally negative critical response.

== Plot ==
In Beverly Hills, California, psychiatrist and radio host Dr. George Maitlin has a nervous breakdown after having an affair with his patient. He takes a sabbatical in London to recover, instructing his lawyer, Harvey Michaels, to temporarily replace him with someone who will not outshine him.

Meanwhile, at a Chicago state correctional mental facility, misfit patient John Burns embarrasses chief doctor Lawrence Baird by successfully talking down a suicidal jumper after Baird fails. Fed up with John's antics, Lawrence arranges to have him transferred to Joliet Prison, suspecting John is faking insanity to avoid serving his four-year sentence there. While Lawrence is distracted, John intercepts a call from Harvey, impersonates Lawrence to accept the offer, and escapes to Beverly Hills using Lawrence's waiting plane ticket.

At the airport, John is met by George's colleague, Dr. Laura Rollins, to whom he is immediately attracted. He also encounters Donald Becker, a kleptomaniac former priest who notices John's prison-issued pants. John bluffs his way into a $200,000 upfront cash salary, which Harvey agrees to deliver within two days. He then books a plane ticket, intending to flee to Mexico City.

On his first day hosting the radio show, John shocks the staff with his blunt, profane, and often vulgar advice to callers. However, his popularity and the show's audience quickly grow, prompting Harvey to ask him to replace George permanently. Later, Donald calls John from a local mental hospital, threatening to expose him as an escaped prisoner unless he gets to join his scheme.

The next day, John is greeted by hundreds of prospective patients at George's practice, drawn by his on-air offer of free therapy. Unable to see them all individually, he takes them to a baseball game, where he listens to their problems and offers unorthodox advice, impressing Laura with his genuine compassion. That night, Donald admits he is reluctantly starting to trust John, revealing that he fell for a woman who convinced him to burn down his church for the insurance money, only to betray him and run off with the cash.

Meanwhile, George and Lawrence cross paths at a conference in London. A misunderstanding about the money sent to the impostor Lawrence leads George's wife, Vera, to confess an affair with Harvey. Furious, George and Lawrence fly back to Beverly Hills.

Donald discovers John's plane ticket and, feeling betrayed, storms off. Feeling guilty, John searches for him. He visits Laura, who reveals that Lawrence contacted her and revealed the truth, leaving her heartbroken by John's deception. John attends a dinner honoring George, where Harvey gives him the $200,000 cash. Lawrence arrives, but the staff dismiss him as an impostor and restrain him for erratic behavior. Meanwhile, a manic George forces Harvey to help recover his money.

At the airport, John sees Donald on TV standing on the Hollywood Sign, screaming his name and threatening to jump. John secures the cash in a locker, rushes to the sign, and makes a dangerous climb to reach Donald. The pair reconcile, and he gives Donald the locker key, urging him to start a new life. On the ground, John is arrested and identified as a fugitive. Denied his money, George tries to shoot Harvey but is arrested himself, ruining his reputation.

Sometime later, George is committed to a mental facility alongside Lawrence, who is still unable to convince anyone of his true identity. En route to prison, John is rescued by Donald and a disguised Laura. She bids the pair farewell as John reluctantly goes on the run with Donald, who has stolen the key to Harvey's yacht.

== Cast ==
- Dan Aykroyd as John William Burns, Jr.
- Walter Matthau as Donald Becker
- Charles Grodin as George Maitlin
- Donna Dixon as Laura Rollins
- David Clennon as Lawrence Baird
- Richard Romanus as Harvey Michaels
- Arye Gross as Perry Kovin
- Mary Gross as Vera Maitlin
- Victoria Jackson as Robin
- Michael Ensign as Hendricks
- David Wohl as Dr. Smet
- Scott Thomson as Klevin
- Mickey Jones as Watkins
- J. E. Freeman as Unger
- Michael DeLorenzo as Lopez

The cast also includes Beverly Archer as Mrs. Guber, Carol Mansell as Mrs. Blair, and Robert Hirschfeld as Night Watchman. Chevy Chase makes a cameo appearance as "Condom Father" in a condom advertisement.

== Reception ==
=== Box office ===
The Couch Trip was released in the United States and Canada on January 15, 1988. During its opening weekend it grossed a total of $3.4 million from 1,332 theaters—an average of $2,516 per theater—making it the seventh-highest grossing film of the weekend, behind Broadcast News ($3.6 million) in its fifth week of release, and ahead of Throw Momma from the Train ($2.8 million) in its sixth. In its second weekend, The Couch Trip fell to the number 8 position with a $2.08 million gross—a 37.7% drop from the previous week—placing it behind Throw Momma from the Train ($2.1 million), and ahead of Return of the Living Dead Part II ($1.8 million), also in its second weekend.

In its third weekend, The Couch Trip retained the number 8 position with a $1.4 million gross, placing it behind Fatal Attraction ($1.45 million), in its twentieth weekend, and ahead of Braddock: Missing in Action III ($1.35 million), in its second. Further details of the box office performance of The Couch Trip are unavailable.

In total, The Couch Trip grossed $11 million in the United States and Canada, making it the 90th-highest-grossing film of 1988.

=== Critical response ===
The movie received mixed reviews. On Rotten Tomatoes, it has a rating of 40%, based on 10 reviews.

== Home media ==
Although the film was a flop at the box office, it did well when released on home video.
