= Kids' Writes =

American television program

- Genre: Arts; Musical
- Created by: Jim Mairs
- Directed by: Jim Mairs; Dick Heller; Christopher Sarson
- Starring: Jim Mairs; Wynn White; Carlo Grossman; John Rousseau; Steve Rifkin
- Composers: Jim Mairs; Steve Rifkin
- Country of origin: United States
- Original language: English
- No. of seasons: 1
- No. of episodes: 17

Production
- Producer: Christopher Sarson
- Running time: 30 minutes
- Production company: Embassy Television

Original release
- Network: Nickelodeon
- Release: 1981 – 1983

Kids' Writes is an American educational children's television series that aired on Nickelodeon from 1981 to 1983. The main cast included Jim Mairs (who also acted as director/guitarist/vocalist), Wynn White, Carlo Grossman, John Rousseau, and Steve Rifkin.
