= Russ Petranto =

American television director

- Occupation: Television director
- Years active: 1973–1992

Russ Petranto is an American television director. He directed for television programs including Too Close for Comfort, Sanford and Son (and its spin-off Sanford Arms), C.P.O. Sharkey, Rocky Road, Full House, The Munsters Today, Out of This World, She's the Sheriff and Down to Earth.

In 1992 Petranto directed the ABC News Presentation The Best of Barbara Walters Legends: The New Generation.
