= Ramon Bieri =

American actor (1929–2001)

- Bieri in 1980
- Born: Ramon Arens Bieri; June 16, 1929
- Died: May 27, 2001 (aged 71); Woodland Hills, Los Angeles, California, U.S
- Occupation: Actor
- Years active: 1962–2001

Ramon Arens Bieri (June 16, 1929 – May 27, 2001) was an American film and television actor.

== Career ==
Bieri made guest appearances in many TV shows, including Daniel Boone, Gunsmoke, Little House on the Prairie, Bonanza, Hawaii Five-O, Kolchak: The Night Stalker, The Rockford Files, Buck Rogers in the 25th Century, The Dukes of Hazzard, The Partridge Family, Hogan's Heroes, Quincy, M.E., Mannix and Knight Rider.

He was featured in recurring roles in Room 222 (as the vice principal) and St. Elsewhere. He appeared in The Final Chapter, the first episode of the 1977 NBC series Quinn Martin's Tales of the Unexpected and an episode of the NBC series The Eddie Capra Mysteries (1978). His last role was in an episode of HBO's Arliss which aired in August 2001 which was a little over two months after his death.

In 1971–72, he played Lieutenant Barney Verick in the NBC drama Sarge.

Bieri in Bret Maverick, 1981

Bieri starred as the title character in the NBC sitcom Joe's World, from December 1979 to July 1980, playing Joe Wabash, a Detroit housepainter with a wife and five kids. He co-starred on the 1981 TV series Bret Maverick with James Garner, as banker Elijah Crow.

Film roles included Badlands, The Sicilian, The Grasshopper, Grandview, U.S.A., Reds, and The Andromeda Strain.

== Death ==
Bieri died of cancer in Woodland Hills, Los Angeles, California, on May 27, 2001, at age 71.

== Filmography ==
Year	Title	Role	Notes
1966	Hogan's Heroes	Steiner	1 episode
1968–1974	Gunsmoke	Forbes / Jarvis / John Sontag / Doyle / Musgrove / Big Thicket	6 episodes
1969–1970	Room 222	Vice Principal Gil Casey	4 episodes
1969–1971	Mission: Impossible	Colonel Rodriguez / Colonel Jaroslav Sardner	2 episodes
1970	The Grasshopper	Roosevelt Dekker	Directed by Jerry Paris
1970	R. P. M.	Brown	Directed by Stanley Kramer
1970	Mannix	Earl Waldon	1 episode
1971	The Andromeda Strain	Major Manchek	
1971	Brother John	Orly Ball	
1971–1973	Bonanza	Jonas Holt / Sheriff Solomon Budd	2 episodes
1971–1972	Alias Smith and Jones	Ted Thompson / Sheriff Moody	
1972	The Honkers	Jack Ferguson	
1973	Badlands	Cato	Directed by Terrence Malick
1973	The Partridge Family	Mr. Grisby	
1973	Outrage	Deputy Tottif	ABC Movie of the Week
1974	The Conversation	Man at Party	Uncredited
1974	The Rockford Files	Sheriff Homer Prouty	
1974	It's Good to Be Alive	Walter O'Malley	Television film
1974	Little House on the Prairie	Liam O'Neil	1 episode
1974	Police Story	Josef Stavo	1 episode
1974–1975	Kolchak: The Night Stalker	Captain Joe Baker / Captain Webster	2 episodes
1974–1976	Cannon	Lt. Lancaster / Captain Stiles	3 episodes
1976	Crazed	Malcolm	
1976	Bronk	O' Flanagan	1 episode
1976	Jigsaw John	Gus Constantine	1 episode
1977	The Rhinemann Exchange	Daniel Meehan	1 episode
1977	Sorcerer	Corlette	
1978	Wheels	Ernie Johnson	TV Mini-Series
1978	Quincy, M.E.	Ben Mular	1 episode
1978	How the West Was Won	General Sheridan	4 episodes
1978	True Grit: A Further Adventure	Sheriff Ambrose	TV movie
1978	The Eddie Capra Mysteries	Barney Kirk	1 episode
1979	The Frisco Kid	Mr. Jones	
1979–1980	Joe's World	Joe Wabash (titular character)	11 episodes
1980	A Christmas Without Snow	Henry Quist	TV movie
1981	Buck Rogers in the 25th Century	Commissioner Bergstrom	1 episode
1981	Reds	Police Chief	
1982	The Fall Guy	Mayor John P. Littlefield	2 episodes
1983	Matt Houston	Insp. Cory McFadden	1 episode
1984	The Dukes of Hazzard	J.J. Carver	2 episodes
1984	Grandview, U.S.A.	Roger Pearson	
1982–1985	Knight Rider	Al Farland / 'Acid' John Byrock	2 episodes
1985	The Zoo Gang	Pa Donnely	
1985	Highway to Heaven	Sheriff Harm	1 episode
1985	Hunter	Charlie Coster	1 episode
1985-1987	St. Elsewhere	Gene Galecki	4 episodes
1986	The Richest Cat in the World	Oscar Kohlmeyer	1 episode
1986	Crazy Like a Fox	Fontana	1 episode
1986	Blacke's Magic	Victor Kroeger/Capt. Luis Gondolpho	1 episode
1987	The Sicilian	Quintana	
1988	Vibes	Eli Diamond	
1991	Love, Lies and Murder	Howard	2 episodes
1994	Children of the Dark	T. Hardy Fallbrook	TV movie
1997	ER	Mr. Bartok	1 episode
1996	Ghosts of Mississippi	James Holley	Directed by Rob Reiner
1998	Profiler	Monte Drake	1 episode
1999	Cracker: Mind Over Murder	Witness	1 episode
2001	Cover Me: Based on the True Life of an FBI Family	Mr. Crowe	1 episode
2001	Arli$$	Jake	1 episode
