= How to Eat Like a Child =

- Also known as: How to Eat Like a Child – And Other Lessons in Not Being a Grown-up
- Genre: Musical, comedy
- Based on: 'How to Eat Like a Child' by Delia Ephron
- Screenplay by: Judith Kahan
- Starring: Dick Van Dyke; Darien Dash; Corey Feldman; Andy Freeman; Brandon Goldstein; Paula Hoffman; Rachel Jacobs; Billy Jacoby; Sunshine Lee; John Louie; Arlene McIntyre; Christy Murrill; Georg Olden; Rick Segall; Rebecca Wolfe; Kimberly Woodward
- Theme music composer: John Forster
- Country of origin: United States
- Original language: English

Production
- Running time: 60 minutes
- Production company: MTM Enterprises

Original release
- Network: NBC
- Release: September 22, 1981

How to Eat Like a Child – And Other Lessons in Not Being a Grown-up is an original musical comedy television special that aired on NBC on September 22, 1981. Based on Delia Ephron's best-selling book of the same name, and adapted for television by Judith Kahan with music and lyrics by John Forster, the one-hour special, through a series of comedy skits and songs, lampoons the adult world through the eyes of children. The musical variety stars Dick Van Dyke as the resident "grown-up" alongside 15 children (8 boys and 7 girls) ranging in age from 7 to 13. Several of the special's young performers would subsequently go on to achieve child stardom in their own right, most notably Corey Feldman, Billy Jacoby and Georg Olden.

== Synopsis ==
Dick Van Dyke opens the musical, stating "When you're a child, having fun is what you do for a living". As the "guest adult", Van Dyke seeks admission to the secret world of children and persuades a group of 15 singing and dancing kids to guide him on a wry and whimsical trip through childhood. Throughout a series of 12 comedy sketches and songs, the special takes an irreverent, but good-natured look at the time-honored dilemmas that children face.

The musical sketches include: "How to Eat Like a Child" (bite a hole in the bottom of the cone and suck out the ice cream.), "How to Stay Home from School" (flu, mumps, stomach ache, or maybe all three.), "How to Understand Parents" ("We'll see" means "no", "Not now" means "no", "Ask your father" means "no"...), "How to Laugh Hysterically" (a young Corey Feldman makes prank phone calls and cracks juvenile jokes before hanging up), "How to Act After Being Sent to Your Room" ("With nothing but my private stereo media center to keep me distracted, I think they overreacted..."), "How to Beg for a Dog" (Billy Jacoby playing opposite Judith Kahan's real-life stepson's four-legged friend, "Bandit"), "How to Torture Your Sister" (a quartet of boys antagonizing their female siblings), "How to Deal with Injustice" (having to walk to the candy store when the adults can just get in a car and drive), "How to Practice the Violin" (a pre-adolescent Georg Olden transforms into rock-star Mick Jagger after growing tired of practicing his violin), and the big finale number, "How to Refuse to Go to Sleep".

A couple of the numbers take on more serious issues that children face, including "How to Wait" (a segment which depicts a youngster impatiently waiting to be picked up at a bus stop, while addressing a child's anxieties and fears about being left alone), and "The Kid Inside" (a song in which Van Dyke provides an adult's perspective as he confides in the youngsters that children aren't the only ones to experience sadness and disappointment when one of their prized possessions is damaged and/or destroyed).

== Cast ==
- Dick Van Dyke – Host
- Darien Dash – Darien
- Corey Feldman – Corey
- Andy Freeman – Andy
- Brandon Goldstein – Brandon
- Paula Hoffman – Paula
- Rachel Jacobs – Rachel
- Billy Jacoby – Billy
- Sunshine Lee – Sunshine
- John Louie – John
- Arlene McIntyre – Arlene
- Christy Murrill – Christy
- Georg Olden – Georg
- Rick Segall – Ricky
- Rebecca Wolfe – Rebecca
- Kimberly Woodward – Kimberly
- Bandit Kampmann – Dog

== Production ==
The special was based on Delia Ephron's best-selling book, "How to Eat Like a Child" (written largely from an "adult" perspective, appealing to adults who enjoyed the memories of childhood) and was adapted for television by Judith Kahan, an alum of Boston University and the improvisational comedy troupe "The Proposition". Produced by MTM Enterprises, Kahan worked on the script for a year, while competing with Walt Disney Productions, which had wanted to adapt the book as an animated cartoon. The special's 12 original songs were written by composer-lyricist John Forster.

Making its television premiere on Tuesday, September 22, 1981 (7pm or 8pm, depending on the time-zone), "How to Eat" aired as one of NBC's "Project Peacock" children's specials, the first series of prime-time specials for youngsters and their families on network television and was billed as "a look at the manners, language and logic of adults in training." The special aired as part of NBC's "theme week" entitled "Get High on Yourself" which had begun that Sunday, September 20, 1981, and that NBC deemed in its press materials as "the biggest and most concentrated, positive, alternative-to-drugs campaign ever produced for television."

== Reception ==
"How to Eat" received largely positive reviews from critics, who commended everything from the insightful writing to the witty songs, as well as the special's talented young performers. The Chicago Tribune's television critic Marilyn Preston wrote, "The show has fun with children, as opposed to those that make fun of children, which is what most kid shows do. A talented writer-producer named Judith Kahan put this one together, basing her cleverness on the cleverness of Delia Ephron who wrote the original book. [...] Thanks to 12 mostly terrific tunes by composer-lyricist John Forster, it's a reasonably fast and funny story. [...] Each skit has a theme and a song, and each song has a story to tickle your funnybone or your memory, depending on your age. [...] NBC could do a lot worse with its children's programming...and usually does."

Baltimore Sun critic Bill Carter expressed appreciation for the special's young performers, writing "(How to Eat Like a Child) is an hour of true children's entertainment – that means both that it will entertain children and that children do the entertaining. They sing, they dance, they cut up and they outperform just about every adult you've seen on a variety show in years. [...] If any big person can scale down to the level of a kid, without being condescending, it's the always elastic Van Dyke. The real performers, however, are 15 energetic, gifted young people, many of whom may be heading for future show-biz assignments after the act they pull off in this one. [...] The main kid, called George in the show (Georg Olden), has a kind of chip-on-the-shoulder mien; but he sings as sweetly as a choirboy. Another standout is a golden-haired youth (Andy Freeman) with a throat just as golden.

While somewhat concerned by some of the "lessons" children watching might learn (i.e. learning how to harass a sibling, or how to make "prank" phone calls), Boston Globe critic Robert A. McLean also praised the special, writing, "(Van Dyke) and the talented, charming kids assembled for the happy hour are aided and abetted by a marvelously-upbeat TV adaptation by Judith Kahan. [...] If you've ever been sent to your room, or told to pipe down and go to sleep, or heard one of the parental phrases which means 'no!', then this will be a special treat for you, regardless of your age. [...] All the kids are great. Rachel Jacobs, a blonde doll with a flair for histrionics is wonderful in a touching birthday sequence. [...] And Rebecca Wolfe (mistakenly giving her name as "Rachel Wolfe"), a saucy maid with spectacles and pigtails, is a low-key charmer who apparently could sell Van Dyke the Brooklyn Bridge."

Associated Press television writer Fred Rothenberg was less impressed with the network's attempt at a prime-time musical for children, writing "This is the kind of thing Public Broadcasting's Sesame Street and The Electric Company win awards for. But take the same concepts to network TV in prime time and it loses something in the translation and transition. [...] We watched the program with three neighborhood kids, ranging in age from 6 to 8. They seemed to enjoy watching the kids on the screen, but the musical variety nature of the program, the hook for adults in prime time, was lost on them completely." However, he, too, would go on to praise some of the elements of the special, writing, "There were some highlights. A fantasy imitation of Rolling Stone, Mick Jagger from a kid (Georg Olden) tired of practicing the violin (and) all the different ways parents say 'no'."

== Theatrical adaptation ==
After the television premiere of How to Eat Like a Child, the musical was subsequently adapted for the stage as a one-act musical revue performed exclusively by children, using songs from the original NBC special. The first theatrical production was by TADA! (the Theater And Dance Alliance) in New York City in 1984. As the original NBC production had used the child performers' real names (essentially crediting each child as portraying "himself" or "herself"), subsequent theatrical productions would continue to use the names of the original NBC players as the young characters' names in the stage adaptation. With the original special running approximately 45 minutes without commercials, the revue was also expanded to include a total of 22 lessons and 2 optional "supplemental" lessons. These 24 "Lessons" are:

- Lesson 1: How to Eat Like a Child – Part I
- Lesson 2: How to Stay Home from School
- Lesson 3: How to Ride in a Car
- Lesson 4: How to Laugh Hysterically
- Lesson 5: How to Practice the Violin
- Lesson 6: How to Express an Opinion
- Lesson 7: How to Beg for a Dog
- Lesson 8: How to Play
- Lesson 9: How to Understand Your Parents
- Lesson 10: More How to Laugh Hysterically
- Lesson 11: How to Eat Like a Child – Part II
- Lesson 12: How to Deal with Injustice
- Lesson 13: How to Hang Up the Telephone
- Lesson 14: How to Wait
- Lesson 15: How to Eat Like a Child – Part III
- Lesson 16: More How to Laugh Hysterically
- Lesson 17: How to Torture Your Sister
- Lesson 18: How to Look Forward to Your Birthday
- Lesson 19: How to Eat Like A Child – Part IV
- Lesson 20: How to Act After Being Sent to Your Room
- Lesson 21: How to Watch More Television
- Lesson 22: How to Go to Bed

- Supplemental Lessons (Optional)

- Lesson: How to Behave at School
- Lesson: How to Brag
