= Rush It =

- VHS cover
- Directed by: Gary Youngman
- Written by: Barbara Brenner; Gary Youngman
- Produced by: Robby Kenner; Bob Wunderlich
- Starring: Judith Kahan; Tom Berenger; Jill Eikenberry
- Cinematography: Don Lenzer
- Music by: Buzzy Linhart
- Production company: Just Spokes Productions
- Distributed by: Unicorn Pictures
- Release date: May 29, 1978
- Running time: 78 minutes
- Country: United States
- Language: English

Rush It is a 1978 American romance film co-written and directed by Gary Youngman in his directorial debut and starring Judith Kahan, Tom Berenger and Jill Eikenberry.

== Synopsis ==
A female bicycle messenger is looking for love in New York City.

== Cast ==
- Judith Kahan as Catherine
- Tom Berenger as Richard Moore
- Jill Eikenberry as Merrill
- John Heard as Byron
- Christina Pickles as Eve
- Martin Harvey Friedberg as Ernie
- Harriet Hall as Harriet

== See also ==
- Quicksilver
