= Joe's World =

1979 American sitcom TV series

- Genre: Sitcom
- Created by: Larry Rhine; Mel Tolkin
- Starring: Ramon Bieri
- Composer: Alan Thicke
- Country of origin: United States
- Original language: English
- No. of seasons: 1
- No. of episodes: 11 (list of episodes)

Production
- Camera setup: Multi-camera
- Running time: 30 minutes
- Production company: T.A.T. Communications Company

Original release
- Network: NBC
- Release: December 28, 1979 – July 26, 1980

Joe's World is an American sitcom that aired on NBC from December 28, 1979 to July 26, 1980.

== Premise ==
Joe is a hardworking house painter with a wife and five kids living in Detroit, yet he is deeply unhappy.

== Broadcast ==
The first two episodes were shown on a Friday night at 10 PM Eastern, with one episode airing the following Wednesday at 9:30 PM. The show was then put on hiatus, with the remaining episodes airing starting on Saturday, May 10 at 9:30 PM, with the final episode airing on July 2. The pilot episode did not air as the first episode, but rather as the fifth.

== Cast ==
- Ramon Bieri as Joe Wabash
- K Callan as Katie Wabash
- Christopher Knight as Steve Wabash
- Melissa Sherman as Maggie Wabash
- Michael Sharrett as Jimmy Wabash
- Ari Zeltzer as Rick Wabash
- Missy Francis as Linda Wabash
- Russ Banham as Brad Hopkins
- Misty Rowe as Judy Wilson
- Frank Coppola as Andy, a friend of Joe's

== Episodes ==
No.	Title	Directed by	Written by	Original release date
1	"The Invitation"	Herbert Kenwith	Larry Rhine and Mel Tolkin	December 28, 1979
Joe pressures his eldest son to become a house painter.
2	"Steve's Drinking Problem"	Herbert Kenwith	Burt Styler and Adele Styler	December 28, 1979
Katie is concerned over Steve's drinking. Things come to a head when Linda gets sick at school and a drunken Steve drives there to pick her up.
3	"The Woman Painters"	Herbert Kenwith	Al Schwartz and Ray Singer	January 2, 1980
Kate becomes concerned when Joe hires a beautiful female painter, worried he'll fall into temptation.
4	"Snowbound"	Herbert Kenwith	Jeremy Stevens and Tom Moore	May 10, 1980
The Wabash family is trapped inside their house during a blizzard.
5	"One in the Oven"	Herbert Kenwith	Gordon Mitchell	May 17, 1980
Katie announces that she is pregnant.
6	"Maggie Joins the Army"	John Bowab	Charles Stewart and Jack Elisson	May 31, 1980
A conflict over house rules prompts Maggie to join the Army.
7	"If Something Should Happen"	Jim Drake	Story by : Burt Styler, Adele Styler and Michael Endler; Teleplay by : Charles Stewart and Jack Ellison	June 7, 1980
Katie wants to secure the children's future.
8	"The Strike"	John Bowab	Story by : Larry Rhine and Mel Tolkin; Teleplay by : Joseph Bonaduce	June 14, 1980
Joe, Steve and Brad become embroiled in a dispute over the effects of paint enamel fumes on their health.
9	"The Gun"	Gerren Keith	Story by : Bill Daley; Teleplay by : Bill Daley, Joel Kimmel and Ann Gibbs	June 28, 1980
The family panics when a vigilant Joe buys a gun to protect the family.
10	"No Time for Jimmy"	Herbert Kenwith	Story by : Kenneth Lloyd and Jeffrey Lloyd; Teleplay by : Howard Ostroff and Phil Sharp	July 5, 1980
Joe misses his son's 13th birthday party when he gets the chance to supervise a large painting project.
11	"To Catch a Cheater"	Herbert Kenwith	Larry Rhine and Mel Tolkin	July 12, 1980
When Joe puts undue pressure on her, Maggie cheats on an exam.
