= ELP Communications =

American television production company

- Final official print logo, used from 1986 to 1987 while still active as Embassy Communications
- Formerly: T.A.T. Communications Company (1974–1982); Embassy Television (1982–1986); Embassy Telecommunications (1982–1986); Embassy Communications (1986–1988)
- Type: Subsidiary (1985–1987); In-name-only unit (1987–1998)
- Industry: Television production Broadcast syndication
- Founded: 1974; 52 years ago
- Founders: Norman Lear; Jerry Perenchio
- Defunct: 1998; 28 years ago
- Fate: Reduced to an in-name-only unit in 1987; remaining operations folded within a decade
- Headquarters: 10202 West Washington Boulevard, Culver City, California, United States
- Owner: The Coca-Cola Company (1985–1987); Sony Corporation of America (1989–2001)
- Parent: Columbia Pictures Entertainment (1987–1991); Sony Pictures Entertainment (1987–1998)
- Subsidiaries: Tandem Productions

ELP Communications (formerly known as T.A.T. Communications Company, Embassy Television, Embassy Telecommunications, and Embassy Communications) was an American television production company founded in 1974 by Norman Lear and Jerry Perenchio.

== History ==
=== Beginning ===
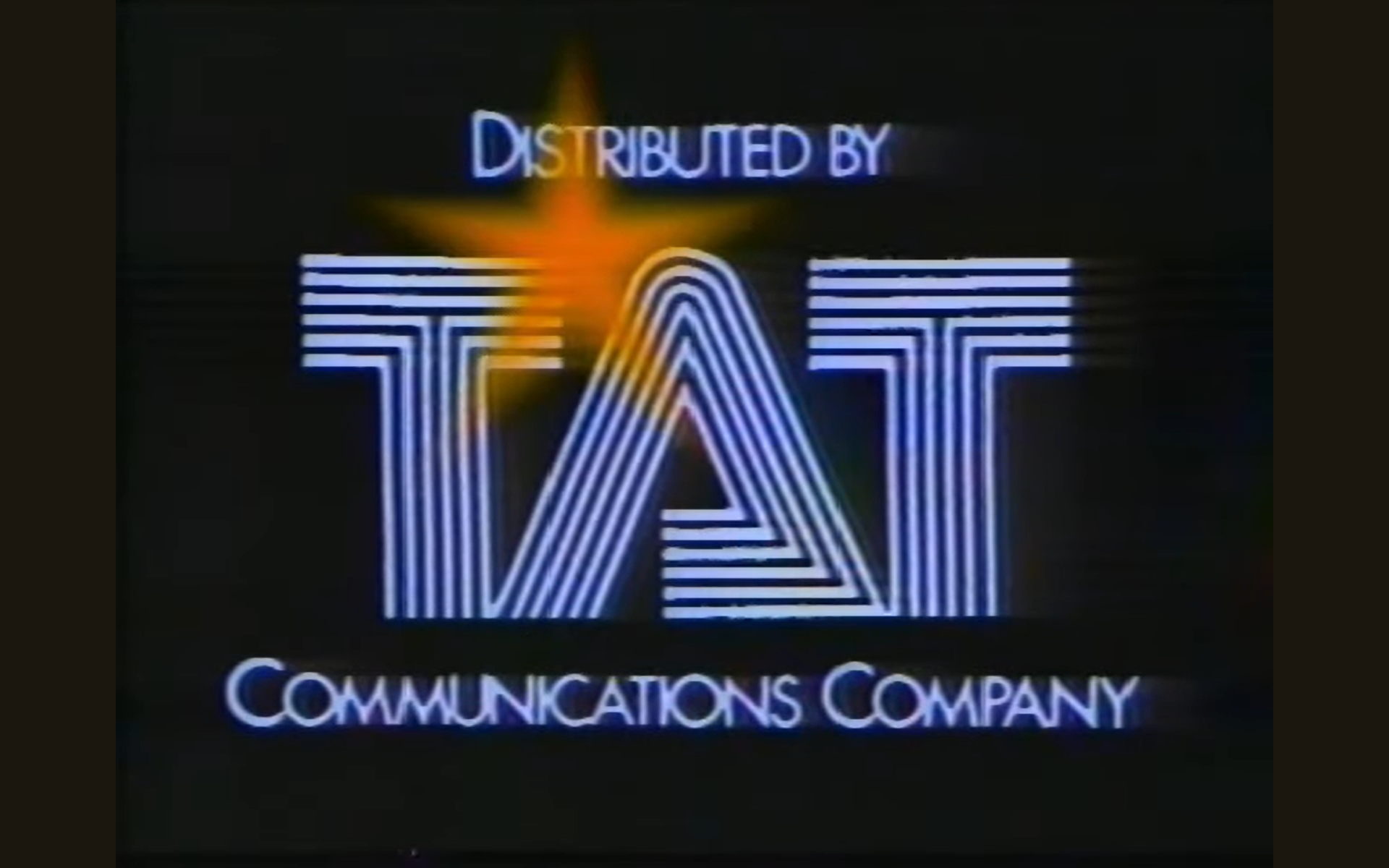
The logo of T.A.T. Communications Company

ELP Communications was originally formed in 1974 as T.A.T. Communications Company when Norman Lear joined up with former talent agent Jerry Perenchio, a year before Bud Yorkin ended his partnership with Lear. "T.A.T." stood for the Yiddish phrase "Tuchus Affen Tisch" (תּחת אויפֿן טיש), which meant "Putting one's ass on the table."

The first sitcom to be produced by T.A.T. Communications was The Jeffersons, which was spun off from the sitcom All in the Family in 1975. The company made its syndicated project with Mary Hartman, Mary Hartman through Rhodes Productions (a division of Filmways), only for the latter to withdraw support in order to get Norman Lear to launch its own syndicated unit.

=== Acquisition of Avco Embassy and rename ===
Television producer Norman Lear and his business partner Jerry Perenchio bought Avco Embassy Pictures Corporation in January 1982 and decided to drop the name "Avco" from the name to bring back the Embassy Pictures name, and T.A.T. Communications Co. was thus renamed Embassy Communications, Inc.

The television division was renamed as Embassy Television, a division name for his shows produced by the former T.A.T. Communications such as The Jeffersons, One Day at a Time, and The Facts of Life. More shows were produced by Embassy Television such as the first two under the name: Square Pegs and Silver Spoons. The latter show ran five seasons, while the former ran one but developed a cult following. Who's the Boss? was piloted later in 1983 until airing in 1984. Embassy Television also produced Diff'rent Strokes's final season from Tandem Productions, which was eventually operated by Embassy.

Embassy also held the television rights to a majority of the Embassy theatrical library, syndicated under the umbrella title Embassy Night at the Movies. Embassy Telecommunications was the television distribution arm of Embassy Television. They distributed off-net syndicated shows by Embassy Television and those by Tandem Productions and T.A.T. Communications. Tandem's PITS Films was folded into Embassy Telecommunications.

=== Coca-Cola era ===
Lear and Perenchio sold Embassy Communications (including Tandem Productions) to The Coca-Cola Company (then-current owners of Columbia Pictures) for $485 million on June 18, 1985. After the sale, Lear, Perenchio, nor Bud Yorkin were no longer involved with Embassy or Tandem. A month later in July 1985, CBS canceled The Jeffersons and Diff'rent Strokes was already canceled by NBC. Diff'rent Strokes was later moved to ABC. During the fall, a new Embassy sitcom called 227 debuted on NBC.

A year later, Embassy Communications became the only television banner as Embassy's television divisions (Embassy Television, Embassy Telecommunications, and Tandem Productions) were consolidated into the holding company.

When ABC canceled Diff'rent Strokes, the brand name Tandem Productions became dormant but remained active as an in-name-only division. On November 24, 1986, Coca-Cola fused Embassy's television operations including the movie packages (Embassy Night at the Movies, Embassy II and Embassy III) with Columbia Pictures Television; the combined company became Columbia/Embassy Television, though Columbia and Embassy continued to produce and distribute programs under their separate names. During that formation, Coca-Cola took Columbia and Embassy out of the first-run syndication business and focused them on first-run network and off-net syndication programming. This was also the formation of Coca-Cola Television when Coke regrouped Columbia Pictures Television, Embassy Communications, and Merv Griffin Enterprises. Married... with Children was the next—and as it would transpire, last—successful sitcom by Embassy Communications, debuting as part of the fledgling Fox Broadcasting Company's first primetime lineup in 1987.

=== Columbia Pictures Entertainment and Sony Pictures Entertainment eras ===
On December 18, 1987, Coca-Cola sold its entertainment business to Tri-Star Pictures, Inc. for $3.1 billion, and Tri-Star was immediately renamed as Columbia Pictures Entertainment. 13 days later, Columbia/Embassy Television merged with TriStar Television, forming a new version of Columbia Pictures Television. Subsequently, Embassy Communications was reduced to an in-name-only unit and became ELP Communications, and consequently, its still-running and newer shows would be marketed explicitly under the Columbia Pictures Television brand, though some of the still-running shows in question continued to credit their copyrights under the Embassy name on episodes that premiered before February 1988. Additionally, Embassy Night at the Movies was renamed as Columbia Night at the Movies. On November 8, 1989, Columbia Pictures Entertainment was sold to Sony; eventually, it was renamed as Sony Pictures Entertainment on August 7, 1991.

The final long-running show to be produced by ELP was Beakman's World in 1992. On February 11, 1994, SPE merged Columbia Pictures Television and the newly relaunched TriStar Television, forming Columbia TriStar Television, which immediately brought all series produced by CPT, ELP, TriStar and Merv Griffin Enterprises under the banner. Though Beakman's World began to be marketed explicitly under the CTT brand afterwards, most other shows would not follow suit until 1997. Beakman's World was cancelled in 1997 and subsequently, ELP Communications became dormant. While its remaining operations folded, ELP remains as a copyright holder for all of its television programs (from T.A.T. to ELP) to this day.

Currently, in addition to all rights to the T.A.T./Embassy/ELP television library, Sony Pictures Television holds television distribution rights to the Embassy theatrical library.

== Television series ==
- The Jeffersons (1975–1985)
- Hot l Baltimore (1975)
- One Day at a Time (1975–1984)
- The Dumplings (1976)
- All's Fair (1976–1977)
- Mary Hartman, Mary Hartman (1976–1977)
- The Nancy Walker Show (1976)
- All That Glitters (1977)
- Stick Around (1977)
- A Year at the Top (1977)
- Fernwood 2 Night (1977)
- Forever Fernwood (1977–1978)
- America 2-Night (1978)
- In the Beginning (1978)
- Hello, Larry (1979–1980)
- Highcliffe Manor (1979)
- McGurk: A Dog's Life (pilot) (1979)
- Hanging In (1979)
- The Baxters (1979–1980)
- The Facts of Life (1979–1988)
- Joe's World (1979–1980)
- Palmerstown, U.S.A. (1980–1981)
- Checking In (1981)
- Kids' Writes (1981–1983)
- Silver Spoons (1982–1987)
- Square Pegs (1982–1983)
- Who's the Boss? (1983–1992)
- a.k.a. Pablo (1984)
- Double Trouble (1984–1985)
- E/R (1984–1985)
- It's Your Move (1984–1985)
- Diff'rent Strokes (1985–1986; final season)
- 227 (1985–1990)
- The Charmings (1987–1988)
- Married... with Children (1987–1997)
- Sweet Surrender (1987)
- Everything's Relative (1987)
- Trial and Error (1988)
- Live-In (1989)
- One of the Boys (1989)
- The Famous Teddy Z (1989)
- Free Spirit (1989–1990)
- Living Dolls (1989)
- Sugar and Spice (1990)
- Married People (1990–1991)
- Top of the Heap (1991)
- The Powers That Be (1992–1993)
- Beakman's World (1992–1997)
- Vinnie & Bobby (1992)
- Phenom (1993–1994)
- George (1993–1994)
- 704 Hauser (1994)
- Muddling Through (1994)
- My Wildest Dreams (1995)

== Theatrical films ==
- Blue Collar (1978, as T.A.T. Communications Company) (distributed by Universal Pictures)
