= The Richest Cat in the World =

- Print advertisement
- Genre: Adventure; Biography; Drama; Family; Western
- Teleplay by: Marshall Efron; Alfa-Betty Olsen
- Story by: Les Alexander; Steve Ditlea
- Directed by: Greg Beeman
- Starring: Ramon Bieri; Steven Kampmann; Caroline McWilliams
- Music by: Peter Bernstein
- Country of origin: United States
- Original language: English

Production
- Executive producer: Les Alexander
- Producers: Alexander Gorby; Andy Rose
- Cinematography: George Koblasa
- Editor: Stanford C. Allen
- Running time: 120 minutes
- Production companies: Les Alexander Productions; Walt Disney Television

Original release
- Network: ABC
- Release: March 9, 1986

The Richest Cat in the World is a 1986 American made-for-television adventure drama film directed by Greg Beeman and released by Walt Disney Television. It originally aired March 9, 1986 as a presentation of The Disney Sunday Movie on ABC.

== Plot ==
The death of millionaire Oscar Kohlmeyer leaves an inheritance to a talking cat called Leo Kohlmeyer. Leo's inheritance is worth five million dollars while Oscar's nephew (Mr. Rigsby) gets twenty-five thousand dollars on the condition he doesn't contest the will. Being greedy and bossy, Mrs. Rigsby forces her husband to contest. The Rigsbys try to kidnap the cat.

== Primary cast ==
- Ramon Bieri as Oscar Kohlmeyer
- Steven Kampmann as Howard Piggans
- Caroline McWilliams as Paula Rigsby
- Steve Vinovich as Gus Barrett
- George Wyner as Victor Rigsby
- Brandon Call as Bart
- Kellie Martin as Veronica
- Palmer (the cat)
- Larry Hagman (uncredited) as the voice of Leo

== See also ==
- The Aristocats - Another Disney film with a similar plot.
