= Marc Olden =

American author (1933–2003)

Marc C. Olden
- Born: Marc Clarence Morse; December 25, 1933; Baltimore, Maryland, U.S.
- Died: September 5, 2003 (aged 69); New York City, New York, U.S.
- Writing career
- Genres: Crime fiction, Hardboiled, Mystery, Thriller

Marc Clarence Olden (December 25, 1933 – September 5, 2003) was an American author of mystery and suspense.

== Early life ==
Marc Clarence Morse was born in Baltimore, Maryland. His biological father's surname was Morse. He was raised by his mother and stepfather, both African-Americans, actress and model Courtenaye Lina Macbeth (1917–2015) and graphic designer Georg Olden (1920–1975). After Georg was hired as art director for CBS, the Oldens moved to New York City. Olden graduated from Queens College.

== Career ==
Marc Olden started his writing career with two works of non-fiction — a biography of Angela Davis and a study of cocaine in 1970s New York — before turning to the fiction genres of thriller and suspense. Under the pen name Robert Hawkes, Olden began writing the Narc series, which follows a policeman on a counterdrug task force.

== Bibliography ==
=== Narc novels ===
(As Robert Hawkes)

1. Narc (1973)
2. Death of a Courier (1974)
3. Death List (1974)
4. The Delgado Killings (1974)
5. Kill the Dragon (1974)
6. The Beauty Kill (1975)
7. Corsican Death (1975)
8. Death Song (1975)
9. Kill for It (1975)

=== Black Samurai novels ===
1. Black Samurai (1974)
2. The Golden Kill (1974)
3. Killer Warrior (1974)
4. The Deadly Pearl (1974)
5. The Inquisition (1974)
6. The Warlock (1975)
7. Sword of Allah (1975)
8. The Katana (1975)

=== The Harker File novels ===
1. The Harker File (1976)
2. Dead and Paid For (1976)
3. They’ve Killed Anna (1977)
4. Kill the Reporter (1978)

=== Other novels ===
- Wellington's (1977)
- The Informant (1978)
- Poe Must Die (1978)
- Gossip (1979)
- Book of Shadows (1980)
- Choices (1980) (As Leslie Crafford)
- A Dangerous Glamour (1982)
- Giri (1982)
- The Unvanquished (1983) (As Terry Nelsen Bonner)
- Dai-sho (1983)
- Gaijin (1986)
- Oni (1987)
- Sword of Vengeance (1990)
- Kisaeng (1991)
- Krait (1992)
- Fear's Justice (1996)
- The Ghost (1999)

=== Non-fiction ===
- Angela Davis (1973)
- Cocaine (1973)
