= John Forster (musician) =

John Marshall Forster (born April 1, 1948) is an American cabaret musician, satirist, songwriter, composer, lyricist, and record producer. He has released several solo and collaborative albums, and has also worked on several revues and musicals.

== Career ==
=== Musicals and revues ===
Forster wrote the music and lyrics for the musical comedy special How to Eat Like a Child, based on the book of the same name by Delia Ephron, as well as those for the satirical revue A Good Swift Kick. He also founded the satirical revue "The Proposition" while an undergraduate at Harvard University which played in Cambridge, Massachusetts and in New York City. He also wrote the satirical revue "Both Barrels: A Salvo of John Forster Songs", which ran in Los Angeles and later in Chester, Connecticut in the late 1990s. For a musical adaptation of the immensely popular novel Freaky Friday by Mary Rodgers, he wrote the music and lyrics, with Mary Rodgers writing the book.

=== Solo career ===
In 1993, Forster released his debut album, Entering Marion, on Philo Records. People reviewed the album and described Forster as "a musical satirist who mixes social critique with a shot of wry." After hearing the album, Tom Lehrer, to whom Forster has often been compared, wrote that "You don't need me anymore, now you have John Forster to kick around." The album received an Indie Award honorable mention for best comedy album. In 1997, Forster released the album Helium, followed by The Official Bootleg Album in 1998.

=== Collaboration with Tom Chapin ===
Forster was nominated four times for Grammy Awards: the first for his work producing Tom Chapin's 1998 album In My Hometown as well as being nominated for three other Forster-Chapin albums. Together, Forster and Chapin co-wrote twelve albums for children and families. Family Tree also received recognition and awards from parent's magazines. Beginning in 1999, Forster began working on a collaborative album with Chapin. This album, entitled Broadsides: A Miscellany of Musical Opinion, was released in 2010.

== Discography ==
SOLO - writer / producer

- Entering Marion (Philo, 1993)
- Helium (Philo, 1997)
- The Official Bootleg Album (Limousine, 1998)

COLLABORATIONS - co-writer/co-producer

- Broadsides: A Miscellany of Musical Opinion (with Tom Chapin) (Sundance, 2010)
- " Family Tree" (Sony)
- "Moonboat" (Sony)
- "Mother Earth"(Sony)
