= Steven Kampmann =

American actor, writer, and director (born 1947)

- Born: May 31, 1947 (age 79); Philadelphia, Pennsylvania
- Occupations: Actor; director; and writer
- Years active: 1978–2012
- Known for: Kirk Devane on Newhart
- Spouse: Judith Kahan (m. 1981)
- Children: 4

Steven Kampmann (born May 31, 1947) is an American actor, writer, and director. He was born in Philadelphia, Pennsylvania. He may be best-known for his role as Kirk Devane on the first two seasons of Newhart.

Kampmann also had roles in The Rodney Dangerfield Show: It's Not Easy Bein' Me, L.A. Law, The Richest Cat in the World, Multiplicity, and Analyze That. Additionally, he was a writer for WKRP in Cincinnati. In 1981, he was nominated for a Primetime Emmy Award for Outstanding Comedy Series for his work on WKRP in Cincinnati. His screenplay credits include Clifford, Back to School, The Couch Trip and Stealing Home.

In 2012, Kampmann wrote and directed BuzzKill, a film about a struggling writer who becomes famous when a serial killer steals his car and the newest draft of his script.

== Family ==
Kampmann married actress and television writer Judith Kahan in 1981. They have four children, Christopher, Robert, William, and Michael.

== Writing credits ==
- WKRP in Cincinnati (1978–1982) (TV)
- SCTV (1981) (TV)
- The Rodney Dangerfield Show: It's Not Easy Bein' Me (1982) (TV)
- Back to School (with Harold Ramis, PJ Torokvei, and Will Porter) (1986)
- The Couch Trip (with Will Porter and Sean Stein) (1988)
- Stealing Home (1988) (with Will Porter) (1988) (also director)
- Clifford (1994) (credited as "Bobby von Hayes")
- Special Delivery (2000) (story only) (TV)
- BuzzKill (2012) (also director)

== Acting credits ==
- Newhart (1982–1984) (TV)
- The Rodney Dangerfield Show: It's Not Easy Bein' Me (1982) (TV)
- Rich Hall's Vanishing America (1986) (TV)
- The Richest Cat in the World (1986) (TV)
- Club Paradise (1986)
- A Tiger's Tale (1987)
- I, Martin Short, Goes Hollywood (1989) (TV)
- For the Boys (1991)
- L.A. Law (1992) (TV)
- Stuart Saves His Family (1995)
- Multiplicity (1996)
- Analyze That (2002)
