= Stealing Home =

1988 film by William Porter, Steven Kampmann

- Theatrical release poster
- Directed by: Steven Kampmann; William Porter (as Will Aldis)
- Written by: Steven Kampmann; William Porter (as Will Aldis)
- Produced by: Hank Moonjean; Thom Mount; Chana Ben-Dov (associate producer)
- Starring: Mark Harmon; Blair Brown; Jonathan Silverman; Harold Ramis; William McNamara; John Shea; Jodie Foster
- Cinematography: Bobby Byrne
- Edited by: Antony Gibbs
- Music by: David Foster
- Distributed by: Warner Bros. Pictures
- Release date: August 26, 1988
- Running time: 98 minutes
- Country: United States
- Language: English
- Box office: $7.46 million

Stealing Home is a 1988 American coming of age romantic drama film written and directed by Steven Kampmann and William Porter (billed as Will Aldis). The film stars Mark Harmon, Blair Brown, Jonathan Silverman, Harold Ramis, William McNamara, and Jodie Foster. The movie focuses on a failed baseball player, Billy Wyatt, who discovers that his childhood sweetheart, Katie Chandler, has died by suicide. Billy must confront the past via reminiscence and nostalgia, while also dealing with grief, as he embarks on a journey to fulfill one of Katie's last wishes; that he spread her ashes.

Stealing Home was released theatrically on August 26, 1988, by Warner Bros. Pictures. Upon release, the film was a critical and commercial failure, although David Foster's musical score garnered universal praise, the same for Jodie Foster's performance. The film has been praised by audiences for its melancholic and nostalgic themes, performances, and musical score.

== Plot ==
In the present, Billy Wyatt is a washed-up baseball player in his thirties, living in a hotel with a cocktail waitress. One afternoon, he receives a phone call from his mother, Ginny, informing him that his childhood babysitter and friend, Katie Chandler, has committed suicide. She also tells him that Katie left a will specifying that Billy is responsible for her ashes, claiming Billy was "the only one who would know what to do with them." Saddened and confused, Billy promises to come home that night.

Flashbacks to the 1960s show Billy and Katie's relationship. Katie was a slightly older girl who babysat Billy for the Wyatts, who were best friends with the Chandlers. Katie mentored Billy, giving him advice on girls and dating. As a birthday gift, she gave him a baseball pendant on a necklace to always remind him that he is a baseball player.

While Billy is still in high school, his father, Sam, dies in a car accident. Two months later, Katie, Billy, Ginny, and Billy's friend Alan Appleby decide to spend the Fourth of July week at the Chandlers' summer home, Seasmoke. During their vacation, Billy feels that Katie is encouraging his mother to move on too quickly, leading to a shouting match between them.

The next day at sunrise, Billy seeks Katie's forgiveness, and they spend the rest of the weekend together at Seasmoke. As the weekend comes to a close, Katie encourages Billy to pursue his passion for baseball. In the present, Billy remembers that this was the last time he saw her.

In the present, Katie's father, Hank, visits the Wyatt family to deliver Katie's ashes to Billy, who still has no idea what to do with them. Hank suggests a church service. Billy drives to Seasmoke to think and reminisce.

Billy reunites with Appleby, and they spend the night reminiscing and carousing while driving around in Katie's car with her ashes, trying to figure out what to do with them. Still unsure, Billy goes to Katie's parents' house to give them her ashes. While there, Billy recalls Katie telling him how she wanted to jump off the pier and fly free with the birds. Billy goes to the pier, runs down the dock, and scatters her ashes just as she described in her fantasy.

Billy joins a minor league baseball team, taking pride in grooming the field each morning before a game. The film ends with Billy stealing home, the same thing he did in his last game before his father died.

== Cast ==
- Mark Harmon as Billy Wyatt
  - William McNamara as young Billy Wyatt
  - Thacher Goodwin as Billy Wyatt (age 10)
- Harold Ramis as Alan Appleby
  - Jonathan Silverman as young Alan Appleby
- Blair Brown as Ginny Wyatt
- Richard Jenkins as Hank Chandler
- John Shea as Sam Wyatt
- Christine Jones as Grace Chandler
- Ted Ross as Bud Scott
- Helen Hunt as Hope Wyatt
- Beth Broderick as Lesley Jordan
- Jodie Foster as Katie Chandler

== Production ==
The film was mostly shot in the Philadelphia area and in New Jersey. Exterior scenes, as well as scenes of Billy's house and Alan Appleby's sporting goods store, were filmed in Chestnut Hill, Philadelphia. Carlton Academy scenes were filmed at Chestnut Hill Academy.

The interiors of Billy's childhood home were filmed in a house in Springfield, Pennsylvania. Scenes in Bob's Diner were filmed at Ridge Avenue in Roxborough.

Billy and Alan Appleby also sneak into and play baseball at Veterans Stadium in Philadelphia.

The opening scene and the closing scenes were shot at Fiscalini Field in San Bernardino, California, the home field of the minor-league San Bernardino Spirit. Mark Harmon was a part-owner of the Spirit at the time of filming, which led his character to be shown playing for that team.

== Soundtrack ==
No.	Title	Writer(s)	Artist	Length
1.	"Stealing Home"	David Foster	David Foster	3:35
2.	"Sherry"	Bob Gaudio	The Four Seasons	2:30
3.	"And When She Danced (Love Theme From Stealing Home)"	David Foster; Linda Thompson	David Foster & Marilyn Martin	3:50
4.	"Poison Ivy"	Jerry Leiber; Mike Stoller	The Nylons	3:21
5.	"All I Have To Do Is Dream"	Boudleaux Bryant	The Everly Brothers	2:20
6.	"Home Movies"	David Foster	David Foster	2:10
7.	"Great Balls Of Fire"	Otis Blackwell; Jack Hammer	Jerry Lee Lewis	1:50
8.	"Baby It's You"	Burt Bacharach; Mack David; Luther Dixon	The Shirelles	2:38
9.	"Stealing Home (Reprise)"	David Foster	David Foster	5:08
10.	"Bo Diddley"	Bo Diddley	Bo Diddley	2:19
11.	"Katie's Theme"	David Foster	David Foster	1:30
Total length:				31:11

== Reception ==
The film received negative reviews around the time of its release. In her review for The New York Times, Janet Maslin wrote, "The era is simply established as a dreamily idyllic past, thanks to sand dunes at twilight, waves that crash in the distance, shiny red convertibles without seat belts and a musical score that may make you want to weep, for all the wrong reasons". In his one-star review for the Chicago Sun-Times, Roger Ebert wrote, "I detested Stealing Home so much, from beginning to end, that I left the screening wondering if any movie could possibly be that bad". On Rotten Tomatoes the film has an approval rating of 18% based on reviews from 11 critics.

When asked about the film in 2006, Mark Harmon said, "That was about a bunch of actors loving a script, going there and burning it on both ends for five weeks just to get it done. That was a fun one to make. I hear a lot about that role. People really found that movie on video."

=== Summer of '42 ===
Ever since the release of Summer of '42, Warner Bros. has attempted to buy back the rights to the film, which they sold to author Herman Raucher in lieu of paying him a flat fee for the script on the belief that the film would not be financially successful. Stealing Home was greenlit shortly after Raucher denied their latest attempt to purchase the rights, leading to Summer star Jennifer O'Neill's assertion that Stealing Home was "stolen" from Summer. Regardless, she said that she enjoyed the film and called it a "lovely film." Rita Kempley, in her review for The Washington Post, also saw similarities with Summer, describing the film as a "pale comedy-drama by mediocrities Steven Kampmann and Will Aldis. Admittedly a pastiche of their memories, the movie bespeaks the dust of '60s yearbooks and greeting card sentiment. Of course, that stuff can be touching (Summer of '42) or quirky (Gregory's Girl), but here only allergy sufferers will leave with soggy Kleenex."

== See also ==
- List of American films of 1988
- List of baseball films
