= Georg Olden (graphic designer) =

African-American art director (1920–1975)

- Born: George Elliott Olden; November 13, 1920; Birmingham, Alabama, U.S.
- Died: February 25, 1975 (aged 54); Los Angeles, California, U.S.
- Education: Virginia State College
- Occupations: Graphic designer, ad man
- Spouses: Courtenaye MacBeth (m. 1941; div. 1966) Terri Phillips Baker (m. 1966)
- Partner: Irene Mikolajczyk
- Children: Marc Olden (stepson; 1933-2003); Georg Olden Jr.
- Relatives: Sylvia Olden Lee (sister)

Georg Olden (né George Elliott Olden; November 13, 1920 – February 25, 1975) was an American graphic designer who worked in television and advertising. Working at CBS, Olden helped to create the visual identities of shows such as Gunsmoke, I Love Lucy, and Lassie. In 1963, Olden became the first African-American to design a postage stamp, creating a design commemorating the centennial of the Emancipation Proclamation. Olden was an AIGA medal-winning graphic designer, and a Japanese magazine, Idea, once listed him among the top fifteen designers in the United States.

== Early life ==
George Elliot Olden was born to James Clarence Olden and Sylvia Ward Olden in Birmingham, Alabama, on November 13, 1920, as the grandson of a slave and the son of a Baptist preacher. Shortly after his birth, his family relocated to Washington, D.C., where his father served as minister to Plymouth Congregational Church. In 1933, after becoming increasingly politically active, Olden's father left his family to dedicate himself entirely to the civil rights movement. In youth he attended Dunbar High School in Washington, D.C., one of America's first public high schools for African American students, and then went on to study at Virginia State College.

== Career ==
Olden dropped out of college after the attack on Pearl Harbor to work as a graphic designer for the Office of Strategic Services (OSS), forerunner of the CIA. While working at the OSS, Olden published cartoons in National CIO News, The New Yorker, and Esquire and designed posters promoting wartime conservation efforts.

Olden worked for some of America's leading artists, designers and writers and made contacts that opened significant professional opportunities after the war. When the war ended in 1945, the head of the OSS communications division, Colonel Lawrence W. Lowman, who in civilian life became Vice President of CBS's television division, was searching for someone who "had a full grasp of the whole range of commercial-art techniques." He found Olden, and from a one-man operation involved with six programs a week, Olden eventually headed a staff of 14 in charge of 60 weekly shows. When he joined the network in 1945, there were 16,000 television sets in the entire nation. By the time he left the network in 1960, there were 85 million sets, one for every two Americans. During his time at OSS, Olden dropped the second "e" from his first name as a way to make himself more noticeable to magazine editors. Another possible motive for this spelling change was to hide his race by making his name appear German or Scandinavian.

From 1945 to 1960, Olden worked with William Golden, art director for CBS, and as such was one of the first African-Americans to work in television. At CBS, he was an ardent champion of contemporary art, commissioning on-air art and title cards by modern artists. "The door is open for artists on TV", he proclaimed in 1954. One example was the creation of the "truth teller" icon that was used during the 1956–1978 seasons of To Tell the Truth. In 1960, he began to work in advertising and went on to design the Clio Award as well as receive seven of them. That same year, he moved to BBDO as the TV group art supervisor. In 1963, he became the VP-senior art director at the major firm, McCann Erickson.

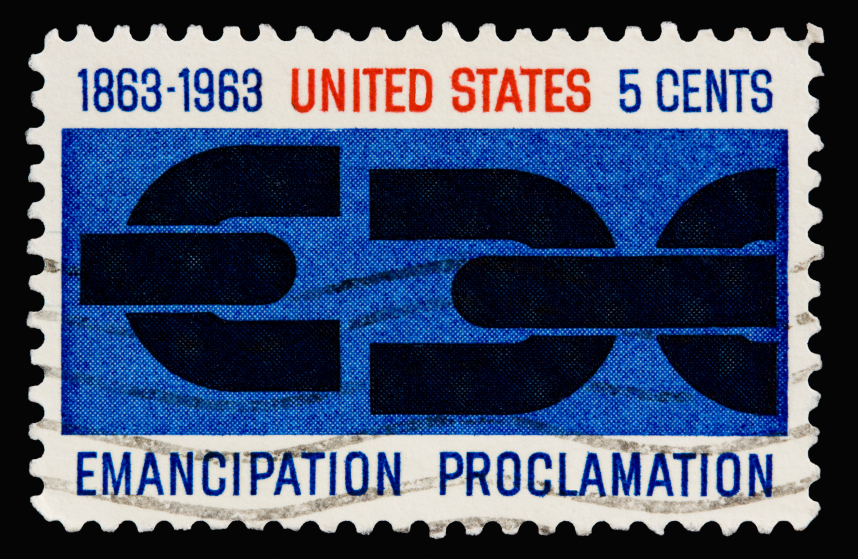
Georg Olden's 1963 Emancipation Proclamation commemorative stamp designed for the United States Postal Service.

In 1963, he became the first African-American to design a postage stamp for the United States Postal Service. The design commemorated the centennial of the declaration of the Emancipation Proclamation with a simple design of a broken chain in black on a blue background. He attended a White House ceremony where the stamp was introduced by President John F. Kennedy. In 1970, McCann Erickson laid him off with the reason being cited as the economic downturn of the time.

== Personal life ==
Olden married Courtenaye MacBeth in 1941 and divorced her in 1966, the same year he married his second wife, Terri Phillips Baker. He became estranged from Baker after his career declined and he began living with a new girlfriend, German-born Irene "Maya" Mikolajczyk. Olden was the father of Marc Olden and Georg Olden.

Olden has been said to have a mixed legacy in terms of race. Olden worked with the National Urban League and designed the organization's symbol, but despite his position at McCann Erickson, he tended to avoid pressing racial issues or pressing firms to hire blacks, saying acceptance into the industry is a matter of talent. In 1963, Olden told Ebony, "In my work I've never felt like a Negro. Maybe I've been lucky." However, in 1970, he sued his former employer, McCann Erickson, for wrongful termination caused by discrimination. He cited the dissolution of the Professional Advisory Council (PAC), of which he was a member, was a conscious decision to not allow him to move up in the company thereby keeping him at the level in which he joined the company. McCann argued that Olden never requested a transfer out of PAC into a position that would lead to greater promotion within the company. In 1972, the Equal Employment Opportunity Commission found reasonable cause that the company practiced discriminatory hiring but did not find reasonable cause on behalf of Olden.

After moving to Los Angeles, California, Olden started a class-action lawsuit against McCann Erickson for discrimination on behalf of himself and other black designers but was shot to death by live-in girlfriend Irene Mikolajczyk, who was arrested and tried a few days before the class action lawsuit was scheduled to begin. She pleaded not guilty and was acquitted in court.

== Awards ==
- Art Directors Club of New York medal, 1953
- Art Directors Club of New York medal, 1956
- Cannes Film Festival, Advertising prize, 1967
- Seven Clio Awards, 1962-1970
- AIGA Medal, 2007
