= Down to Earth (American TV series) =

- Genre: Sitcom
- Created by: Sam Harris; Bruce H. Newberg
- Starring: Carol Mansell; Stephen Johnson; Dick Sargent; David Kaufman; Kyle Richards; Randy Josselyn; Marla Rubinoff; Lester Fletcher; Ronnie Schell; Michael Delano; Rip Taylor
- Composer: Tom Wells
- Country of origin: United States
- Original language: English
- No. of seasons: 7
- No. of episodes: 106

Production
- Executive producer: Arthur Annecharico
- Producers: Jerry Brown; Rick Miner
- Running time: 22 mins.
- Production companies: Arthur Company; Procter & Gamble

Original release
- Network: WTBS
- Release: March 10, 1984 – 1987

Down to Earth is an American fantasy sitcom series that ran on Superstation WTBS from March 10, 1984, to 1987. The series was originally produced by The Arthur Company, and later, by Procter & Gamble Productions and was the Superstation's first original series.

== Premise ==
The series revolved around Ethel MacDoogan (Carol Mansell), a free-spirited woman who lived the "Roaring 1920s" era. However, in 1925 she suffered a fatal accident, colliding with a trolley. Ethel waits in Heaven for 60 years for a chance to earn her wings, until finally she is sent to earth in the 1980s to help the Preston family.

The Prestons are a typical modern-day American family with modern-day situations: widowed father Richard (Stephen Johnson, then Dick Sargent) is a realtor, though he retired a few months after and began working as a licensing agent for new inventors; older son Duane (David Kaufman) is very class-conscious; teenage daughter Lissy (Kyle Richards) is very opinionated; Jay Jay (Randy Josselyn), the youngest, just wants someone who can fill their late mother's void. It is Jay Jay's prayer for an angel to come into their lives that summons Ethel, and he is the only one who knows her true identity.

Infiltrating the household as housekeeper and maid, Ethel is unsurprisingly clueless about even the simplest conveniences of modern-day 1980s family life. Jay Jay helps cover for her when it comes to adapting to the newfangled inventions of the past 60 years, and she eventually wins over the Prestons by successfully helping them deal with their problems.

Popping in from time to time is the Prestons' ditsy next-door neighbor Candy Carlysle (Marla Rubinoff), who became a regular character in 1985.

In addition to her earthly employer, Ethel is under the constant eye of her heavenly boss and their successors, who watch her every move—and her every mistake. Her first overseer, Mr. Divine (Lester Fletcher), kept a close eye on her. He was moved to another position in Heaven a few months after, and the very concerned but comical Lester Luster (Ronnie Schell) took over, followed by her ex-fiancé/con-man Jake (Michael DeLano), with the outrageous Stanley McCloud (Rip Taylor) taking over in the show's final years.

A few months after the show's beginning, a turning point occurred: Ethel's mission on Earth proved successful and she was ordered back to Heaven. Realizing how much the Prestons meant to her and vice versa, she begged Lester Luster to postpone her return to Heaven. Together, they created a deal that she would help him with any crises on Earth that he brought to her attention and that she would have to return to Heaven if she was unsuccessful.

== Production notes ==
The series made several changes to its cast. Besides the ethereal bosses, it changed the earthly father as well, becoming the second series in which Dick Sargent replaced another actor in the same role.

The show's central characters were jointly created, and the core format was jointly developed, by Sam Harris, who collaborated with Arthur L. Annecharico to do so. Harris also wrote several episodes of the show.

In addition to having run on WTBS, Down to Earth also had subsequent runs on Good Life TV.

== Reception ==
The Ocala Star-Banner called Down to Earth "one of the better sitcoms on the air nowadays".

== Cast ==
Season 3 main cast of Down to Earth (l–r) Kyle Richards, Dick Sargent, Carol Mansell, David Kaufman, Randy Josselyn and Marla Jeanette Rubinoff.

Actor	Character
Carol Mansell	Ethel MacDoogan
Stephen Johnson	Richard Preston, 1984
Dick Sargent	Richard Preston, 1984–87
David Kaufman	Duane Preston
Kyle Richards	Lissy Preston
Randy Josselyn	Jay Jay Preston
Marla Rubinoff	Candy Carlysle, 1985–87
Lester Fletcher	Mr. Divine, 1984
Ronnie Schell	Lester Luster, 1984–85
Michael DeLano	Jake Fiore, 1985–86
Rip Taylor	Stanley McCloud, 1985–87
Annie Golden	Starr Gardner, 1986

== Episodes ==
=== Season 1 (1984) ===
No. overall	No. in season	Title	Directed by	Written by	Original release date
1	1	"Happy Birthday to Me"	John Tracy	Sam Harris & Bruce H. Newberg	March 10, 1984
2	2	"Make Mine Murder"	John Tracy	Sam Harris & Bruce H. Newberg	March 17, 1984
3	3	"Back to Basics"	Unknown	Sam Harris & Bruce H. Newberg	March 24, 1984
4	4	"Food for Thought"	John Tracy	Sam Harris & Bruce H. Newberg	April 4, 1984
5	5	"Everything Old is New Again"	John Tracy	Sam Harris & Bruce H. Newberg	April 11, 1984
6	6	"A View from Above"	John Tracy	Sam Harris & Bruce H. Newberg	April 18, 1984
7	7	"Duane for President"	John Tracy	Sam Harris & Bruce H. Newberg	April 25, 1984
8	8	"Aunt Roz"	John Tracy	Sam Harris & Bruce H. Newberg	May 2, 1984
9	9	"For Better, For Worse"	John Tracy	Sam Harris & Bruce H. Newberg	May 9, 1984
10	10	"Romance and Real Estate"	John Tracy	Sam Harris & Bruce H. Newberg	May 16, 1984
11	11	"Rejuvenation of Richard"	John Tracy	Sam Harris & Bruce H. Newberg	May 23, 1984
12	12	"Practical Jokes"	John Tracy	Sam Harris & Bruce H. Newberg	June 1, 1984
13	13	"Selling the House"	John Tracy	Sam Harris & Bruce H. Newberg	June 8, 1984

=== Season 2 (1984–85) ===
No. overall	No. in season	Title	Directed by	Written by	Original release date
14	1	"Heaven Can Wait"	Doug Rogers	Bruce H. Newberg	September 15, 1984
15	2	"The Kazinsky Krunch"	Doug Rogers	Robert Bruce & Marty Weiss	September 29, 1984
16	3	"Gone with the Wind"	John Tracy	Roger Garrett	October 15, 1984
17	4	"The Buck Stops Here"	Doug Rogers	Stephanie Anderson & Jon S. Denny	October 29, 1984
18	5	"The Ball's in Your Court"	Unknown	Robert Bruce & Marty Weiss	November 10, 1984
19	6	"In Praise of Older Women"	Doug Rogers	Barry Rubinowitz	November 17, 1984
20	7	"Jay Jay's Dream"	Alan Bergmann	William Bickley & Michael Warren	November 24, 1984
21	8	"Uncle Roscoe's Watch"	Alan Bergmann	Sam Greenbaum	December 16, 1984
22	9	"Luster Gets Stuck"	Alan Bergmann	George Hampton & Mike Moore	December 30, 1984
23	10	"Ethel's Memory Loss"	Gary Shimokawa	George Hampton & Mike Moore	January 2, 1985
24	11	"The Bully"	Mel Ferber	Richard Freiman	January 9, 1985
25	12	"The Quiz Show"	Lee Shallat-Chemel	Roger Garrett	January 16, 1985
26	13	"A Valentine for Valentino"	Bob Claver	Charlotte Dobbs	January 23, 1985

=== Season 3 (1985) ===
No. overall	No. in season	Title	Directed by	Written by	Original release date
27	1	"The Russian Defector"	Unknown	Unknown	February 1, 1985
28	2	"Eskimo Shoes"	Unknown	Unknown	February 8, 1985
29	3	"Art or Bust"	Alan Bergmann	Bruce H. Newberg	February 15, 1985
30	4	"Epidemic"	Mel Ferber	Bruce H. Newberg & Bruce Kane	February 22, 1985
31	5	"Obsolete Ethel"	Mel Ferber	George Hampton & Mike Moore	February 1985
32	6	"Name, Rank and Social Security Number"	Unknown	Unknown	March 3, 1985
33	7	"Duane's Car"	Mel Ferber	Story by : Charlotte Dobbs; Teleplay by : Warren Murray	March 10, 1985
34	8	"House Arrest"	Mel Ferber	Bill Taub	March 17, 1985
35	9	"Lost and Found"	Doug Rogers	David Ketchum & Tony DiMarco	April 1, 1985
36	10	"The Radio Show"	Don Barnhart	Robert Bruce & Marty Weiss	April 8, 1985
37	11	"Future Shock"	Unknown	Unknown	April 15, 1985
38	12	"Remember When"	Unknown	George Hampton & Mike Moore	April 22, 1985
39	13	"The Lissy Caper"	Unknown	Unknown	April 29, 1985
40	14	"Luster/Jake Special"	Unknown	Unknown	May 6, 1985
41	15	"Romeo and Juliet"	Russ Petranto	Stephanie Anderson & Jon S. Denny	May 13, 1985
42	16	"A Star is Born"	Don Barnhart	Jim Rogers	May 20, 1985
43	17	"Trading Places"	Unknown	Unknown	May 27, 1985

=== Season 4 ===
No. overall	No. in season	Title	Directed by	Written by	Original release date
44	1	"Real Candy"	TBD	TBD	1985
45	2	"A Touch of Ethel"	TBD	TBD	1985
46	3	"Play It Again, Ethel"	TBD	TBD	1985
47	4	"Taking Stock"	TBD	TBD	1985
48	5	"Frozen Rope"	TBD	TBD	1985
49	6	"Hypnotic Ethel"	TBD	TBD	1985
50	7	"Angelbusters"	TBD	TBD	1985
51	8	"Chucky Chipmunk"	TBD	TBD	1985
52	9	"The Dentist Show"	TBD	TBD	1985
53	10	"Knight in Heavenly Armor"	TBD	TBD	1985
54	11	"Money, Money"	TBD	TBD	1985
55	12	"The Dummy Show"	TBD	TBD	1985
56	13	"He Ain't Bozo, He's My Brother"	TBD	TBD	1985
57	14	"Duane's Dilemma"	TBD	TBD	1985
58	15	"Lusterado"	TBD	TBD	1985
59	16	"The Burro"	TBD	TBD	1985
60	17	"The Bag Lady"	Lee Lochhead	Harry Cauley	1985
61	18	"Easy Rider"	TBD	TBD	1985
62	19	"Rear Window"	TBD	TBD	1985
63	20	"Scenes from a Marriage"	TBD	TBD	1985
64	21	"Perfect Match"	Howard Storm	Richard Miner & Joel Parks	1985
65	22	"Goodness Flakes"	TBD	TBD	1985
66	23	"Lissy's Mother"	TBD	TBD	1985
67	24	"Christmas Story"	Don Barnhart	Karl Epstein & Marvin Braverman	1985

=== Season 5 (1986) ===
No. overall	No. in season	Title	Directed by	Written by	Original release date
68	1	"The Inferior Decorator"	TBD	TBD	1986
69	2	"Duane Takes a Wife"	TBD	TBD	1986
70	3	"Stewed Ethel"	TBD	TBD	1986
71	4	"The Russians Are...Here"	Unknown	Unknown	March 11, 1986
72	5	"The Big Freeze"	TBD	TBD	1986
73	6	"Sixteen Candles"	TBD	TBD	1986
74	7	"Billie Jean is Not My Sitter"	TBD	TBD	1986
75	8	"Angel Flu"	TBD	TBD	1986
76	9	"Wish I May, Wish I Might"	TBD	TBD	1986
77	10	"One Flew Over the Prestons' Nest"	TBD	TBD	1986
78	11	"Amelia Earhart's Diary"	TBD	TBD	1986
79	12	"Bird of Paradise"	TBD	TBD	1986
80	13	"Comet Night Fever"	TBD	TBD	1986

=== Season 6 (1986) ===
No. overall	No. in season	Title	Directed by	Written by	Original release date
81	1	"Peter Doesn't Live Here Anymore"	TBD	TBD	1986
82	2	"Rich Man, Poor Man"	TBD	TBD	1986
83	3	"Duane's Basic Training"	Unknown	Unknown	September 1, 1986
84	4	"Princess Lissy"	TBD	TBD	1986
85	5	"Rites of Passage"	TBD	TBD	1986
86	6	"Comically Yours"	Don Barnhart	Earl Kress	1986
87	7	"Mama the Matchmaker"	TBD	TBD	1986
88	8	"Saving Face"	TBD	TBD	1986
89	9	"Requiem for a Paperweight"	TBD	TBD	1986
90	10	"Caught in the Act"	TBD	TBD	1986
91	11	"Cindy's Fella"	TBD	TBD	1986
92	12	"Double Trouble"	TBD	TBD	1986
93	13	"Duane Moves Out"	TBD	TBD	1986

=== Season 7 (1987) ===
No. overall	No. in season	Title	Directed by	Written by	Original release date
94	1	"Lissy's Secret Garden"	TBD	TBD	1987
95	2	"Angel of the Year"	TBD	TBD	1987
96	3	"Candy Gets a Job"	TBD	TBD	1987
97	4	"Educating Ethel"	TBD	TBD	1987
98	5	"As Lovely as a Tree"	TBD	TBD	1987
99	6	"Cruise: Part 1"	TBD	TBD	1987
100	7	"Cruise: Part 2"	TBD	TBD	1987
101	8	"Starrstruck"	TBD	TBD	1987
102	9	"Mama in Love"	TBD	TBD	1987
103	10	"I Love Lissy"	TBD	TBD	1987
104	11	"Invitation to the Dance"	TBD	TBD	1987
105	12	"Old with the Old"	TBD	TBD	1987
106	13	"Jay Jay's Birthday"	TBD	TBD	1987

== Crew ==
- Executive Producer: Arthur Annecharico
- Producer: Rick Miner
