= Georg Olden (actor) =

American actor

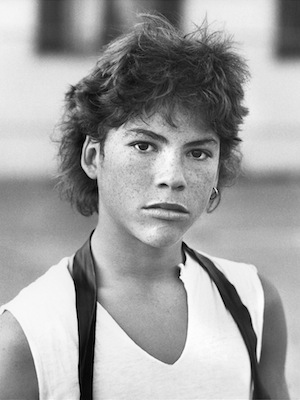
- Georg Olden, c. 1982
- Born: January 14, 1968 (age 58); Tarrytown, New York, U.S.A.
- Occupations: Actor, model, musical performer
- Years active: 1981–2005

Georg Olden (born January 14, 1968) is a retired American actor, model and musical theatre performer. Beginning his career as a professional child actor and model at the age of ten, Olden is best known for his television roles; as "Drag" in the ABC Weekend Special: The Joke's On Mr. Little and as "Robbie Stuart" on the 1980s TBS sitcom Rocky Road. Rising to prominence as a teen idol in the mid-1980s, Olden is also known for his feature film roles: as "Piper" in the teen comedy Bad Manners (aka: Growing Pains) and as one of the teenage bullies in the science fiction adventure Explorers.

== Early life ==
Olden was born Georg Olden Jr. on January 14, 1968, in Tarrytown, New York, the son of renowned graphic designer Georg Olden and professional stage actress and singer Terri Phillips Baker. His father died when he was seven and he grew up spending his summers traveling the country with his mother as she appeared in numerous roadshow engagements and stage plays. In a 1986 interview, Olden recounted his early childhood saying "I think we ended up seeing just about all of the U.S.A. except Alaska and Hawaii." Although an accomplished stage performer, Baker did not want her son to enter show business and discouraged him from embarking on a career within the entertainment industry.

== Career ==
=== Early career ===
In 1978, at the age of ten, Olden heard about a local theatrical production of the musical Oliver! that was looking for boys. He asked his mother to allow him to audition. In spite of some misgivings she eventually consented on the condition that if he didn't get the role he would agree not to pursue a career in show business. If he did get the part, she would accept it as fate and would allow him to pursue an acting career. After a series of auditions to evaluate his acting, singing and dancing abilities, Olden landed the title role and immediately began rehearsals for a full-scale production of the musical at the famed Aquarius Theatre in Hollywood, which co-starred comic Dick Shawn.

Over the next several years, Olden continued to work as a child actor and model, appearing in numerous national commercials and print advertorials until making the transition to television in 1981 with a guest-starring role on the situation comedy Flo. On September 22, 1981, Olden appeared in the NBC musical-comedy special How to Eat Like a Child – And Other Lessons in Not Being a Grown-up, based on the best-selling book by Delia Ephron. In the satirical special, Olden appeared opposite Dick Van Dyke (as the token "grown-up"), as well as other future child stars Corey Feldman and Billy Jacoby. In his review of the special, Baltimore Sun television critic, Bill Carter singled Olden out, writing "The main kid, called George in the show, has a kind of chip-on-the-shoulder mien; but he sings as sweetly as a choirboy.

On February 6, 1982, Olden appeared in his first starring role in ABC's popular Saturday morning anthology series, The ABC Weekend Special. In the special episode titled The Joke's On Mr. Little, Olden starred as "Drag", a mischievous boy who, disappointed when his beloved teacher moves away and is replaced by the refined Mr. Lester Little (Richard Sanders), begins to plot with his best friend "Streeter" (K. C. Martel) to target the new teacher for a series of embarrassing practical jokes, only to ultimately learn a "valuable lesson" about himself. Later that same year, Olden followed up with guest-starring television roles, appearing on the daytime soap opera General Hospital and an episode of Little House on the Prairie titled He Was Only Twelve.

=== Teen idol ===
In May 1983, Olden made his feature film debut with a small, but memorable role in the action-adventure drama, Breathless. In the film, Olden played a young skateboarder who debates the merits of the Silver Surfer with Jesse Lujack (Richard Gere) at a news-stand on the streets of Los Angeles. In November of that same year, Olden had a small role in the CBS tear-jerker Two Kinds of Love. In the television drama, Olden played Jonas, a bully who antagonizes the film's lead (Ricky Schroder) as he struggles to cope with a troublesome family life.

In October 1984, Olden starred in the teen comedy Bad Manners (aka: Growing Pains). Set in an orphanage called "The Home of the Bleeding Heart", Olden played "Piper", the ring-leader of a group of teenage delinquents who escape from their oppressive orphanage to rescue a fellow "inmate", irreverently wreaking havoc on suburbia every step along the way. While not impressed with what he deemed to be a cynical and contrived storyline, Boston Phoenix critic Owen Gleiberman praised Olden as one of the film's young stand-out stars, writing – "Georg Olden has a charisma and physical grace far beyond his years [...] a scampish, freckle-faced punk with the eyes of a lynx and the smile of a future matinee idol."

In December 1984, Olden appeared in the gangster spoof comedy film, Johnny Dangerously, portraying a young Joe Piscopo. In July 1985, he was once again cast as the "bully" in Joe Dante's science fiction fantasy adventure Explorers. In the film, Olden played one in a gang of teenage boys led by Steve Jackson (Bobby Fite) who torment the film's protagonists, Ben Crandall (Ethan Hawke) and Wolfgang Müller (River Phoenix). While not considered a commercial success at the time, the film was the feature film debut of both Hawke and Phoenix, and has become something of a cult favorite among fans of 80s sci-fi cinema.

On September 2, 1985, Olden debuted in his co-starring role on the WTBS situation comedy Rocky Road. On the series, Olden played Robbie Stuart, a typical "girl crazy" teenager who, along with his two sisters, inherits an ice cream parlor on the Pismo Beach boardwalk from his recently deceased parents. Filmed in Hollywood, the series launched Olden as a popular teen idol of the day, with pinups and articles appearing in numerous teen magazines such as Tiger Beat, Teen Beat and 16 Magazine among others. In July 1986, Teen Idol Mania! described Olden when introducing him to their readers – "'Gorgeous Georg' Olden, the boy with the incredible, edible eyes." Rocky Road ran for three seasons and Olden earned two Youth in Film Award nominations for his work on the series.

=== Later career ===
After Rocky Road ended, Olden continued to make occasional guest-starring appearances on television. In October 1987, he appeared in an episode of Highway to Heaven titled I Was a Middle Aged Werewolf and in 1990, he made two appearances on the critically acclaimed teen medical drama Doogie Howser, M.D.. In 1994, Olden once again appeared with Ricky Schroder, this time as "Lou" in the dramatic television movie To My Daughter with Love. In 2005, after more than 10 years out of show business, Olden returned to acting with a small role as Devan Burnett in the teen buddy comedy Suits on the Loose.

== Personal life ==
While working as a professional actor, Olden attended Beverly Hills High School, beginning in 1982 and graduating in 1986. After leaving show business, Olden left Hollywood and moved to the Dallas–Fort Worth area working as a real-estate agent at Coldwell Banker Residential Brokerage where his specialties included home marketing, buyer representation, and investor strategies. As of 2011, Olden continued to work in real estate and was living in the Bend, Oregon, area.

== Filmography ==
Film
Year	Film	Role	Notes
1983	Breathless	"Kid"	—
1984	Bad Manners	Piper	aka: Growing Pains
1984	Johnny Dangerously	"Young Vermin"	—
1985	Explorers	"Steve Jackson's Gang Member"	—
2005	Suits on the Loose	Devan Burnett	—
Television
Year	Film	Role	Notes
1981	How to Eat Like a Child	"Himself"	TV special
1982	ABC Weekend Special	Drag	"The Joke's on Mr. Little"
1982	General Hospital	(Unknown)	(Unknown episodes)
1982	Little House on the Prairie	Danny	"He Was Only Twelve: Part 1"
1983	Two Kinds of Love	Jonas	TV movie
1985	Rocky Road	Robbie Stuart	3 seasons / 71 episodes
1987	Highway to Heaven	Sid	"I Was a Middle Aged Werewolf"
1990	Doogie Howser, M.D.	Brad / Marshall's Friend	2 episodes
1994	To My Daughter With Love	Lou	TV movie

== Awards ==
Year	Award	Category	Project	Result	Ref.
1986	Youth in Film Award (now known as the Young Artist Award)	Best Young Actor in a Cable Series or Special	Rocky Road	Nominated	
1987	Youth in Film Award (now known as the Young Artist Award)	Best Young Actor in a Cable Series or Special	Rocky Road	Nominated	
