= Don Barnhart =

American comedian

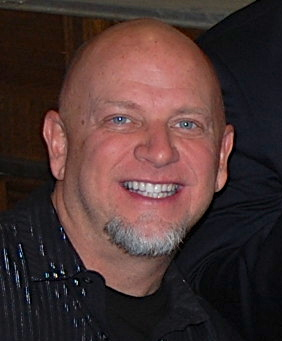
- Barnhart in 2014
- Born: Donald Lewis Barnhart, Jr. July 2, 1963 (age 63)
- Website: http://www.donbarnhart.com

Donald Lewis Barnhart, Jr. (born July 2, 1963) is an American comedian, actor, writer and filmmaker who stars in his own nightly comedy show in Las Vegas author, actor, filmmaker and hypnotist. Barnhart just released his new Dry Bar Comedy Special "The Spinal Disintegration of Man" from VidAngel which is going viral and has his own nightly residency in Las Vegas.

Barnhart also stars in the documentary I Am Battle Comic, about the importance of entertaining the troops around the world and was the inspiration for the movie. He directed, produced and stars in Jokesters TV, The Freedom of Speech Comedy Series, The Ice House Anniversary Show, The DeEvolution of Man, Class Clowns, China Dolls and more. Barnhart appears in Tribute to Fluffy, plays a psychotic mad man in Max Justice and appeared in the indie film Vicious Lips. He even supported his rise in comedy by doing background work on Apollo 13, In The Army Now and Friends.

Barnhart's is a comedian and when he's not on tour, Don has his own nightly show in Las Vegas at The OYO Hotel & Casino. He stars in the new sitcom, Class Clowns and the upcoming film Reefer Rendum. His first credits were during the comedy boom of the 80s appearing in MTV's 1/2 Hour Comedy Hour, An Evening at The Improv and Star Search. He is also a Certified Hypnotist and published author and founder of The Las Vegas Comedy Institute where he teaches stand up, improv and comedy writing to the next generation of comedy stars.

He also stars in Finding The Funny, the documentary on teaching stand-up comedy directed by John Bizarre.
