= List of situation comedies =

This is a list of television and radio sitcoms.

== 0–9 ==
Title	Country	Years
The 10%ers	United Kingdom	1993–1996
10 Things I Hate About You	United States	2009–2010
100 Deeds for Eddie McDowd	United States	1999–2002
100 Questions	United States	2010
13 Queens Boulevard	United States	1979
15 Storeys High	United Kingdom	2002–2004
1600 Penn	United States	2013
18 to Life	Canada (2 seasons) and United States (1 season)	2010–2011
2 Broke Girls	United States	2011–2017
2 Nuts and a Richard!	Canada	2015–2017
227	United States	1985–1990
2point4 Children	United Kingdom	1991–1999
3-South	United States	2002–2003
30 Rock	United States	2006–2013; 2020 (special)
31 Minutos	Chile	2003–2005; 2014
3rd Rock from the Sun	United States	1996–2001
4 O'Clock Club	United Kingdom	2012–2020
The 5 Mrs. Buchanans	United States	1994–1995
6teen	Canada	2004–2010
7 vidas	Spain	1999–2006
704 Hauser	United States	1994
8 Simple Rules	United States	2002–2005
90 Bristol Court	United States	1964–1965
9JKL	United States	2017–2018

== A ==
Title	Country	Years
A1 Ko Sa 'Yo	Philippines	2016
A Diarista	Brazil	2003–2007
A Grande Família	Brazil	2001–2014
A Grande Família (1972)	Brazil	1972–1975
A J Wentworth, BA	United Kingdom	1982
A to Z	United States	2014–2015
A.E.S. Hudson Street	United States	1978
a.k.a. Pablo	United States	1984
Aangan Terha	Pakistan	1984
Abangan Ang Susunod Na Kabanata	Philippines	1991–1997
The Abbey	United Kingdom	2007
The Abbott and Costello Show	United States	1952–1954
Abby	United States	2003
Abby's	United States	2019
A Bear's Tail	United Kingdom	2005
Abigail and Roger	United Kingdom	1956
A Bit of a Do	United Kingdom	1989
Abbott Elementary	United States	2021–
About a Boy	United States	2014–2015
About Face	United Kingdom	1989–1991
Absolutely Fabulous	United Kingdom	1992–1995; 1996; 2001–2004; 2011–2012
Absolute Power	United Kingdom	2003–2005
Accidental Family	United States	1967–1968
Accidentally on Purpose	United States	2009–2010
According to Bex	United Kingdom	2005
According to Jim	United States	2001–2009
Ace Crawford, Private Eye	United States	1983
Ace Ventura: Pet Detective	United States/Canada	1995–2000
A Class by Himself	United Kingdom	1971–1972
Acropolis Now	Australia	1989–1992
Adam's Family Tree	United Kingdom	1997–1999
Adam's Rib	United States	1973
The Addams Family	United States	1964–1966
The Adventures of Aggie	United Kingdom	1956–1957
The Adventures of Brigadier Wellington-Bull	United Kingdom	1959
The Adventures of Hiram Holliday	United States	1956–1957
The Adventures of Francie and Josie	United Kingdom	1962–1965
The Adventures of Lano and Woodley	Australia	1997–1999
The Adventures of Ozzie and Harriet	United States	1952–1966
The Adventures of Pete & Pete	United States	1993–1996
The Adventures of Tugboat Annie	United Kingdom	1958
Affairs of the Heart	United Kingdom	1985
A Fine Romance	United Kingdom	1981–1984
After Henry (radio series)	United Kingdom	1985–1989
After Henry	United Kingdom	1988–1992
After Hours	United Kingdom	2015
AfterMASH	United States	1983–1985
After You've Gone	United Kingdom	2007–2008
A Gentleman's Club	United Kingdom	1988
Agent Elvis	United States	2023
Agent Z and the Penguin from Mars	United Kingdom	1996
Agony	United Kingdom	1979–1981
Agony Again	United Kingdom	1995
Aída	Spain	2005–2014
Ain't Misbehavin'	United Kingdom	1994–1995
The Airbase	United Kingdom	1965
Airwaves	Canada	1985–1987
Albert and Victoria	United Kingdom	1970–1971
Alcock and Gander	United Kingdom	1972
The Aldrich Family	United States	1939–1953
Alexander the Greatest	United Kingdom	1971–1972
Alex, Inc.	United States	2018
ALF	United States	1986–1990
Alice	United States	1976–1985
Aliens in America	United States	2007–2008
Aliens in the Family	United States	1996
Alif Noon	Pakistan	1965–1982
A Little Bit of Wisdom	United Kingdom	1974–1976
All About Me	United Kingdom	2002–2004
All About the Andersons	United States	2003–2004
All About the Washingtons	United States	2018
All About Us	United States	2001
All Along the Watchtower	United Kingdom	1999
All-American Girl	United States	1994–1995
All at No 20	United Kingdom	1986–1987
All at Sea	United Kingdom	2013–2015
All Gas and Gaiters	United Kingdom	1966–1971
All in Good Faith	United Kingdom	1985–1988
All in the Family	United States	1971–1979
All Night Long	United Kingdom	1994
All of Us	United States	2003–2007
All Our Saturdays	United Kingdom	1973
All's Fair	United States	1976–1977
All That Glitters	United States	1977
All Together Now	Australia	1991–1993
Allen Gregory	United States	2011
'Allo 'Allo!	United Kingdom	1982–1992
Almost Home	United States	1991–1993
Almost Perfect	United States	1995–1996
Alright Already	United States	1997–1998
The Alvin Show	United States	1961–1962
Amanda's	United States	1983
Amen	United States	1986–1991
America 2-Night	United States	1977–1978
American Dad!	United States	2005–
American Dreamer	United States	1990–1991
American Housewife	United States	2016–2021
Amos 'n' Andy	United States	1951–1953
An Actor's Life For Me	United Kingdom	1991
An American in Canada	Canada	2002–2004
...And Mother Makes Five	United Kingdom	1974–1976
...And Mother Makes Three	United Kingdom	1971–1973
Andy Barker, P.I.	United States	2007
Andy Capp	United Kingdom	1988
The Andy Griffith Show	United States	1960–1968
Andy Richter Controls the Universe	United States	2002–2003
Angelo's	United Kingdom	2007
Anger Management	United States	2012–2014
Angie	United States	1979–1980
Angie Tribeca	United States	2016–2018
Angry Boys	Australia	2011
Animal Practice	United States	2012
Anke	Germany	1999–2001
Ann Jillian	United States	1989–1990
The Ann Sothern Show	United States	1958–1961
Anna and the King	United States	1972
Annie McGuire	United States	1988
Another Day	United States	1978
A.N.T. Farm	United States	2011–2014
Anything But Love	United States	1989–1990
A.P. Bio	United States	2018–2021
Aparadektoi, Oi	Greece	1990–1992
Apartment 2F	United States	1997
Apna Tou Style Yehi Hai	Pakistan	2018
Aqua Teen Hunger Force	United States	2000–2015; 2023
Aquí no hay quien viva	Spain	2003–2006
Aquí no hay quien viva	Colombia	2008–2009
Archer	United States	2009–2023
Archie Bunker's Place	United States	1979–1983
Are You Being Served?	United Kingdom	1972–1985
Are You Being Served? (Australian TV series)	Australia	1980–1981
Are You There, Chelsea?	United States	2012
Arli$$	United States	1996–2002
The Army Game	United Kingdom	1956–1961
The Army Show	United States	1998
Arnie	United States	1970–1972
Arrested Development	United States	2003–2006; 2013–2019
Arresting Behavior	United States	1992
Arsenio	United States	1997
The Artful Dodger	United Kingdom	1959
The Arthur Askey Show	United Kingdom	1961
Arthur's Treasured Volumes	United Kingdom	1960
As Good Cooks Go	United Kingdom	1969–1970
Ask Harriet	United States	1998
The Associates	United States	1979–1980
As Time Goes By	United Kingdom	1992–2002
Assy McGee	United States	2006–2008
Astronauts	United Kingdom	1981–1983
Asylum (1996 TV series)	United Kingdom	1996
Asylum (2015 TV series)	United Kingdom	2015
Atashin'chi	Japan	2002–2009
At Ease	United States	1983
Atlantis High	United Kingdom	2001–2002
Atletico Partick	United Kingdom	1995–1996
Attention Scum	United Kingdom	2001
A.U.S.A.	United States	2003
Austin & Ally	United States	2011–2016
The Autocrats	Finland	2001–2008
Avrupa Yakası	Turkey	2004–2009
The Awesomes	United States	2013–2015
Awkward	United States	2011–2016
Awkwafina Is Nora from Queens	United States	2020–2023

== B ==
Title	Country	Years
B-And-B	United Kingdom	1968
B. J. and the Bear	United States	1979–1981
B Positive	United States	2020–2022
Babes	United States	1990–1991
Babes in the Wood	United Kingdom	1998–1999
Baby Blues	United States	2000
Baby Bob	United States	2002–2003
Baby Boom	United States	1988–1989
Baby Daddy	United States	2012–2017
Baby, I'm Back	United States	1978
Baby Makes Five	United States	1983
Baby Talk	United States	1991–1992
Bachelor Father (American TV series)	United States	1957–1962
Bachelor Father (British TV series)	United Kingdom	1970–1971
Back	United Kingdom	2017–2021
Backs to the Land	United Kingdom	1977–1978
Back to You	United States	2007–2008
Bad Boyes	United Kingdom	1987–1988
Baddiel's Syndrome	United Kingdom	2001
Bad Education	United Kingdom	2012–2014
The Bad Girl's Guide	United States	2005
Bad Judge	United States	2014–2015
Bad Move	United Kingdom	2017–2018
The Bad News Bears	United States	1979–1980
Badults	United Kingdom	2013–2014
The Baileys of Balboa	United States	1964–1965
Baker's Dozen	United States	1982
Bakersfield P.D.	United States	1993–1994
The Baldy Man	United Kingdom	1995–1998
Ballmastrz: 9009	United States	2018–2020
Ballot Monkeys	United Kingdom	2015
Barbara	United Kingdom	1999–2003
Barefoot in the Park	United States	1970–1971
Barmy Aunt Boomerang	United Kingdom	1999–2000
Barney Miller	United States	1975–1982
The Basil Brush Show	United Kingdom	2002–2007
Battery Park	United States	2000
The Baxters	United States	1979–1981
Bear Behaving Badly	United Kingdom	2007–2010
Beast	United Kingdom	2000–2001
Beautiful People	United Kingdom	2008–2009
Beaver Falls	United Kingdom	2011–2012
Beavis and Butt-Head	United States	1993–1997; 2011; 2022–2023; 2025–
Becker	United States	1998–2004
Bedsitcom	United Kingdom	2003
The Bed-Sit Girl	United Kingdom	1965–1966
Bedtime	United Kingdom	2001–2003
Beggar My Neighbour	United Kingdom	1966–1968
Be Home for Dinner	Hong Kong	2011
Believe Nothing	United Kingdom	2002
Bella and the Bulldogs	United States	2015–2016
Ben and Kate	United States	2012–2013
Ben et Thomas	France	2008
Benidorm	United Kingdom	2007–2018
Benson	United States	1979–1986
The Bernie Mac Show	United States	2001–2006
Beryl's Lot	United Kingdom	1973–1977
Best Friends Whenever	United States	2015–2016
Best of the West	United States	1981–1982
Best Selling Secrets	Hong Kong	2007–2008
Bette	United States	2000–2001
Better Off Ted	United States	2009–2010
Better with You	United States	2010–2011
The Betty Hutton Show	United States	1959–1960
The Betty White Show	United States	1977–1978
Between Brothers	United States	1997–1999
Beulah	United States	1950–1953
The Beverly Hillbillies	United States	1962–1971
Beverly Hills Buntz	United States	1987–1988
Beware of Dog	United States	2002
Bewitched	United States	1964–1972
The Bickersons	United States	1946–1951
Bhaag Bakool Bhaag	India	2017
Big Babies	United Kingdom	2010
Big Bad World	United Kingdom	2013
The Big Bang Theory	United States	2007–2019
Big Boy Now!	United Kingdom	1976
Big Brother Jake	United States	1990–1994
Big Day	United States	2006–2007
The Big House	United States	2004
Big John, Little John	United States	1976
Big Mouth	United States	2017–2025
The Big One	United Kingdom	1992
Big School	United Kingdom	2013–2014
Big Time Rush	United States	2009–2013
Big Top	United Kingdom	2009
Big Wave Dave's	United States	1993
The Bill Cosby Show	United States	1969–1971
The Bill Dana Show	United States	1963–1965
The Bill Engvall Show	United States	2007–2009
Billy (1979 TV series)	United States	1979
Billy (1992 TV series)	United States	1992
Billy Bunter of Greyfriars School	United Kingdom	1952–1961
Billy Liar	United Kingdom	1973–1974
Birdgirl	United States	2021–2022
Birds of a Feather	United Kingdom	1989–1998, 2014–2020
Bitange i princeze	Croatia	2005–2010
Bizaardvark	United States	2016–2019
Black-ish	United States	2014–2022
Blackadder	United Kingdom	1983–1989
Black and Blue	United Kingdom	1973
Black Books	United Kingdom	2000–2004
Blackfly	Canada	2001–2002
Black Tie Affair	United States	1993
Blandings	United Kingdom	2013–2014
Blandings Castle	United Kingdom	1967
Blansky's Beauties	United States	1977
The Bleak Old Shop of Stuff	United Kingdom	2011–2012
Blessed	United Kingdom	2005
Bless Me, Father	United Kingdom	1978–1981
Bless the Harts	United States	2019–2021
Bless This House (American TV series)	United States	1995–1996
Bless This House (British TV series)	United Kingdom	1971–1976
Bless This Mess	United States	2019–2020
Bloomers	United Kingdom	1979
Bloomin' Marvellous	United Kingdom	1997
Blossom	United States	1991–1995
Blue Heaven	United Kingdom	1994
Bluestone 42	United Kingdom	2013–2015
Bnot HaZahav	Israel	2011–2016
Bob	United States	1992–1993
Bob & Carol & Ted & Alice	United States	1973
Bob and Margaret	Canada/United Kingdom (season 1–2)	1998–2001
The Bob Crane Show	United States	1975
The Bob Cummings Show	United States	1955–1959
Bob Hearts Abishola	United States	2019–2024
Bob Martin	United Kingdom	2000–2001
The Bob Newhart Show	United States	1972–1978
Bob Patterson	United States	2001
Bob's Burgers	United States	2011–
Bob Servant	United Kingdom	2013–2014
Bobby's World	United States	1990–1998
Bodger & Badger	United Kingdom	1989–1999
BoJack Horseman	United States	2014–2020
Bonino	United States	1953
Bonjour la Classe	United Kingdom	1993
Bonnie	United States	1995–1996
The Book Group	United Kingdom	2002–2003
Boomers	United Kingdom	2014–2016
The Boondocks	United States	2005–2014
Borderline	United Kingdom	2016–2017
Bordertown	United States	2016
Boris	Italy	2007–2010; 2022
Born and Bred	United Kingdom	2002–2005
Bosom Buddies	United States	1980–1982
Boston Common	United States	1996–1997
Bottom	United Kingdom	1991–1995
Les Bougon	Canada	2004–2006
Bounty Hunters	United States	2013
Boy Meets Girl	United Kingdom	2015–2016
Boy Meets World	United States	1993–2000
The Boys Are Back	United States	1994–1995
Boys Will Be Boys	United States	1987–1988
The Brady Brides	United States	1981
The Brady Bunch	United States	1969–1974
The Brak Show	United States	2000–2003
Bram & Alice	United States	2002
Brass Monkeys	Australia	1984
Bread	United Kingdom	1986–1991
Breaker High	United States	1997–1998
The Brian Benben Show	United States	1998
Bridget Loves Bernie	United States	1972–1973
Brickleberry	United States	2012–2015
Bringing Up Buddy	United States	1960–1961
The Brittas Empire	United Kingdom	1991–1997
Broadside	United States	1964–1965
Broad City	United States	2014–2019
Broke	United States	2020
Bromwell High	United Kingdom	2005
Brooklyn Bridge	United States	1991–1993
Brooklyn Nine-Nine	United States	2013–2021
Brotherly Love (1995 TV series)	United States	1995–1997
Brotherly Love (1999 TV series)	United Kingdom	1999–2000
Brothers (1984 TV series)	United States	1984–1989
Brothers (2009 TV series)	United States	2009
The Brothers	United States	1956–1958
Brothers and Sisters	United States	1979
The Brothers García	United States	2000–2004
The Brothers Grunt	Canada/United States	1994–1995
Brothers in Law	United Kingdom	1962
Brother's Keeper	United States	1998–1999
Bro'Town	New Zealand	2004–2009
Brush Strokes	United Kingdom	1986–1991
Bucket	United Kingdom	2017
Bucket & Skinner's Epic Adventures	United States	2011–2013
Buddies	United States	1996
Buffalo Bill	United States	1983–1984
Built to Last	United States	1997
Bulbulay	Pakistan	2009–present
Bunk'd	United States	2015–2024
The Burns and Allen Show	United States	1950–1958
Bustin' Loose	United States	1987–1988
Busting Loose	United States	1977
Butterflies	United Kingdom	1978–1983

== C ==
Title	Country	Years
C.P.O. Sharkey	United States	1976–1978
California Dreams	United States	1992–1996
Call Me Kat	United States	2021–2023
Caméra Café	France	2001–2003
Camp Runamuck	United States	1965–1966
Camp Wilder	United States	1992–1993
Can't Hurry Love	United States	1995–1996
Capitol Critters	United States	1992
Captain Fall	United States	2023
Captain Nice	United States	1967
Car 54, Where Are You?	United States	1961–1963
The Cara Williams Show	United States	1964–1965
The Carmichael Show	United States	2015–2017
Caroline in the City	United States	1995–1999
Carpoolers	United States	2007–2008
Carter Country	United States	1977–1979
Carters Get Rich	United Kingdom	2017
Catastrophe	United Kingdom	2015–2019
Catherine	Canada	1985–1988
Cavemen	United States	2007
Central Park	United States	2020–2022
Chalk	United Kingdom	1997
Champions	United States	2018
Chance in a Million	United Kingdom	1984–1986
Charles in Charge	United States	1984–1990
The Charmings	United States	1987–1988
Checking In	United States	1981
Check it Out!	Canada	1985–1988
Cheers	United States	1982–1993
Chef!	United Kingdom	1993–1996
Chewing Gum	United Kingdom	2015–2017
The Chicago Teddy Bears	United States	1971
Chicken Soup	United States	1989
Chika Chika Chicks	Philippines	1979–1991
Chico and the Man	United States	1974–1978
The Chimp Channel	United States	1999
China, IL	United States	2011–2015
Chozen	United States	2014
ChuckleVision	United Kingdom	1987–2009
Chuggington	United Kingdom/china	2008–2015; 2021
Chupke Chupke	Pakistan	2021
Citizen James	United Kingdom	1960–1962
Citizen Khan	United Kingdom	2012–2016
Citizen Smith	United Kingdom	1977–1980
City Guys	United States	1997–2001
Clarence	United States	2014–2018
Clarissa Explains It All	United States	1991–1994
The Class	United States	2006–2007
Clerks: The Animated Series	United States	2000–2002
The Cleveland Show	United States	2009–2013
Click and Clack's As the Wrench Turns	United States	2008
Clone	United Kingdom	2008
Clone High	Canada and United States	2002–2003; 2023–2024
Close Enough	United States	2020–2022
Clueless	United States	1996–1999
Coach	United States	1989–1997
Code Monkeys	United States	2007
Co-Ed Fever	United States	1979
Coke Kahani	Pakistan	2012
The Comeback	United States	2005; 2014; 2026
Come Back Mrs. Noah	United Kingdom	1977–1978
Come Fly with Me	United Kingdom	2010–2011
Come Home Love	Hong Kong	2012–2015
Come Home Love: Lo and Behold	Hong Kong	2017–present
Committed	United States	2005
Common Side Effects	United States	2025–
Community	United States	2009–2015
Complete Savages	United States	2004–2005
Con el culo al aire	Spain	2012–2014
Condo	United States	1983
The Conners	United States	2018–2025
The Cool Kids	United States	2018–2019
The Corner Bar	United States	1972
Corner Gas	Canada	2004–2009
Corner Gas Animated	Canada	2018–2021
Cory in the House	United States	2007–2008
Cosby	United States	1996–2000
The Cosby Show	United States	1984–1992
Cougar Town	United States	2009–2015
Count Arthur Strong	United Kingdom	2013–2017
Coupling (American TV series)	United States	2003
Coupling (British TV series)	United Kingdom	2000–2004
Courting Alex	United States	2006
The Courtship of Eddie's Father	United States	1969–1972
Cousin Skeeter	United States	1998–2003
Cradle to Grave	United Kingdom	2015
Crapston Villas	United Kingdom	1995–1997
Crash & Bernstein	United States	2012–2014
The Crazy Ones	United States	2013–2014
Crims	United Kingdom	2015
Cristela	United States	2014–2015
The Critic	United States	1994–1995
Crossing Swords	United States	2020–2021
Crowded	United States	2016
Crumbs	United States	2006
The Crust	United Kingdom	2004–2005
Cuckoo	United Kingdom	2012–2019
The Cuckoo Waltz	United Kingdom	1975–1980
Curb Your Enthusiasm	United States	2000–2024
Curry and Chips	United Kingdom	1969
Cuts	United States	2005–2006
Cutters	United States	1993
Cybill	United States	1995–1998

== D ==
Title	Country	Years
Dad Stop Embarrassing Me!	United States	2021
Dads	United States	2013–2014
Dad's Army	United Kingdom	1968–1977
Daddy Dearest	United States	1993
Daddy's Girls	United States	1994
Dan for Mayor	Canada	2010
Dan Vs.	United States	2011–2013
Danger Force	United States	2020–2024
Dani's House	United Kingdom	2008–2012
Dani's Castle	United Kingdom	2013–2015
Dans une galaxie près de chez vous	Canada	1998–2001
Darcy's Wild Life	Canada, United States	2004–2006
Daddio	United States	2000
Daria	United States	1997–2002
Date with the Angels	United States	1957–1958
Dave	United States	2020–2023
Dave's World	United States	1993–1997
Day by Day	United States	1988–1989
De Kotmadam	Belgium	1991–2024
Dear John (American TV series)	United States	1988–1992
Dear John (British TV series)	United Kingdom	1986–1987
Dear Phoebe	United States	1954–1955
Death Valley	United States	2011
December Bride	United States	1954–1959
Dekh Bhai Dekh	India	1992–1997
Delilah	Canada	1973–1974
Delocated	United States	2008–2013
Delta	United States	1992–1993
Delta House	United States	1979
The Dennis O'Keefe Show	United States	1959–1960
Dennis the Menace	United States	1959–1963
Derek	United Kingdom	2012–2014
Designing Women	United States	1986–1993
Desmond's	United Kingdom	1989–1994
Detectorists	United Kingdom	2014–2017
Devil May Care	United States	2021
Dharma & Greg	United States	1997–2002
Diana	United States	1973–1974
The Dick Van Dyke Show	United States	1961–1966
Dicktown	United States	2020–2022
A Different World	United States	1987–1993; 2026–
Diff'rent Strokes	United States	1978–1986
Digby Dragon	United Kingdom	2016–2019
Digman!	United States	2023–
Dilbert	United States	1999–2000
dinnerladies	United Kingdom	1998–2000
Dinosaurs	United States	1991–1994
DiResta	United States	1998–1999
Disenchantment	United States	2018–2022
Disjointed	United States	2017
Doc	United States	1975–1976
Doctor, Doctor	United States	1989–1991
Doctor in the House	United Kingdom	1969–1970
Dolly Darling	Pakistan	2019–2020
Dr. Katz, Professional Therapist	United States	1995–2002
Dr. Ken	United States	2015–2017
Dog Bites Man	United States	2006
Dog with a Blog	United States	2012–2015
The Donna Reed Show	United States	1958–1966
Don't Call Me Charlie!	United States	1962–1963
Don't Trust the B— in Apartment 23	United States	2012–2013
Doogie Howser, M.D.	United States	1989–1993
Do Over	United States	2002
The Doris Day Show	United States	1968–1973
Dossa and Joe	Australia	2002
Double Rush	United States	1995
Double Trouble (American TV series)	United States	1984–1985
Double Trouble (Australian TV series)	Australia	2008
Down and Out in Beverly Hills	United States	1987
Down to Earth	United States	1983–1987
Downward Dog	United States	2017
Drake & Josh	United States	2004–2007
Dramay Baziyan	Pakistan	2014
Drawn Together	United States	2004–2007
Dream Corp LLC	United States	2016–2020
Dream On	United States	1990–1996
The Drew Carey Show	United States	1995–2004
Drexell's Class	United States	1991–1992
Drifters	United Kingdom	2013–2016
Drop the Dead Donkey	United Kingdom	1990–1998
The Duck Factory	United States	1984
Duckman	United States	1994–1997
The Dumplings	United States	1976
Duncanville	United States	2020–2022
The Dustbinmen	United Kingdom	1969–1970
Dugdugi	Pakistan	2011–2015
Duty Free	United Kingdom	1984–1986
Dweebs	United States	1995

== E ==
Title	Country	Years
E/R	United States	1984–1985
Early Doors	United Kingdom	2003–2004
Eastbound & Down	United States	2009–2013
The Egg and I	United States	1951–1952
Eisenhower and Lutz	United States	1988
Electric Bloom	United States	2025
Elephants to Catch Eels	United Kingdom	2003–2004
Ellen	United States	1994–1998
The Ellen Show	United States	2001–2002
Emily's Reasons Why Not	United States	2006
Empty	United Kingdom	2008
Empty Nest	United States	1988–1995
End of Part One	United Kingdom	1979
English Teacher	United States	2024–2025
Ensign O'Toole	United States	1962–1963
Episodes	United Kingdom, United States	2011–2017
Erin & Aaron	United States	2023
Euskolegas	Spain	2009
Eve	United States	2003–2006
Evening Shade	United States	1990–1994
Even Stevens	United States	2000–2003
Everybody Hates Chris	United States	2005–2009
Everybody Still Hates Chris	United States	2024–
Everybody Loves Raymond	United States	1996–2005
Everything's Relative	United States	1987
Excuse My French	Canada	1974–1976
The Exes	United States	2011–2015
Exploding Kittens	United States	2024
Extended Family	United States	2023–2024
Extras	United Kingdom	2005–2006
Extras: The Mango People	Pakistan	2011–2013

== F ==
Title	Country	Years
F Is for Family	United States	2015–2021
F Troop	United States	1965–1967
The Facts of Life	United States	1979–1988
The Faculty	United States	1996
Fair Exchange	United States	1962–1963
Faking It	United States	2014–2016
Fairfax	United States	2021–2022
Fairview	United States	2022
The Fall and Rise of Reginald Perrin	United Kingdom	1976–1979
Fam	United States	2019
La familia P. Luche	Mexico	2002–2012
Une famille formidable	France	1992–2008
Family Affair (1966 TV series)	United States	1966–1971
Family Affair (2002 TV series)	United States	2002–2003
A Family for Joe	United States	1990
Family Front	Pakistan	1995
The Family Genius	United States	1949
Family Guy	United States	1999–2003; 2005–
Family Matters	United States	1989–1998
Family Ties	United States	1982–1989
The Fanelli Boys	United States	1990–1991
Farmacia de guardia	Spain	1991–1995
The Farmer's Daughter	United States	1963–1966
Farzar	United States	2022
Fascht e Familie	Switzerland	1994–1999
Father, Dear Father	United Kingdom	1968–1973
Father, Dear Father in Australia	Australia	1978
Fast Layne	United States	2019
Father Knows Best	United States	1954–1960
Father of the Bride	United States	1961–1962
Father of the Pride	United States	2004–2005
Father Ted	United Kingdom	1995–1998
Fatherhood	United States	2004–2005
Fawlty Towers	United Kingdom	1975–1979
F.C. De Kampioenen	Belgium	1990–2011
Fernwood 2 Night	United States	1977
Fifty Fifty	Pakistan	1978–1984
Filthy Rich	United States	1982–1983
A Fine Romance	United Kingdom	1981–1984
Fired on Mars	United States	2023
Fired Up	United States	1997–1998
F.I.R.	India	2006–2015
First of the Summer Wine	United Kingdom	1988–1989
First Time Out	United States	1995
Fish	United States	1977–1978
Fish Hooks	United States	2010–2014
Fish Police	United States	1992
Fisk	Australia	2021–present
Flatbush	United States	1979
Fleabag	United Kingdom	2016–2019
Fleksnes Fataliteter	Norway	1972
Flight of the Conchords	United States	2007–2009
The Flintstones	United States	1960–1966
Flo	United States	1980–1981
Flop Show	India	1989
Fly Tales	Canada/France	1999
Flying Blind	United States	1992–1993
The Flying Nun	United States	1967–1970
Foley Square	United States	1985–1986
For Your Love	United States	1998–2002
Frasier	United States	1993–2004
Frasier (2023 TV series)	United States	2023–2024
Freak Show	United States	2006
Freddie	United States	2005–2006
Free Agents	United Kingdom	2007
Free Country	United States	1978
Free for All	United States	2003
Free Spirit	United States	1989–1990
French Fields	United Kingdom	1989
Fresh Fields	United Kingdom	1984–1986
Fresh Meat	United Kingdom	2011–2016
Fresh Off the Boat	United States	2015–2020
The Fresh Prince of Bel-Air	United States	1990–1996
Friday Night Dinner	United Kingdom	2011–2020
Fried	United Kingdom	2015
Friends	United States	1994–2004
Fries With That?	Canada	2004
Frisky Dingo	United States	2006–2008
Frontline	Australia	1994−1997
Fugget About It	Canada, United States	2012–2016
Ful Haus	Philippines	2007–2009
Full English	United Kingdom	2012
Full House	United States	1987–1995
Fuller House	United States	2016–2020
Fun Khana	Pakistan	2012
Futurama	United States	1999–2003; 2008–2013; 2023–

== G ==
Title	Country	Years
Gabby Duran & the Unsittables	United States	2019–2021
The Gale Storm Show	United States	1956–1960
The Game	United States	2007–2015
GameFace	United Kingdom	2017–2019
Game On	United Kingdom	1995–1998
Game Over	United States	2004
The Games	Australia	1998–2000
Gamer's Guide to Pretty Much Everything	United States	2015–2017
Game Shakers	United States	2015–2019
Gary: Tank Commander	United Kingdom	2009–2012
Gary & Mike	United States	2001
Gary the Rat	United States	2003
Gary Unmarried	United States	2008–2010
Gavin & Stacey	United Kingdom	2007–2010
The Geena Davis Show	United States	2000–2001
George	United States	1993
George & Leo	United States	1997–1998
George and Mildred	United Kingdom	1976–1979
The George Carlin Show	United States	1994–1995
George Lopez	United States	2002–2007
Georgie & Mandy's First Marriage	United States	2024–
Get a Life	United States	1990–1992
Get Smart	United States	1965–1970, 1995
Getting By	United States	1993–1994
Getting On	United Kingdom	2009–2012
Getting Together	United States	1971–1972
The Ghost & Mrs. Muir	United States	1968–1970
Ghosts (2019 TV series)	United Kingdom	2019–2023
Ghosts (2021 TV series)	United States	2021–
Gidget	United States	1965–1966
Gilligan's Island	United States	1964–1967
Gimme a Break!	United States	1981–1987
Ginger Snaps	United States	2017
The Girl with Something Extra	United States	1973–1974
Girlfriends	United States	2000–2008
Girl Meets World	United States	2014–2017
Girls on Top	United Kingdom	1985–1986
Glenn Martin, DDS	United States	2009–2011
Gloria	United States	1982–1983
God, the Devil and Bob	United States	2000
Go! Go! Cory Carson	United States	2020–2021
Go On	United States	2012–2013
Going Dutch	United States	2025–2026
Going Places	United States	1990
Golan the Insatiable	United States	2013–2015
Going Straight	United Kingdom	1978
The Goldbergs (radio series)	United States	1949–1956
The Goldbergs (2013 TV series)	United States	2013–2023
The Golden Girls	United States	1985–1992
The Golden Palace	United States	1992–1993
Gomer Pyle, U.S.M.C.	United States	1964–1969
The Good Guys	United States	1968–1970
Good Heavens	United States	1976
The Good Life (1971 TV series)	United States	1971–1972
The Good Life (1975 TV series)	United Kingdom	1975–1977
Good Luck Charlie	United States	2010–2014
Good Morning, Miami	United States	2002–2004
Good Morning World	United States	1967–1968
Good News	United States	1997–1998
The Good Place	United States	2016–2020
Good Sports	United States	1991
Good Times	United States	1974–1979
Good Times: Black Again	United States	2024
Good Vibes	United States	2011
The Goode Family	United States	2009
The Goodies	United Kingdom	1970–1982
Goodnight, Beantown	United States	1983–1984
Goodnight Sweetheart	United Kingdom	1993–1999
Goof Troop	United States	1992
The Governor & J.J.	United States	1969–1971
Grace Under Fire	United States	1993–1998
Grady	United States	1975–1976
Grand Crew	United States	2021–2023
Grandfathered	United States	2015–2016
The Great Indoors	United States	2016–2017
Great News	United States	2017–2018
The Great North	United States	2021–2025
The Greatest American Hero	United States	1981–1983
Green Acres	United States	1965–1971
The Green Green Grass	United Kingdom	2005–2009
Green Wing	United Kingdom	2004–2007
Greetings from Tucson	United States	2002–2003
The Gregory Hines Show	United States	1997–1998
Grimsburg	United States	2024–
Grindl	United States	1963
Grosse Pointe	United States	2000–2001
Grounded for Life	United States	2001–2005
Growing Pains	United States	1985–1992
Growing Up Fisher	United States	2014
Grown-ish	United States	2018–2024
Grown Ups (1997 TV series)	United Kingdom	1997
Grown Ups (1999 TV series)	United States	1999–2000
Grownups	United Kingdom	2006–2009
GT Road	Pakistan	2019–2020
Guest House	Pakistan	1991

== H ==
Title	Country	Years
H	France	1998–2002
Ha-Chaim Ze Lo Hacol	Israel	2001–2011
HaChaverim Shel Naor	Israel	2006–present
Haggard	United Kingdom	1990–1991
Half & Half	United States	2002–2006
Hallelujah!	United Kingdom	1981–1984
Halka Na Lo	Pakistan	2012–2013
The Halls of Ivy (radio series)	United States	1950-1952
The Halls of Ivy (TV series)	United States	1954-1955
Hancock	United Kingdom	1961
Hancock's Half Hour	United Kingdom	1954–1960
Hang Time	United States	1995–2000
Hangin' In	Canada	1981–1987
Hangin' with Mr. Cooper	United States	1992–1997
Hank	United States	2009
Hannah Montana	United States	2006–2011
The Hank McCune Show	United States	1950–1953
Hapi House!	Philippines	1987–1989
HaPijamot	Israel	2003–2015
Happily Divorced	United States	2011–2013
Happy	United States	1960–1961
Happy Days	United States	1974–1984
Happy Endings	United States	2011–2013
Happy Hour	United States	2006
Happy Together	United States	2018–2019
Happy's Place	United States	2024–
The Harper House	United States	2021
Hardwicke House	United Kingdom	1987
Hardware	United Kingdom	2003–2004
Harper Valley P.T.A.	United States	1981
Harrigan and Son	United States	1960–1961
Harris Against the World	United States	1964–1965
Harry and the Hendersons	United States	1991–1993
Harvey Birdman, Attorney at Law	United States	2000–2007
Harvey Girls Forever!	United States	2018–2020
The Hathaways	United States	1961–1962
The Haunted Hathaways	United States	2013–2015
Hausmeister Krause – Ordnung muss sein	Germany	1999–2008
Hazel	United States	1961–1966
He's the Mayor	United States	1986
Head of the Class	United States	1986–1991
Head of the Class (2021 TV series)	United States	2021
Heil Honey I'm Home!	United Kingdom	1990
Hello, Larry	United States	1979
The Help	United States	2004
Help Me Help You	United States	2006
Hennesey	United States	1959–1962
Henry Danger	United States	2014–2020
Henry IX	United Kingdom	2017
Here Come the Brides	United States	1968–1970
Here Come the Habibs	Australia	2016–2017
Here We Go Again (1973 TV series)	United States	1973
Here We Go Again (2016 TV series)	United States	2016
Here's Lucy	United States	1968–1974
Herman's Head	United States	1991–1994
Hey Dad..!	Australia	1987–1994
Hey Monie!	United States	2003
Hey, Jeannie!	United States	1956–1957
Hi Honey, I'm Home!	United States	1991–1992
Hiccups	Canada	2010
Hidden Hills	United States	2002–2003
High Kick!	South Korea	2006–2007
High School USA!	United States	2013–2015
High Society	United States	1995–1996
Highly Strung Hannah	United Kingdom	2011–2018
Him & Her	United Kingdom	2010–2013
Hitz	United States	1997–1998
Hoff the Record	United Kingdom	2015–2016
The Hogan Family	United States	1986–1991
Hogan's Daughter	United States	1949
Hogan's Heroes	United States	1965–1971
Holiday and Company	United States	1946
Hollywood 7	United Kingdom	2001
Home Along Da Riles (later Home Along Da Airport)	Philippines	1992–2003; 2003–2005
Home Economics	United States	2021–2023
Home Improvement	United States	1991–1999
Home Movies	United States	1999–2004
Home with Kids	China	2005–2008
Homeboys in Outer Space	United States	1996–1997
Honey, I Shrunk the Kids: The TV Show	United States	1997–2000
The Honeymooners	United States	1955–1956
Hoops	United States	2020
Hope & Faith	United States	2003–2006
Hopeless Pictures	United States	2005
Hot in Cleveland	United States	2010–2015
Hot L Baltimore	United States	1975
Hot Properties	United States	2005
Hotel Poldruga zvezdica	Slovenia	2004–2006
Hotel Trubble	United Kingdom	2008–2011
Hounded	United Kingdom	2010
House of Fools	United Kingdom	2014–2015
House of Mouse	United States	2001–2003
House Rules	United States	1998
HouseBroken	United States	2021–2023
Housos	Australia	2011–2013 2020–present
How I Met Your Father	United States	2022–2023
How I Met Your Mother	United States	2005–2014
How to Be Indie	Canada	2009–2012
How Not to Live Your Life	United Kingdom	2007–2010
How to Rock	United States	2012
Hubert & Takako	France	2013–2015
Husbands	United States	2011–2013
The Hughleys	United States	1998–2002
Hum Paanch	India	1995–2006
Hum Sab Ajeeb Se Hain	Pakistan	2016–2018
Hum Sub Umeed Se Hain	Pakistan	2007–2015
Human Kind Of	United States	2018
Human Resources	United States	2022–2023
Hyperdrive	United Kingdom	2006–2007

== I ==
Title	Country	Years
I Am Not an Animal	United Kingdom	2004
iCarly	United States	2007–2012
iCarly (2021 TV series)	United States	2021–2023
Ichabod and Me	United States	1961–1962
Ideal	United Kingdom	2005–2011
I Didn't Do It	United States	2014–2015
I Didn't Know You Cared	United Kingdom	1975–1979
I Dream of Jeannie	United States	1965–1970
I Feel Bad	United States	2018
I Love Lucy	United States	1951–1957
I Married Dora	United States	1987
I Married Joan	United States	1952–1955
I Want My Wife Back	United Kingdom	2016
I'm Alan Partridge	United Kingdom	1997, 2002
I'm Dickens, He's Fenster	United States	1962–1963
I'm in the Band	United States	2009–2011
I'm with Her	United States	2003–2004
I'm Sorry	United States	2017–2018
Imaginary Mary	United States	2017
In Loving Memory	United Kingdom	1979–1986
In Sickness and in Health	United Kingdom	1985–1992
In the House	United States	1995–1999
In the Know	United States	2024
The Inbetweeners	United Kingdom	2008–2010
The Inbetweeners (American TV series)	United States	2012
Ink	United States	1996–1997
Inside Job	United States	2021–2022
Instant Mom	United States	2013–2015
Is It Legal?	United Kingdom	1995–1998
iShine KNECT	United States	2009–2015
Iskul Bukol	Philippines	1978–1990
It Ain't Half Hot Mum	United Kingdom	1974–1981
The IT Crowd	United Kingdom	2006–2013
It's a Living	United States	1980–1982, 1985–1989
It's About Time	United States	1966–1967
It's All Relative	United States	2003–2004
It's Always Jan	United States	1955–1956
It's Always Sunny in Philadelphia	United States	2005–present
It's Garry Shandling's Show	United States	1986–1990
It's Like, You Know...	United States	1999–2000
It's Your Move	United States	1984–1985

== J ==
Title	Country	Years
Ja'mie: Private School Girl	Australia	2013
Jake in Progress	United States	2004–2006
Jalebiyan	Pakistan	2014
The Jamie Foxx Show	United States	1996–2001
The Jeannie Carson Show	United States	1958
Jeff & Some Aliens	United States	2017
The Jeff Foxworthy Show	United States	1995–1997
The Jeffersons	United States	1975–1985
The Jellies!	United States	2017–2019
Jennifer Slept Here	United States	1983-1984
Jenny	United States	1997–1998
Jesse	United States	1998–2000
Jessie	United States	2011–2015
The Jetsons	United States	1962–1963; 1985–1987
The Jim Backus Show	United States	1960–1961
The Jimmy Stewart Show	United States	1971–1972
Joanie Loves Chachi	United States	1982–1983
Joey	United States	2004–2006
John & Marsha	Philippines	1973–1990
John Callahan's Quads!	Canada/Australia	2001–2002
The John Larroquette Show	United States	1993–1996
Joking Apart	United Kingdom	1993–1995
Jonah from Tonga	Australia	2014
Jonas	United States	2009–2010
Joru Ka Ghulam	Pakistan	2014–2016
Josh	United Kingdom	2014–2017
Julia	United States	1968–1971
Just Good Friends	United Kingdom	1983–1986
Just Roll with It	United States	2019–2021
Just Shoot Me!	United States	1997–2003
Just the Ten of Us	United States	1988–1990

== K ==
Title	Country	Years
K.C. Undercover	United States	2015–2018
Kaamelott	France	2005–2009
Kabhi Band Kabhi Baja	Pakistan	2018
kafe tis Charas, To	Greece	2003–2006
The Kallikaks	United States	1977
Kappa Mikey	United States	2006–2008
Karen (1964 TV series)	United States	1964–1965
Karen (1975 TV series)	United States	1975
Kate & Allie	United States	1984–1989
Kath & Kim (American TV series)	United States	2008–2009
Kath & Kim (Australian TV series)	Australia	2002–2007
Katie Joplin	United States	1999
Keep It in the Family	United Kingdom	1971
Keeping Up Appearances	United Kingdom	1990–1995
Kelas Internasional	Indonesia	2015–2017
Kenan & Kel	United States	1996–2000
The Kennedys	United Kingdom	2015
Kerching!	United Kingdom	2003–2006
Kevin Can Wait	United States	2016–2018
Kevin Spencer	Canada	1999–2005
Khatti Meethi Zindagi	Pakistan	2011
Khawaja and Son	Pakistan	1985
Khichdi (now as Instant Khichdi)	India	2000–present
Kickin' It	United States	2011–2015
Kid Notorious	United States	2003
The Kids Are Alright	United States	2018–2019
The Kids International Show	United Kingdom	1982
Kim's Convenience	Canada	2016–2021
Kinderen geen bezwaar	Netherlands	2004–2013
King of Kensington	Canada	1975–1980
The King of Queens	United States	1998–2007
King of the Hill	United States	1997–2010; 2025–
Kingswood Country	Australia	1980–1984
Kinvig	United Kingdom	1981
Kirby Buckets	United States	2014-2017
Kirk	United States	1995–1996
Kirstie	United States	2013–2014
Kis Din Mera Viyah Howay Ga	Pakistan	2011–2018
Kitchen Confidential	United States	2005
Klovn	Denmark	2005–2009
The Knights of Prosperity	United States	2007
Knight Squad	United States	2018–2019
Koala Man	Australia/United States	2023
Konstantinou kai Elenis	Greece	1998–2000
Krapopolis	United States	2023–
Kristin	United States	2001
Krovim Krovim	Israel	1983–1986, 2005

== L ==
Title	Country	Years
L.A. 7	United Kingdom	2000
Lab Rats	United States	2012–2016
Lab Rats: Elite Force	United States	2016
Ladies Man	United States	1999–2001
Ladies Park	Pakistan	2011
Lahori Gate	Pakistan	2007
La que se avecina	Spain	2007–present
Langt fra Las Vegas	Denmark	2001–2004
Lapataganj	India	2009–2014
The Larry Sanders Show	United States	1992–1998
The Last of the Australians	Australia	1975
Last of the Summer Wine	United Kingdom	1973–2010
Last Man Standing	United States	2011–2021
The Last Resort	United States	1979–1980
The Latest Buzz	Canada	2007–2010
Laverne & Shirley	United States	1976–1983
Laverne & Shirley in the Army	United States	1981
Lead Balloon	United Kingdom	2006–2011
The League	United States	2009–2015
The League of Gentlemen	United Kingdom	1999–2002; 2017
Leanne	United States	2025–
Learning the Ropes	United States	1988
Leave It to Beaver	United States	1957–1963
Leave it to Charlie	United Kingdom	1978-1980
The Legend of Dick and Dom	United Kingdom	2009–2011
Legends of Chamberlain Heights	United States	2016–2017
Lemon La Vida Loca	United Kingdom	2012–2013
The Lenny Henry Show	United Kingdom	1987
Less Than Perfect	United States	2002–2006
Letterkenny	Canada	2016–2023
Lewis & Clark	United States	1981
The Life & Times of Tim	United States	2008–2012
Life in Pieces	United States	2015–2019
Life of Riley	United Kingdom	2009–2011
The Life of Riley	United States	1949–1950, 1953–1958
Life on a Stick	United States	2005
Life with Bonnie	United States	2002–2004
Life with Derek	Canada	2005–2009
Life with Elizabeth	United States	1952–1955
Life's Work	United States	1996–1997
Like Family	United States	2003–2004
The Likely Lads	United Kingdom	1964–1968
Listen Up	United States	2004–2005
Little Demon	United States	2022
Little Mosque on the Prairie	Canada	2007–2012
Little Roy	United Kingdom	2016–2017
The Liver Birds	United Kingdom	1969–1979, 1996
Living Biblically	United States	2018
Living in Captivity	United States	1998
Living Single	United States	1993–1998
Living With Fran	United States	2005–2006
Liv and Maddie	United States	2013–2017
Lizzie McGuire	United States	2001–2004
Ljubav, navika, panika	Serbia	2005–2007
Lola & Virginia	Spain/Basque Country	2006–2007
The Loop	United States	2006–2007
Loose Talk	Pakistan	2002–2008
Lopez vs Lopez	United States	2022–2025
Lotsa Luck	United States	1973
Louie	United States	2010–2015
Love, American Style	United States	1969–1974
Love and Marriage (1959 TV series)	United States	1959–1960
Love and Marriage (1996 TV series)	United States	1996
The Love Boat	United States	1977–1986
Love, Nina	United Kingdom	2016
Love on a Rooftop	United States	1966–1967
Love That Jill	United States	1958
Love Thy Neighbour	United Kingdom	1972–1976
Love, Inc.	United States	2005–2006
Lovesick	United Kingdom	2014–2018
Love, Sidney	United States	1981–1983
Loves Me, Loves Me Not	United States	1977
Lucas Bros. Moving Co.	United States	2013–2015
Lucky Louie	United States	2006
The Lucy Show	United States	1962–1968
The Lucy–Desi Comedy Hour	United States	1957–1960
Lud Zbunjen Normalan	Bosnia and Herzegovina	2007–2021
Lunatics	Australia	2019

== M ==
Title	Country	Years
M*A*S*H	United States	1972–1983
M.O.D.O.K.	United States	2021
Mack & Myer for Hire	United States	1963–1964
Mad	United States	2010–2013
Mad About You	United States	1992–1999; 2019
Mad Love	United States	2011
Madigan Men	United States	2000
Maggie Winters	United States	1998–1999
Magical Girl Friendship Squad	United States	2020
Magical Girl Friendship Squad: Origins	United States	2020
Maid Marian and her Merry Men	United Kingdom	1989–1994
Major Dad	United States	1989–1993
Make Room for Daddy	United States	1953–1965
Makin' It	United States	1979
Making the Grade	United States	1982
Mal.com	Australia	2011
Malcolm & Eddie	United States	1996–2000
Malcolm in the Middle	United States	2000–2006
Malcolm in the Middle: Life's Still Unfair	United States	2026
Malibu, CA	United States	1998–2000
Malibu Country	United States	2012–2013
Mama Malone	United States	1984
Mama's Family	United States	1983–1990
Mannchalay	Pakistan	2009–2010
Man About the House	United Kingdom	1973–1976
Man Down	United Kingdom	2013–2017
Man Up!	United States	2011
Man with a Plan	United States	2016–2020
Manhattan Love Story	United States	2014
Maniac Mansion	Canada	1990–1993
Many Happy Returns	United States	1964–1965
The Many Loves of Dobie Gillis	United States	1959–1963
Marblehead Manor	United States	1987–1988
Marge and Jeff	United States	1953–1954
Margie	United States	1961–1962
Marlon	United States	2017–2018
Married People	United States	1990
Married to the Kellys	United States	2003–2004
Married... with Children	United States	1987–1997
Martin	United States	1992–1997
Mary	United States	1985–1986
Mary Hartman, Mary Hartman	United States	1976–1977
Mary Kay and Johnny	United States	1947–1950
The Mary Tyler Moore Show	United States	1970–1977
Marvin Marvin	United States	2012–2013
Maude	United States	1972–1978
Max and Paddy's Road to Nowhere	United Kingdom	2004
May to December	United Kingdom	1989–1994
Maybe It's Me	United States	2001–2002
Mayberry R.F.D.	United States	1968–1971
The Mayor	United States	2017
McHale's Navy	United States	1962–1966
McKeever and the Colonel	United States	1962–1963
Me and Maxx	United States	1980
Me and My Girl	United Kingdom	1984–1988
Me and My Monsters	United Kingdom/Australia	2010–2011
Me and the Boys	United States	1994–1995
Me and the Chimp	United States	1972
Me, Myself & I	United States	2017–2018
Mein Leben & Ich	Germany	1999–2006
Melissa & Joey	United States	2010–2015
Melody Rules	New Zealand	1995
Memoari porodice Milić	Bosnia and Herzegovina	1990
Men Behaving Badly	United Kingdom	1992–1998
Men Behaving Badly (American TV series)	United States	1996–1997
Meri Teri Kahani	Pakistan	2013–2014
Men Kai Oi Den, Oi	Greece	1993–1996
Men with Brooms	Canada	2010
Menasha the Magnificent	United States	1950
Merry Happy Whatever	United States	2019
Method & Red	United States	2004–2005
Miami 7	United Kingdom	1999
The Michael J. Fox Show	United States	2013–2014
The Michael Richards Show	United States	2000
Michael: Tuesdays and Thursdays	Canada	2011
The Mick	United States	2017–2018
Mid-Century Modern	United States	2025
The Middle	United States	2009–2018
The Mighty Boosh	United Kingdom	2004–2007
Mike & Molly	United States	2010–2016
Mikromesaioi, Oi	Greece	1992–1993
The Millers	United States	2013–2014
Millie Inbetween	United Kingdom	2014–2018
Mind Your Language	United Kingdom	1977–1979, 1986
The Mindy Project	United States	2012–2017
Miranda	United Kingdom	2009–2015
Miss Fire	Pakistan	2013–2014
Mission Hill	United States	1999–2002
Mister Ed	United States	1961–1966
Mister Peepers	United States	1952–1955
Mithu Aur Aapa	Pakistan	2014
Mixed-ish	United States	2019–2021
Mixology	United States	2014
Mr. Shamim	Pakistan	2014–2017
Mr. Terrific	United States	1967–1968
Modern Family	United States	2009–2020
Modern Men	United States	2006
Moesha	United States	1996–2001
Mom	United States	2013–2021
Momma Named Me Sheriff	United States	2019–2021
The Mommies	United States	1993–1995
Mongrels	United Kingdom	2010–2011
The Monkees	United States	1966–1968
Moonbeam City	United States	2015
Moral Orel	United States	2005–2008
The Morey Amsterdam Show	United States	1948–1950
Mork & Mindy	United States	1978–1982
Mortified	Australia	2006–2007
Mother and Son	Australia	1984–1994
The Mothers-in-Law	United States	1967–1969
Movie Stars	United States	1999–2000
Mr. Adams and Eve	United States	1957–1958
Mr. Baby	France	2009–2010
Mr. Bean	United Kingdom	1990–1995
Mr Bean: The Animated Series	United Kingdom	2002–2004; 2015–2019; 2025-present
Mr. Belvedere	United States	1985–1990
Mr. Box Office	United States	2012–2015
Mr. Iglesias	United States	2019–2020
Mr. Meaty	United States	2005–2009
Mr. Merlin	United States	1981
Mr. Pickles	United States	2014–2019
Mrs. Brown's Boys	United Kingdom	2011–present
Mrs. G. Goes to College	United States	1961–1962
Mulaney	United States	2014–2015
Mulberry	United Kingdom	1992–1993
The Mullets	United States	2003–2004
Mulligan	United States	2023–2024
Mungerilal Ke Haseen Sapne	India	1989–1990
Mum	United Kingdom	2016–2019
The Munsters	United States	1964–1966
The Munsters Today	United States	1988–1991
The Muppets	United States	2015-2016
The Muppets Mayhem	United States	2023
Murphy Brown	United States	1988–1998; 2018
Muscle	United States	1995
My Babysitter's a Vampire	Canada	2011–2012
My Big Fat Greek Life	United States	2003
My Boys	United States	2006–2010
My Brother and Me	United States	1994–1995
My Family	United Kingdom	2000–2011
My Favorite Husband	United States	1953–1955
My Favorite Martian	United States	1963–1966
My Friend Irma	United States	1952–1954
My Gym Partner's a Monkey	United States	2005–2008
My Hero (American TV series)	United States	1952–1953
My Hero (British TV series)	United Kingdom	2000–2006
My Husband and I	United Kingdom	1987–1988
My Little Margie	United States	1952–1955
My Living Doll	United States	1964–1965
My Mother the Car	United States	1965–1966
My Name Is Earl	United States	2005–2009
My Name Is Harry Worth	United Kingdom	1974
My Name's McGooley, What's Yours?	Australia	1966–1968
My Parents Are Aliens	United Kingdom	1999–2006
My Phone Genie	United Kingdom	2012
My Sister Eileen	United States	1960–1961
My Sister Sam	United States	1986–1988
My Talk Show	United States	1990–1991
My Three Sons	United States	1960–1972
My Two Dads	United States	1987–1990
My Wife and Kids	United States	2001–2005
My Wife Next Door	United Kingdom	1980
My World and Welcome to It	United States	1969–1970
Mystery Girls	United States	2014

== N ==
Title	Country	Years
Nadaaniyaan	Pakistan	2009–2011
Nadreality Show	Bosnia and Herzegovina	2006–2008
The Naked Brothers Band	United States	2007–2009
Nancy	United States	1970–1971
The Nanny	United States	1993–1999
Nanny and the Professor	United States	1970–1971
Napoleon Dynamite	United States	2012
Naša mala klinika (Croatian TV series)	Croatia	2004–2007
Naša mala klinika (Slovenian TV series)	Slovenia	2004–2008
Naukar Ke Agay Chakar	Pakistan	1982
Nearest and Dearest	United Kingdom	1968–1973
Nearly Departed	United States	1989
Ned and Stacey	United States	1995–1997
Ned's Declassified School Survival Guide	United States	2004–2007
Needles and Pins	United States	1973
Neighbors from Hell	United States	2010
The Neighborhood	United States	2018–2026
The New Adventures of Old Christine	United States	2006–2010
The New Andy Griffith Show	United States	1971
The New Bill Cosby Show	United States	1972
The New Bob Cummings Show	United States	1961–1962
The New Dick Van Dyke Show	United States	1971–1974
New Girl	United States	2011–2018
New Monkees	United States	1987
The New Odd Couple	United States	1982–1983
The New Phil Silvers Show	United States	1963–1964
New School	Italy	2017–2020
The New Statesman	United Kingdom	1987–1992
The New WKRP in Cincinnati	United States	1992–1993
Newhart	United States	1982–1990
NewsRadio	United States	1995–1999
Nick Freno: Licensed Teacher	United States	1996–1998
Nicky, Ricky, Dicky & Dawn	United States	2014–2018
Night Court	United States	1984–1992; 2023–2025
Nightingales	United Kingdom	1990–1993
Nighty Night	United Kingdom	2004–2005
Nikki	United States	2000–2002
Nirvanna the Band the Show	Canada	2017–2018
No Heroics	United Kingdom	2008
No Time For Sergeants	United States	1964–1965
Norby	United States	1955
Normal Life	United States	1990
The Norm Show	United States	1999–2001
Not Going Out	United Kingdom	2006–present
Ntoltse Vita	Greece	1995–1997
Nukkad	India	1986–1988
Nurses	United States	1991–1994

== O ==
Title	Country	Years
O'Grady	United States	2004–2006
The Oblongs	United States	2001–2002
Occasional Wife	United States	1966–1967
The Odd Couple (1970 TV series)	United States	1970–1975
The Odd Couple (2015 TV series)	United States	2015–2017
Odd Man Out	United States	1999–2000
Off Centre	United States	2001–2002
Off Pedder	Hong Kong	2008–2010
The Office (American TV series)	United States	2005–2013
The Office (British TV series)	United Kingdom	2001–2003
Office Office	India	2000–2004
Oh Baby	United States	1998–2000
Oh, Grow Up	United States	1999
Oh Madeline	United States	1983–1984
Oh! Those Bells	United States	1962
OK-JEK	Indonesia	2015–2018
OL Supreme	Hong Kong	2010
Oliver Beene	United States	2003–2004
On Our Own	United States	1977
On the Air	United States	1992
On the Buses	United Kingdom	1969–1973
On the Rocks	United States	1975–1976
One Day at a Time (1975 TV series)	United States	1975–1984
One Day at a Time (2017 TV series)	United States	2017–2020
One Foot in the Grave	United Kingdom	1990–2000
One in a Million	United States	1980
One of the Boys (1982 TV series)	United States	1982
One of the Boys (1989 TV series)	United States	1989
One on One	United States	2001–2006
Only Fools and Horses	United Kingdom	1981–1996, 2001–2003
Open All Hours	United Kingdom	1976–1985
Open All Night	United States	1981
'Orrible	United Kingdom	2001
Otvorena vrata	Serbia	1994–1995, 2013–2014
Our Cartoon President	United States	2018–2020
Our Miss Brooks	United States	1952–1956
Out All Night	United States	1992–1993
Out of Jimmy's Head	United States	2007–2008
Out of the Blue	United States	1979
Out of This World	United States	1987–1991
Outnumbered	United Kingdom	2007–2014; 2016
Outrageous Fortune	New Zealand	2005–2010
Outsourced	United States	2010–2011
Over the Top	United States	1997

== P ==
Title	Country	Years
Pair of Kings	United States	2010–2013
Palibhasa Lalake	Philippines	1987–1998
Paper Moon	United States	1974
Paradise PD	United States	2018–2022
The Parent 'Hood	United States	1995–1999
Parker Lewis Can't Lose	United States	1990–1993
The Parkers	United States	1999–2004
Parks and Recreation	United States	2009–2015; 2020 (special)
The Partners	United States	1971–1972
Partners	United States	2012
Partners	United States	2014
The Partridge Family	United States	1970–1974
Party Down	United States	2009–2010; 2023
Pasik	Hungary	2000–2003
Pasila	Finland	2007–2013
Pat & Stan	France	2004–2010
The Patty Duke Show	United States	1963–1966
The Patrick Star Show	United States	2021–present
The Paul Lynde Show	United States	1972–1973
Paul Sand in Friends and Lovers	United States	1974–1975
Pearl	United States	1996–1997
The Pebbles and Bamm-Bamm Show	United States	1971–1972
Peep Show	United Kingdom	2003–2015
Pelswick	Canada/China	2000–2002
Pen Tor	Thailand	2004–2012
The People's Choice	United States	1955–1958
People Just Do Nothing	United Kingdom	2012–2018
Pepito Manaloto	Philippines	2010–2012, 2012–present
A Perfect State	United Kingdom	1997
Perfect Strangers	United States	1986–1993
Perfect World	United Kingdom	2001
Pete and Gladys	United States	1960–1962
Peter Kay's Car Share	United Kingdom	2015–2017
The Peter Lind Hayes Show	United States	1950-1951
Peter Loves Mary	United States	1960–1961
Peter Punk	Argentina	2011–2013
Petticoat Junction	United States	1963–1970
Phil of the Future	United States	2004–2006
The Phil Silvers Show	United States	1955–1959
Phoenix Nights	United Kingdom	2001–2002
PhoneShop	United Kingdom	2010–2013
Phyllis	United States	1975–1977
Pig Sty	United States	1995
Pinwright's Progress	United Kingdom	1946–1947
Pixelface	United Kingdom	2011–2012
Pizza	Australia	2000–2007 2019–2021
The PJs	United States	1999–2001
Plats bruts	Spain	1999–2002
Platypus Man	United States	1995
Please Don't Eat the Daisies	United States	1965–1967
Please Sir!	United Kingdom	1968–1972
Pompidou	United Kingdom	2015
Pond Life	United Kingdom	1996–2000
The Popcorn Kid	United States	1987
Popetown	United Kingdom	2005–2006
Poppa's House	United States	2024–2025
Porridge (1974 TV series)	United Kingdom	1974–1977
Porridge (2017 TV series)	United Kingdom	2016–2017
The Powers That Be	United States	1992–1993
The Practice	United States	1976–1977
Praise Petey	United States	2023
A Present for Dickie	United Kingdom	1969–1970
President Curtis	United States	2026–
Pretty Freekin Scary	United States	2023
The Prince	United States	2021
A Prince Among Men	United Kingdom	1997–1998
Private Secretary	United States	1953–1957
The Problem Solverz	United States	2011–2013
Public Morals	United States	1996–1997
Punky Brewster	United States	1984–1988, 2021

== Q ==
Title	Country	Years
Q-Force	United States	2021
Quacks	United Kingdom	2017
Quack Pack	United States	1996
Quark	United States	1978
Quddusi Sahab Ki Bewah	Pakistan	2012–2014
Queenie's Castle	United Kingdom	1970–1972
Quintuplets	United States	2004–2005

== R ==
Title	Country	Years
Rab C. Nesbitt	United Kingdom	1988–1999, 2008–2014
Rachel Gunn, R.N.	United States	1992
The Rag Trade	United Kingdom	1961–1963, 1977
Raised by Wolves	United Kingdom	2013–2016
Raising Dad	United States	2001–2002
Raising Hope	United States	2010–2014
Raju Rocket	Pakistan	2012–2013
Ramzor	Israel	2008–2014
Rango	United States	1967
Raven's Home	United States	2017–2023
Ready Steady Go	Pakistan	2017–2019
The Really Loud House	United States	2022–2024
The Real McCoys	United States	1957–1963
The Real O'Neals	United States	2016–2017
Real Rob	United States	2016–2017
The Redd Foxx Show	United States	1986
Reba	United States	2001–2007
Red Dwarf	United Kingdom	1988–1999, 2009–present
Reed Between the Lines	United States	2011; 2015
Regular Show	United States	2010–2017
Regular Show: The Lost Tapes	United States	2026–
Rel	United States	2018–2019
The Ren & Stimpy Show	United States	1991–1996
Ren & Stimpy "Adult Party Cartoon"	United States	2003
Reno 911!	United States	2003–2009; 2020–2022
Report to Murphy	United States	1982
Respectable	United Kingdom	2006
Resham Gali Ki Husna	Pakistan	2019–2020
Retired at 35	United States	2011–2012
The Revolting World of Stanley Brown	United Kingdom	2012
Rhoda	United States	1974–1978
Richie Rich	United States	2015
Rick and Morty	United States	2013–
Rick and Morty: The Anime	Japan/United States	2024–present
Rising Damp	United Kingdom	1974–1978, 1980
Rita and Wally	Australia	1968
Rita Rocks	United States	2008–2009
Rob	United States	2012
Robin's Nest	United Kingdom	1977–1981
Robot Chicken	United States	2005–2022
Robson Arms	Canada	2005, 2007
Rock Me Baby	United States	2003–2004
Rocko's Modern Life	United States	1993–1996, 2019 (special)
Rodney	United States	2004–2006
Roll Out	United States	1973–1974
Romantically Challenged	United States	2010
Romeo!	United States	2003–2006
Room 222	United States	1969–1974
Roommates	United States	2009
Rooster	United States	2026–present
The Ropers	United States	1979–1980
Roseanne	United States	1988–1997, 2018
Roy	United Kingdom	2009–2015
Royal Crackers	United States	2023–2024
The Royal Family	United States	1991–1992
The Royle Family	United Kingdom	1998–2000, 2006–2012 (specials)
Rubber Band	Pakistan	2005–2008
Rules of Engagement	United States	2007–2013
Run, Buddy, Run	United States	1966–1967

== S ==
Title	Country	Years
Sabrina the Teenage Witch	United States	1996–2003
Sadie J	United Kingdom	2011–2013
Sally	United States	1957–1958
Sam & Cat	United States	2013–2014
Samantha Who?	United States	2007–2009
Sam's Game	United Kingdom	2001
Sanford	United States	1980–1981
Sanford and Son	United States	1972–1977
Sanford Arms	United States	1977
Sara	United States	1985
Sarabhai vs Sarabhai	India	2004–2006
The Sarah Silverman Program	United States	2007–2010
Sausage Party: Foodtopia	United States/Canada	2024–present
Saved by the Bell	United States	1989–1993; 2020–2021
Saved by the Bell: The College Years	United States	1993–1994
Saved by the Bell: The New Class	United States	1993–2000
Scaredy Squirrel	Canada	2011–2013
Schitt's Creek	Canada	2015–2020
Schooled	United States	2019–2020
Scoop	United Kingdom	2009–2011
Scout's Safari	United States	2002–2004
Scrubs	United States	2001–2010; 2026–
Sean Saves the World	United States	2013–2014
Sean's Show	United Kingdom	1992–1993
The Second Hundred Years	United States	1967–1968
Second Time Around	United States	2004–2005
The Secret Diary of Desmond Pfeiffer	United States	1998
Secret Mountain Fort Awesome	United States	2011–2012
See Dad Run	United States	2012–2015
Seinfeld	United States	1989–1998
Senario	Malaysia	1996–2013
Selfie	United States	2014
Seven Periods with Mr Gormsby	New Zealand	2005–2006
Sex and the City	United States	1998–2004
Shameless	United Kingdom	2004–2013
Shake It Up	United States	2010–2013
Shaky Ground	United States	1992–1993
Shaping Up	United States	1984
Shararat	India	2003–2007
A Sharp Intake of Breath	United Kingdom	1978–1981
Shasta McNasty	United States	1999–2000
Shelley	United Kingdom	1979–1992
Shemesh	Israel	1997–2004
She the People	United States	2025
She's the Sheriff	United States	1987–1989
Shifting Gears	United States	2025–
The Shnookums & Meat Funny Cartoon Show	United States	1995
Show Me the Happy	Hong Kong	2010–2011
Shrimaan Shrimati	India	1995–1999
$#*! My Dad Says	United States	2010–2011
Siblings	United Kingdom	2014–2016
Side Hustle	United States	2020–2022
Silicon Valley	United States	2014–2019
Silver Spoons	United States	1982–1987
Simon	United States	1995–1996
The Simpsons	United States	1989–
The Single Guy	United States	1995–1997
Single Parents	United States	2018–2020
Sister, Sister	United States	1994–1999
Sit Down, Shut Up (2001 TV series)	Australia	2001
Sit Down, Shut Up (2009 TV series)	United States	2009
The Sitcom Trials	United Kingdom	2003
Skimo	Mexico	2006–2007
Slacker Cats	United States	2007–2009
Sliced	United Kingdom	2019–2021
Složna braća	Serbia	1995
A Small Problem	United Kingdom	1987
Small Wonder	United States	1985–1989
Smart Guy	United States	1997–1999
Smiling Friends	United States	2022–2026
The Smothers Brothers Show	United States	1965–1966
Soap	United States	1977–1981
So Awkward	United Kingdom	2015–2020
So Little Time	United States	2001–2002
Solar Opposites	United States	2020–2025
Some Day	Hong Kong	2010
Some Mothers Do 'Ave 'Em	United Kingdom	1973–1978
Some of My Best Friends	United States	2001
Sona Chandi	Pakistan	1982
Sonic Boom	United States/France	2014–2017
Son of Zorn	United States	2016–2017
Sonny with a Chance	United States	2009–2011
Sons & Daughters	United States	2006
Sons of Tucson	United States	2010
Sophie	Canada	2008–2009
Sorry!	United Kingdom	1981–1982, 1985–1988
The Soul Man	United States	2012–2016
Soul Man	United States	1997–1998
South Park	United States	1997–
Space Goofs	France	1997–1998; 2005–2006
Spaced	United Kingdom	1999–2001
Sparks	United States	1996–1998
Speechless	United States	2016–2019
Spin City	United States	1996–2002
Splitting Up Together	United States	2018–2019
SpongeBob SquarePants	United States	1999–
Sports Night	United States	1998–2000
Square Pegs	United States	1982–1983
Squidbillies	United States	2005–2021
Stacked	United States	2005–2006
Stanley	United States	1956–1957
Star of the Family	United States	1982
State of Georgia	United States	2011
Step by Step	United States	1991–1998
Steptoe and Son	United Kingdom	1962–1974
The Steve Harvey Show	United States	1996–2002
Still Game	United Kingdom	2002–2007; 2016–2019
Still the King	United States	2016–2017
Still Open All Hours	United Kingdom	2013–present
Still Standing	United States	2002–2006
Stoked	Canada	2009–2013
Stone Quackers	United States	2014–2015
Stressed Eric	United Kingdom	1998–2000
Stromberg	Germany	2004–2012
Stuck in the Middle	United States	2016–2018
Stupid, Stupid Man	Australia	2006–2008
Style & Substance	United States	1998
Suburgatory	United States	2011–2014
Suddenly Susan	United States	1996–2000
Sugar Time!	United States	1977–1978
The Suite Life of Zack & Cody	United States	2005–2008
The Suite Life on Deck	United States	2008–2011
Summer Heights High	Australia	2007
Sunshine	United States	1975
Supah Ninjas	United States	2011–2013
The Super	United States	1972
Superior Donuts	United States	2017–2018
SuperMansion	United States	2015–2019
Superstore	United States	2015–2021
Surviving Suburbia	United States	2009
Svensson, Svensson	Sweden	1994–1996, 2007–2008
Swift and Shift Couriers	Australia	2008–2011
Sydney	United States	1990
Sydney to the Max	United States	2019–2021
Szysznyk	United States	1977–1978

== T ==
Title	Country	Years
Taarak Mehta Ka Ooltah Chashmah	India	2008–present
The Tab Hunter Show	United States	1960–1961
Tabitha	United States	1977–1978
Taina	United States	2001–2002
Takkay Ki Ayegi Baraat	Pakistan	2011
Tammy	United States	1965–1966
Tarantula	United States	2017
Tattingers	United States	1989
Taxi	United States	1978–1983
Taz-Mania	United States	1991-1995
Teen Bata Teen	Pakistan	1995
Teachers (2006 TV series)	United States	2006
Teachers (2016 TV series)	United States	2016–2019
Teachers Only	United States	1982
Teacher's Pet	United States	2000–2002
The Ted Knight Show	United States	1978
Teenage Euthanasia	United States	2021–2023
Temperatures Rising	United States	1972–1974
Telenovela	United States	2015–2016
Ten Year Old Tom	United States	2021
Terry and June	United Kingdom	1979–1987
Tetangga Masa Gitu	Indonesia	2014–2017
The Texas Wheelers	United States	1974–1975
That '70s Show	United States	1998–2006
That '80s Show	United States	2002
That '90s Show	United States	2023–2024
That Girl	United States	1966–1971
That Girl Lay Lay	United States	2021–2024
That Wonderful Guy	United States	1949–1950
That's My Boy	United Kingdom	1981–1986
That's My Bush!	United States	2001
That's My Mama	United States	1974–1975
That's So Raven	United States	2003–2007
The Thick of It	United Kingdom	2005–2012
Thicker than Water	United States	1973
This Country	United Kingdom	2017–2020
Three's a Crowd	United States	1984–1985
Three's Company	United States	1977–1984
Throb	United States	1986–1988
The Thundermans	United States	2013–2018
'Til Death	United States	2006–2010
Till Death...	United Kingdom	1981
Till Death Us Do Part	United Kingdom	1965–1975
Til Love Do Us Lie	Hong Kong	2011–2012
Timmy G	Pakistan	2011
The Tim Conway Show	United States	1970
Titus	United States	2000–2002
Toast of London	United Kingdom	2013–2015
To Rome with Love	United States	1969–1971
Tom, Dick and Mary	United States	1964–1965
The Tom Ewell Show	United States	1960–1961
Tom Goes to the Mayor	United States	2004–2006
The Tony Randall Show	United States	1976–1978
Too Close for Comfort	United States	1980–1987
Top Cat	United States	1961–1962
Top of the Heap	United States	1991
Top lista nadrealista	Bosnia and Herzegovina	1984–1991
Topper	United States	1953–1955
The Torkelsons	United States	1991–1993
The Tortellis	United States	1987
A Touch of Grace	United States	1973
Trafika	Slovenia	2003–2004
Trailer Park Boys	Canada	2001–2007, 2014–present
Treis Harites, Oi	Greece	1990–1992
Trial & Error	United States	2017–2018
Tripper's Day	United Kingdom	1984
The Trouble with Normal	United States	2000
The Trouble with Tracy	Canada	1970–1971
True Colors	United States	1990–1992
True Jackson, VP	United States	2008–2011
Tuca & Bertie	United States	2019–2021
Türkisch für Anfänger	Germany	2006–2008
Turnabout	United States	1979
TV dober dan	Slovenia	1999–2002
Tweets for My Sweet	Philippines	2012
Twenty Good Years	United States	2006
Twenty Twelve	United Kingdom	2011–2012
Twins	United States	2005–2006
The Twisted Tales of Felix the Cat	United States	1995–1997
Two and a Half Men	United States	2003–2015
Two Doors Down	United Kingdom	2013–present
Two Guys and a Girl (Two Guys, a Girl and a Pizza Place)	United States	1998–2001
Two In Clover	United Kingdom	1969–1970
Two of a Kind	United States	1998–1999
Two's Company	United Kingdom	1975–1979
Two Pints of Lager and a Packet of Crisps	United Kingdom	2001–2011
Tyler Perry's House of Payne	United States	2006, 2007–2012; 2020–
Tyler Perry's Meet the Browns	United States	2009–2011
Tyler Perry's Young Dylan	United States	2020−2025
Thatteem Mutteem	India	2011–present

== U ==
Title	Country	Years
Uff Meri Family	Pakistan	2014
Ugly Americans	United States	2010–2012
The Ugliest Girl in Town	United States	1968–1969
Unbreakable Kimmy Schmidt	United States	2014–2019, 2020 special
Uncle	United Kingdom	2014–2017
Undateable	United States	2014–2016
Undergrads	Canada/United States	2001–2002
Unfabulous	United States	2004–2007
Unhappily Ever After	United States	1995–1999
Unhitched	United States	2008
The Unicorn	United States	2019–2021
Union Square	United States	1997–1998
Universal Basic Guys	United States	2024–
Unsupervised	United States	2012
Up All Night	United States	2011–2012
Up Pompeii!	United Kingdom	1969–1970; 1975; 1991
The Upper Hand	United Kingdom	1990–1996
Uppum Mulakum	India	2015–present
Upstart Crow	United Kingdom	2016–present
USA High	United States	1997–1999

== V ==
Title	Country	Years
Valentine's Day	United States	1964–1965
Vampirina: Teenage Vampire	United States	2025–2026
The Van Dyke Show	United States	1988
Vecinos	Mexico	2005–2010
Veep	United States	2012–2019
Velma	United States	2023–2024
Veronica's Closet	United States	1997–2000
The Vicar of Dibley	United Kingdom	1994–2000; 2004; 2006–2007; Comic Relief specials
Vicious	United Kingdom	2013–2016
Victorious	United States	2010–2013
Vinnie & Bobby	United States	1992
Virtues of Harmony	Hong Kong	2001–2002
Virtues of Harmony II	Hong Kong	2003–2005
Viva S Club	United Kingdom	2002
Viva Valdez	United States	1976
Viza za budućnost	Bosnia and Herzegovina	2002–2008
Vrtičkarji	Slovenia	1998–2001

== W ==
Title	Country	Years
W1A	United Kingdom	2014–2017
Wait Till Your Father Gets Home	United States	1972–1974
Waiting for God	United Kingdom	1990–1994
Walang Matigas na Pulis sa Matinik na Misis	Philippines	2023–present
Wanda at Large	United States	2003
The War at Home	United States	2005–2007
War of the Genders	Hong Kong	2000
Warren	United Kingdom	2019
Watching Ellie	United States	2002–2003
The Waverly Wonders	United States	1978
The Wayans Bros.	United States	1995–1999
We Can Be Heroes: Finding the Australian of the Year	Australia	2005
We Got It Made	United States	1983–1988
We'll Get By	United States	1975
We've Got Each Other	United States	1977
Webster	United States	1983–1987
Weeds	United States	2005–2012
Welcome Back, Kotter	United States	1975–1979
Welcome Freshmen	United States	1991–1994
Welcome to the Captain	United States	2008
Welcome to the House	Hong Kong	2006–2007
Welcome to New York	United States	2000–2001
Wendell & Vinnie	United States	2013
Wendy and Me	United States	1964–1965
What a Dummy	United States	1990
What I Like About You	United States	2002–2006
What's Happening!!	United States	1976–1979
What's Happening Now!!	United States	1985–1988
Whatever Happened to the Likely Lads?	United Kingdom	1973–1976
What We Do in the Shadows	United States	2019–2024
When Things Were Rotten	United States	1975
Where's Huddles?	United States	1970
Where I Live	United States	1993
White Gold	United Kingdom	2017–2019
White Van Man	United Kingdom	2011–2012
Whitney	United States	2011−2013
Whoopi	United States	2003–2004
Who's the Boss?	United States	1984–1992
Who's Watching the Kids?	United States	1978
Wild Life	United States	2020
Will & Grace	United States	1998–2006, 2017–2020
Willing and Abel	Australia	1987
Willy	United States	1954–1955
Window on Main Street	United States	1961–1962
The Windsors	United Kingdom	2016–present
The Winner	United States	2007
Wings	United States	1990–1997
Wizards of Waverly Place	United States	2007–2012
Wizards Beyond Waverly Place	United States	2024–2026
WKRP in Cincinnati	United States	1978–1982
Women of the House	United States	1995
The Wonder Years	United States	1988–1993
Woops!	United States	1992
Workaholics	United States	2011–2017
The Work Experience	United Kingdom	2012
Working	United States	1997–1999
Working It Out	United States	1990
Working Stiffs	United States	1979
World of Pub	United Kingdom	2001
Worst Week	United States	2008–2009
The Worst Week of My Life	United Kingdom	2004–2006
Wyatt's Watchdogs	United Kingdom	1988

== Y ==
Title	Country	Years
Yanks Go Home	United Kingdom	1976–1977
A Year at the Top	United States	1977
Yeh Jo Hai Zindagi	India	1986
Yes, Dear	United States	2000–2006
Yes, Honestly	United Kingdom	1976–1977
Yes Minister	United Kingdom	1980–1984
Yes, Prime Minister	United Kingdom	1986–1988
Yonderland	United Kingdom	2013–2016
You Again?	United States	1986–1987
You Take the Kids	United States	1990–1991
You Must Be The Husband	United Kingdom	1987–1988
Young at Heart	United Kingdom	1980–1982
Young, Gifted and Broke	United Kingdom	1989
Young & Hungry	United States	2014–2018
Young Love	United States	1949-1950
The Young Ones	United Kingdom	1982–1984
The Young Person's Guide to Becoming a Rock Star	United Kingdom	1998
Young Sheldon	United States	2017–2024
You Rang, M'Lord?	United Kingdom	1988–1993
Your Pretty Face Is Going to Hell	United States	2013–2019
You're Only Young Twice	United Kingdom	1977–1981
You're Only Young Twice (1971 TV series)	United Kingdom	1971
Yus, My Dear	United Kingdom	1976

== Z ==
Title	Country	Years
Zabaan Sambhalke	India	1993–1994, 1997–1998
Zamani Manzil Kay Maskharay	Pakistan	2017–present
Zach Stone Is Gonna Be Famous	United States	2013
Zapped	United Kingdom	2016–2018
Zeke and Luther	United States	2009–2012
Zoe, Duncan, Jack and Jane	United States	1999–2000
Zoey 101	United States	2005–2008
Zorro and Son	United States	1983

== See also ==
- List of comedy television series
- List of single-camera situation comedies
- List of situation comedies with LGBT characters
- List of teen sitcoms
