= Terry Tweed =

Canadian actor, playwright and theatre director

- Born: March 23, 1943 (age 83)
- Occupations: Actress, playwright, theatre director

Terry Tweed (born 23 March 1943 in Toronto, Ontario, Canada) is a Canadian actress, playwright and theatre director from Toronto, Ontario.

== Career ==
Primarily known as a stage actress, her roles have included productions of Balconville, Blood Relations, Romeo and Juliet, The Glace Bay Miners' Museum, Driving Miss Daisy, Another Home Invasion, Over the River and Through the Woods, Homechild, Orpheus Descending, The Comedy of Errors and Happy Days, while she has directed productions of Blood Brothers, The Women, Arcadia, Gypsy, Salt-Water Moon, Our Town and Albertine in Five Times.

She also starred in the television sitcoms Delilah and The Baxters, and as Lillian Massey in the 1978 television film The Masseys, as well as making guest appearances on Katts and Dog, Street Legal and Skins.

She was cowriter of two plays, Lockhartville (an adaptation of Alden Nowlan's novel Various Persons Named Kevin O'Brien) and On My Own Two Feet.

She is a former professor of theatre at the University of Ottawa, and a former president of the Canadian Actors' Equity Association. She currently teaches theatre at Humber College and at the Birmingham Conservatory of the Stratford Festival.
