= The Pit (1981 film) =

The Pit Teddy
- Canadian Theatrical Poster
- Directed by: Lew Lehman
- Written by: Ian A. Stuart
- Produced by: Bennet Fode; John F. Bassett
- Starring: Sammy Snyders; Jeannie Elias
- Cinematography: Manfred Guthe
- Edited by: Rik Morden
- Music by: Victor Davies
- Distributed by: Amulet Pictures/Ambassador Film Distributors (Canada)
- Release date: October 23, 1981 (Canada)
- Running time: 101 minutes
- Country: Canada
- Language: English
- Budget: CAD $900,000

The Pit (also known as Teddy) is a 1981 Canadian horror film starring Sammy Snyders and Jeannie Elias. Although it is a Canadian production, it was actually filmed in Beaver Dam, Wisconsin. The pit itself was filmed in Waupun, Wisconsin.

== Plot ==
Jamie Benjamin is a misfit 12-year-old boy from Toronto, Canada who serves as the whipping boy of his classmates, the other kids in the city, and the grandmothers who live in Wisconsin. When he encounters other people, they tease and ridicule him. His only friend is a stuffed bear named Teddy, with whom he regularly holds conversations. The audience hears Teddy's voice as he talks to Jamie.

On the cusp of puberty, Jamie develops an unhealthy obsession with girls. Thus, when his parents go away on a business trip and leave the attractive psychology student Sandy O'Reilly to babysit him, he falls completely in love with her. His lust for her is first revealed when he drops his napkin at the dinner table and when he reaches for it, he uses the opportunity to look at Sandy's panties.

During one of his conversations with Sandy, Jamie asks her if she can keep a secret. Jamie reveals that in the forest, he has found a pit full of mysterious creatures, which he calls "Trogs", which he takes care of by feeding them raw meat. He steals money from Sandy's purse in order to obtain meat for the creatures. Teddy suggests feeding the people who tormented him to the Trogs, and Jamie takes his advice. After he runs out of people, he takes Sandy to the pit, where she accidentally falls in and is eaten by the monsters. Heartbroken and angry, Jamie lowers a rope into the pit, and the Trogs escape. After rampaging through the countryside, they are tracked down and chased back to their pit, where they are shot by the local militia and buried in it. In order to avoid panic, the killings are blamed on "wild dogs". Jamie goes to live with his grandparents, where he meets a girl named Alicia who says she will be his friend. The film ends with Alicia tricking Jamie into following her into the woods, where she pushes him into her own pit.

== Cast ==
- Sammy Snyders as Jamie Benjamin
- Jeannie Elias as Sandy O'Reilly
- Sonja Smits as Mrs. Lynde
- Laura Hollingsworth as Marg Livingstone
- Richard Alden as Mr. Benjamin
- John Auten as Library Janitor
- Laura Press as Mrs. Benjamin
- Paul Grisham as Freddy
- Wendy Schmidt as Christina
- Allison Tye as Alicia
- Edith Bedker as Louise

== Production ==
Ian A. Stuart's original screenplay was considerably different from the final film. In his screenplay, Jamie was 8 or 9 years old and the Tra-la-logs were figments of his imagination. When Lew Lehman signed on to direct, he made Jamie older, the monsters real and added more humor to the original script. Stuart has expressed dissatisfaction with the final result.

== Reception ==
The film received mixed reviews from critics. It is currently ranked as a 42% "freshness" rating on Rotten Tomatoes. Due to its unusual premise and Sammy Snyders' effective performance, it has retained a small cult following.

== Novelization ==
Teddy by John Gault is a novelization of the film published in 1980. It appears to adhere closer to Ian A. Stuart's original screenplay than the finished film, containing more character development and a far darker tone.
