= Sam Snyders =

Canadian actor

Sam Snyders (also known as "Sammy Snyders"), is a former television and film child actor from Canada.

He is best known for his role as Tom Sawyer in the 1979 Canadian television series, Huckleberry Finn and His Friends, alongside Ian Tracey who played Huckleberry Finn, and for his role as Jamie Benjamin in the 1981 horror film The Pit.

In 1980, Snyders starred on the second season of the nationally syndicated American situation comedy, The Baxters. On the series, Snyders played Gregg Baxter, the son of an average middle-class family living in a suburb of St. Louis. Originally produced by Norman Lear in its first season, the series was the first "interactive sitcom" of its kind, wherein the first half of each 30-minute episode presented a vignette dramatizing the events in the lives of the Baxter family, and the second half was an "instant analysis" talk show segment, giving a live studio audience and guests an opportunity to express their opinions about the topic being presented that week.

Snyders also produced specials for the Canadian Broadcasting Corporation, and performed on stage in A Chorus Line and Oliver Twist.

Snyders is a dance teacher. Since November 2006, he has been the elected president of union local 1996 of Unifor (formerly the Communication, Energy, and Paper workers Union).
