= Huckleberry Finn and His Friends =

1979 television series

- German DVD cover; from left to right: Tom Sawyer (Sammy Snyders), Huck Finn (Ian Tracey)
- Starring: Ian Tracey; Sam Snyders; Blu Mankuma; Brigitte Horney
- Countries of origin: Canada, West Germany
- No. of episodes: 26

Production
- Running time: 25 minutes approx.
- Production companies: Madison Pacific Film; Wagner-Hallig Film

Original release
- Network: CTV (Canada), BBC (UK), The Family Channel (US)
- Release: 1979

Huckleberry Finn and His Friends is a 1979 television series documenting the exploits of Huckleberry Finn and Tom Sawyer, based on the novels The Adventures of Tom Sawyer (1876) and Adventures of Huckleberry Finn (1884) by American writer Mark Twain. The series contains 26 episodes and was a Canadian/West German international co-production.

== Plot ==
No other adaptation has run to this episode length (roughly 13 episodes per book, representing over twelve hours in total) and consequently this series remains the most comprehensive of all the many filmed versions of both books.

Although each episode of the series credits different storywriters, the narratives are in fact directly adapted from Twain's books. In some cases, the dialogue is identical (e.g. Tom answering “David and Goliath” when asked for names of the Apostles). The single largest difference is the repositioning of characters in the narrative to accommodate the storylines. For instance, in The Adventures of Tom Sawyer, Huck and Becky Thatcher do not appear until Chapter 6, but this adaptation introduces them earlier (Huck from the first episode, Becky in the second). The most heavily abbreviated section is the extended adventures of the Duke and Dauphin in the later chapters of Adventures of Huckleberry Finn. These chapters are simply omitted from the television series.

Unsurprisingly, some original elements of Twain's stories are removed (e.g. the racial slurs, Huck's smoking, Pap's drunkenness and violence) however just as surprising is what is retained: Jim makes an early appearance in the series, referring to Tom Sawyer as “Master Tom”, and the fact of his status as a slave and his monetary value are presented comparatively casually, as is Colonel Grangerford assigning Huck his own slave. Similarly, although Huck is not shown discovering the dead bodies of Buck Grangerford and his brother, several scenes in the same vein are included. The murder of the doctor in the graveyard, Injun Joe's death in the sealed cave, and the discovery of the dead body in the floating remains of the house (ultimately revealed as Pap) all appear, rather unexpectedly in a children's series.

== Cast ==
- Ian Tracey as Huckleberry Finn/Narrator
- Sam Snyders as Tom Sawyer
- Brigitte Horney as Aunt Polly
- Dinah Hinz as Aunt Sally
- Hagan Beggs as Pap Finn
- Bernie Coulson as Sid Sawyer
- Dale Walters as Joe Harper
- Gunnar Möller as Constable Miller
- Alex Diakun as Indian Joe
- Heinz Schimmelpfennig as The Duke

== Episodes ==
Episode Title	Book	Chapters
1. Welcome Neighbour	The Adventures of Tom Sawyer	Chapters 1 & 4
2. Love in Bloom	The Adventures of Tom Sawyer	Chapters 2–4
3. The Engagement	The Adventures of Tom Sawyer	Chapters 6 & 7
4. Mystery at Midnight	The Adventures of Tom Sawyer	Chapters 6, 9–11
5. The Pirates	The Adventures of Tom Sawyer	Chapter 13
6. How Nice to Be Missed	The Adventures of Tom Sawyer	Chapter 14
7. Such a Lovely Funeral	The Adventures of Tom Sawyer	Chapters 15, 16 & 18
8. Muff Potter's Trial	The Adventures of Tom Sawyer	Chapter 24
9. Buried Treasure	The Adventures of Tom Sawyer	Chapters 26–29
10. Huck Is a Hero	The Adventures of Tom Sawyer	Chapters 30–32
11. The Millionaires	The Adventures of Tom Sawyer	Chapters 32–34
12. I Want to Be Free	The Adventures of Tom Sawyer	Chapters 34–36
12. I Want to Be Free	Adventures of Huckleberry Finn	Chapters 1–2
13. Huck Becomes the Victim	Adventures of Huckleberry Finn	Chapters 3–5
14. Huck Gets Away	Adventures of Huckleberry Finn	Chapters 7–8
15. Huck Finds Jim	Adventures of Huckleberry Finn	Chapters 8–9
16. The Rains Come	Adventures of Huckleberry Finn	Chapters 9–11
17. Smallpox	Adventures of Huckleberry Finn	Chapters 12–16
18. Meet the Grangerfords	Adventures of Huckleberry Finn	Chapters 17–18
19. The Thing About Feudin'	Adventures of Huckleberry Finn	Chapter 18
20. The End of the Feud	Adventures of Huckleberry Finn	Chapters 18–19
21. Meet the Duke And Dauphin	Adventures of Huckleberry Finn	Chapters 19–20
22. Romeo, Where Art Thou	Adventures of Huckleberry Finn	Chapters 20–23
23. Jim Disappears	Adventures of Huckleberry Finn	Chapters 31–32
24. Huck Sawyer - Tom Finn	Adventures of Huckleberry Finn	Chapters 33–34
25. The Rescue	Adventures of Huckleberry Finn	Chapters 35–40
26. The Whole Truth	Adventures of Huckleberry Finn	Chapters 41–43

== Production ==
=== Filming ===
The series was directed by Jack B. Hively and Ken Jubenvill.

Huckleberry Finn and His Friends was filmed on location at the Burnaby Village Museum (then known as the Heritage Village) in Burnaby, British Columbia. Episode 9 - Buried treasure - was filmed in part at the Alaksen National Wildlife Area.

=== Sternwheelers ===
Various sternwheeler riverboats appear in the series. The Julia Belle Swain appears in the opening and closing credits, and are the only scenes that were shot on the Mississippi River.

The wooden steam-powered sternwheeler in episode 6 - How nice to be missed - and 7 - Such a lovely funeral - is the "Samson V". The "Samson V" is now a museum but at the time (1979) was a working snagpuller on the Fraser River. The small sternwheeler in episode 10 - Huck is a hero - was one of an identical pair of boats built in 1964 that ferried tourists around Vancouver's harbour from the 1960s to the 1980s. From the late 1980s until 1999, the "Scenic Bell" and the "Scenic Queen" ferried passengers to Newcastle Island Marine Provincial Park.

== Broadcast ==
The series was broadcast in the United Kingdom, Germany, Ireland, Belgium, the Netherlands, Finland, Sweden, Denmark, Norway, Australia, Canada, South Africa Israel, and various as Latin America countries.

In the United Kingdom, it was first screened on BBC1 in 1982 in the early evening children's television slot. It was repeated in 1984 in the same slot, and again the following year as part of early morning school holiday broadcasts.

== Home media ==
In 2007, the complete series was released as a 4 DVD box set by Fabulous Films in the UK. It contains many extras including a 12-page colour booklet and a 30-minute 'making of' documentary featuring interviews with many stars of the series including Sammy Snyders, Ian Tracey, and Blu Mankuma.
