= New School (TV series) =

Italian TV series

- Genre: Sitcom
- Directed by: Edoardo Palma; Emanuele Gaetano Forte
- Starring: Matteo Valentini; Cloe Romagnoli; Edoardo Tarantini; Diego Delpiano; Alberto Torquati; Federica Fabiani; Noemi Brazzoli; Alice Papes; Andrea Castronovo; Paolo Castronovo; Nicole Di Julio; Riccardo Diana
- Country of origin: Italy
- Original language: Italian
- No. of seasons: 3
- No. of episodes: 78

Production
- Executive producers: Alba Chiara Rondelli; Danilo Giuseppe Cerminara; Valentina Vezzoli
- Running time: 15 minutes
- Production companies: DeA Kids; Beachwood Canyon Productions; Maestro Production

Original release
- Network: DeA Kids; Super!
- Release: 11 December 2017

New School is an Italian sitcom television series produced by DeA Kids in collaboration with Beachwood Canyon Productions and Maestro Production. The series started in December 2017. In 2019 BBC made an accord with DeAgostini and, in the future, the series will also air in other countries.

== Plot ==
The series talks about the adventures of a group of freshmen of the McGaffin International Middle School, an international middle school in which there is a legendary flush toilet. This is a broken flush toilet in which is kept the Wall of Celebrities, a wall on which are hung the photos of the 12 Legends of the school, that are the most popular students that during the course of the years were able to accomplish feats so memorable to become myths. To become part of the Wall of Celebrities, students need to accomplish feats and be voted by other students through an app called App of the Wall of Celebrities. Only who will receive one million of points will be able to be part of the Wall of Celebrities.

== Cast and characters ==
- Matteo Valentini as Nick Rivellini, an 11-year-old boy who wants to be on the Wall to be more popular and overcome his insecurity. He is friends with Rudy and has an unreciprocated crush on Anna. He is very good at singing but terrible at dancing.
- Edoardo Tarantini as Rudy Hansen, an 11-year-old boy who is friend with Nick, whom he knows from when they were in kindergarten together. He is also the older brother of Alice. He is bungling, but quite creative and very kind despite a little childish. He is not very much interested in popularity and girls but he is very passionate about sci-fi movies and superheroes, and his favorite superhero is Ragazzo Lupo. He is hopeless at singing but very good at dancing and he has a web channel on which he publishes his dance tutorials.
- Cloe Romagnoli as Anna De Martino, a 12-year-old girl who is a friend of Nick and Rudy and who is in love with Justin. She is quite intelligent and pragmatic, but her love for Justin has her very easily distracted.
- Noemi Brazzoli as Vivien Mandelli, a 12-year-old girl very popular in school and who is always reliably in the first position on the App. Thanks to her popularity, almost no one dares to contradict her. She is also the head cheerleader. She is very egocentric and self-regarding and always refers to herself in third person and often takes selfies. In the first season, she starts to date Justin, not much for love but just because she thinks that it is natural that the most attractive girl would date the most attractive boy. She is allergic to cats.
- Diego Delpiano as Justin Price, a 12-year-old boy who is very popular. He loves sports and takes care of his looks, and constantly exercises to be in good shape and develop muscles, but he is not very intelligent and is quite naïve. He has a teddy bear, Orso. He also has some immature mannerisms like being afraid of darkness, still needing to keep his teddy bear near him to sleep and sometimes he starts to laugh unprompted.
- Alice Papes as Alice Hansen, a 9-year-old girl, little sister of Rudy and a genius. She spends time in the lab often doing research, and is able come up with surprising inventions and cutting-edge scientific research. She still sleeps with her stuffed animal, Piripicchio, but she wishes to be more included and to have friends.
- Andrea Castronovo and Paolo Castronovo as Tim and Tom, two identical twins. They don't study much but thanks to their cunning, physical strength and coordination are almost always able to obtain what they wish and compensate for their lack of study by cheating. Despite not being interested in being part of the Wall, they often challenge others, especially Nick and Rudy, for fun. They are almost impossible to distinguish from each other, but, Tim is allergic to cats and Tom is not.
- Nicole Di Julio as Charlotte. She started to appear during the second season. She is a gruff bully and is able to scare everyone, included the principal, and her only weak spot is her big crush on Nick, that she nicknamed Sogliola.
- Alberto Torquati as Mr. Peter Spencer, the principal of the school. He tries to adopt a rigid and severe attitude with his students despit them not respecting him much. Precisely for this reason, the best way to get something from him is to congratulate and flatter him. Mr. Spencer has only ways to control his students: to send them to his office as punishment and seize their belongings. He is scared of the superintendent. He has many hobbies and passions, like baking, but his life outside of school is mysterious. Mr. Spencer loves traditions and the story of the school, the rites, the special days, and the ceremonies. He holds the founder of the school, Mr. McGaffin, in high regard. One of his duties is to give the announcements at the start of the day over intercom.
- Federica Fabiani as Miss Mastermind, the cook of the school. She is a very cold woman and doesn't smile very often. She also treats the students with sarcasm often, but the reason behind her attitude is that in the past, she had a romance with Mr. Spencer that didn't end well.
- Riccardo Diana as the superintendent. He never appears physically but he is heard during calls. He controls the work of the school.

== Episodes ==
| Season | Episodes | Original air |
|---|---|---|
| Season 1 | 26 | 2017-2018 |
| Season 2 | 26 | 2018-2019 |
| Season 3 | 26 | 2019-2020 |

== Soundtrack ==
The theme song of the series is My New School, written and composed by Teresa Pascarelli and Giovanni Maria Lori and sung by Matteo Valentini.

In the episode of the first season "il Vivienfest", Nick, Anna and Rudy perform in the fictitious robes of the Bandos. Let the Music in is presented, an unreleased song written by Teresa Pascarelli and Giovanni Maria Lori and sung by Matteo Valentini.

In the episode of the first season "Il grande talent show", Rudy (out of tune) sings in playback Listen to Me, actually sung by Nick: it is an unpublished song written by Teresa Pascarelli and Giovanni Maria Lori and sung by Matteo Valentini

In the second season episode "Il ballo di San Valentino - Seconda parte", the young singer Matteo Markus Bok performs with his hit In the Middle.

In the second season episode "Vita da rocker" Nick, Rudy and Vivien perform as the rock group "Gli schiaffi" with their biggest hit Slaps, an unpublished song written and composed by Teresa Pascarelli and Giovanni Maria Lori and sung by Matteo Valentini.
