= Hotel Poldruga zvezdica =

Slovenian television series

Hotel Poldruga zvezdica is a Slovenian television series.

== Cast ==
- Lara Jankovič
- Aleš Valič
- Uroš Fürst
- Janko Petrovec
- Aleksandra Balmazovič
- Jernej Kuntner
- Zvezdana Mlakar
