= Delilah (Canadian TV series) =

- Genre: Sitcom
- Written by: Bryan Barney
- Directed by: Ron Meraska; Jack Sampson
- Starring: Terry Tweed; Miles McNamara; Barbara Hamilton
- Country of origin: Canada
- Original language: English
- No. of seasons: 1
- No. of episodes: 13

Production
- Producer: David Peddie
- Running time: 30 minutes

Original release
- Network: CBC Television
- Release: 4 October 1973 – 3 January 1974

Delilah is a Canadian sitcom television series that aired on CBC Television from 1973 to 1974.

== Premise ==
Delilah marked the CBC's first primetime sitcom, having aired its previous sitcom Toby during the day.

Delilah (Terry Tweed) moves out of the city and becomes a small community's first female barber. Her barbershop was intended to be given to her younger brother Vincent (Miles McNamara), but he must first graduate from school.

Other series characters include Delilah's Aunt Peggy (Barbara Hamilton), the town's newspaper editor T.J. (Eric House), family friend Franny Tree (Peter Mews), Frances (Kay Hawtrey), Mavis (Joyce Gordon) and Isabel (Paulle Clark).

== Production ==
Delilah was recorded before a live studio audience. Six of the episodes were written by Bryan Barney under script editor Jean Templeton.

== Scheduling ==
This half-hour series was broadcast on Thursdays at 9:00 p.m. (Eastern) from 4 October 1973 to 3 January 1974.

== Reception ==
The series generally received poor reviews and negative audience reception. It was cancelled after a single 13-episode season. However, CBC's next sitcom, King of Kensington, fared much better and became a multi-year success. Toronto Star television critic Jim Bawden declared the series as "Worst Canadian Sitcom", declaring the scriptwriting to be "appalling" and discovered an absence of laughter from the audience when he attended a taping of an episode.
