= The Baxters =

American-Canadian television series

- Season 1 title card
- Created by: Hubert Jessup
- Developed by: Norman Lear
- Starring: Season 1: Larry Keith; Anita Gillette; Derin Altay; Chris Petersen; Terri Lynn Wood; Season 2: Sean McCann; Terry Tweed; Marianne McIsaac; Sammy Snyders; Megan Follows
- Theme music composer: Marvin Laird
- Countries of origin: United States; Canada
- Original language: English
- No. of seasons: 2
- No. of episodes: 50

Production
- Executive producers: Season 1: Norman Lear; Season 2: Chet Collier
- Producers: Season 1: Fern Field; Season 2: Wendell Wilkes
- Camera setup: Multi-camera
- Running time: 25 minutes
- Production companies: T.A.T. Communications Company (season 1); Wilks and Close Productions (season 2); CHCH-TV (season 2); BBI Communications

Original release
- Network: Syndication
- Release: September 1979 – August 1981

The Baxters is a sitcom that aired in broadcast syndication from September 1979 to August 1981. The original American incarnation of the series aired locally from 1977 to 1979 on the Boston station WCVB-TV; in 1979, Norman Lear took over production, and a recast version aired nationally in the 1979–80 television season. Facing cancellation, the series was then acquired by a Canadian firm who moved the production to Toronto, Ontario and recast it again; it lasted one more season as a Canadian series before ending its run in 1981. It is not to be confused with the 2018–2019 Lightworkers Media television series of that name based on the novels of Karen Kingsbury and starring Roma Downey.

The series was the first "interactive" sitcom, depicting a middle-class St. Louis family. Each 30-minute episode was split into two parts; the first half was a vignette dramatizing the events in the lives of the Baxter family, and the second was a live studio audience "talk show" segment where audiences were given the opportunity to participate and voice their opinions about the issues raised in that week's episode.

== Synopsis ==
The original run on WCVB featured married couple Stanley and Susan Baxter, their children Dennis and Amy, plus Grandma Lizzie. Stan was a high school shop teacher, while Susan was enrolled in night school. Dennis was in college and Amy in high school.

During the first season as a nationally-syndicated program, the Baxters were an "average" middle-class family living in a suburb of St. Louis, Missouri. Fred Baxter (Larry Keith) was an insurance salesman and Nancy (Anita Gillette) a housewife and mother. Naomi (Derin Altay) was their adopted 19-year-old daughter; Jonah (Chris Petersen) was their 14-year-old son; and their youngest, Rachel (Terri Lynn Wood), was their 10-year-old daughter. The series followed the Baxter family as they dealt with various important and, in some cases, controversial, issues of the day. In one episode they were faced with whether to commit Mother Baxter to a nursing home; in another, whether the fact that Jonah's teacher was a homosexual would harm their son; and in another, Fred faced a dilemma over whether to turn a small, money-losing apartment house he owned into condominiums, thus forcing out some of the tenants.

The second season featured an all new cast as another Baxter family; Jim Baxter (Sean McCann) became a schoolteacher and his wife Susan Baxter (Terry Tweed) returned to work. Their kids were now 19-year-old Allison (Marianne McIsaac), 14-year-old Gregg (Sammy Snyders) and 10-year-old Lucy (Megan Follows).

The format in all three versions was essentially the same. Unlike most other sitcoms, each episode was open-ended, the first half of each episode being a vignette featuring the Baxter family and presenting a situation or dilemma they faced, and the second half, an "instant analysis" talk-show format, giving a live studio audience and guests a chance to talk about the topic being presented. Stations carrying the show could choose between producing their own discussion segments locally, or presenting a national version of the segment which, during its first season, was produced in Los Angeles, and in its second season, Toronto. The discussion moderator in the second segment was different in each city, and in some local markets, viewers were invited to call in and voice their reactions.

== Cast ==
=== On WCVB ===
- Frank Dolan as Stanley Baxter
- Anita Sangiolo as Susan Baxter
- Scott Evans as Dennis Baxter
- Tiki Furho as Amy Baxter
- Harriet Rogers as Grandma Lizzie

=== Season 1 ===
- Larry Keith as Fred Baxter
- Anita Gillette as Nancy Baxter
- Derin Altay as Naomi Baxter
- Chris Petersen as Jonah Baxter
- Terri Lynn Wood as Rachael Baxter

=== Season 2 ===
- Sean McCann as Jim Baxter
- Terry Tweed as Susan Baxter
- Marianne McIsaac as Allison Baxter
- Sammy Snyders as Gregg Baxter
- Megan Follows as Lucy Baxter

== Production ==
The program originally began as a local production at WCVB-TV Boston, in early 1977, where it had been created by a former divinity student named Hubert Jessup as part of his Sunday morning public-affairs show. Jessup persuaded station management to try it in the early evening, where it gained a loyal following. During the WCVB-produced seasons, before syndication, the initial cast was primarily composed of local Boston actors.

After two seasons as a local show in Boston, producer Norman Lear offered to produce the program in Hollywood and put it into nationwide syndication for the 1979–80 season. For the Lear incarnation of the series, the show was re-cast with nationally known actors including Larry Keith, Anita Gillette and popular teen actor of the time, Chris Petersen (credited by several online sources, including IMDb, as "Chris Peterson", but this is a misspelling).

The show was slated to end production after its Lear-produced season due to poor ratings performance. However, the show was then acquired by a Canadian firm, Wilks and Close Productions, who moved the production to Toronto and recast it with Canadian actors — including Sean McCann, Terry Tweed and child actors Sammy Snyders and Megan Follows — playing a different version of the Baxter family. Lear withdrew from the production at this time. In Canada, the show's broadcast and syndication was handled by CHCH-TV, an independent station in Hamilton, Ontario which was emerging as one of Canada's leading distributors of syndicated programming, while American distribution rights reverted to its original creators in Boston. The retooled version, however, also lasted only a single season before ending production in 1981.

In an interview, Rue McClanahan said she did the pilot episode of this series for Norman Lear but told him she didn't want to do the series itself. This pilot is available to watch at The Paley Center for Media. A script binder entitled The Baxters was discovered many years later to be a part of her personal collection.
