= List of Chico and the Man episodes =

This is a list of episodes for the television series Chico and the Man, which ran from 1974 to 1978 (despite the death of actor Freddie Prinze, who played Chico, in January 1977).

== Series overview ==
Season	Episodes	First aired	Last aired
1	22	September 13, 1974	March 14, 1975
2	22	September 12, 1975	March 3, 1976
3	21	October 1, 1976	April 8, 1977
4	23 (1 unaired)	September 16, 1977	July 21, 1978

== Episodes ==
=== Season 1 (1974–75) ===
No. overall	No. in season	Title	Directed by	Written by	Original release date
1	1	"Pilot" "The Man Meets Chico"	Peter Baldwin	James Komack, Don Nicholl, Michael Ross & Bernard West	September 13, 1974
Chico Rodriguez successfully persuades cranky, bigoted garage owner Ed Brown to take him on as an employee and partner in the business, and to let him live in the garage in Ed's old van.
2	2	"Second Thoughts"	Peter Baldwin	Adele Styler & Burt Styler	September 20, 1974
Ed has second thoughts about hiring Chico and tries as best he can to get rid of him.
3	3	"Old Dog"	Peter Baldwin	James Komack	September 27, 1974
Ed struggles to repair a foreign car, and thinks that he's lost his mechanic skills.
4	4	"New Suit"	Peter Baldwin	James Komack	October 4, 1974
Ed, feeling like he hasn't made any progression in life, does not want to attend his former Army reunion.
5	5	"Borrowed Trouble"	Peter Baldwin	Norman Barasch & Carroll Moore	October 11, 1974
Chico tries to persuade Ed to take a loan from the bank to improve the conditions of customer service.
6	6	"E Pluribus Used Car"	Peter Baldwin	Norm Liebmann & Larry Markes	October 25, 1974
Louis gives Ed and Chico his used car to sell, which gives Chico the idea of selling used cars as a part of Ed's business.
7	7	"Lifestyle"	Peter Baldwin	Ron Friedman	November 1, 1974
Ed thinks that something kinky was going on between Chico and his girlfriend when he caught them in the back seat of Chico's van... but was Ed just jumping to conclusions?
8	8	"The Veterans"	Peter Baldwin	Robert Hilliard, Michael Morris & Bud Wiser	November 8, 1974
Chico and Ed try getting Veterans financing from the Government.
9	9	"No Room in the Garage"	Peter Baldwin	Bill Dana	November 15, 1974
A pregnant Spanish woman comes in the garage, and Ed thinks that Chico may be the father of the unborn child.
10	10	"The Letter"	Peter Baldwin	James Komack	December 6, 1974
Chico wants to participate in his cousin's business in New York.
11	11	"Natural Causes"	Peter Baldwin	Steve Gordon	December 20, 1974
When Ed hears about a death of a friend, he begins to think that he may be the next one to meet his maker.
12	12	"The Manuel Who Came to Dinner"	Peter Baldwin	Elias Davis & David Pollock	December 27, 1974
A car is towed into Ed's garage and it turns out that the man was a Chicano friend of Ed's from the past.
13	13	"Garage Sale"	Peter Baldwin	Ed Jurist	January 3, 1975
Ed's garage is inspected, and when the inspector finds a pile of junk in front of an emergency exit, he issues an ultimatum: either get rid of the junk, or get a hefty fine. Ed then decides to profit from the ultimatum by having a garage sale.
14	14	"Out of Sight"	Peter Baldwin	Ron Friedman	January 17, 1975
Ed is determined to go to court to testify on a car accident that he may have witnessed despite his eye problem.
15	15	"The Beard"	Peter Baldwin	Robert Hilliard & Michael Morris	January 24, 1975
Harold, a cheating husband, counts on Ed to cover for him on his wild nights out.
16	16	"If I Were a Rich Man"	Bill Foster	Jerry Ross	January 31, 1975
Ed tries to snap Chico out of spending too much on a woman he has fallen in love with.
17	17	"Ed Steps Out"	Peter Baldwin	Jerry Ross	February 7, 1975
A widowed baker buys a bakery in the area and has her dibs on Ed.
18	18	"Sammy Stops In"	James Komack	Martin Donovan, Robert Hilliard & Michael Morris	February 14, 1975
When his car acts up, Sammy Davis, Jr. pulls into the garage to get it fixed, and fans are soon crawling out of the woodwork.
19	19	"The Doctor Story"	Jack Donohue	Ed Jurist	February 21, 1975
Ed would rather fix his aching shoulder himself than go to see a doctor.
20	20	"The Giveaway"	Jack Donohue	Eric Cohen & Robert Hilliard	February 28, 1975
Chico is carrying large amounts of cash and working strange hours.
21	21	"Louie's Retirement"	James Komack	Art Baer & Ben Joelson	March 7, 1975
Louie, who has retired, wants to spend his remaining years hanging around the garage.
22	22	"Long Live the Man"	Jack Donohue	Michael Morris	March 14, 1975
Everyone thinks that Ed died, and when Ed finds out about it, he gets upset because nobody had cried for him when they heard the misleading news.

=== Season 2 (1975–76) ===
No. overall	No. in season	Title	Directed by	Written by	Original release date
23	1	"The Paint Job"	Jack Donohue	Ron Friedman	September 12, 1975
Ed and Chico clash over the wall of their alley for an art competition.
24	2	"This Hallowed Garage"	Jack Donohue	Ron Friedman	September 19, 1975
The city plans to demolish Ed's garage to open a newer, more enhanced power gas station.
25	3	"Aunt Connie"	Jack Donohue	Howard Albrecht & Sol Weinstein	September 26, 1975
Ed develops the hots for Chico's visiting Aunt Connie (Angelina Estrada).
26	4	"Play Gypsy"	Jack Donohue	Ron Friedman	October 3, 1975
A Gypsy named Miklos (Avery Schreiber) wants Ed to train him to be a good mechanic. Miklos appears again in "The Misfortune Teller."
27	5	"The Disappearance"	Jack Donohue	Michael Morris	October 10, 1975
Chico sees Ed sneaking out of the garage and going to a bar where he and his late wife used to spend their anniversary. Chico worries that Ed is spending too much time dwelling on the past and not getting on with his life, and he and Louie set out to bring Ed back to the present.
28	6	"Chico and the Van"	Jack Donohue	Ann Gibbs & Joel Kimmel	October 17, 1975
A city "Truant Officer" tells Chico that his van is illegal in the states, so Chico moves upstairs with Ed, but the closeness may actually drive them apart.
29	7	"Ms. Liz"	Jack Donohue	Jack Mendelsohn & Lynn Roth	October 31, 1975
Chico falls head over heels for a woman named Liz. In fact, he likes her so much that he decides to marry her.
30	8	"Mister Butterfly"	Jack Donohue	Ron Friedman	November 7, 1975
A Japanese man visits the garage claiming to be Ed's long-lost son.
31	9	"The Misfortune Teller"	Jack Donohue	Sandy Krinski	November 14, 1975
Ed tries to prevent the bank from foreclosing the mortgage on his garage by visiting a fortune teller, namely Miklos (from "Play Gypsy").
32	10	"Bird in a Gilded Cage"	Jack Donohue	Bernie Kahn	November 21, 1975
A former silent movie actress whom Ed idolized pulls her car into the garage for repairs. Ed still idolizes her and cannot accept her current position as a waitress in a local cafe.
33	11	"The Strike"	Jack Donohue	Milt Rosen	November 28, 1975
Chico joins a union for mechanics, but is forced to picket Ed's Garage.
34	12	"The Invention"	Jack Donohue	Mike Milligan & Jay Moriarty	December 5, 1975
Ed creates a new invention: training wheels for motorcycles. While trying to get the idea patented, they get swindled out of $500 for the patent process.
35	13	"The Juror"	Jack Donohue	Sandy Krinski	December 19, 1975
Chico is assigned jury duty, and he finds out that the defendant on trial is actually a good friend of Ed's.
36	14	"The Dream"	Jack Donohue	Ron Friedman	January 9, 1976
Chico tries to persuade Ed to retire and move into a retirement home, but naturally Ed will not go for it.
37	15	"The Hypnotist"	Jack Donohue	Barbara Tibbles & Doug Tibbles	January 16, 1976
Because Louie is too afraid to go to the dentist, he asks Chico to hypnotize him. Ed, who doesn't believe in it, is the one who gets hypnotized. Chico then implants a post-hypnotic suggestion wherein Ed will do whatever he's asked if he hears the words "Will you." But when Flora asks him to marry her, he does.
38	16	"Reverend Bemis's Altar Ego"	Jack Donohue	John L. Greene & Arthur Phillips	January 23, 1976
After Chico guest preaches a good sermon at Reverend Bemis' church, the congregation decides that they would rather have Chico preach instead of the Reverend.
39	17	"The Big Brush-Off"	Jack Donohue	Larry Siegel	January 28, 1976
Chico is having woman problems: a girl that he likes will not go out with him because he looks too much like her ex-fiancé.
40	18	"The Accident"	Jack Donohue	Ron Friedman	February 4, 1976
After Chico gets into an accident, Ed borrows from his own insurance money to send Chico to school.
41	19	"Chico's Cousin Pepe"	Jack Donohue	Fred S. Fox & Seaman Jacobs	February 11, 1976
Pepe Fernando (José Feliciano), Chico's blind cousin, is a famous Latino singer. Pepe shows up in a limo and his driver has to quit the same day. He offers the job to Chico but Ed, while Chico is out, unwittingly talks Pepe into considering Chico's girlfriend! She doesn't know, however, that Pepe is "all hands" when it comes to women. Feliciano briefly sings his classic version of "Light My Fire" and actually sings the show's theme song to Ed and Chico when they start arguing.
42	20	"The Return of Aunt Connie"	Jack Donohue	Iris Rainer & Mort Scharfman	February 18, 1976
Chico's Aunt Connie (from the episode "Aunt Connie") visits and when she does, Chico and Ed realize that she is a con artist.
43	21	"Too Many Crooks"	Jack Donohue	John L. Greene & Arthur Phillips	February 25, 1976
Ed, not knowing that he gave a handout to a crook, eventually has all kinds of crooks from the neighborhood coming to him for a handout as well.
44	22	"The Face Job"	Jack Donohue	Howard Albrecht & Sol Weinstein	March 3, 1976
Ed's public life is almost destroyed when he is offered a free face lift.

=== Season 3 (1976–77) ===
No. overall	No. in season	Title	Directed by	Written by	Original release date
45	1	"Della Moves In"	Jack Donohue	Hal Kanter & Michael Morris	October 1, 1976
Ed gets a new neighbor, but to his dismay it's a loud-mouthed liberal woman named Della Rogers (Della Reese) who now owns his garage and threatens eviction.
46	2	"Second Coming of Della"	Jack Donohue	Hal Kanter & Michael Morris	October 8, 1976
When Ed lays off the fighting with his new landlady, Della decides to renew Ed's lease.
47	3	"Chico Packs His Bags"	Jack Donohue	Marty Nadler & Freddie Prinze	October 22, 1976
Chico decides that he would rather move out on his own, away from Ed, than give in to Ed's rules.
48	4	"Chico's Problem"	Jack Donohue	Howard Albrecht & Sol Weinstein	November 5, 1976
Chico's girlfriend decides to quit being a nurse, so she can spend more time with Chico. She then changes her mind after saving Ed's life.
49	5	"In Your Hat"	Jack Donohue	Hal Kanter	November 12, 1976
Ed's lucky hat is stolen, and while he needs to have an operation, he won't go under the knife until he gets his hat back.
50	6	"Ed's Recuperation"	Jack Donohue	Hal Kanter & Michael Morris	November 19, 1976
After finding out that the nurse that Ed hired wants to marry him, Chico and Della try to talk her out of it.
51	7	"Ed Brown vs. the IRS"	Jack Donohue	Patricia Jones & Donald Reiker	November 26, 1976
After Ed refuses to pay his taxes, Chico and Louie decide that the only way to get them in is to forge Ed's name to the document.
52	8	"Morgan and the Man"	Jack Donohue	Carol Gary & Doris Prouder	December 3, 1976
Chico is reunited with his old high school girlfriend. Thinking the magic is still there, he proposes to her, but she ends up not wanting to marry him.
53	9	"Mucho Macho Ed"	Jack Donohue	Si Rose	December 10, 1976
A woman visits the garage claiming that Ed is the father to her unborn kid. When he hears of this, he wonders how. He then decides to ask for her hand in marriage.
54	10	"Old Is Gold"	Jack Donohue	Jack Mendelsohn	December 17, 1976
Ed gets the idea of hiring a senior citizen for the garage when Della persuades him through a debate that seniors don't have the same rights that younger people have.
55	11	"Ready When You Are, CB"	Jack Donohue	Si Rose	December 24, 1976
Everyone has places to go and people to see on New Year's Eve except Ed. Talking on the CB radio, he connects with a woman on the road who also has no New Year's Eve plans, and he invites her to the garage.
56	12	"The Dress"	Jack Donohue	Ben Starr & Charles Stewart	January 7, 1977
Ed donates his deceased wife's dress to raise money for a charity auction. He later regrets doing this when a cross-dressing man is interested in buying it.
57	13	"A Minority of One"	Jack Donohue	Robert O'Brien	January 14, 1977
Ed is elected President of a Mexican Better Business bureau.
58	14	"Champs Ain't Chumps"	Jack Donohue	Ben Starr & Charles Stewart	January 28, 1977
Ed worries about Chico when Chico decides he wants to fight as a professional.
59	15	"Chico's Padre"	Jack Donohue	George Arthur Bloom, Ron Friedman & Henry Irving	February 4, 1977
Chico is incredulous when his wealthy father, Gilberto (Cesar Romero), whom he hasn't seen in years, returns to try to give Chico a chance to better his life by living with him. Note: This was the first episode to air after Prinze's death; during the opening credits of the original broadcast, series creator and producer James Komack's voice thanked everyone for their sympathy. During the closing credits, Jack Albertson did the same.
60	16	"Matchmaker, Matchmaker"	Jack Donohue	Si Rose	February 18, 1977
Della plays matchmaker at trying to set Ed up with a woman. However, when Ed gets word that Della did the matchmaking, he immediately wants to call the whole thing off.
61	17	"Black Tie Blues"	Jack Donohue	John Fenton Murray	February 25, 1977
Della wants to attend a formal dance and needs a host to go with her. Nobody wants to go, so they all try to find ways to get out of it.
62	18	"Ed Talks to God"	Jack Donohue	Michael Morris	March 4, 1977
Ed does not feel like appearing at his own birthday party. Chico, however, tries to find a way for Ed to go; he gets a hold of a good old friend of Ed's and has him impersonate the voice of God via sound equipment and a microphone. Note: This episode marks the final appearance of Freddie Prinze.
63	19	"Gregory Peck Is a Rooster"	Jack Donohue	George Arthur Bloom & Beverly Bloomberg	March 18, 1977
Ed sells a rooster that belongs to him, but when he finds out that the rooster's purpose is to cockfight, he tries to get the bird back.
64	20	"Louie's Can-Can"	Jack Donohue	George Arthur Bloom & Beverly Bloomberg	April 1, 1977
Louie hires Ed to be a garbage truck driver, after he is forced to retire his job and decides to open his own garbage collecting business.
65	21	"Uncle Sonny"	Jack Donohue	Henry Irving	April 8, 1977
While Ed is away, his daring uncle comes to visit and throws an all-night girl party.

=== Season 4 (1977–78) ===
No. overall	No. in season	Title	Directed by	Written by	Original release date
66	1	"Who's Been Sleeping in My Car?"	Jack Donohue	George Arthur Bloom & Beverly Bloomberg	September 16, 1977
Ed, who returns from Mexico, learns that he has an eleven-year-old stowaway in the back of his car who's determined to stay with Ed in the United States.
67	2	"Su Casa, Mi Casa?"	Jack Donohue	Gary Belkin & Jerry Ross	September 23, 1977
Ed waits for word from Raul's parents, only to find out that Raul is an orphan and needs a parent.
68	3	"Take Me, I'm Yours"	Jack Donohue	Ben Starr & Charles Stewart	September 30, 1977
When a social worker comes to take Raul away, Ed decides to adopt him as his own.
69	4	"The Third Letter"	Jack Donohue	Ben Starr & Charles Stewart	October 14, 1977
Ed needs a third reference letter to officially adopt Raul.
70	5	"The Bed"	Jack Donohue	Gary Belkin	October 21, 1977
Raul tries to do a favor for Ed by trading in his old mattress towards a new one, unaware that Ed had stuffed $700 in the old one.
71	6	"A Matter of Privacy"	Jack Donohue	Chet Dowling & Sandy Krinski	November 4, 1977
Ed tries to teach Raul how important it is to respect one's privacy, but forgets his own lesson when he opens a package meant for Raul.
72	7	"The Proposal"	Jack Donohue	Bob Shayne	November 11, 1977
Ed and Della decide to have Christmas dinner together. As they are eating and drinking wine, they both get drunk and before you know it, Ed proposes marriage to Della.
73	8	"Aunt Charo"	Jack Donohue	Bill Daley, Gene Farmer, Peter Gallay & Norm Liebmann	November 18, 1977
Raul's Aunt Charo (played by Charo) comes to the garage to take Raul back to Spain, but he would rather stay with Ed.
74	9	"Charo Takes Over"	Jack Donohue	Bill Daley, Gene Farmer, Peter Gallay & Norm Liebmann	December 2, 1977
Charo tries to drum up Ed's business by taking matters into her own hands.
75	10	"Ed the Hero"	Jack Donohue	Carmen Finestra	December 9, 1977
In a class report, Raul writes about Ed, saying that Ed fixes poor people's cars for free. When word gets out, poor folks from all over the neighborhood swamp Ed trying to get their cars fixed.
76	11	"Ed's Team"	Jack Donohue	Adele Styler & Burt Styler	December 30, 1977
Ed sponsors a basketball team that Raul wants to join.
77	12	"The Americanization of Charo"	Jack Donohue	Bill Daley, Gene Farmer & Norm Liebmann	January 6, 1978
Aunt Charo takes her citizenship test and becomes an American citizen.
78–79	13–14	"Raul Runs Away"	Jack Donohue	Bill Daley, Gene Farmer, Peter Gallay, Norm Liebmann & Michael Morris	January 20, 1978
Raul discovers Chico's belongings, which had been stored in the van where he lived. Ed finds out when he overhears a guitar playing. In anger, Ed — still having trouble coming to terms with Chico's death months earlier — shoos Raul from the van and smashes the guitar in anger. Raul takes this as a cue that Ed hates him and he runs away. Ed, deeply regretting his words that led Raul to run away, forms a search party to search for the young lad. Everyone later suspects Raul may have returned to Tijuana, Mexico, to search for his family. Acting on the tip, Ed eventually finds Raul in an old church, leading to a reunion. Ed apologizes and explains that Chico had died (though not how), and Raul agrees to go home.
80	15	"Charo and the Matador"	Jack Donohue	Bill Daley & Norm Liebmann	January 27, 1978
Charo's matador fiancé, Antonio, comes to sweep her off her feet to get married.
81	16	"A New Girl in Town"	Jack Donohue	Michael Morris & Don Segall	June 2, 1978
Ed Brown's garage has a new tenant in teenage runaway Monica, who comes to Hollywood to seek fame and fortune.
82	17	"Ed Brown's Car Wash"	Jack Donohue	Bill Daley & Norm Liebmann	June 9, 1978
Monica decides to drum up business by having an all-girl car wash, with the girls in tight shirts and shorts.
83	18	"Buenas Dias, Mr. President"	Jack Donohue	Bill Larkin & Tom Sawyer	June 16, 1978
Ed becomes worried when the President is supposedly going to visit the garage and Secret Service agents are going to do security checks.
84	19	"Della and Son"	Jack Donohue	Gary Belkin & Jerry Ross	June 30, 1978
Della tries to convince her son, Tony, to help with her catering business.
85	20	"Help Wanted"	Jack Donohue	Terry Hart	July 7, 1978
Monica upsets Ed by getting a job at a sleazy restaurant.
86	21	"The Peeping Tom"	Jack Donohue	Sam Locke & Al Schwartz	July 14, 1978
Ed is falsely accused by a woman who swears that he is a peeping Tom and is watching her on a daily basis.
87	22	"The Hot Rock"	Jack Donohue	Ron Friedman	July 21, 1978
Louie comes up with an idea for an invention: a barbecue that relies on solar energy. Enthusiastic about the idea, Ed runs to his insurance company and tries to get money to launch the project.
88	23	"Waiting for Chongo"	Jack Donohue	Jim Belcher	Unaired
Monica's hitchhiking brings a group of bikers to the garage with their leader Chongo.
