= History of comedy =

History of comedy may refer to:

- The history of comedy
- The History of Comedy, a CNN television program
