= The Million Dollar Rip-Off =

- Genre: Crime drama
- Based on: A screenplay by William Devane and John Pleshette
- Written by: Andrew Peter Marin
- Directed by: Alexander Singer
- Starring: Freddie Prinze
- Music by: Vic Mizzy
- Country of origin: United States
- Original language: English

Production
- Executive producer: Charles Fries
- Producer: Edward J. Montagne
- Production locations: Skokie, Illinois; Chicago; Los Angeles
- Cinematography: Jules Brenner
- Editor: Sam E. Waxman
- Running time: 73 minutes
- Production company: Charles Fries Productions

Original release
- Network: NBC
- Release: September 22, 1976

The Million Dollar Rip-Off is a 1976 American made-for-television crime comedy film starring Freddie Prinze in his television film debut and his only film role of any kind. Directed by Alexander Singer and written by Andrew Peter Marin based on a screenplay by William Devane and John Pleshette, the film premiered on NBC on September 22, 1976.

== Plot ==
An ex-con electronics genius (Prinze) and his four female accomplices devise a plot to steal millions of dollars from the Chicago Transit Authority. A detective, who has been keeping tabs on him since he got out of prison, suspects that he is up to something and tries to catch him at it.

== Cast ==
- Freddie Prinze as Muff Kovak
- Allen Garfield as Lieutenant Ralph Fogherty
- Christine Belford as Lil
- Linda Scruggs as Helene (as Linda Scruggs Bogart)
- Joanna Kerns as Jessie (as Joanna DeVarona)
- Brooke Mills as Kitty
- James Sloyan as Lubeck
- Bob Hastings as Sergeant Frank Jarrett
- Gary Vinson as Hennessy
