= Freddie Prinze =

American actor and comedian (1954–1977)

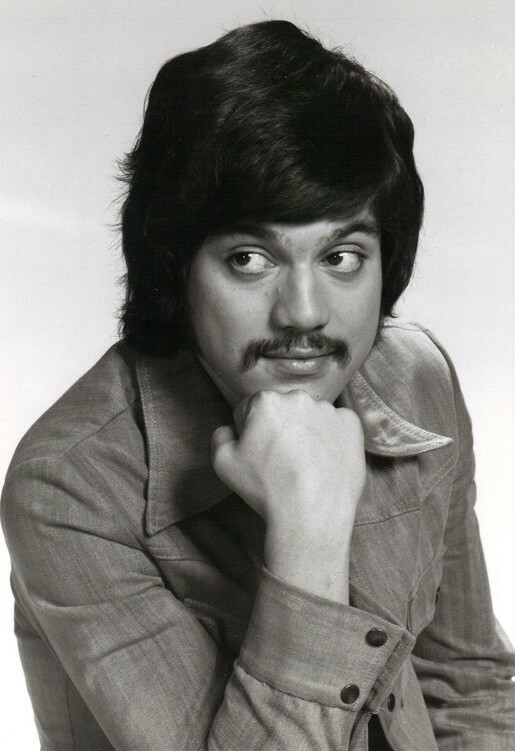
- Prinze in 1975
- Born: Frederick Karl Pruetzel; June 22, 1954; New York City, New York, U.S.
- Died: January 29, 1977 (aged 22); Los Angeles, California, U.S.
- Spouse: Katherine Cochran (m. 1975; sep. 1976)
- Children: Freddie Jr.

Comedy career
- Years active: 1973–1977
- Medium: Stand-up, television
- Genres: Observational comedy, blue comedy, deadpan, satire
- Subjects: Latin American culture, recreational drug use, everyday life

Frederick James Prinze (born Frederick Karl Pruetzel; June 22, 1954 – January 29, 1977) was an American stand-up comedian and actor, and the star of the NBC-TV sitcom Chico and the Man from 1974 until his death in 1977. He was described in a Vulture magazine article as "having blown up like no other comedian in history." Prinze is the father of actor Freddie Prinze Jr.

== Early life ==
Prinze was born Frederick Karl Pruetzel (German spelling: Prützel) at Saint Clare's Hospital in the Hell's Kitchen neighborhood of Manhattan, New York City, the son of Maria de Gracia Pruetzel (née Graniela y Ramirez) and Edward Karl Pruetzel. His mother was a Puerto Rican Catholic and his father was a German Lutheran immigrant who had arrived in the U.S. as a youth in 1934. Prinze was raised in a mixed neighborhood in Washington Heights, New York City. When Prinze was a small child, his mother enrolled him in ballet classes to deal with a weight problem. Without telling his parents, Prinze successfully auditioned for the High School of Performing Arts, where he was introduced to drama and continued ballet—and where he discovered his gift for comedy while entertaining crowds in the boys' restroom. He dropped out of school in his senior year to become a stand-up comedian.

== Career ==
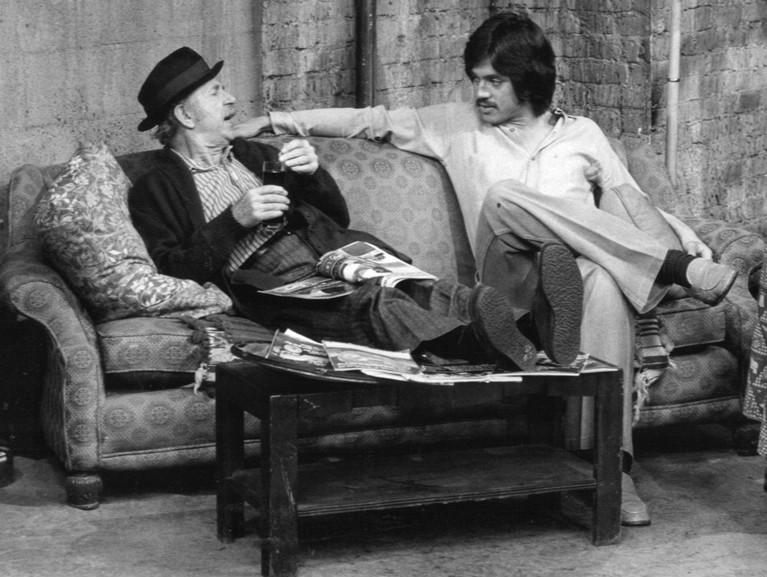
Prinze (right) with Jack Albertson on Chico and the Man, 1976

Prinze worked at several comedy clubs in New York City, including The Improv and Catch a Rising Star, where he introduced himself to audiences as a "Hunga-rican" (part Hungarian, part Puerto Rican). Although his mother was in fact Puerto Rican, his father was a German immigrant with Hungarian ancestry. Prinze's son, Freddie Prinze Jr., has stated many times that his father was half German/half Puerto Rican. This is also verified by census records as well as Prützel/Pruetzel family accounts. For the sake of his budding comedic career, he legally changed his surname to "Prinze". According to his friend David Brenner, Prinze originally wanted to be known as the king of comedy, but since Alan King already had that last name and sobriquet, he would be the prince of comedy instead. During 1973, Prinze made his first television appearance on one of the last episodes of Jack Paar Tonite. In December 1973, his biggest break came with an appearance on The Tonight Show Starring Johnny Carson. Prinze was the first young comedian to be asked to have a sit-down chat with Carson on his first appearance. Prinze appeared on and guest-hosted The Tonight Show on several other occasions. He also appeared on The Midnight Special to perform his comic routine.

From September 1974 until his death in January 1977, Prinze starred as Francisco "Chico" Rodriguez in the NBC TV series Chico and the Man with Jack Albertson. The show was an instant hit. Prinze made several appearances on The Dean Martin Celebrity Roasts, most notably the roasts for Sammy Davis Jr. and Muhammad Ali. In 1975, he released a comedy album that was taped live at Mister Kelly's in Chicago entitled Looking Good—his catch phrase from Chico and the Man. In 1976, he starred in a made-for-TV movie, The Million Dollar Rip-Off. Prinze had a little-known talent for singing, examples of which could be heard in the background of the title song of the Tony Orlando and Dawn album To Be With You, in his appearances on their variety show, and on rare occasions on his own sitcom. About four months before his death, Prinze signed a five-year deal with NBC worth $6 million.

== Personal life ==
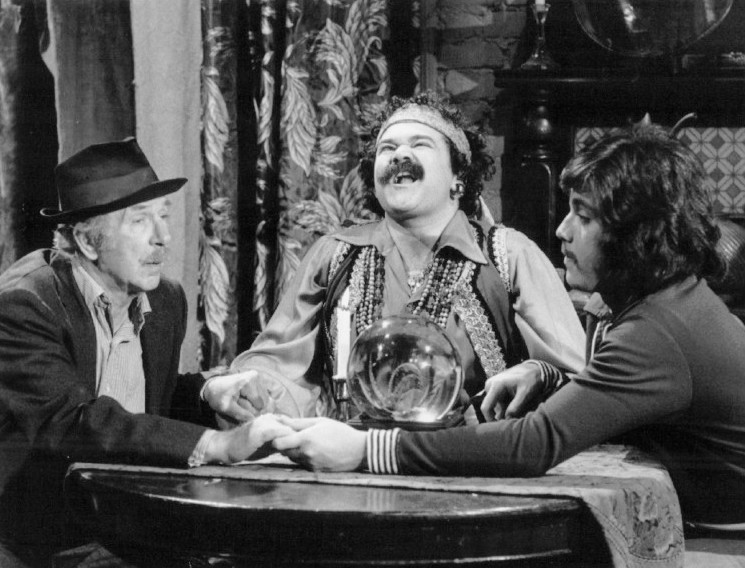
Jack Albertson, Avery Schreiber, and Prinze on Chico and the Man (1975)

On October 13, 1975, Prinze married Katherine "Kathy" Elaine (Barber) Cochran, with whom he had one child, son Freddie Prinze Jr., who was born March 8, 1976. Prinze was arrested for driving under the influence of Quaalude on November 16, 1976. A few weeks later his wife filed for divorce.

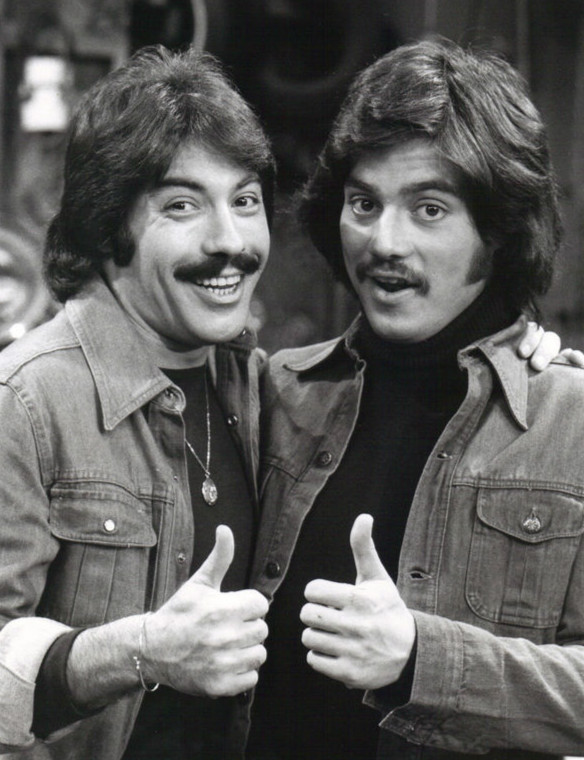
Prinze (right) with Tony Orlando on Chico and the Man (1976)

Prinze had been romantically linked to actresses Raquel Welch and Pam Grier, whom he met in 1973. Grier recalls their relationship in chapter nineteen of her memoir, My Life in Three Acts. After his break-up with Grier, Prinze dated actress Lonette McKee for a time during 1976. Prinze also dated Joanna Kerns a short time before he died. The two had worked together on the 1976 TV movie The Million Dollar Rip-Off. Author Frank Hardy has written that his sister Mary, a popular television comedian in Australia who would later commit suicide too, had an ongoing affair with Prinze, typically spending six weeks of each year with him in the years before his death.

Prinze was very close friends with singer Tony Orlando; Orlando appeared on Chico and the Man, and Prinze appeared on Orlando's variety show. As he started to make more money, Prinze took martial arts lessons from Robert Wall, a student of Bruce Lee, who appeared in Enter the Dragon and The Way of the Dragon. Soon after, Wall became godfather to Prinze's newborn son, who himself is also a martial artist (Gracie family Brazilian jiu-jitsu).

== Death ==
Prinze suffered from depression. On the night of January 28, 1977, after talking on the telephone with his estranged wife, Prinze received a visit from his business manager, Marvin "Dusty" Snyder. During the visit, Prinze quickly put a gun to his head and shot himself. He had purchased this gun in the presence of fellow actors Jimmie "JJ" Walker and Alan Bursky, although it was long rumored that Bursky gave him the gun. Prinze was rushed to the UCLA Medical Center and placed on life support following emergency surgery. His family removed him from life support, and he died at 1 p.m. the following day.

Tony Orlando and Jack Albertson were among those who gave eulogies at Prinze's Funeral at the Old North Church located within Forest Lawn Memorial Park in the Hollywood Hills near Los Angeles.

Prinze made farewell phone calls to numerous family members and friends prior to shooting himself and left a note stating that he had decided to kill himself. In 1977, the death was ruled a suicide. However, in a 1983 civil case brought by his mother, wife, and son against Crown Life Insurance Company, the jury found that his death was medication-induced and accidental, claiming that he was intoxicated and had intended to pretend to shoot himself but failed to notice the safety was off. The family was able to collect $200,000 in life insurance. This followed a $1,000,000 out of court settlement with his psychiatrist and doctor to end a malpractice suit for allowing him access to a gun and overprescribing him Quaalude (as a tranquilizer).

Prinze is interred at Forest Lawn Memorial Park in the Hollywood Hills near his father, Edward Karl Pruetzel. His son, Freddie Prinze Jr., who was ten months old when his father died, did not speak publicly about his father's death until he discussed it in the documentary Misery Loves Comedy (2015), directed by Kevin Pollak.

== Filmography ==
Year	Title	Role	Notes
1973–1974	The Merv Griffin Show	Himself (Guest)	3 episodes
1973–1976	The Tonight Show with Johnny Carson	Himself (Guest)	20 episodes Guest (17 episodes); Guest Host (3 episodes)
1974	The Midnight Special	Himself	TV Special
1974	The Dean Martin Comedy World	Himself (Guest)	2 episodes
1974	The Flip Wilson Special	Himself (Guest)	TV Special
1974–1975	The $25,000 Pyramid	Himself (Celebrity Contestant)	2 episodes
1974–1975	The Mike Douglas Show	Himself (Guest)	9 episodes
1974–1976	The Hollywood Squares	Himself (Panelist)	5 episodes
1974–1977	Chico and the Man	Chico Rodriguez	series regular (62 episodes); Writer (1 episode) — #3.3 "Chico Packs His Bags" (written by) (1976); Nominated – Golden Globe Award for Best Actor in a Television Series — Comedy or Musical (1977)
1975	The Smothers Brothers Show	Himself (Guest)	"Episode #1.2"
1975	The Midnight Special	Himself (Guest)	Episode #133
1975	The 1975 Annual Entertainment Hall of Fame Awards	Himself	TV Special
1975	Cher	Himself (Guest)	"Episode #1.5"
1975–1976	Dean Martin Celebrity Roast	Himself (Guest)	TV Special (2 episodes) — "Sammy Davis, Jr." (1975) — "Muhammad Ali" (1976)
1975–1976	Dinah!	Himself (Guest)	6 episodes
1975–1976	Tony Orlando and Dawn	Himself (Guest)	2 episodes
1975	American Bandstand	Himself (Guest)	"Episode #19.2"
1976	On Location: Freddie Prinze and Friends	Himself (Host)	TV Special (Also Writer)
1976	The Million Dollar Rip-Off	Muff Kovak	TV Movie
1976	Sammy and Company	Himself (Guest)	2 episodes
1976	The Rich Little Show	Himself (Guest)	"Betty White and C.W. McCall"
1976	Joys!	Himself (Host)	TV Special
1976	From Montreal, the Bob Hope Olympic Benefit	Himself (Guest)	TV Special
1976	The Kelly Monteith Show	Himself (Guest)	"06.16.1976"
1976	The Great NBC Smilin' Saturday Mornin' Parade	Himself (Host)	TV Movie
1976	NBC: The First Fifty Years	Himself	TV Movie
1976	Van Dyke and Company	Himself	"Episode #1.7"
Archive Footage
Year	Title	Role	Notes
1978	Chico and the Man	Chico Rodriguez	Uncredited "Raul Runs Away: Part 1"
1988	Hollywood Scandals and Tragedies	Himself	Direct-to-Video
1992	The Tonight Show Starring Johnny Carson	Himself	"The Last Tonight Show"
1996	Classic Stand-Up Comedy of Television	Himself	TV Special
1998	Behind the Music	Himself	"Tony Orlando"
1998	E! True Hollywood Story	Himself	Episode #2.28 "Freddie Prinze"
2003	101 Most Shocking Moments in Entertainment	Himself	TV Movie
2004	100 Greatest Stand-Ups of All Time	Himself (#49)	Miniseries
2007	Mr. Warmth: The Don Rickles Project	Himself	TV Movie
2009	The Tragic Side of Comedy	Himself	TV Movie
2016	Entertainment Tonight	Himself	"06.11.2016"
2016	Extra	Himself	"06.11.2016"
2017	The History of Comedy	Himself	"One Nation, Under Comedy"
2020	Wait in the Wings	Himself	"Fame (1980): A Musical Revolution?"
2020	The Comedy Store	Himself	Miniseries (3 episodes) — #1.1 "Saw You Last Night on The Tonight Show" — #1.2 "The Comedy Strike" — #1.5 "The Birth of a Bit"
2021	History of the Sitcom	Himself	"Facing Race"
2022	Autopsy: The Last Hours of	Himself	"Freddie Prinze"
2022	Dark Side of Comedy	Himself	"Freddie Prinze"
2023	Dick Van Dyke 98 Years of Magic	Himself	TV Special

== Legacy ==
Prinze's mother wrote a book about her son, The Freddie Prinze Story (1978).

Can You Hear the Laughter? The Story of Freddie Prinze (September 1979) is a TV biopic detailing Prinze's life. Prinze's life and death were a focal point of one of the storylines in the movie Fame (1980), set in Prinze's alma mater, the LaGuardia High School of Performing Arts.

Prinze received a star on the Hollywood Walk of Fame on December 14, 2004, honoring his contribution to the television industry. Actor and comedian George Lopez has acknowledged that he paid for Prinze's star.
