= History of the Sitcom =

- Genre: Television documentary
- Country of origin: United States
- Original language: English
- No. of seasons: 1

Production
- Executive producers: John Ealer; Bill Carter
- Running time: 42 minutes

Original release
- Network: CNN
- Release: July 11 – August 22, 2021

Related
- The History of Comedy; The Movies (miniseries); The Story of Late Night; See It Loud: The History Of Black Television

History of the Sitcom is an eight-part CNN documentary television series that traces the development of the American situation comedy show from the 1950s to the 21st century era. The show features 184 interviews with creatives, actors and directors including Norman Lear, Mel Brooks, Yvette Lee Bowser, Marta Kauffman, and Carl Reiner (in his last recorded interview after death). The series follows a similar format of the CNN Original Series The History of Comedy.

The series takes an expansive view of what can be considered a sitcom; it includes traditional programs shot with multiple cameras in front of a live audience such as I Love Lucy as well as modern single camera programs like Fleabag. The decision about which programs to include, according to series producer Bill Carter, came down to: "If the overarching purpose of the show is to make you laugh, it can be considered a sitcom. And in almost all cases, the shows are half-hours rather than hours."

== Series overview ==
Season	Episodes	Originally released	
Season	Episodes	First released	Last released
1	8	July 11, 2021	August 22, 2021

== Production ==
"The series uses the same team — executive producer John Ealer and former New York Times media writer Bill Carter — that recently created CNN's six-part The Story of Late Night.

They first had to first decide how to define a sitcom, which originally was three cameras on a soundstage before a live studio audience and a laugh track. But in recent years, comedies such as The Office and Modern Family dispensed with the laugh track and audience. "We created a sniff test," Ealer said. "Does it feel like a sitcom? Insecure is not the same as The Mary Tyler Moore Show. Yet they both represent how comedy opened up the viewpoints of Americans in profoundly funny ways." Carter noted that M*A*S*H was considered a groundbreaking comedy despite heavy doses of drama. "If you started to eliminate shows because they had a lot of drama, you'd get rid of a lot of great comedy," he said.

History of the Sitcom began production just before the pandemic and used the rest of the year to interview a whopping 184 people for the series, including some of the biggest living luminaries of the sitcom world, from Ted Danson to SNL's Tina Fey. Ealer said they strategically began lining up interviews of the older luminaries first and fortunately did so right before the pandemic."

Before each episode, there is a 10-second intro to the show that mimics the title cards of famous sitcoms including I Love Lucy, Bewitched, The Mary Tyler Moore Show, Home Improvement, Happy Days, Living Single, M*A*S*H, Seinfeld, Gilligan's Island, Fresh Off the Boat, Cheers, Frasier, Black-ish. Friends, The Fresh Prince of Bel-Air, The Simpsons (animation), Arrested Development and ends with the show name inside a box TV set. The beat of the intro is similar to Seinfeld's and has a sitcom laugh track at the end.

== Episodes ==
No. overall	No. in season	Title	Original release date
1	1	"A Family Matter"	July 11, 2021
"Moms, dads, husbands, wives, brothers, sisters – more than just a hilarious reflection of the people we grow up and old with, sitcoms have opened our hearts to a more inclusive visions of what 'family' can mean."
2	2	"Sex & The Sitcom"	July 11, 2021
"Since America has long found it easier to laugh about sex than talk seriously about it, sitcom humor has had a critical role ushering in a new era of openness, not just towards sex, but toward women's rights and gender identity."
3	3	"Just Friends"	July 18, 2021
"When Americans look beyond family or work for their identity, the 'hanging out with friends' sitcom hilariously redefines the genre while also revealing television's challenging quest for inclusivity and authentic representation."
4	4	"Working for Laughs"	July 25, 2021
"Work families can be even funnier than our biological ones, since the endless array of wacky sitcom characters on the job offers hilarious insights into the state of the American workplace."
5	5	"Facing Race"	August 1, 2021
"In many homes, difficult conversations about race and diversity have first happened on the sitcom screen, helping pave the way for progress with hilarity and laughter."
6	6	"Movin' On Up"	August 8, 2021
"Upward mobility, the American Dream, pulling yourself up by your bootstraps – sitcom laughs have helped generations of Americans come to grips with their place in a supposed 'classless' society."
7	7	"Freaks, Geeks & Outsiders"	August 15, 2021
"Aliens, geeks, monsters, immigrants, witches… the fresh perspective of sitcom fish-out-of-water give us funny new insights into the ever-changing face of America."
8	8	"Escaping Reality"	August 22, 2021
"Sitcoms have long been the ultimate comedy comfort food, but what sitcoms offer escape from – and what they offer escape to – reveal a lot about the state of the American mind, and the state of sitcom form itself."

== List of sitcoms represented ==
Each episode section below lists the film clips from the decade that are featured in that episode. The list below will order the sitcoms in the chronology order in which they appear in the show and only have shows that are credited on the right/left corner once they are introduced. If a series appears many times in the same episodes, it will be listed on the time it is mainly mentioned.

=== Episode 1: A Family Matter ===
- Arrested Development (2003 - 2019)
- Frasier (1993 - 2004)
- I Love Lucy (1951 - 1957)
- The Adventures of Ozzie and Harriet (1952 - 1966)
- Father Knows Best (1954 - 1960)
- Leave It to Beaver (1957 - 1963)
- Better Things (2016 - 2022)
- My Three Sons (1960 - 1972)
- The Brady Bunch (1969 - 1974)
- The Partridge Family (1970 - 1974)
- And Justice For All (Pilot) (1968)
- Those Were The Days (Pilot) (1969)
- Petticoat Junction (1963 - 1970)
- The Beverly Hillbillies (1962 - 1971)
- Green Acres (1965 - 1971)
- All In The Family (1971 - 1979)
- Maude (1972 - 1978)
- Good Times (1974 - 1979)
- One Day at a Time (1975 - 1984)
- Family Ties (1982 - 1989)
- The Cosby Show (1984 - 1992)
- Growing Pains (1987-1992)
- Married... with Children (1987 - 1997)
- Roseanne (1988 - 1997)
- Home Improvement (1991 - 1999)
- Mad About You (1992 - 1999)
- Everybody Loves Raymond (1996 - 2005)
- The Fresh Prince of Bel-Air (1990 - 1996)
- Martin (1992 - 1997)
- The Bernie Mac Show (2001 - 2006)
- Everybody Hates Chris (2005 - 2009)
- Modern Family (2009 - 2020)
- Fresh Off the Boat (2015 - 2020)
- Black-ish (2014 - 2022)
- One Day at a Time (2017 - 2020)

=== Episode 2: Sex & The Sitcom ===
- The Donna Reed Show (1958 - 1966)
- I Love Lucy (1951 - 1957)
- I Dream of Jeannie (1965 - 1970)
- That Girl (1966 - 1971)
- The Mary Tyler Moore Show (1970 - 1977)
- Maude (1972 - 1978)
- Schitt's Creek (2015 - 2020)
- Bewitched (1964 - 1972)
- The Beverly Hillbillies (1962 - 1971)
- All In The Family (1971 - 1979)
- The Jeffersons (1975 - 1985)
- Soap (1977 - 1981)
- Transparent (2014 - 2019)
- Bosom Buddies (1980 - 1982)
- Three's Company (1977 - 1984)
- Too Close For Comfort (1980 - 1987)
- The Facts of Life (1979 - 1988)
- The Golden Girls (1985 - 1992)
- Seinfeld (1989 - 1998)
- Ellen (1994 - 1998)
- Will & Grace (1998 - 2006)
- Modern Family (2009 - 2020)
- Master of None (2015 - 2021)
- Black-ish (2014 - 2022)
- Better Things (2016 - 2022)
- Sex and the City (1998 - 2004)
- Girlfriends (2000 - 2008)
- Girls (2012 - 2017)
- Insecure (2016 - 2021)
- Fleabag (2016 - 2019)

=== Episode 3: Just Friends ===
- The Odd Couple (1970 - 1975)
- Welcome Back, Kotter (1975 - 1979)
- Happy Days (1974 - 1984)
- Laverne & Shirley (1976 - 1983)
- What's Happening!! (1976 - 1979)
- The Facts of Life (1979 - 1988)
- Cheers (1982 - 1993)
- The Golden Girls (1985 - 1992)
- Seinfeld (1989 - 1998)
- Living Single (1993 - 1998)
- Friends (1994 - 2004)
- Curb Your Enthusiasm (2000 - 2024)
- How I Met Your Mother (2005 - 2014)
- Community (2009 - 2015)
- New Girl (2011 - 2018)

=== Episode 4: Working for Laughs ===
- I Love Lucy (1951 - 1957)
- The Adventures of Ozzie and Harriet (1952 - 1966)
- The Dick Van Dyke Show (1961 - 1966)
- Your Show of Shows (1950 - 1954)
- My Three Sons (1960 - 1972)
- The Andy Griffith Show (1960 - 1968)
- The Mary Tyler Moore Show (1970 - 1977)
- The Bob Newhart Show (1972 - 1978)
- M*A*S*H (1972 - 1983)
- Barney Miller (1975 - 1982)
- Taxi (1978 - 1983)
- WKRP In Cincinnati (1978 - 1982)
- Who's the Boss? (1984 - 1992)
- Family Ties (1982 - 1989)
- Kate & Allie (1984 - 1989)
- Designing Women (1986 - 1993)
- Murphy Brown (1988 - 1998)
- The Larry Sanders Show (1992 - 1998)
- Scrubs (2001 - 2010)
- The Office (UK) (2001 - 2003)
- The Office (2005 - 2013)
- 30 Rock (2006 - 2013)
- Parks and Recreation (2009 - 2015)
- Brooklyn 99 (2013 - 2021)
- Veep (2012 - 2019)
- Mr. Mayor (2021 - 2022)
- Ted Lasso (2020+)
- Space Force (2020 - 2022)

=== Episode 5: Facing Race ===
- All In The Family (1971 - 1979)
- Sanford and Son (1972 - 1977)
- Good Times (1974 - 1979)
- The Jeffersons (1975 - 1985)
- Beulah (1950 - 1953)
- Amos 'n' Andy (1951 - 1953)
- The Golden Girls (1985 - 1992)
- 30 Rock (2006 - 2013)
- Father Knows Best (1954 - 1960)
- The Courtship of Eddie's Father (1969 - 1972)
- Julia (1968 - 1971)
- Chico and the Man (1974 - 1978)
- I Love Lucy (1951 - 1957)
- Diff'rent Strokes (1978 - 1986)
- The Cosby Show (1984 - 1992)
- A Different World (1987 - 1993)
- The Fresh Prince of Bel-Air (1990 - 1996)
- Martin (1992 - 1997)
- All-American Girl (1994 - 1995)
- Fresh Off the Boat (2015 - 2020)
- Sister, Sister (1994 - 1999)
- Moesha (1996 - 2001)
- The Bernie Mac Show (2001 - 2006)
- Everybody Hates Chris (2005 - 2009)
- King of the Hill (1997 - 2010)
- George Lopez (2002 - 2007)
- House of Payne (2007+)
- Black-ish (2014 - 2022)
- #blackAF (2020)
- Insecure (2016 - 2021)
- Atlanta (2016 - 2022)
- Ramy (2019 - 2022)
- Never Have I Ever (2020 - 2023)
- Awkwafina is Nora from Queens (2020 - 2023)

=== Episode 6: Movin' On Up ===
- Seinfeld (1989 - 1998)
- Atlanta (2016 - 2022)
- The Honeymooners (1955 - 1956)
- Father Knows Best (1954 - 1960)
- The Adventures of Ozzie and Harriet (1952 - 1966)
- The Andy Griffith Show (1960 - 1968)
- The Beverly Hillbillies (1962 - 1971)
- Green Acres (1965 - 1971)
- Petticoat Junction (1963 - 1970)
- All In The Family (1971 - 1979)
- Good Times (1974 - 1979)
- The Jeffersons (1975 - 1985)
- The Mary Tyler Moore Show (1970 - 1977)
- Alice (1976 - 1985)
- Family Ties (1982 - 1989)
- The Fresh Prince of Bel-Air (1990 - 1996)
- Roseanne (1988 - 1997)
- Frasier (1993 - 2004)
- Arrested Development (2003 - 2019)
- Malcolm in the Middle (2000 - 2006)
- 30 Rock (2006 - 2013)
- Everybody Hates Chris (2005 - 2009)
- Last Man Standing (2011 - 2021)
- It's Always Sunny in Philadelphia (2005+)
- The Conners (2018 - 2025)
- One Day at a Time (2017 - 2020)
- The Upshaws (2021+)
- The Last O.G. (2018 - 2021)
- Schitt's Creek (2015 - 2020)

=== Episode 7: Freaks, Geeks & Outsiders ===
- Mork & Mindy (1978 - 1982)
- ALF (1986 - 1990)
- My Favorite Martian (1963 - 1966)
- Happy Days (1974 - 1984)
- 3rd Rock from the Sun (1996 - 2001)
- Unbreakable Kimmy Schmidt (2015 - 2019)
- The Munsters (1964 - 1966)
- Leave It to Beaver (1957 - 1963)
- The Addams Family (1964 - 1966)
- Bewitched (1964 - 1972)
- I Dream of Jeannie (1965 - 1970)
- Sabrina the Teenage Witch (1996 - 2003)
- Bob Hearts Abishola (2019 - 2024)
- Never Have I Ever (2020 - 2023)
- Life with Luigi (1952)
- Mama (1949 - 1957)
- The Goldbergs (1949 - 1956)
- Taxi (1978 - 1983)
- Perfect Strangers (1986 - 1992)
- Freaks and Geeks (1999 - 2000)
- Blossom (1991 - 1995)
- Saved by the Bell (1989 - 1993)
- The Fresh Prince of Bel-Air (1990 - 1996)
- Silicon Valley (2014 - 2020)
- Family Matters (1989 - 1998)
- The Big Bang Theory (2007 - 2019)

=== Episode 8: Escaping Reality ===
- The Flintstones (1960 - 1966)
- Mister Ed (1961 - 1966)
- My Mother the Car (1965 - 1966)
- The Flying Nun (1967 - 1970)
- Gilligan's Island (1964 - 1967)
- Get Smart (1965 - 1970)
- Gomer Pyle, U.S.M.C. (1964 - 1969)
- Hogan's Heroes (1965 - 1971)
- The Love Boat (1977 - 1986)
- Happy Days (1974 - 1984)
- Mork & Mindy (1978 - 1982)
- Three's Company (1977 - 1984)
- Eight Is Enough (1977 - 1981)
- Night Court (1984 - 1992)
- The Bob Newhart Show (1972 - 1978)
- Newhart (1982 - 1990)
- Full House (1987 - 1995)
- The Simpsons (1989+)
- Family Guy (1999+)
- American Dad! (2005+)
- King of the Hill (1997 - 2010)
- South Park (1997+)
- The Boondocks (2005 - 2014)
- Dinosaurs (1991 - 1994)
- Bojack Horseman (2014 - 2020)
- The Good Place (2016 - 2020)
