= Chico and the Man =

American sitcom (1974–1978)

- Title screen
- Genre: Sitcom
- Created by: James Komack
- Directed by: Peter Baldwin; Jack Donohue; James Komack
- Starring: Jack Albertson; Freddie Prinze; Della Reese; Scatman Crothers; Bonnie Boland; Isaac Ruiz; Ronny Graham; Gabriel Meglar; Julie Hill
- Theme music composer: José Feliciano
- Opening theme: "Chico and the Man" performed by José Feliciano
- Country of origin: United States
- Original language: English
- No. of seasons: 4
- No. of episodes: 88 (list of episodes)

Production
- Executive producer: James Komack
- Producers: Hal Kanter; James Komack; Michael Morris; Ed Scharlach
- Camera setup: Multi-camera
- Running time: 22–24 minutes
- Production companies: The Komack Company Inc. Wolper Productions; Warner Bros. Television

Original release
- Network: NBC
- Release: September 13, 1974 – July 21, 1978

Chico and the Man is an American sitcom television series that aired on NBC for four seasons from September 13, 1974, to July 21, 1978. It stars Jack Albertson as Ed Brown (the Man), the cantankerous owner of a run-down garage in an East Los Angeles barrio, and Freddie Prinze (until Prinze's suicide in the third season) as Chico Rodriguez, an upbeat, optimistic young Mexican American who comes in looking for a job. It was the first American television series set in a Mexican-American neighborhood. Albertson won an Emmy as Best Actor in a Comedy Series in 1976.

== Conception ==
The series was created by James Komack who produced other successful TV shows such as The Courtship of Eddie's Father and Welcome Back, Kotter. Comedians Cheech Marin and Tommy Chong (better known as the comedic duo Cheech & Chong) have stated that Komack followed the comedians on tour for three months; Chong wrote in his 2009 book Cheech & Chong: The Unauthorized Autobiography that Komack based the show on Cheech and Chong skits titled "The Old Man in the Park" and "Pedro and Man" and had acknowledged that fact to Chong after the television series' release. Cheech and Chong have both stated that Komack had originally approached them to star in the show, but they turned down the offer, preferring to stick to films.

Komack told the Associated Press that he first tried working with Cheech and Chong on a show about a Chicano and a Nisei. Komack said he decided to make the show about a young Chicano and a "seventh-generation WASP" after he and the comedy team "couldn't get it together".

NBC suggested someone like Jack Albertson as Ed/"The Man", and Komack approached him. Though not impressed with the pilot script, Albertson agreed on the trust of Komack's reputation. Freddie Prinze was discovered by Komack who received a recommendation from a friend who saw Prinze's appearance on The Tonight Show Starring Johnny Carson in December 1973. Komack thought he would be perfect for the role of Chico Rodriguez. Though initially rejected by NBC executives, he stood out against two other finalists in testing.

The show's opening featured b-roll footage of the Gypsy Rose, also known as the "most famous lowrider in the world"— a 1964 Impala that has been in many museums and has been inducted into the National Historic Vehicle Register. Chico and the Man gave the viewer a glimpse of what lowrider culture was like in East LA and LA in the 1970s

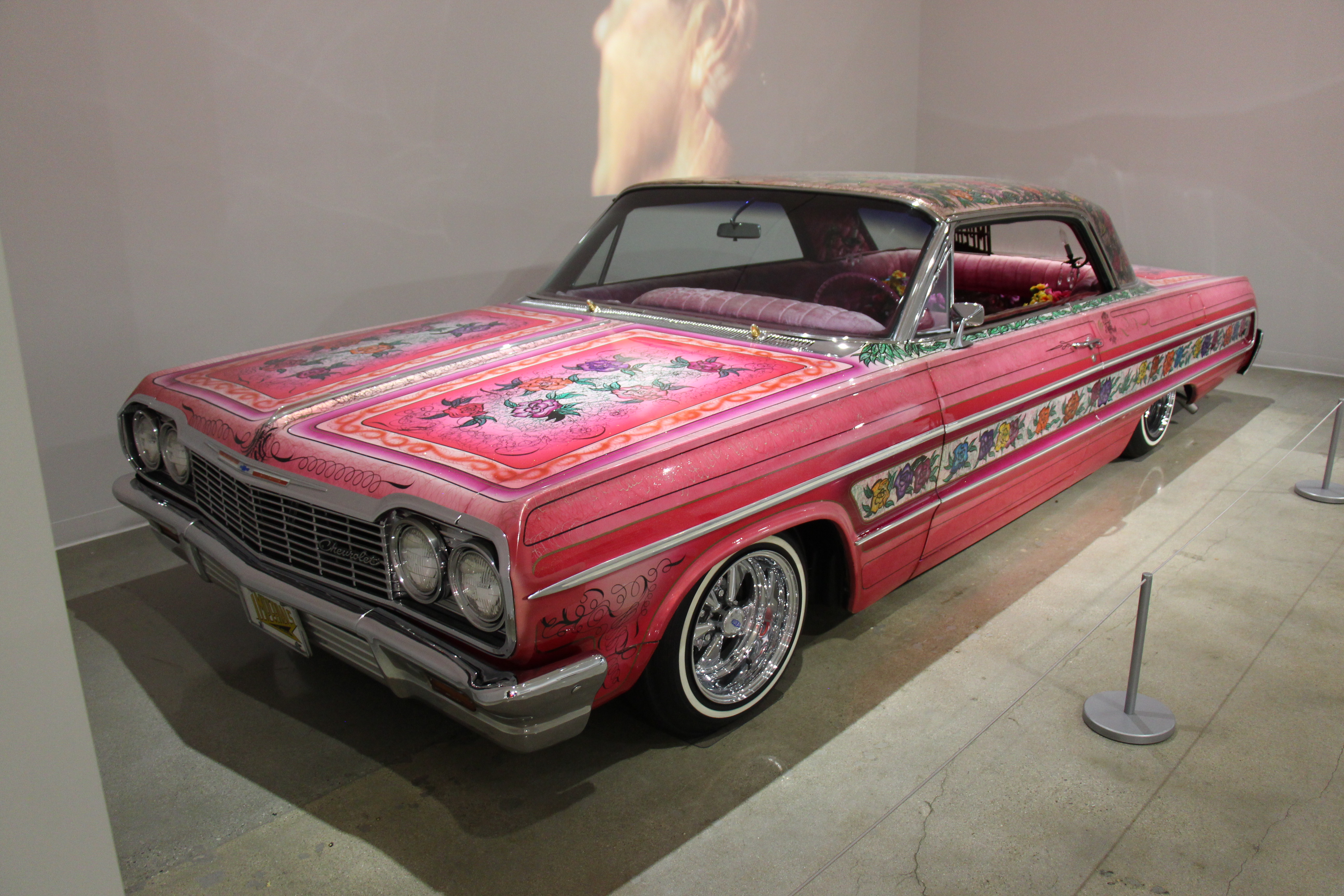
The 1964 Chevrolet Impala known as the Gypsy Rose was a famous lowrider seen in the opening of the 1970s TV show “Chico and the Man.”

== Synopsis ==
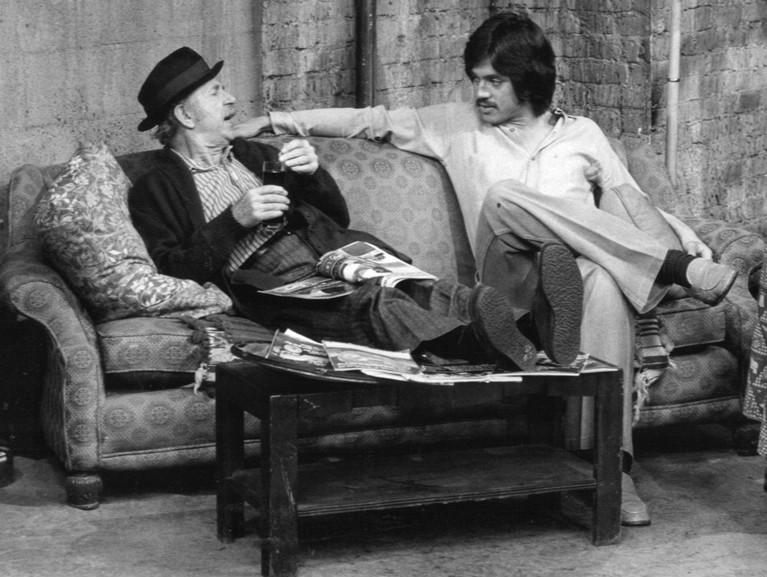
Jack Albertson and Freddie Prinze, 1976

A hard-drinking widower, Ed stubbornly refuses to fit in with the changing East L.A. neighborhood and has alienated most of the people who live around him. He uses ethnic slurs and berates Chico, a Latino, in an effort to get him to leave when Chico comes looking for a job. Yet Chico sees something in Ed, and sneaks back in at night to clean up the garage and move into an old van that Ed has parked inside. As Ed sees all the effort Chico has put in, he begins to warm up to Chico. Over the course of the show, Ed grows to see Chico as family, although Ed denies this on several occasions.

The chemistry between Jack Albertson's "Ed" and Freddie Prinze's "Chico" was a major factor in making the show a hit in its first two seasons. It debuted in the top 10 and remained in the top 30 for its second season.

As the show progressed, Chico's background was revealed as being Mexican on his father's side and Puerto Rican on his mother's side, and that "... my grandmother speaks a little Hungarian!" (though Prinze's paternal ancestry was actually German, in his stage-act he would claim his father was Hungarian, thereby allowing him to comically refer to himself as "Hungarican"). Chico was revealed to have spent part of his childhood in Hungary following the death of his mother, being raised by his aunt Connie (a character who appeared in two other episodes). Chico attempts to explain his situation to Ed by portraying it as the dilemma of his distant cousin in Hungary, torn between the farmer for whom he now works and whom he has grown to love, and another farmer who has offered him a better job. During this scene and this episode, the love between these disparate characters was made clear for the first time, which Chico's cousin Carlos (played by actor Richard Yniguez) notes when he releases Chico from his promise. By the second season, Ed begins to see that he is a part of a bigger world, although he still complains about it. By this time he has found himself a girlfriend by the name of Flora (played by Carole Cook).

The theme song was written and performed by José Feliciano.

=== Prinze's death ===
After struggling with depression and drug use, Freddie Prinze shot himself on January 28, 1977. He was taken off life support and died the following day at the age of 22.

The last episode to star Prinze, "Ed Talks to God", was taped several hours before Prinze's death.

==== Post-Prinze episodes ====
After Prinze's death, the producers considered canceling the show, but opted instead to try replacing the character. To write Chico out of the script, they had the other characters comment that he had gone to visit his father in Mexico. The third season finished out with three episodes without Chico, focusing on the other characters in the show.

In the opening episode of the fourth season, a replacement for Chico was introduced. Instead of an adult, the producers brought in 12-year-old Raul, played by Gabriel Melgar. His first appearance came when Ed and Louie go on a fishing trip to Tijuana and find the Mexican orphan hiding out in their trunk on their return. At the end of this episode, Ed is putting Raul to bed and accidentally calls him Chico. Raul corrects him and Ed remarks, "You're all Chicos to me." Ed eventually adopts Raul, only to have Raul's overprotective Aunt Charo – played by actress/singer Charo – come from Spain and try to become a part of the "family", as well.

A two-part episode ran in the final season in which Raul discovers Chico's belongings in a closet. Ed catches Raul playing Chico's guitar and Ed smashes it on the van in anger. Raul believes Ed does not love him anymore and runs away to Mexico. Ed goes after him and finally explains to Raul that Chico died, but did not say how, putting a measure of closure on the fate of Chico in the series.

In January 1978, after one further episode, NBC placed Chico and the Man on hiatus. The show returned in June, and the unaired episodes were broadcast through the summer of 1978, although one episode remained unaired during the final network run.

Toward the end of the show's final season, actress Julie Hill was added to the cast as Monica, Ed's 18-year-old adopted niece. She had come to Los Angeles to break into show business, and lived in Chico's old van while awaiting her big break. Chico and the Man was canceled at the end of the fourth season. The show's ratings declined steadily after Prinze's death and never recovered.

== Episodes ==
Season	Episodes	First aired	Last aired
1	22	September 13, 1974	March 14, 1975
2	22	September 12, 1975	March 3, 1976
3	21	October 1, 1976	April 8, 1977
4	23 (1 unaired)	September 16, 1977	July 21, 1978

== Supporting cast ==
The show also had a veteran and talented supporting cast. Scatman Crothers portrayed Louie Wilson, Ed's friend and garbageman; Bonnie Boland played Mabel, the mail lady; Isaac Ruiz portrayed Mando, Chico's friend; and Ronny Graham played Rev. Bemis. Also, Della Reese played Della Rogers, Ed's neighbor and landlady, and Jeannie Linero appeared in several episodes as one of Chico's more constant girlfriends, nurse Liz Garcia.

=== Notable guest stars ===
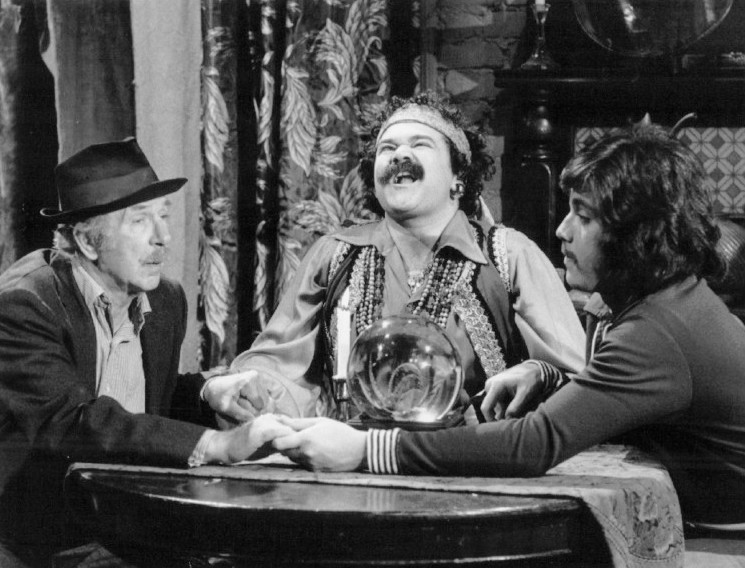
Avery Schreiber (center) is a very unsuccessful fortune teller Ed and Chico try giving a hand.

Other notable guest stars included:

- Cesar Romero as Chico's absentee father
- Tony Orlando as Chico's look-alike, the ex-fiancé of a hostile woman he wants to date
- José Feliciano, who wrote and performed the theme song, as Chico's womanizing famous-singer cousin Pepe Fernando
- Sammy Davis Jr. as himself
- Herbie Faye appeared as Bernie in the 1975 episode "Louie's Retirement".
- Shelley Winters (reuniting with Albertson, with whom she'd costarred in The Poseidon Adventure) as the owner of the local bakery, Shirley Schrift (her real name)
- Rodolfo Hoyos Jr., three guest-starring roles, including Hector Ramirez in "The Third Letter" (1977)
- Jim Backus as Ed's friend who uses him as a beard, pretending to be playing cards with him when cheating on his wife (Audra Lindley)
- Silent-film actress Carmel Myers as a former star who has fallen on hard times, brings in her car for repairs and stays in the garage while looking for work
- George Takei as Ed's supposed long-lost son from his time in Japan during World War II
- Cesare Danova as Aunt Connie's Spanish aristocrat boyfriend, the Count de Catalan, in the second episode in which she appeared
- Comedian Joey Bishop as an inept robber
- Bernie Kopell as a plastic surgeon
- Rose Marie as a CB radio enthusiast with whom a lonely Ed connects on New Year's Eve
- Penny Marshall, as a waitress
- Football star Rosey Grier as himself, Della's date for a charity benefit dance
- Larry Hovis as a customer in the second episode of the first season
- Jim Jordan (of radio's Fibber McGee and Molly) as a mechanic who used to be a big businessman until he was victimized by his own company's retirement-age mandate. This was one of a string of media appearances (and the only one he ever made in a TV series) the 80-year-old Jordan made in a brief late-1970s comeback.
- Alice Ghostley as a woman who wrongly accused Ed of being a peeping Tom.
- Trent Dolan as a secret service agent

== Broadcast history and Nielsen ratings ==
Season	Time slot (ET)	Rank	Rating
1974–75	Friday at 8:30-9:00 PM	3	28.5
1975–76	Friday at 8:30-9:00 PM (Episodes 1–16); Wednesday at 9:00-9:30 PM (Episodes 17–22)	25	20.8
1976–77	Friday at 8:30-9:00 PM	45	18.8
1977–78	Friday at 8:30-9:00 PM (Episodes 1–12, 14–22); Friday at 8:00-8:30 PM (Episode 13)	88	14.2

== Syndication ==
With 88 episodes, the series fell short of the 100 episodes most syndicators desired for a full rollout, and Prinze's death caused a sudden shift in the series that further made the show undesirable for reruns. The series has been shown in syndication in only a few markets and only for a relatively short period. NBC broadcast repeats of Chico and the Man briefly on weekday mornings from May 9 to December 2, 1977.

Nickelodeon’s TV Land network also broadcast reruns during 2001 as did ION Television in 2007. AmericanLife TV Network also aired this series previously, as well as WGN-TV in Chicago.

In Canada, the show previously appeared on Sun TV (CKXT-TV) in Toronto.

In Italy, the show aired on Rete 4 in 1984.

From 2005 to 2009, episodes of the show were available on AOL's now-defunct video website called In2TV.

The complete series began streaming on Tubi in December 2023.

== Home media ==
On September 27, 2005, six episodes of Chico and the Man were released on DVD as part of Warner Bros.' Television Favorites compilation series and the episodes are as follows:

- "Pilot" (September 13, 1974): Chico tries to persuade Ed to give him a job in the garage.
- "If I Were a Rich Man" (January 31, 1975): Chico has fallen head over heels in love and Ed is trying to turn him right side up.
- "Chico and the Van" (October 17, 1975): A city official claims Chico's van is illegal, so he moves in with Ed.
- "Chico's Cousin Pepe" (February 11, 1976): Chico's blind, woman-chasing, singing cousin Pepe visits.
- "Chico's Padre" (February 4, 1977): Chico's long-lost rich father, Gilberto, returns to give him a better life.
- "Ed Talks to God" (March 4, 1977): Chico tries to change Ed's mind about not attending his own birthday party by having Ed's old friend impersonate God.
