= The History of Comedy =

- Country of origin: United States
- Original language: English
- No. of seasons: 2

Original release
- Network: CNN
- Release: February 9, 2017

The History of Comedy is a CNN documentary series, as part of CNN Original Series.

The documentary explores the underlying questions of what makes American people laugh, why, and how the laughter influenced their social and political landscape throughout American history.

The show utilizes archival footage, punctuated by contemporary interviews with comedians and scholars.

== Series overview ==
Season	Episodes	Originally released	
Season	Episodes	First released	Last released
1	8	February 9, 2017	August 13, 2017
2	6	July 16, 2018	August 19, 2018

== Episodes ==
=== Season 1 (2017) ===
No. overall	No. in season	Title	Original release date
1	1	"F***ing Funny"	February 9, 2017
Diving into the history of "blue comedy" and its role in breaking taboos and changing the culture of comedy.
2	2	"The Funnier Sex"	February 16, 2017
Exploring and celebrating the greatest female comedians of all time and how they were able to succeed in every genre where humor is found despite rampant sexism and prejudice.
3	3	"The Comedy of Real Life"	February 23, 2017
Examining how comedians find humor in the simple daily experiences we all share to make us laugh.
4	4	"One Nation, Under Comedy (a.k.a. Cultural Divide)"	July 16, 2017
Exploring the evolution of racial humor; how comedy can cross cultural barriers to unite people.
5	5	"Ripped From the Headlines"	July 23, 2017
The origins of topical humor are traced, from the invention of the monologue, to the "fake news" shows of today.
6	6	"Spark of Madness"	July 30, 2017
Exploring the fascinating mind of the comedian and the difficult road that many seem destined to take- where mental illness and substance abuse are remarkably common.
7	7	"Making Fun (a.k.a. Parody & Satire)"	August 6, 2017
Demonstrating how effective and funny it can be when you look at something serious, and just twist it ever so slightly.
8	8	"Politics Aside"	August 13, 2017
Examining the many different ways that comedy has lampooned and influenced politics over the years.

=== Season 2 (2018) ===
No. overall	No. in season	Title	Original release date
9	1	"Carnal Knowledge"	July 15, 2018
How sexual humor, one of the oldest forms of comedy, pushes the limits of both comfort and political correctness.
10	2	"Sketch & Improv"	July 22, 2018
Exploring the history of sketch and improv comedy and how it evolved into a significant part of comedic talent today.
11	3	"Drawn to Be Funny"	July 29, 2018
The history between animation and comedy.
12	4	"Gone Too Soon"	August 5, 2018
Exploring the passing of comedic legends and how the connection with their audiences make the loss more significant.
13	5	"In It Together"	August 12, 2018
The history of comedic duos and the evolution of comedy teams.
14	6	"No Offense"	August 19, 2018
Exploring family-friendly comedy and the struggles of abiding by strict network censors.

== Profiles ==
The following comedians and satirists were featured at one point or another during the series.

=== Comedians ===
- Tim Allen
- Woody Allen
- Louie Anderson
- Aziz Ansari
- Lucille Ball
- Maria Bamford
- Charlie Barnett
- Roseanne Barr
- Samantha Bee
- W. Kamau Bell
- John Belushi
- Lewis Black
- Herbert Block
- Elayne Boosler
- Albert Brooks
- Mel Brooks
- Lenny Bruce
- Carol Burnett
- Sid Caesar
- John Candy
- George Carlin
- Jean Carroll
- Dave Chappelle
- Margaret Cho
- Andrew Dice Clay
- Stephen Colbert
- Bill Cosby
- Whitney Cummings
- Chris Farley
- Craig Ferguson
- Tina Fey
- Totie Fields
- Redd Foxx
- Jim Gaffigan
- Greg Giraldo
- Whoopi Goldberg
- Bobcat Goldthwait
- Dick Gregory
- Mitch Hedberg
- Bill Hicks
- Pete Holmes
- Andy Kaufman
- Sam Kinison
- Richard Lewis
- George Lopez
- Moms Mabley
- Bernie Mac
- Bill Maher
- Marc Maron
- Steve Martin
- Elaine May
- Vaughn Meader
- Mo'Nique
- Eddie Murphy
- Tig Notaro
- Patrice O'Neal
- Patton Oswalt
- Russell Peters
- Chonda Pierce
- Freddie Prinze
- Richard Pryor
- Gilda Radner
- Carl Reiner
- Don Rickles
- Joan Rivers
- Chris Rock
- Mort Sahl
- Amy Schumer
- Jerry Seinfeld
- Garry Shandling
- Sarah Silverman
- Sinbad
- Sommore
- Jon Stewart
- Lily Tomlin
- Betty White
- Robin Williams
- Jonathan Winters
- Harris Wittels
- Ali Wong
- "Weird Al" Yankovic

== History of the Sitcom ==
In 2021, CNN followed their comedy history docuseries with History of the Sitcom, an eight-part series which traced the development of the American situation comedy show from the 1950s to the 21st century. The show features 184 interviews with creatives, actors and directors including Norman Lear, Mel Brooks and Carl Reiner (in his last recorded interview).
