= The 200th Episode Celebration of All in the Family =

- All in the Family episode
- Episode no.: Season 9
- Directed by: Walter C. Miller
- Written by: Norman Lear; Mort Lachman; Milt Josefsberg
- Editing by: Hal Collins; Harvey Berger
- Original air date: March 4, 1979
- Running time: 90 minutes

Guest appearances
- Carroll O'Connor; Jean Stapleton; Rob Reiner; Sally Struthers

Episode chronology
← Previous "Edith Gets Fired"	Next → "The Family Next Door"

"The 200th Episode Celebration of All in the Family" is a 90-minute retrospective of the American television sitcom All in the Family starring Carroll O'Connor, Jean Stapleton, Rob Reiner and Sally Struthers which aired on March 4, 1979, on CBS. It was directed by Walter C. Miller, hosted by Norman Lear and videotaped on February 19, 1979, in front of a live audience at Mark Taper Forum of the Los Angeles Music Center in Los Angeles, California.

== Overview ==
The special celebrates the 200th episode of All in the Family and is hosted by the show's creator, Norman Lear. Lear addresses a theater filled with 100 couples who have traveled from 48 states for the celebration and explains that the evening will feature "choice moments" from the long-running series. A variety of episode clips are then screened, grouped thematically by topic, including groundbreaking television moments, political arguments between Mike and Archie, Edith's character, Christianity, Archie's bigotry and human sexuality.

Between screenings, Lear discusses the program's groundbreaking role in bringing real-life subject matters to television – material that had been censored in the past. Lear quotes Time magazine, in which a writer said of the content of network entertainment shows, "By and large any subjects were fair game, except those that bore on the reality of viewer's lives." Lear also describes some of the criticism All in the Family has received.

Lear introduces a further series of clips from the show, characterizing the theme of the clips as "a celebration of life". Next, Lear talks about censorship and the strides made by All in the Family. The last clip of the evening is from the episode "The Stivics Go West" (season 8, episode 24) in which Mike and Gloria move away to California. Finally, Lear introduces the cast members who walk onstage to join him: Sally Struthers, Rob Reiner, Jean Stapleton and Carroll O'Connor. The program closes with glimpses of the after-show party at the Los Angeles Music Center, during which the guests mingle with the cast members.

== Featured episode clips ==
- "The Unemployment Story: Part 1" (October 6, 1976)
- "Edith's Christmas Story" (December 22, 1973)
- "Edith's 50th Birthday" (October 16, 1977)
- ""Flashback: Mike Meets Archie" (October 16, 1971)
- "We're Having a Heat Wave" (September 15, 1973)
- "Cousin Maude's Visit" (December 11, 1971)
- "Archie and the Editorial" (September 16, 1972)
- "Mike Comes Into Money" (November 4, 1972)
- "The Draft Dodger" (December 25, 1976)
- "Archie and Edith, Alone" (February 5, 1972)
- "Amelia's Divorce" (January 25, 1975)
- "Mike and Gloria Meet" (December 11, 1977)
- "Edith's Night Out" (March 8, 1976)
- "Judging Books by Covers" (February 9, 1971)
- "Chain Letter" (October 20, 1975)
- "Two's a Crowd" (February 12, 1978)
- "Mike's Problem" (November 20, 1971)
- "The Very Moving Day" (September 8, 1975)
- "Archie's Operation: Part 1" (October 20, 1976)
- "Archie's Brief Encounter: Part 3" (September 29, 1976)
- "Birth of the Baby: Part 2" (December 22, 1975)
- "The Stivics Go West" (March 19, 1978)

== Production notes ==
To celebrate the 200th episode of All in the Family, more than 750 people (including 200 contest winners who traveled from 48 states) were selected in a random drawing for an all-expense-paid trip to Los Angeles; it is reported that more than 300,000 people had entered the contest.

The contest winners flew to Los Angeles on Saturday, February 17, 1979, and were treated to a holiday weekend of sightseeing and dinners. The All in the Family celebration, which included numerous other fans and supporters of the show, concluded on Monday, February 19 with a gathering at the Mark Taper Forum for a taping of the special followed by an after-show party at the Los Angeles Music Center attended by the cast members.

== Award nomination ==
Nominated: 1979 Primetime Emmy Award – Outstanding Video Tape Editing for a Series (Harvey W. Berger, Hal Collins)
