= 31st Golden Globe Awards =

Film award ceremony in 1974

- Date: January 26, 1974

The 31st Golden Globe Awards, honoring the best in film and television for 1973, were held on January 26, 1974.

George Roy Hill's The Sting, which in April 1974 would win seven Academy Awards including Best Picture and Best Director, generated a Golden Globe nomination only for Best Screenplay.

== Winners and nominees ==
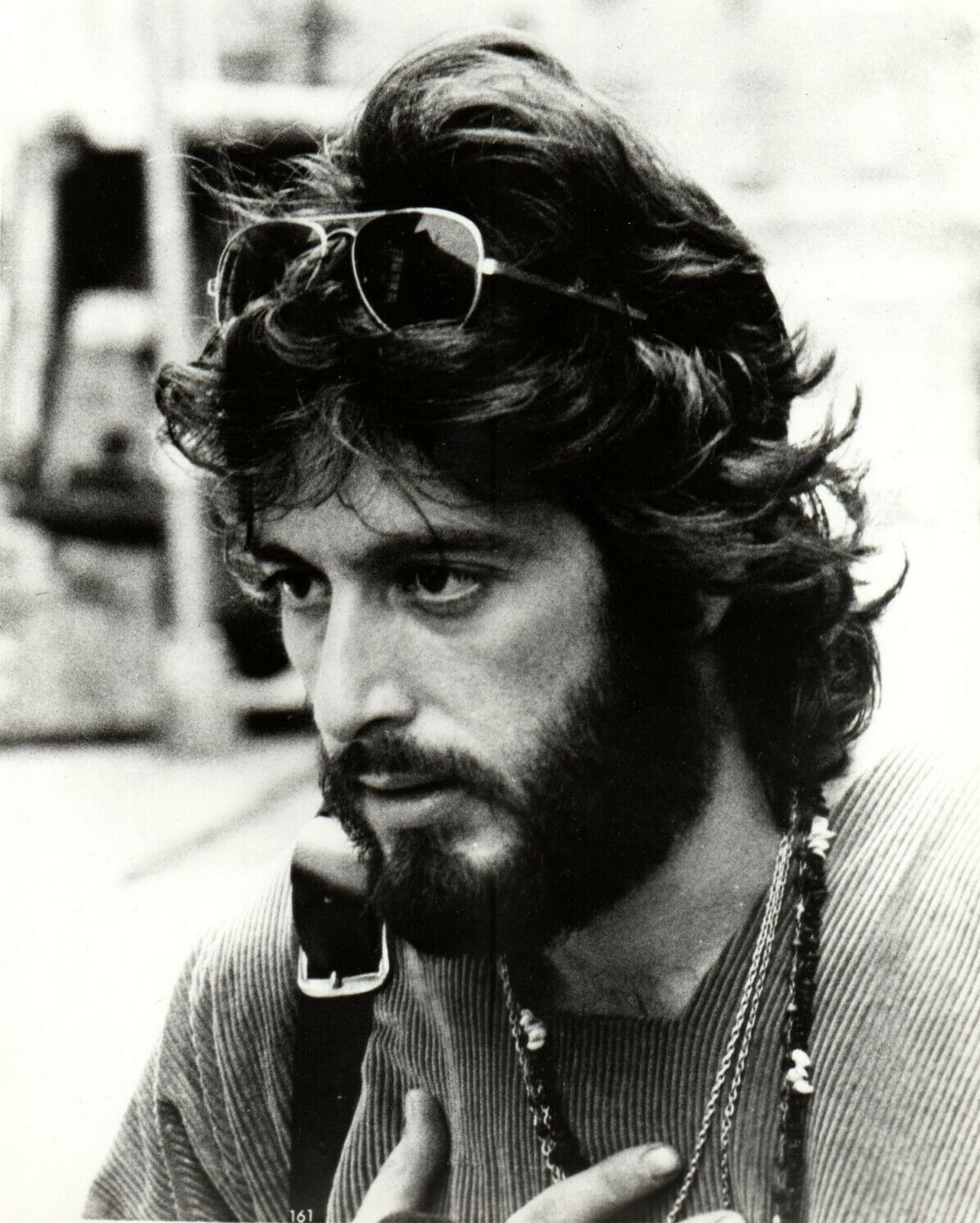
Al Pacino — Best Actor in a Motion Picture, Drama winner

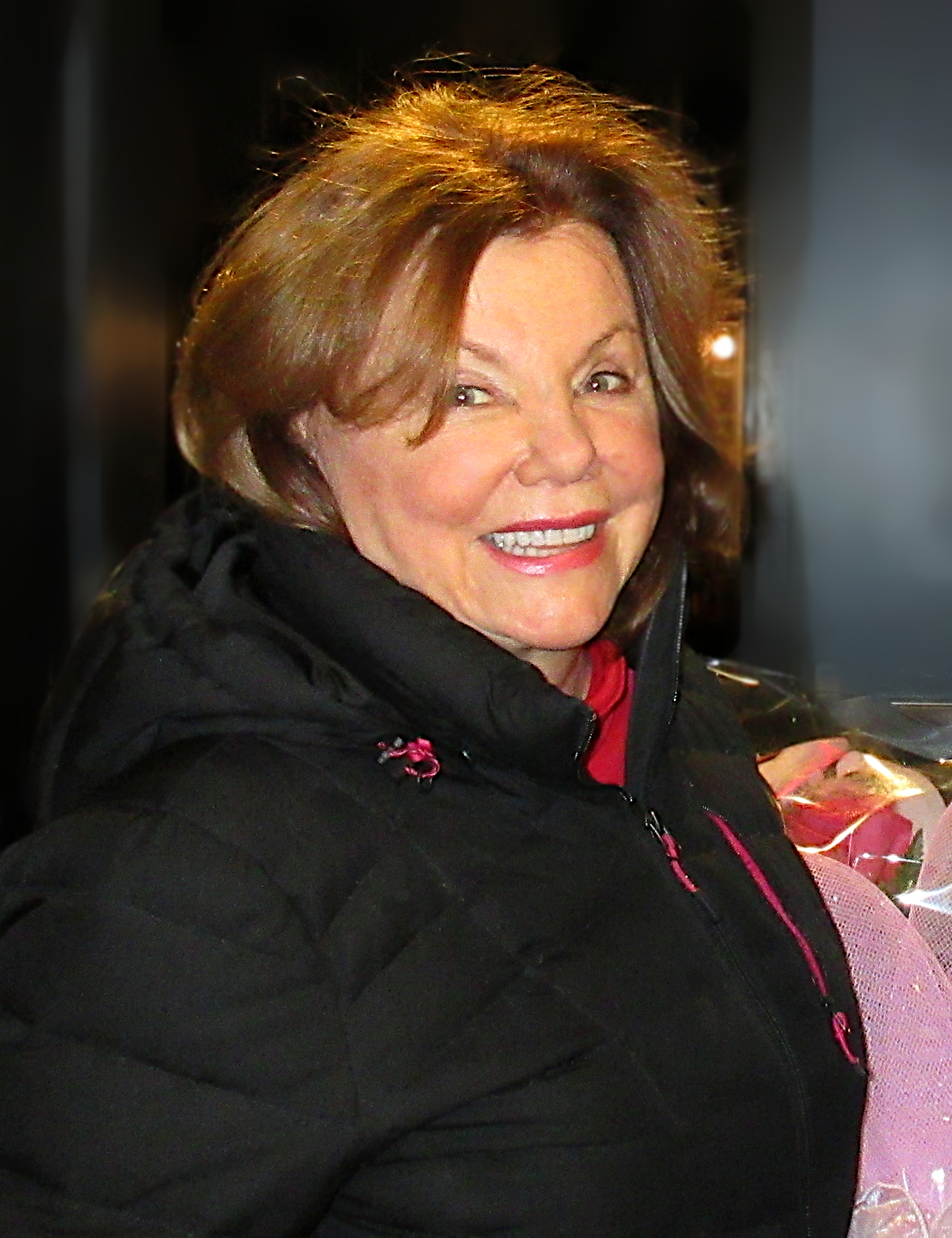
Marsha Mason — Best Actress in a Motion Picture, Drama winner

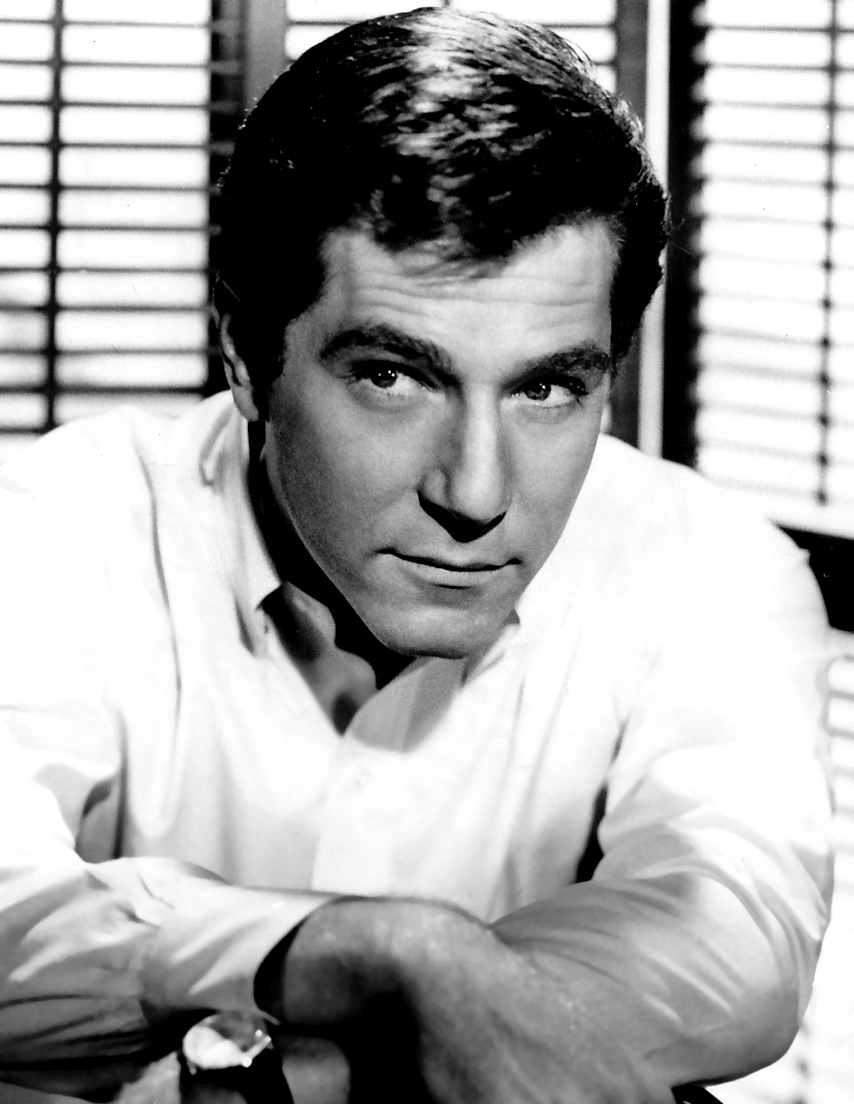
George Segal — Best Actor in a Motion Picture – Musical or Comedy winner

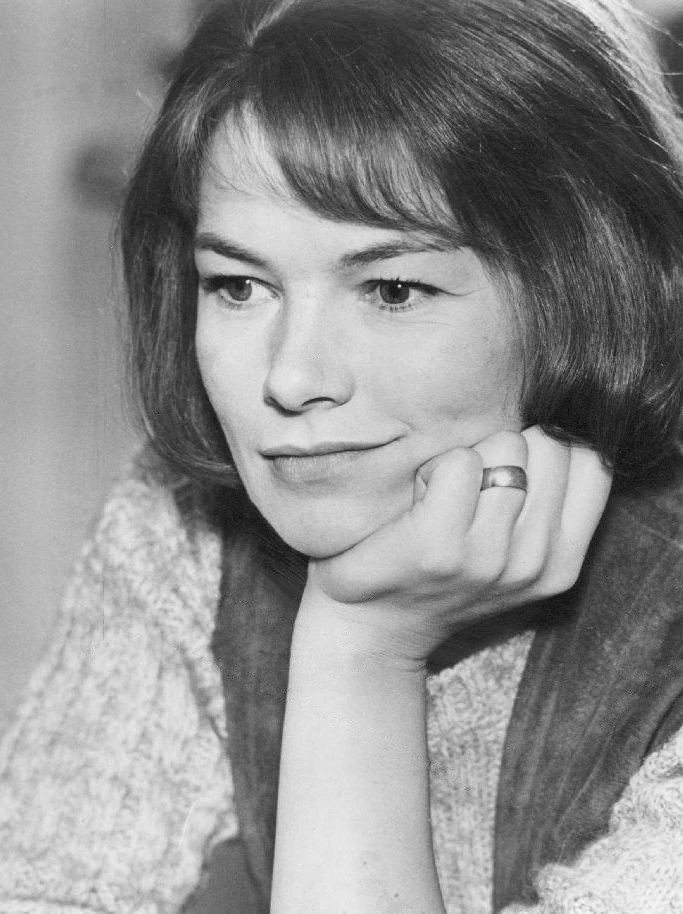
Glenda Jackson — Best Actress in a Motion Picture, Comedy or Musical winner

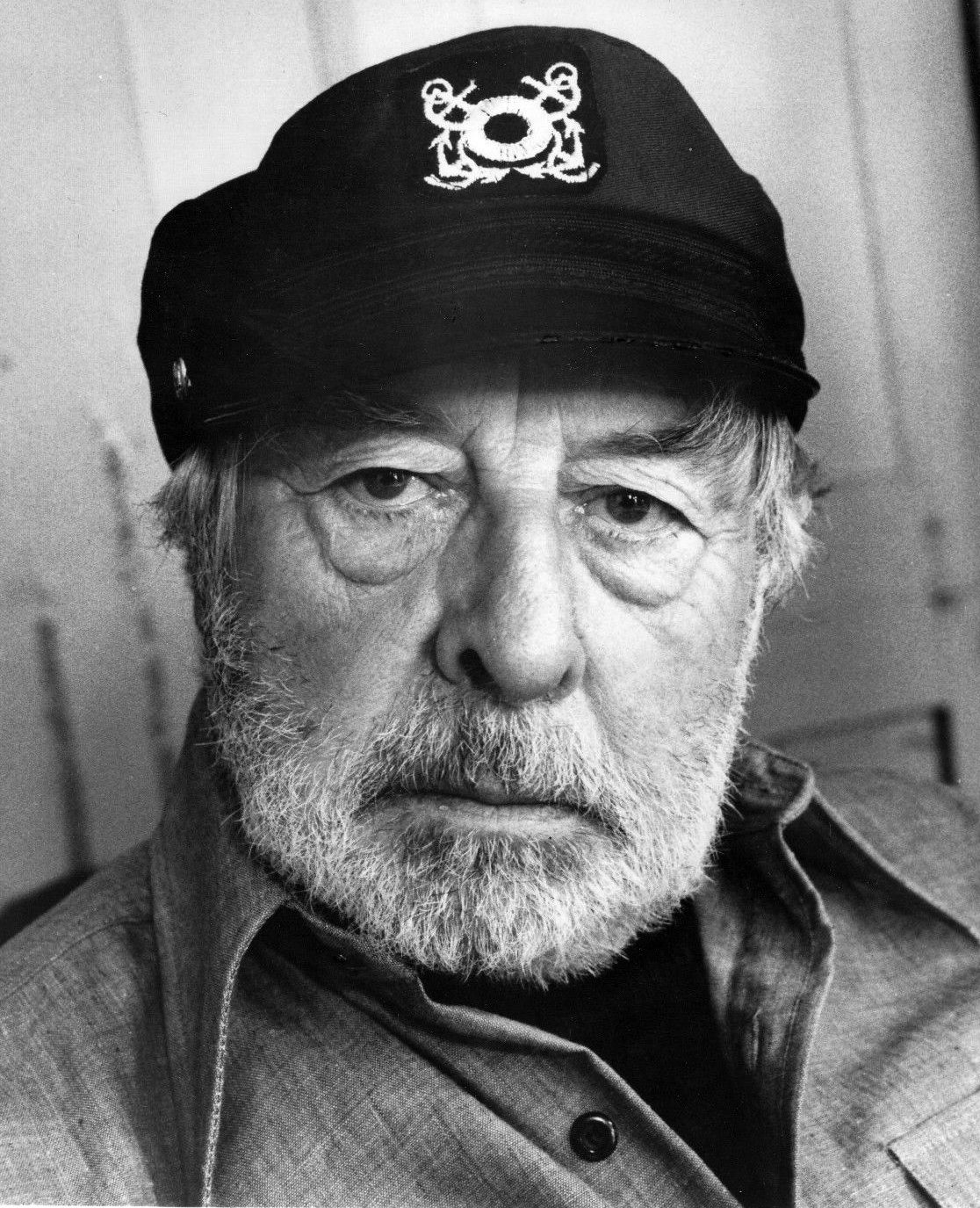
John Houseman — Best Supporting Actor in a Motion Picture, winner

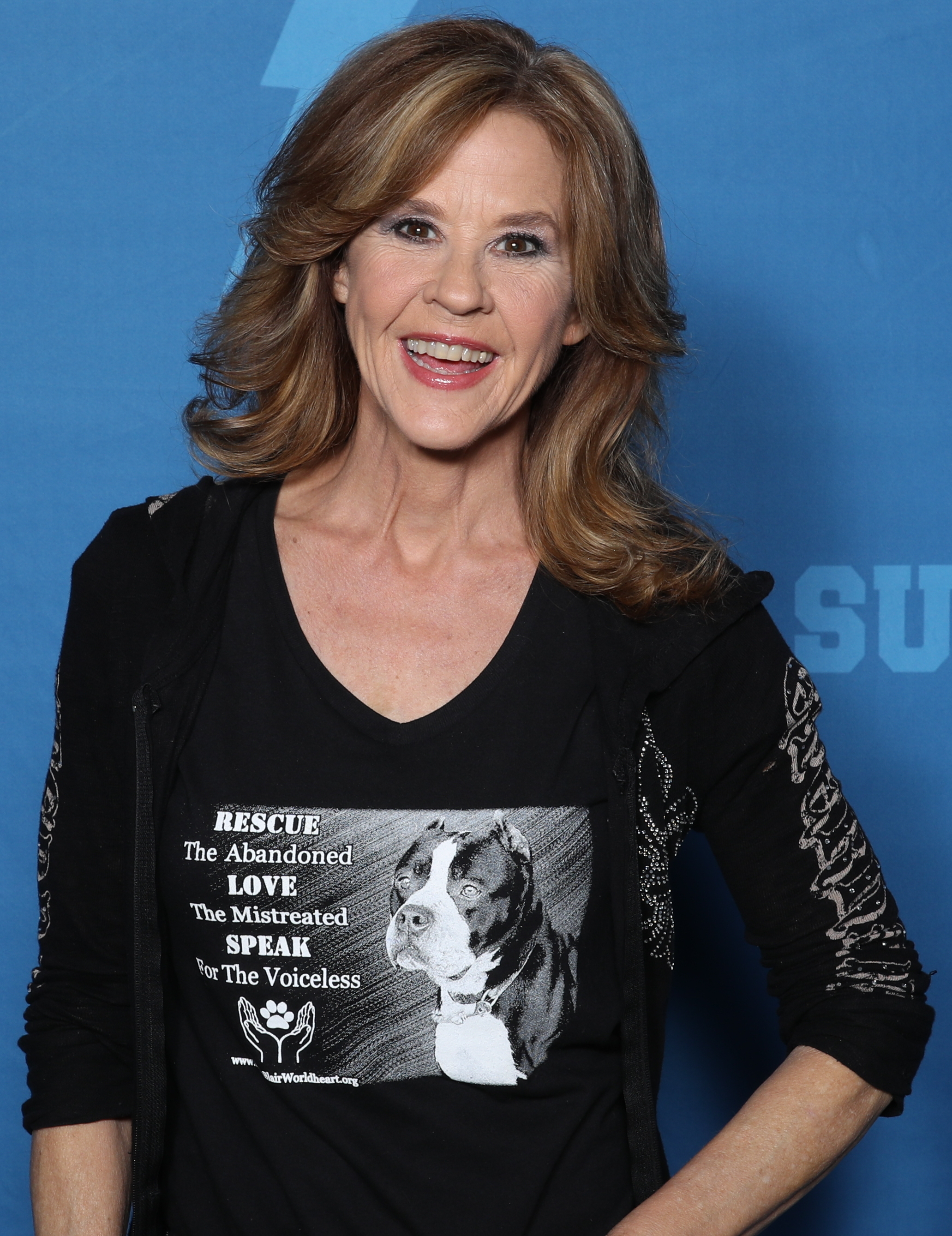
Linda Blair — Best Supporting Actress in a Motion Picture, winner

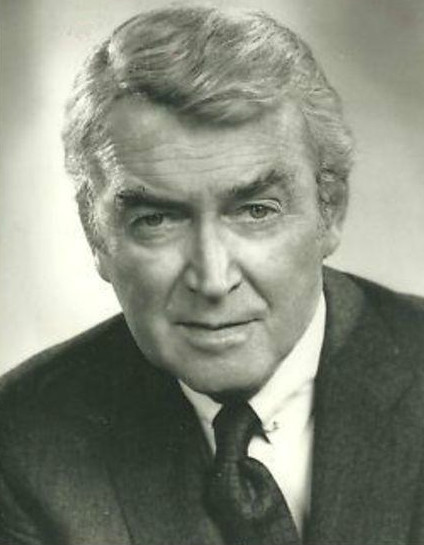
James Stewart — Best Actor in a Television Series, Drama winner

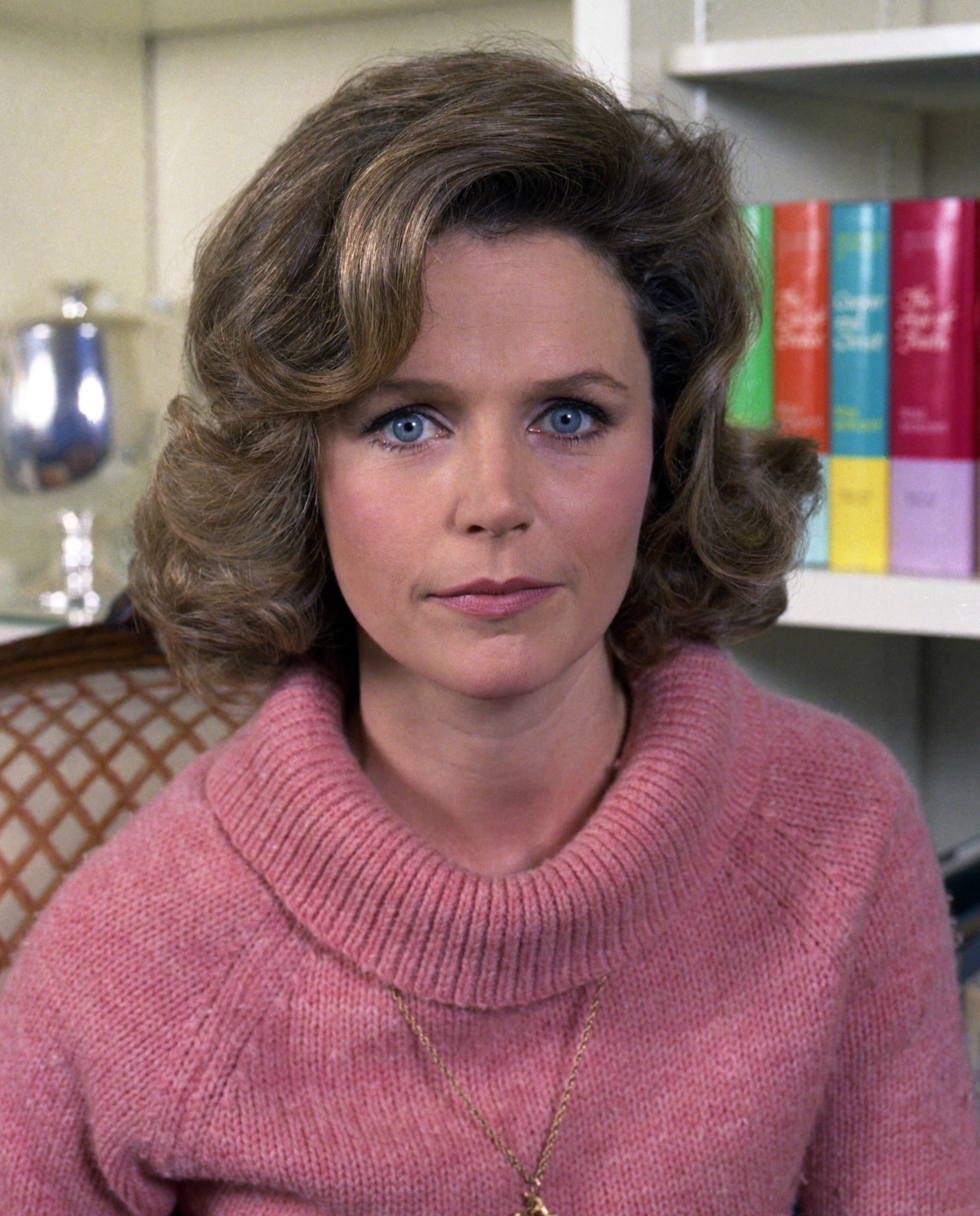
Lee Remick — Best Actress in a Television Series, Drama winner

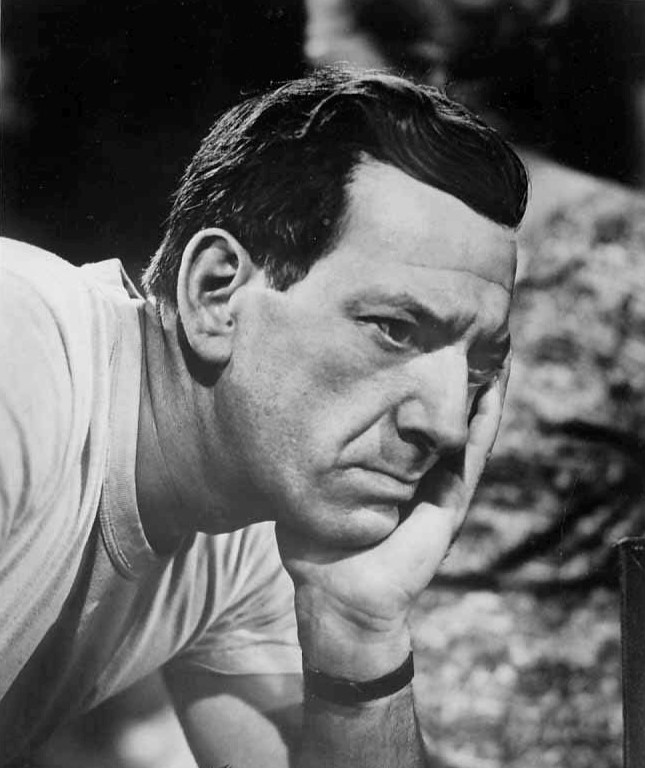
Jack Klugman — Best Actor in a Television Series, Comedy or Musical winner

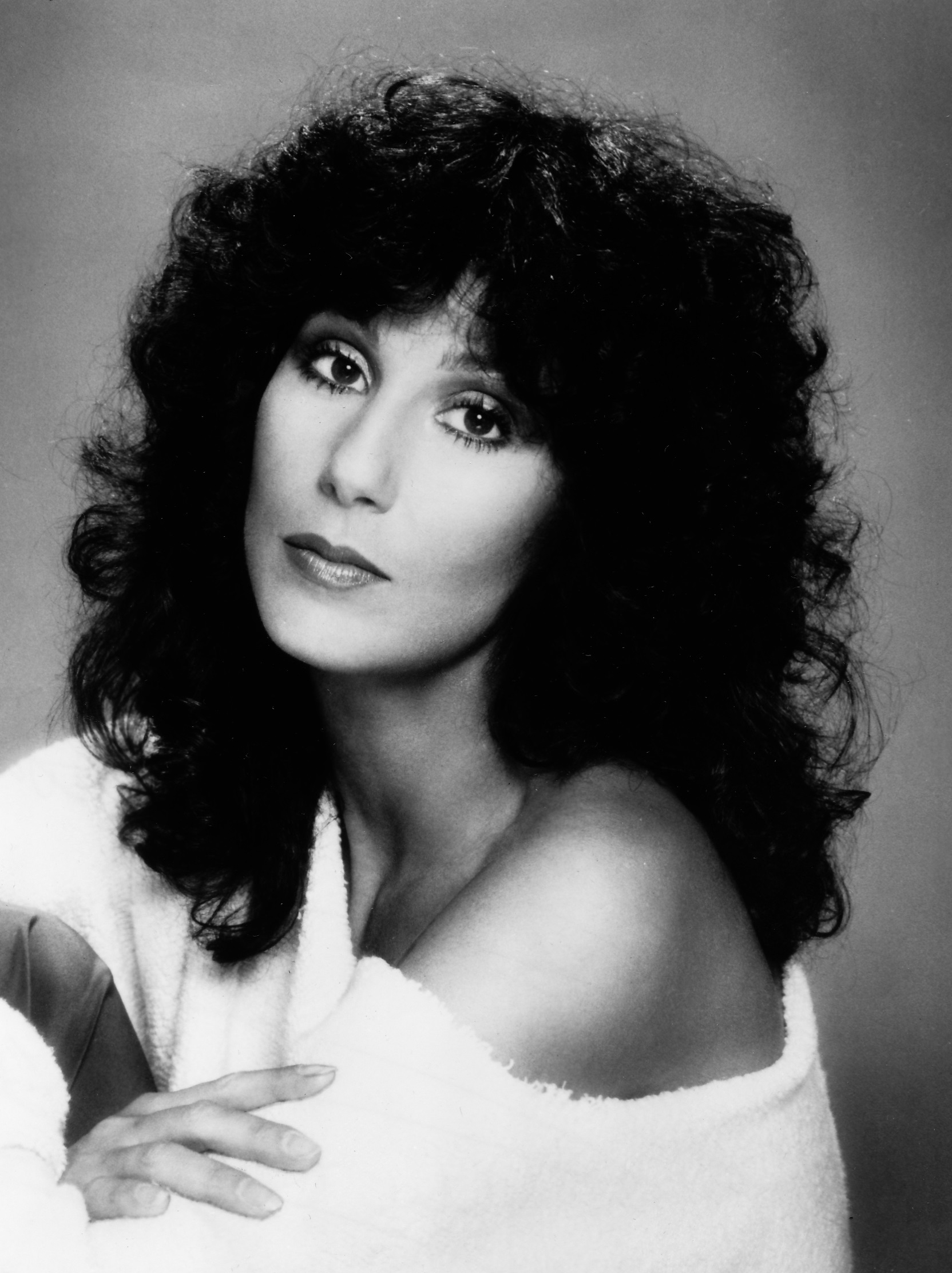
Cher — Best Actress in a Television Series, Comedy or Musical co-winner

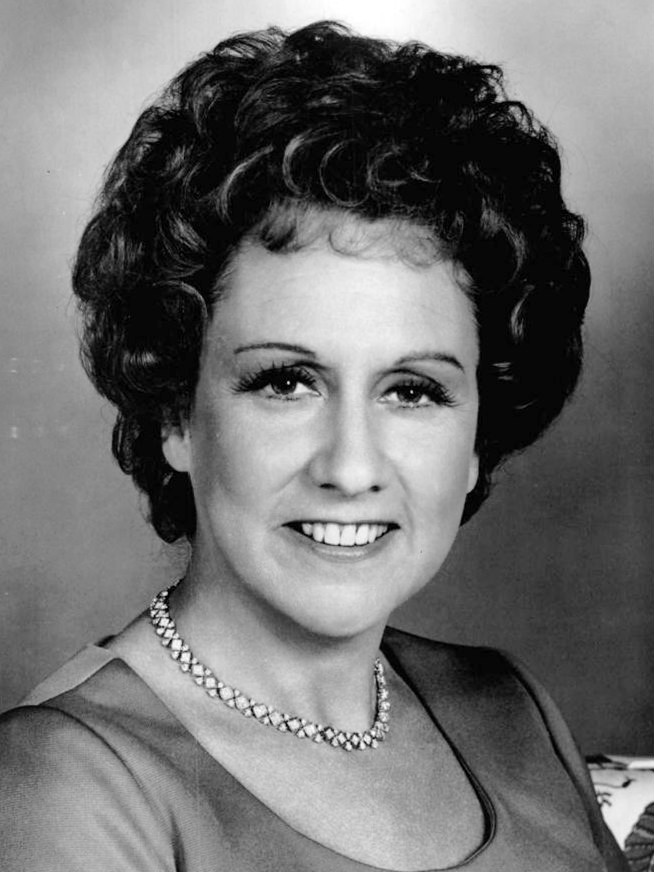
Jean Stapleton — Best Actress in a Television Series, Comedy or Musical co-winner

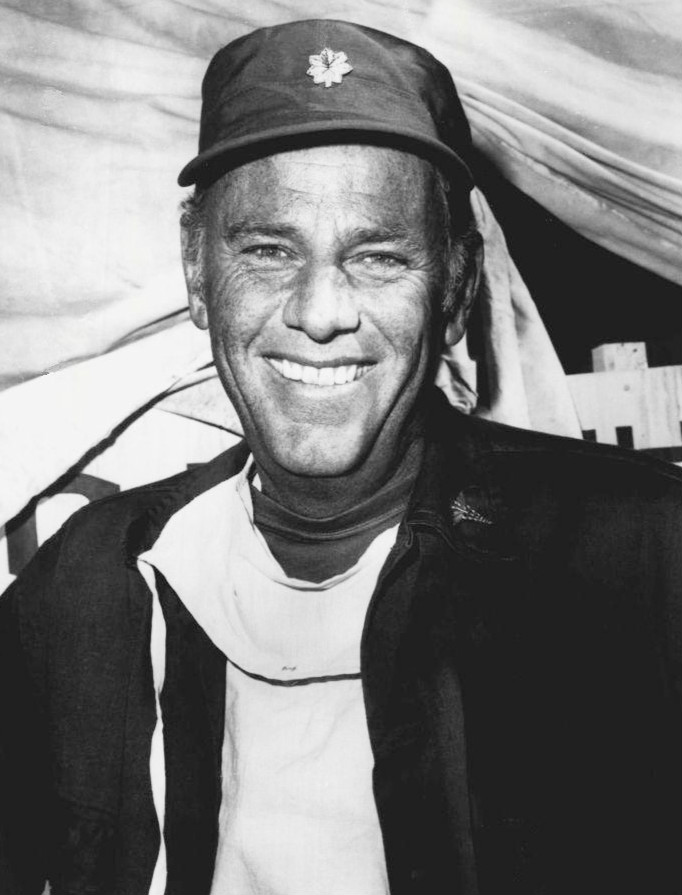
McLean Stevenson — Best Supporting Actor in a Series, Miniseries or Television Film winner

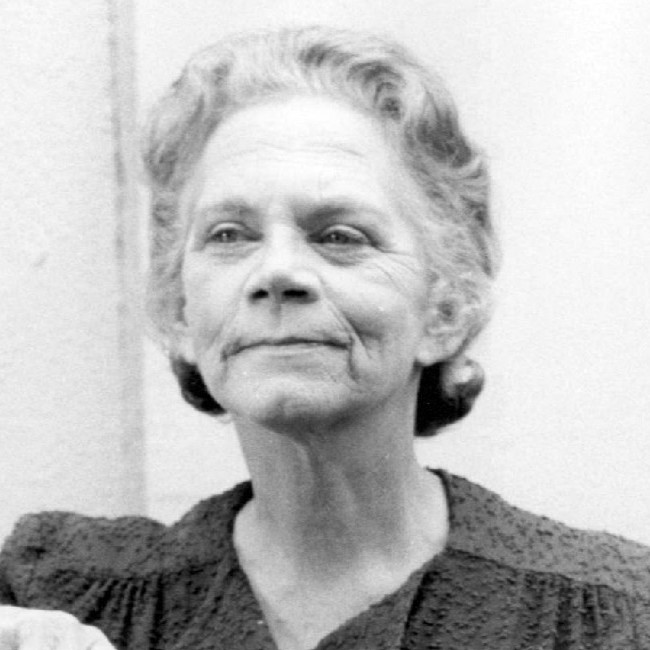
Ellen Corby — Best Supporting Actress in a Series, Miniseries or Television Film winner

=== Film ===
Best Motion Picture
Drama	Comedy or Musical
The Exorcist; Cinderella Liberty; The Day of the Jackal; Last Tango in Paris; Save the Tiger; Serpico	American Graffiti; Jesus Christ Superstar; Paper Moon; Tom Sawyer; A Touch of Class
Best Performance in a Motion Picture – Drama
Actor	Actress
Al Pacino – Serpico as Frank Serpico; Robert Blake – Electra Glide in Blue as John Wintergreen; Jack Lemmon – Save the Tiger as Harry Stoner; Steve McQueen – Papillon as Henri "Papillon" Charrière; Jack Nicholson – The Last Detail as Signalman 1st Class Billy L. "Badass" Buddusky	Marsha Mason – Cinderella Liberty as Maggie Paul; Ellen Burstyn – The Exorcist as Chris MacNeil; Barbra Streisand – The Way We Were as Kate Morosky; Elizabeth Taylor – Ash Wednesday as Barbara Sawyer; Joanne Woodward – Summer Wishes, Winter Dreams as Rita Walden
Best Performance in a Motion Picture – Comedy or Musical
Actor	Actress
George Segal – A Touch of Class as Steve Blackburn; Carl Anderson – Jesus Christ Superstar as Judas Iscariot; Richard Dreyfuss – American Graffiti as Curt Henderson; Ted Neeley – Jesus Christ Superstar as Jesus Christ; Ryan O'Neal – Paper Moon as Moses Pray	Glenda Jackson – A Touch of Class as Vicky Allesio; Yvonne Elliman – Jesus Christ Superstar as Mary Magdalene; Cloris Leachman – Charley and the Angel as Nettie Appleby; Tatum O'Neal – Paper Moon as Addie Loggins; Liv Ullmann – 40 Carats as Ann Stanley
Best Supporting Performance in a Motion Picture – Drama, Comedy or Musical
Supporting Actor	Supporting Actress
John Houseman – The Paper Chase as Charles W. Kingsfield Jr.; Martin Balsam – Summer Wishes, Winter Dreams as Harry Walden; Jack Gilford – Save the Tiger as Phil Greene; Randy Quaid – The Last Detail as Meadows; Max von Sydow – The Exorcist as Father Merrin	Linda Blair – The Exorcist as Regan MacNeil; Valentina Cortese – Day for Night as Severine; Madeline Kahn – Paper Moon as Trixie Delight; Kate Reid – A Delicate Balance as Claire; Sylvia Sidney – Summer Wishes, Winter Dreams as Mrs. Pritchett
Other
Best Director	Best Screenplay
William Friedkin – The Exorcist; Bernardo Bertolucci – Last Tango in Paris; Peter Bogdanovich – Paper Moon; George Lucas – American Graffiti; Fred Zinnemann – The Day of the Jackal	The Exorcist – William Peter Blatty; Cinderella Liberty – Darryl Ponicsan; The Day of the Jackal – Kenneth Ross; The Sting – David S. Ward; A Touch of Class – Melvin Frank and Jack Rose
Best Original Score	Best Original Song
Jonathan Livingston Seagull – Neil Diamond; Breezy – Michel Legrand; Cinderella Liberty – John Williams; The Day of the Dolphin – Georges Delerue; O Lucky Man! – Alan Price; Tom Sawyer – Richard M. Sherman, Robert B. Sherman and John Williams	"The Way We Were" (Marvin Hamlisch, Alan and Marilyn Bergman) – The Way We Were; "All That Love Went to Waste" (George Barrie, Sammy Cahn) – A Touch of Class; "Breezy's Song" (Michel Legrand, Alan and Marilyn Bergman) – Breezy; "Lonely Looking Sky" (Neil Diamond) – Jonathan Livingston Seagull; "Rosa Rosa" (Dov Seltzer, Haim Hefer) – Kazablan; "Send a Little Love My Way" (Henry Mancini, Hal David) – Oklahoma Crude
Best Foreign Film	Best Documentary Film
The Pedestrian (West Germany); Alfredo, Alfredo (Italy); Day for Night (France); Kazablan (Israel); State of Siege (France)	Visions of Eight; Love; The Movies That Made Us; The Second Gun; Wattstax
New Star of the Year – Actor	New Star of the Year – Actress
Paul Le Mat – American Graffiti as John Milner; Carl Anderson – Jesus Christ Superstar as Judas Iscariot; Robby Benson – Jeremy as Jeremy Jones; Kirk Calloway – Cinderella Liberty as Doug; Ted Neeley – Jesus Christ Superstar as Jesus Christ	Tatum O'Neal – Paper Moon as Addie Loggins; Linda Blair – The Exorcist as Regan MacNeil; Kay Lenz – Breezy as Edith Alice "Breezy" Breezerman; Michelle Phillips – Dillinger as Evelyn "Billie" Frechette; Barbara Sigel – Time to Run as Michelle

The following films received multiple nominations:

Nominations	Title
7	The Exorcist
6	Jesus Christ Superstar
6	Paper Moon
5	A Touch of Class
4	American Graffiti
4	Cinderella Liberty
3	Breezy
3	The Day of the Jackal
3	Save the Tiger
3	Summer Wishes, Winter Dreams
2	Day for Night
2	Jonathan Livingston Seagull
2	Kazablan
2	The Last Detail
2	Last Tango in Paris
2	Serpico
2	Tom Sawyer
2	The Way We Were

The following films received multiple wins:

Wins	Title
4	The Exorcist
2	American Graffiti
2	A Touch of Class

=== Television ===
Best Television Series
Drama	Musical or Comedy
The Waltons: Cannon; Columbo; Hawkins; Mannix; Police Story	All in the Family: The Carol Burnett Show; The Mary Tyler Moore Show; Sanford and Son; The Sonny & Cher Comedy Hour
Best Performance in a Television Series Drama
Actor	Actress
James Stewart – Hawkins as Billy Jim Hawkins: David Carradine – Kung Fu as Kwai Chang Caine; Mike Connors – Mannix as Joe Mannix; Peter Falk – Columbo as Lt. Columbo; Richard Thomas – The Waltons as John-Boy Walton; Robert Young – Marcus Welby, M.D. as Dr. Marcus Welby	Lee Remick – The Blue Knight as Cassie Walters: Michael Learned – The Waltons as Olivia Walton; Julie London – Emergency! as Nurse Dixie McCall; Emily McLaughlin – General Hospital as Nurse Jessie Brewer; Susan Saint James – McMillan & Wife as Sally McMillan
Best Performance in a Television Series – Musical or Comedy
Actor	Actress
Jack Klugman – The Odd Couple as Oscar Madison: Alan Alda – M*A*S*H as Benjamin Franklin "Hawkeye" Pierce; Dom DeLuise – Lotsa Luck as Stanley Belmont; Redd Foxx – Sanford and Son as Fred G. Sanford; Carroll O'Connor – All in the Family as Archie Bunker	Cher – The Sonny & Cher Comedy Hour as Various Characters (TIE) Jean Stapleton – All in the Family as Edith Bunker (TIE): Bea Arthur – Maude as Maude Findlay; Carol Burnett – The Carol Burnett Show as Various Characters; Mary Tyler Moore – The Mary Tyler Moore Show as Mary Richards
Best Supporting Performance in a Series, Miniseries or Television Film
Supporting Actor	Supporting Actress
McLean Stevenson – M*A*S*H as Lt. Col. Henry Braymore Blake, M.D.: Ed Asner – The Mary Tyler Moore Show as Lou Grant; Will Geer – The Waltons as Zebulon Walton; Harvey Korman – The Carol Burnett Show as Various Characters; Strother Martin – Hawkins as R.J. Hawkins; Rob Reiner – All in the Family as Michael Stivic	Ellen Corby – The Waltons as Esther Walton: Gail Fisher – Mannix as Peggy Fair; Valerie Harper – The Mary Tyler Moore Show as Rhoda Morgenstern; Sally Struthers – All in the Family as Gloria Stivic; Loretta Swit – M*A*S*H as Maj. Margaret "Hot Lips" Houlihan

The following programs received multiple nominations:

Nominations	Title
5	All in the Family
5	The Waltons
4	The Mary Tyler Moore Show
3	The Carol Burnett Show
3	Hawkins
3	Mannix
3	M*A*S*H
2	Columbo
2	Sanford and Son
2	The Sonny & Cher Comedy Hour

The following programs received multiple wins:

Wins	Title
2	All in the Family
2	The Waltons

=== Cecil B. DeMille Award ===
Bette Davis
