= Edith's Crisis of Faith =

Two-part episode of All in the Family

"Edith's Crisis of Faith" is a two-part episode of the American television sitcom All in the Family. It aired as the 13th and 14th episodes of season 8, on December 18 and 25 in 1977.

== Production ==
The episode includes the third and final appearance of Beverly LaSalle (played by Lori Shannon), after "Archie the Hero" (in which Archie Bunker saves her life) and “Beverly Rides Again” (in which she invites the Bunkers out to dinner).

== Plot ==
Beverly LaSalle, a transvestite and friend of Edith Bunker, is attacked with Mike Stivic a few days before Christmas in an incident of gay bashing. Mike survives the ordeal with only minor injuries, but Beverly is killed. Edith has a crisis of faith and begins to wonder how God would allow people to punish one of His children. She believes that all people are worthy of love and feels a sense of loss and sadness at the tragic event, and doesn't understand it.

== Critical reception and analysis ==
Michael Abernathy of PopMatters wrote that this episode highlighted the "social stigma against trans persons, an act of injustice emphasized by Edith's inability to understand humanity's rejection of people like her dear friend." NewNowNext said in 2016 that the storyline was groundbreaking for 1975 and even by then-current standards. The Queer Encyclopedia of Film and Television described the episode as "daring and disturbing". DVDTalk noted that while Edith says that while Beverly was killed because of "who she was", the episode is coy about specifying what that is. The Age of Netflix argued that by choosing to air both parts of the episode on Christmas night 1977, the episode " massively recalibrates the episode's affective stakes" by forcing viewers to associate the holiday with a time to "(mourn) queer loss".
