= Maude (All in the Family episode) =

- All in the Family episode
- Episode no.: Season 2 Episode 24
- Directed by: John Rich
- Written by: Rod Parker
- Editing by: Marco Zappia
- Production code: 224
- Original air date: March 11, 1972
- Running time: 24 minutes

Guest appearances
- Beatrice Arthur as Maude Findlay; Bill Macy as Walter Findlay; Marcia Rodd as Carol Traynor; Robert Dishy as David Green; Bernie West as The Repairman

Episode chronology
← Previous "Archie is Jealous"	Next → "Archie and the Editorial"

"Maude" is the twenty-fourth and final episode of the second season of the American television sitcom All in the Family; the episode also served as the eponymous pilot episode of its first spin-off series, Maude. The episode, directed by John Rich and written by Rod Parker, was videotaped on February 22, 1972, in front of a live audience at CBS Television City in Hollywood, California, and aired on March 11, 1972, at 8:00 p.m. EST on CBS.

== Plot ==
Archie and Edith Bunker (Carroll O'Connor and Jean Stapleton) travel out of town one weekend to Tuckahoe, New York to attend the wedding of Carol Traynor (Marcia Rodd), the divorced daughter of Edith's favorite cousin, Maude Findlay (Beatrice Arthur). Carol, Archie and Maude are all mutually dreading the wedding for different reasons: Archie and Maude because they both hate each other, and Carol because she predicts that Archie will make bigoted comments about her Jewish fiancé, David Green (Robert Dishy). Maude assures Carol that David will handle Archie with grace, as it is "a trait of theirs", and Carol points out her mother's own shortsighted views on Jewish people. She grumbles about the "archaic ritual" of marriage, but Maude points out that weddings come with gifts.

After Maude gets rid of unhelpful dishwasher repairman Marvin (Bernie West), and pays him only $2 of his $15 fee, David stops by with information about the bachelor party. Maude's fourth husband Walter (Bill Macy), Carol's stepfather, questions her traditional "white" wedding, as she was married once before and already has a "dumb kid" named Phillip. Archie and Edith arrive, and Maude bluntly tells Archie about David, to which Archie reacts just as Carol predicted. When he learns that he must chip in $10 for the bachelor party, Archie refuses to attend and declares his intentions to stay with Edith at the bridal shower, but the arrival of the other female guests drives him back to his motel.

After the bridal shower, Maude and Carol discuss their previous marriages, and debate who gave whom a shower for which event, while Edith goes upstairs to get Phillip a drink and tell him a bedtime story. David and Walter both return home in bad moods as the bachelor party was broken up by the cops for being too rowdy. Carol is upset to learn that there was female entertainment at the party, and is further alarmed when David reveals that he bought a house without Carol's knowledge and expects her to quit her job and be a stay-at-home mother and housewife. She inadvertently makes an anti-Semitic remark in response, and though Maude futilely attempts to smooth things over by praising Jewish men, Carol and David argue and call off the wedding. Maude comforts Carol and breaks the news to Edith and Archie, and Archie (who returns to Maude's house from his motel) reveals that he was the one who (unknowingly) called the cops on David's bachelor party, leading Maude to blame him for the entire debacle and subsequently stomp on his foot. Carol assures him that it was not his fault, and he agrees with this and departs with Edith, leaving their wedding gift with Maude as "a deposit for the next one."

== Production notes ==
- In 1971, Bea Arthur received a telephone call from Norman Lear about guest-starring on a few episodes of All in the Family as Edith's cousin Maude, an outspoken liberal feminist who was the antithesis to the bigoted, conservative Republican Archie, who described her as a "New Deal fanatic". Lear strongly insisted her on doing it, despite Arthur, who hated flying. She agreed at the very last minute to take the role for a few episodes.
- The character of Maude Findlay was introduced on All in the Family on December 11, 1971, in the episode "Cousin Maude's Visit" in which she helped Edith take care of Archie, Mike and Gloria when they came down with the flu. Maude hated Archie (and vice versa), mainly because she thought Edith could have married better, but also because Archie was a bigoted conservative while Maude was very liberal in her politics, especially when Archie denounced Maude's support of Franklin D. Roosevelt.
- Following her first appearance as Maude, Arthur appealed to viewers and to CBS executives, who, she would later recall, asked: "Who is that girl? Let's give her her own series."
- The pilot episode was essentially designed to set up the premise for the spin-off series that would premiere later in the year. In the episode, Bill Macy played Maude's fourth husband, Walter; it was a role he reprised for the weekly series that fall. Marcia Rodd, the actress who played Carol in the pilot episode, was replaced by Adrienne Barbeau in Maude. Rodd would make an appearance on the actual show in the Season 6 episode, "Walter's Temptation"
- Frances Lear, then-wife of Norman Lear, was believed to be the inspiration for the character of Maude Findlay.
