= Edith's 50th Birthday =

- All in the Family episodes
- Episode nos.: Season 8 Episodes 4/5
- Directed by: Paul Bogart
- Written by: Bob Schiller; Bob Weiskopf
- Production code: 805, 807
- Original air date: October 16, 1977

Guest appearances
- David Dukes as Lambert; Jane Connell as Sybil Gooley; John Brandon and Ray Colella as Police Detectives

Episode chronology
← Previous "Cousin Liz"	Next → "Unequal Partners"

"Edith's 50th Birthday" (Parts 1 & 2) are the fourth and fifth episodes of the eighth season of the American television sitcom All in the Family. The episodes, which originally aired as a two-part one hour story on CBS on October 16, 1977, were written by Bob Schiller and Bob Weiskopf, and directed by Paul Bogart.

The episodes depict a man (David Dukes) who, while posing as a police detective, attempts to rape the Bunker family matriarch, Edith (Jean Stapleton), on her 50th birthday. This all happens while her family, unaware of what is happening in the Bunkers' living room, prepares for a surprise party next door (at the home of Gloria, Edith's daughter) to honor Edith. The scenes following the assault depict Edith struggling to deal with the aftermath, and her family's attempts to both comfort her and help bring her assailant to justice.

The episodes, the 161st and 162nd of the series, were the first on an American sitcom that portrayed an attempted rape.

== Plot ==
In Part 1, Edith's family plans a surprise party for her 50th birthday (though she, in fact, knows about the party and is in the process of baking her own birthday cake). As she waits alone in the house, a young man appears at the door, identifying himself as "Detective Lambert", and says he is searching for a rapist. He soon reveals that he is the rapist and starts to sexually assault Edith. His attempts to initiate the assault are interrupted by Edith's rambling, and then a phone call from a family friend, but he refuses Edith's further attempts to thwart him. Archie comes over to claim a punch bowl, and the man takes his clothes, hides in the closet and threatens to kill both Archie and Edith if she says anything. Archie enters grumbling about a mishap that occurred at the Stivic house involving their punchbowl and pet goldfish, claims the punch bowl, and while he does notice Edith is visibly upset, he scoffs at it, thinking she's just getting emotional about the dead goldfish, and he storms out.

Once they are alone, the man begins tearing at Edith's clothes, but Edith buys time by saying she smells something burning in the kitchen. Edith's cake is, in fact, burning in the oven, and the man allows her to pull it out. When he tells her to get rid of it, Edith suddenly stuffs the burnt cake into his face, then shoves him out the back door, and frantically runs through the living room out the front door and over to Gloria and Michael's house, where the party is supposed to take place. As Edith's family and friends yell "Surprise!", she collapses in sobs into Archie's arms, causing Archie to realize something is wrong.

In Part 2, Edith confides to her family what happened, and they are all outraged. Mike and Gloria want Edith to go to the police, but Edith refuses, wanting only to forget it ever happened, while Archie fears the man will try to smear her in court to make it seem like Edith was coming on to him instead; he recalls how they didn't press charges against the man who attacked Gloria years earlier for that exact reason. (Note: As depicted in the third season episode "Gloria the Victim".) With Mike, Archie goes back home to search the house to see if the rapist is still there, but all they find are some of the man's discarded clothes he left in the closet. Edith and Gloria return soon after, followed by the police, who reveal they might've picked the man up. They ask Edith to make a statement and identify the clothes, but she fearfully refuses.

Over the next two weeks, Edith descends into a state of constant fear and depression, constantly ironing sheets and panicking anytime anyone comes to the door; Archie's attempts to be caring and supportive are of little help. Gloria then reveals that the man was subsequently released and attacked another woman, but then was picked up by the police a second time. She urges Edith to go to the police station and identify the man, to prevent him from assaulting any other women. When Edith still refuses, Gloria calls her out on how hypocritical she's being, and when she declares that Edith is no longer her mother, Edith slaps her face. The shock of what she has just done snaps Edith out of her depression, and after apologizing to Gloria, she finally agrees that she needs to identify her attacker to the police. She leaves for the police station with Archie, hoping that her actions will put the rapist away for good.

== Production ==
"Edith's 50th Birthday" originally aired as a one-hour episode. In syndication, it is aired as a two-part episode.

Norman Lear consulted with Gail Abarbanel, the founder and director of the Rape Treatment Center at Santa Monica Hospital, and hosted advance screenings for police and hospitals across the country.

It was originally suggested that this storyline be written so that Ann Romano (portrayed by Bonnie Franklin) would be the one attacked on an episode of One Day at a Time. However, Lear changed it to Edith Bunker because he wanted to make a statement that this could happen to anyone, even someone as simple and naive as Edith.

The episode mentions events from the third season's "Gloria The Victim", in which Gloria was almost raped while walking home from work. In that episode, Edith relates an incident where she herself had been the victim of an attempted date rape as a teenager in the 1940s, during a double date visit to Rockaway Beach, but due to the social norms of the time she had not pressed charges. Gloria also corrects Archie's misconception that she was "over" her ordeal, stating that four years later she still refuses to walk by the area where she was attacked.

== Response ==
The New York Police Department showed this episode, along with other films, to convey the woman's side of rape. It was also shown at rape crisis centers.

In 1996, TV Guide included this episode as part of its "100 Most Memorable Moments in TV History", ranking it # 64.

The scene where Edith uses the burnt cake to attack the rapist and then escape prompted the loudest cheers and applause from the studio audience in the history of the entire series. According to an interview in the E! True Hollywood Story, which covered All in the Family, David Dukes maintained that he received persistent death threats from some viewers for years for his character.
