= List of All in the Family episodes =

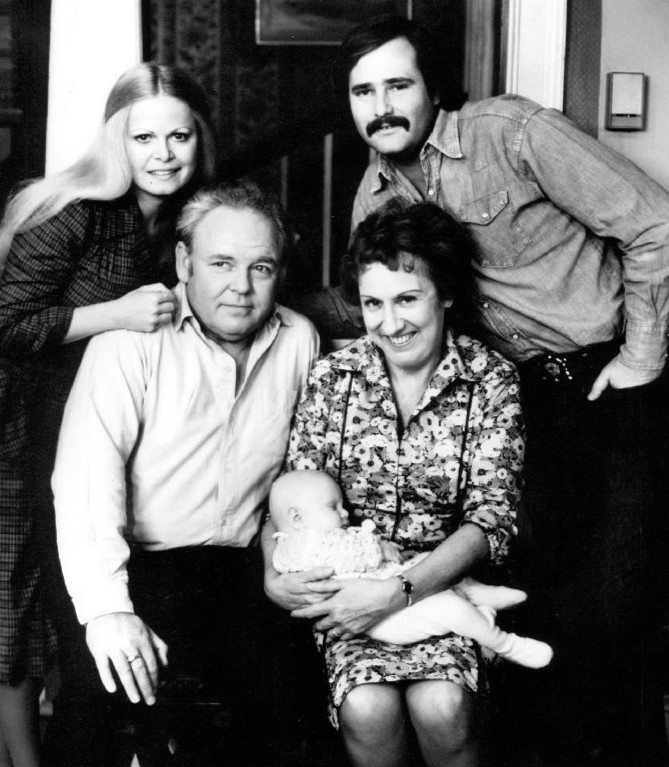
The Bunkers & the Stivics: standing, Gloria (Sally Struthers) and Michael (Rob Reiner); seated, Archie (Carroll O'Connor) and Edith (Jean Stapleton) with baby Joey

The following is an episode list for the American sitcom television series All in the Family, which originally aired for nine seasons on CBS, from January 12, 1971 to April 8, 1979, with a total of 205 episodes produced.

== Series overview ==
Season	Episodes	Originally released		Rank	Rating
Season	Episodes	First released	Last released	Rank	Rating
Pilots	2	1968	1969	—N/a	—N/a
1	13	January 12, 1971	April 6, 1971	34	18.9
2	24	September 18, 1971	March 11, 1972	1	34.0
3	24	September 16, 1972	March 24, 1973	1	33.3
4	24	September 15, 1973	March 16, 1974	1	31.2
5	23	September 14, 1974	March 8, 1975	1	30.2
6	24	September 8, 1975	March 8, 1976	1	30.1
7	25	September 22, 1976	March 12, 1977	12	22.9
8	24	October 2, 1977	March 19, 1978	4	24.4 (Note: Tied with 60 Minutes and Charlie's Angels)
9	24	September 24, 1978	April 8, 1979	9	24.9 (Note: Tied with Taxi)

== Episodes ==
=== Pilot episodes ===
Title	Directed by	Written by	Original release date
"Justice for All"	Norman Lear	Norman Lear	1968
Carroll O'Connor as Archie Justice, Jean Stapleton as Edith Justice, Kelly Jean Peters as Gloria, Tim McIntire as Richard, D'Urville Martin as Lionel
"Those Were the Days"	Norman Lear & Bud Yorkin	Norman Lear	1969
Carroll O'Connor as Archie Justice, Jean Stapleton as Edith Justice, Candy Azzara as Gloria, Chip Oliver as Richard, D'Urville Martin as Lionel

=== Season 1 (1971) ===
No. overall	No. in season	Title	Directed by	Written by	Original release date
1	1	"Meet the Bunkers"	John Rich	Norman Lear	January 12, 1971
Archie and Edith (Carroll O'Connor and Jean Stapleton) come home from church early, interrupting Mike and Gloria's (Rob Reiner and Sally Struthers) privacy.
2	2	"Writing the President"	John Rich	S : Lee Erwin, Fred Freiberger; T : Paul Harrison, Lennie Weinrib, Norman Lear	January 19, 1971
Because Mike wrote a critical letter to President Nixon about the current state of the U.S., Archie decides to write one of his own that praises him.
3	3	"Oh, My Aching Back" "Archie's Aching Back"	John Rich	Stanley Ralph Ross	January 26, 1971
Archie hurts his back in an accident while in his cab, so he tries to find a Jewish lawyer in order to collect in a lawsuit.
4	4	"Archie Gives Blood"	John Rich	Norman Lear	February 2, 1971
Archie questions who might receive some of his blood at a blood bank, thinking that different races have different blood.
5	5	"Judging Books by Covers"	John Rich	Burt Styler and Norman Lear	February 9, 1971
Archie learns about judging people after incorrectly declaring Roger (Anthony Geary) a seemingly effeminate friend of Mike and Gloria to be gay—only to discover that one of his old football buddies Steve (Phil Carey) is gay himself.
6	6	"Gloria's Pregnancy" "Gloria Has a Belly Full"	John Rich	Jerry Mayer	February 16, 1971
The Stivics start apartment hunting after Gloria reveals that she is pregnant, making Archie furious. Although he eventually comes around, Gloria has a miscarriage, and he comforts her.
7	7	"Mike's Hippie Friends Come to Visit" "Now That You Know the Way, Let's Be Strangers"	John Rich	T : Don Nicholl, Bryan Joseph; S/T : Philip Mishkin, Rob Reiner	February 23, 1971
Mike's friends—an unmarried couple—plan to share a sleeping bag in the Bunker home, over Archie's objections.
8	8	"Lionel Moves Into the Neighborhood"	John Rich	Don Nicholl & Bryan Joseph	March 2, 1971
Archie is not happy that a black family is moving into the neighborhood.
9	9	"Edith Has Jury Duty"	John Rich	T : Don Nicholl, Bryan Joseph; S/T : Susan Harris	March 9, 1971
Edith goes on jury duty for a murder trial, and she alone thinks that the accused is not guilty. Archie is upset that Edith is not at home to take care of him.
10	10	"Archie Is Worried About His Job"	John Rich	S : William Bickley, Jr.; T : Norman Lear, Don Nicholl, Bryan Joseph	March 16, 1971
Archie spends the night worrying about his job when his company announces layoffs.: Recording date: March 2, 1971
11	11	"Gloria Discovers Women's Lib"	John Rich	Norman Lear and Sandy Stern	March 23, 1971
As a supporter of women's lib, Gloria accuses Mike of chauvinism and storms out of the house. She comes back, and they make up.
12	12	"Success Story"	John Rich	Burt Styler	March 30, 1971
Archie is visited by an old Army buddy, Eddie Frazier (William Windom), who is now a wealthy car dealer. Mike, who openly resents Eddie's wealth, secretly learns that Eddie is not as successful in one area of his life as he is in business.
13	13	"The First and Last Supper"	John Rich	Jerry Mayer	April 6, 1971
Just as Archie is campaigning to keep black families out of the neighborhood, Edith accepts a dinner invitation from the Jeffersons.

=== Season 2 (1971–72) ===
No. overall	No. in season	Title	Directed by	Written by	Original release date
14	1	"The Saga of Cousin Oscar"	John Rich	T : Norman Lear; S/T : Burt Styler	September 18, 1971
Archie's freeloading cousin Oscar unexpectedly dies during a two-week visit and none of Archie's relatives are willing to help with funeral expenses. Mike and Archie are then left to decide whether to give Oscar a proper funeral or have him buried in a potter's field.
15	2	"Gloria Poses in the Nude"	John Rich	Michael Ross & Bernie West and Norman Lear	September 25, 1971
Archie and Mike have a difference of opinion over Mike's artist friend Szabo Daborba (David Soul) offering to paint Gloria in the nude.
16	3	"Archie in the Lock-up"	John Rich	T : Michael Ross, Bernie West; S/T : Paul Wayne	October 2, 1971
Archie ends up in jail when he tries to save Mike and Lionel from trouble at a demonstration. Tim Reid appears in an uncredited role as Archie's cellmate.
17	4	"Edith Writes a Song"	John Rich	Lee Kalcheim	October 9, 1971
Edith wants to spend money in the Bunker family cash pot to enter a songwriting contest, but Archie would rather use the money to buy a gun due to a recent series of burglaries in the neighborhood. The family later has an encounter with two black crooks, Coke (Cleavon Little) and Horace (Demond Wilson).
18	5	"Flashback: Mike Meets Archie"	John Rich	Philip Mishkin & Rob Reiner	October 16, 1971
Flashbacks show the first tempestuous meeting between Archie and Mike.
19	6	"The Election Story"	John Rich	Michael Ross & Bernie West	October 30, 1971
Archie intends to vote in the local elections just for his candidate to beat Mike and Gloria's.
20	7	"Edith's Accident"	John Rich	S : Tom & Helen August; T : Michael Ross, Bernie West	November 6, 1971
While shopping at Ferguson's Market, Edith has an accident with a car (involving a shopping cart full of canned cling peaches in heavy syrup) and leaves a note for the owner, a Catholic priest (Barnard Hughes), which does not sit well for Archie on both counts.
21	8	"The Blockbuster"	John Rich	T : Michael Ross, Bernie West, Austin & Irma Kalish; S/T : Austin & Irma Kalish	November 13, 1971
A black realtor (Thalmus Rasulala, credited under his former name, Jack Crowder) offers Archie $35,000 to sell the house. Lionel refers to him as an Oreo cookie, "black on the outside and white on the inside."
22	9	"Mike's Problem"	John Rich	T : Philip Mishkin; S/T : Alan J. Levitt	November 20, 1971
Mike has become impotent due to anxiety over his final exams, so he goes to Archie for advice.
23	10	"The Insurance Is Canceled"	John Rich	Lee Kalcheim	November 27, 1971
As if it were not bad enough that the Bunkers' home insurance has been canceled, Archie has to decide which of three men at work must be fired.
24	11	"The Man in the Street"	John Rich	T : Don Nicholl; S/T : Paul Harrison, Lennie Weinrib	December 4, 1971
The Bunkers' TV set breaks down just as Archie is preparing to see his "man in the street" interview about his political beliefs.
25	12	"Cousin Maude's Visit"	John Rich	T : Michael Ross, Bernie West; S/T : Philip Mishkin	December 11, 1971
When all but Edith come down with the flu, her favorite (and extremely liberal) cousin Maude Findlay (Beatrice Arthur) comes to the house to help, and immediately clashes with Archie. In 2009, TV Guide ranked this episode #9 on its list of the 100 Greatest Episodes.
26	13	"Christmas Day at the Bunkers'"	John Rich	Don Nicholl	December 18, 1971
Archie is not in the holiday spirit on Christmas Day due to a mistake at work that cost him his annual Christmas bonus.
27	14	"The Elevator Story"	John Rich	Alan J. Levitt	January 1, 1972
Archie gets stuck in an elevator with a dignified black lawyer (Roscoe Lee Browne), a ditzy secretary (Eileen Brennan), a Puerto Rican janitor (Hector Elizondo), and his very pregnant wife (Edith Díaz). When the janitor's wife goes into labor, everybody must help her to deliver the baby. NOTE: Edith Díaz later guest stars in the season four premiere episode "We're Having a Heat Wave" as one half of a Puerto Rican couple looking to buy the house next door to the Bunkers, much to Archie's displeasure.
28	15	"Edith's Problem"	John Rich	S : Steve Zacharias; S/T : Burt Styler	January 8, 1972 (Note: "Edith's Problem" (#28) won an Emmy for Outstanding Writing (Comedy).)
Edith begins menopause, making it hard for Archie to be understanding.
29	16	"Archie and the FBI"	John Rich	Michael Ross & Bernie West and Susan Harris	January 15, 1972
Archie believes his coworker and neighbor Larry Grundy (Graham Jarvis) is guilty of something after an FBI agent (Jon Korkes) drops by asking questions about him.
30	17	"Mike's Mysterious Son"	John Rich	Warren S. Murray	January 22, 1972
An ex-girlfriend of Mike's, Marilyn Sanders (Marcia Rodd), drops by one night and leaves her four-year-old son Danny (Stephen Manley) with the Bunkers, claiming that Mike is Danny's father. NOTE: Marcia Rodd later guest stars in the season two finale episode "Maude" as Carol Traynor, Maude Findlay's daughter.
31	18	"Archie Sees a Mugging"	John Rich	S : Henry Garson; T : Philip Mishkin, Don Nicholl	January 29, 1972
Archie witnesses a mugging and gets himself in trouble with the victim, the police and the mob. Guest Stars: Jack Somack as Tony Vicino, Frank Campanella as Det. Sgt. Perkins, Val Bisoglio as Ralph Silvestri and Bill Macy as Uniformed Policeman.
32	19	"Archie and Edith, Alone"	John Rich	S : Tina & Les Pine; T : Lee Kalcheim, Michael Ross, Bernie West	February 5, 1972
With Mike and Gloria out of the house for the weekend, an argument between Archie and Edith leads to Edith giving Archie the cold shoulder.
33	20	"Edith Gets a Mink"	John Rich	T : Don Nicholl; S/T : David Pollock, Elias Davis	February 12, 1972
Archie is angry with Edith for accepting a mink cape as a gift from her rich cousin Amelia, then has a change of heart when the cape gets ruined at Jefferson Cleaners after it accidentally gets stained with spaghetti.
34	21	"Sammy's Visit"	John Rich	Bill Dana	February 19, 1972 (Note: "Sammy's Visit" (#34) won an Emmy for Outstanding Direction; nominee for Outstanding Single Program – Drama or Comedy.)
The Bunkers have the honor of Sammy Davis Jr. visiting their home to retrieve a briefcase he accidentally left in Archie's cab. In 1997, TV Guide ranked this episode #13 on its list of the 100 Greatest Episodes.
35	22	"Edith the Judge"	John Rich	Lee Kalcheim	February 26, 1972
The owner of a local laundromat accuses Archie of breaking one of his washing machines by overloading it and it's up to Edith to resolve the issue.
36	23	"Archie Is Jealous"	John Rich	Rod Parker	March 4, 1972
Archie is furious that Mike and Gloria spent a weekend together before they were married, but that's nothing compared to what Edith tells him.
37	24	"Maude"	John Rich	Rod Parker	March 11, 1972
Carol Traynor (Marcia Rodd), the divorced daughter of Edith's favorite cousin Maude Findlay (Beatrice Arthur) is about to enter a mixed marriage with her Jewish fiancé, David Green (Bob Dishy), and Archie and Edith travel upstate to Tuckahoe to attend. This episode serves as the backdoor pilot for the spin-off series Maude.

=== Season 3 (1972–73) ===
No. overall	No. in season	Title	Directed by	Written by	Original release date
38	1	"Archie and the Editorial"	Norman Campbell	T : Don Nicholl; S/T : George Bloom	September 16, 1972
Archie goes on television to protest an editorial in favor of gun control, then faces the consequences for opening his big mouth.
39	2	"Archie's Fraud"	Norman Campbell	Michael Ross & Bernie West	September 23, 1972
Archie tries to get out of paying the IRS for moonlighting as a graveyard-shift cabbie for his friend Burt Munson (Billy Halop).
40	3	"The Threat"	John Rich	S : Bill Manhoff; S/T : Lila Garrett, Michael Elias	September 30, 1972
Archie says his friend's wife (Gloria LeRoy) flirted with him during an overnight visit.
41	4	"Gloria and the Riddle"	Bob La Hendro and Robert H. Livingston	Don Nicholl	October 7, 1972
Gloria presents a riddle to prove Archie and Mike's chauvinism, sparking a debate about women's liberation. Edith eventually provides the answer.
42	5	"Lionel Steps Out"	John Rich	S : Terry Ryan; S/T : Michael Ross, Bernie West	October 14, 1972
Archie is furious when his visiting niece Linda (Dianne Hull) goes out with Lionel.
43	6	"Edith Flips Her Wig"	Hal Cooper	Sam Locke & Olga Vallance and Don Nicholl	October 21, 1972
When Edith gets arrested for shoplifting, she thinks she inherited her aunt's kleptomania.
44	7	"The Bunkers and the Swingers"	John Rich and Bob LaHendro	S : Norman Lear; T : Michael Ross, Bernie West, Lee Kalcheim	October 28, 1972 (Note: "The Bunkers and the Swingers" (#44) won an Emmy for Outstanding Writing for a Comedy Series; nomination for Outstanding Direction (Comedy).)
Edith unwittingly answers an ad placed by a couple interested in wife-swapping (Vincent Gardenia and Rue McClanahan), and their visit to the Bunkers leads to confusion. NOTE: Vincent Gardenia later becomes a semi-regular cast member in season four.
45	8	"Mike Comes Into Money"	John Rich	Michael Ross & Bernie West	November 4, 1972
Archie gets upset when Mike donates $275 he recently inherited from his late uncle Alex towards George McGovern's presidential campaign instead of contributing towards his room and board.
46	9	"Flashback: Mike and Gloria's Wedding – Part 1"	John Rich and Bob LaHendro	Rob Reiner & Philip Mishkin	November 11, 1972
Flashbacks show the wedding of Mike and Gloria where Archie argues with Mike's Polish uncle Casimir (Michael Conrad) over how the ceremony should go.
47	10	"Flashback: Mike and Gloria's Wedding – Part 2"	John Rich and Bob LaHendro	Rob Reiner & Philip Mishkin	November 18, 1972
More flashbacks show the wedding of Mike and Gloria as an argument occurs over who should conduct the ceremony.
48	11	"Mike's Appendix"	John Rich and Bob LaHendro	Michael Ross & Bernie West	December 2, 1972
Mike has to choose between two doctors for a much-needed appendectomy, one of whom is a woman.
49	12	"Edith's Winning Ticket"	John Rich and Bob LaHendro	Don Nicholl	December 9, 1972
Archie is delighted that Edith has a winning lottery ticket, but is disappointed when she claims it belongs to Louise Jefferson.
50	13	"Archie and the Bowling Team"	John Rich and Bob LaHendro	S : Don Nicholl; T : Allan Katz, Don Reo	December 16, 1972
Archie competes with a black man for a position on his district's bowling team.
51	14	"The Locket"	Hal Cooper	Robert Fisher & Arthur Marx	December 23, 1972
When an antique locket given to Edith by her grandmother goes missing, Archie plans an insurance scheme.
52	15	"Archie in the Hospital"	John Rich and Bob LaHendro	S : Stanley Ralph Ross, Martin Cohan; T : Don Nicholl	January 6, 1973
Archie goes to the hospital for back pain and makes friends with a patient on the other side of the curtain in his room, who, unbeknownst to him, is black.
53	16	"Oh Say Can You See"	John Rich and Bob LaHendro	S : Jess Oppenheimer (credited as Joe Kerr); T : Michael Ross, Bernie West	January 20, 1973
Archie starts worrying about his age when he sees an old high school friend who looks 15 years younger.
54	17	"Archie Goes Too Far"	John Rich and Bob LaHendro	Austin & Irma Kalish	January 27, 1973
While looking for a magazine, Archie finds a poem that Mike wrote to someone other than Gloria, bringing up the issue of invading one's privacy.
55	18	"Class Reunion"	John Rich and Bob LaHendro	S : Stanley Ralph Ross; S/T : Don Nicholl	February 10, 1973
Archie accompanies Edith to her high school reunion when he learns her old boyfriend will be there. Guest Stars: Priscilla Morrill as Sara, Harvey Lembeck as Sam, Rae Allen as Amelia, Bernie Hamilton as Walter, Viola Harris as Arlene, Joshua Shelley as Willie, Evelyn King as Mavis and Bernie Kuby as Buck.
56	19	"Hot Watch"	John Rich and Bob LaHendro	Sam Locke & Olga Vallance	February 17, 1973
Archie buys a $300 watch for just $25, but Mike suspects the watch could have been stolen, making Archie an accomplice in a crime.
57	20	"Archie Is Branded"	John Rich and Bob LaHendro	Vincent Bogert	February 24, 1973
Archie discovers a swastika painted on his front door one Sunday and dismisses it as a prank, but Mike believes it's something far more serious. NOTE: Jean Stapleton's son, John Putch, appears in a small role as a Boy Scout.
58	21	"Everybody Tells the Truth"	John Rich and Bob LaHendro	Don Nicholl	March 3, 1973
While dining out, Archie and Mike have opposing (and exaggerated) accounts of the events of earlier that evening, involving Archie and the repairmen who came to repair the refrigerator.
59	22	"Archie Learns His Lesson"	John Rich and Bob LaHendro	S : John Christopher Strong III, Michael R. Stein; T : Michael Ross, Bernie West	March 10, 1973
Archie attends night school to earn his GED so he'll get a promotion and tries to keep a secret from Mike and Gloria.
60	23	"Gloria the Victim"	John Rich and Bob LaHendro	Austin & Irma Kalish and Don Nicholl	March 17, 1973
While walking past a construction site on her way home from work one evening, Gloria is a victim of attempted rape and must decide whether or not to press charges against her attacker.
61	24	"The Battle of the Month"	John Rich and Bob LaHendro	Michael Ross & Bernie West	March 24, 1973
Edith and Gloria get into an argument over women's lib, forcing Archie and Mike to deal with the fallout.

=== Season 4 (1973–74) ===
No. overall	No. in season	Title	Directed by	Written by	Original release date
62	1	"We're Having a Heat Wave"	John Rich and Bob LaHendro	Don Nicholl	September 15, 1973
As the Bunkers go through a September heat wave, Archie fumes after finding out that a Puerto Rican couple is planning to buy the house next door. NOTE: Effective this episode, Vincent Gardenia and Betty Garrett become semi-regular cast members.
63	2	"We're Still Having a Heat Wave"	John Rich and Bob LaHendro	Michael Ross and Bernie West	September 22, 1973
As the heat wave continues, Archie continues to be irritated by the Lorenzos—who happen to be Irish (Irene) and Italian (Frank).
64	3	"Edith Finds an Old Man"	John Rich and Bob LaHendro	S : Susan Harris; T : Michael Ross, Bernie West	September 29, 1973
Archie is not happy with Edith allowing a nursing home runaway (Burt Mustin) to stay with them.
65	4	"Archie and the Kiss"	John Rich and Bob LaHendro	John Rappaport	October 6, 1973
Irene gives Gloria a statue of "The Kiss," which Archie finds filthy.
66	5	"Archie the Gambler"	John Rich and Bob LaHendro	S : Steve Zacharias, Michael Leeson; T : Michael Ross, Bernie West	October 13, 1973
Archie arrives home in a good mood and bearing presents for Gloria and Edith. But when Edith learns he has been betting on the horses, she becomes furious, as Archie once had a compulsive gambling problem many years earlier.
67	6	"Henry's Farewell"	John Rich and Bob LaHendro	Don Nicholl	October 20, 1973
The Bunkers and the Jeffersons have a farewell party for Henry, where Archie incites another argument. NOTE: On May 22, 2019, this episode was remade as a live special for ABC's Live in Front of a Studio Audience. This is the first appearance of Sherman Hemsley as George Jefferson.
68	7	"Archie and the Computer"	John Rich and Bob LaHendro	Lloyd Turner & Gordon Mitchell and Don Nicholl	October 27, 1973
A computer error keeps sending quarters to Edith and another declares Archie dead.
69	8	"The Games Bunkers Play"	John Rich and Bob LaHendro	S : Susan Perkis Haven, Dan Klein; S/T : Michael Ross, Bernie West	November 3, 1973
During a group therapy game, Mike gets offended by the honest opinions about him.
70	9	"Edith's Conversion"	John Rich and Bob LaHendro	Ray Taylor	November 10, 1973
Archie is worried that Edith will convert when she befriends Irene's sister, a Catholic nun.: Recording date: October 2, 1973
71	10	"Archie in the Cellar"	John Rich and Bob LaHendro	Don Nicholl	November 17, 1973
While the rest of the family is away for the weekend, Archie accidentally locks himself in the cellar.: Recording date: October 9, 1973
72	11	"Black is the Color of My True Love's Wig"	John Rich and Bob LaHendro	Michael Morris	November 24, 1973
Gloria buys a black wig to change her look, but she becomes upset when Mike becomes more attracted to her with the wig on.
73	12	"Second Honeymoon"	John Rich and Bob LaHendro	T : Michael Ross, Bernie West; S/T : Warren S. Murray	December 1, 1973
Edith takes a reluctant Archie on a second honeymoon to celebrate their 25th wedding anniversary.
74	13	"The Taxi Caper"	John Rich and Bob LaHendro	Dennis Klein	December 8, 1973
Archie is robbed while moonlighting as a cabbie for his friend Burt Munson, then agrees to drop the charges in return for a payoff, only to get in trouble with the police.
75	14	"Archie is Cursed"	John Rich and Bob LaHendro	John Rappaport and Michael Ross & Bernie West	December 15, 1973
Archie and Irene play a game of pool to settle an argument, then Archie makes a remark that leads to Frank putting a curse on him.
76	15	"Edith's Christmas Story"	John Rich	T : Don Nicholl; S/T : Austin & Irma Kalish	December 22, 1973
At Christmastime, Edith tries to maintain the holiday spirit after discovering a lump in her breast.
77	16	"Mike and Gloria Mix it Up"	John Rich	Michael Ross & Bernie West	January 5, 1974
Mike and Gloria argue over who should be the aggressor in their marriage.
78	17	"Archie Feels Left Out"	John Rich and Bob LaHendro	Paul Lichtman & Howard Storm and Don Nicholl	January 12, 1974
Archie mopes about his age on his 50th birthday.
79	18	"Et Tu, Archie"	John Rich and Bob LaHendro	Mickey Rose & Lila Garrett	January 26, 1974
Archie worries that an old friend whose job he took is planning to get it back.
80	19	"Gloria's Boyfriend"	John Rich	Bud Wiser and Don Nicholl	February 2, 1974
Archie disapproves of Gloria's friendship with George Bushmill (Richard Masur), a mentally challenged box boy at Ferguson's Market. Joseph Mascolo also guest stars as George's father, Pat Bushmill.
81	20	"Lionel's Engagement"	John Rich	Michael Ross and Bernie West	February 9, 1974
Archie comes to Lionel's engagement party over George's objections, and both he and George get a load of Lionel's fiancée's parents, an interracial couple.
82	21	"Archie Eats and Runs"	John Rich	Paul Wayne and George Burditt	February 16, 1974
Archie thinks he has botulism from eating canned mushrooms.
83	22	"Gloria Sings the Blues"	John Rich	Michael Ross and Bernie West	March 2, 1974
Gloria does not think she loves Mike anymore, so Edith tries to help her.
84	23	"Pay the Twenty Dollars"	John Rich	Robert L. Goodwin & Woody Kling	March 9, 1974
George Jefferson (Sherman Hemsley) accuses Archie of giving him a counterfeit $20 bill to pay for his drycleaning.
85	24	"Mike's Graduation"	John Rich	Don Nicholl	March 16, 1974
As Mike prepares for his final exams, Archie is anxious for the Stivics to move out.

=== Season 5 (1974–75) ===
No. overall	No. in season	Title	Directed by	Written by	Original release date
86	1	"The Bunkers and Inflation: Part 1"	H. Wesley Kenney	Don Nicholl and Michael Ross & Bernie West	September 14, 1974
Archie is troubled by the possibility of his union going on strike.
87	2	"The Bunkers and Inflation: Part 2" "Archie Underfoot"	H. Wesley Kenney	Don Nicholl and Michael Ross & Bernie West	September 21, 1974
Archie mopes around the house about going on the picket line for his union.
88	3	"The Bunkers and Inflation: Part 3" "Edith the Job Hunter"	H. Wesley Kenney	Don Nicholl and Michael Ross & Bernie West	September 28, 1974
Since Archie is still on strike, Edith goes looking for a job for the first time in 26 years. Louise offers her work at the Jeffersons' dry-cleaning shop, prompting anger from both Archie and George.
89	4	"The Bunkers and Inflation: Part 4" "Archie's Raise"	H. Wesley Kenney	Don Nicholl and Michael Ross & Bernie West	October 5, 1974
Archie is upset that he is the only one in his family not earning any money. Guest Star: James Cromwell as Stretch Cunningham
90	5	"Lionel the Live-In"	H. Wesley Kenney	S : Jeffery Mackowsky; T : Woody Kling	October 12, 1974
Lionel stays with the Bunkers after an argument with his father and Archie is anxious for him to leave.
91	6	"Archie's Helping Hand"	H. Wesley Kenney	Norman & Harriet Belkin	October 19, 1974
Archie gets Irene a job at the factory to get her away from Edith, but his plan backfires when she proves an incredible worker.
92	7	"Gloria's Shock"	H. Wesley Kenney	Dixie Brown Grossman	October 26, 1974
Gloria is shocked that Mike does not want any children since they never discussed it.
93	8	"Where's Archie?"	H. Wesley Kenney	Barry Harman & Harve Brosten	November 2, 1974
Edith and Gloria start to panic when Archie fails to call from a weekend convention. NOTE: Due to a contract dispute, Carroll O'Connor does not appear in this episode.
94	9	"Archie is Missing"	H. Wesley Kenney	Lloyd Turner & Gordon Mitchell	November 9, 1974
Mike and Gloria believe Archie ran off with an attractive secretary. Guest Star: James Cromwell as Stretch Cunningham NOTE: Carroll O'Connor does not appear in this episode due to a contract dispute.
95	10	"The Longest Kiss"	H. Wesley Kenney	S : Dawn M. Stephens; S/T : Lou Derman, Bill Davenport	November 16, 1974
Archie is finally found after having been missing for two days. The Bunkers, the Jeffersons, and the Lorenzos throw a party to celebrate.: Recording date: July 30, 1974
96	11	"Archie and the Miracle"	H. Wesley Kenney	Lloyd Turner & Gordon Mitchell	November 23, 1974
A near-death experience convinces Archie that he owes his life to God, which naturally leads to another argument with Mike.: Recording date: November 1, 1974; Guest Star: James Cromwell as Stretch Cunningham
97	12	"George and Archie Make a Deal"	H. Wesley Kenney	David P. Harmon	November 30, 1974
A signature from Archie is required for George Jefferson to run for public office.
98	13	"Archie's Contract"	H. Wesley Kenney	Ron Friedman	December 7, 1974
A salesman talks Archie into having aluminum siding installed, but it turns out to be a scam.
99	14	"Mike's Friend"	H. Wesley Kenney	Roger Shulman & John Baskin	December 14, 1974
Mike leaves Gloria out of an intellectual conversation with his friend. NOTE: Carroll O'Connor does not appear in this episode.
—	—	"The Best of All in the Family"	John Rich and Bob LaHendro & H. Wesley Kenney	Don Nicholl and Michael Ross & Bernie West and Norman Lear	December 21, 1974
Henry Fonda hosts this one-hour special that celebrates the best moments of All in the Family.
100	15	"Prisoner in the House"	H. Wesley Kenney	T : Lou Derman, Bill Davenport; S/T : Bud Wiser	January 4, 1975
Archie is not happy that the plumber's assistant is a Sing-Sing prisoner in a work-furlough program.
101	16	"The Jeffersons Move Up"	H. Wesley Kenney	Don Nicholl and Michael Ross & Bernie West	January 11, 1975
Louise Jefferson (Isabel Sanford) has second thoughts about moving to the East Side of Manhattan. Pilot for The Jeffersons. NOTE: Carroll O'Connor, Rob Reiner, and Sally Struthers do not appear in this episode.
102	17	"All's Fair"	H. Wesley Kenney	Lloyd Turner & Gordon Mitchell	January 18, 1975
Archie is shocked when Edith defies his demands and orders him to show some respect.
103	18	"Amelia's Divorce"	H. Wesley Kenney	Lou Derman & Bill Davenport	January 25, 1975
A surprise visit from Edith's cousin Amelia and her husband reveals some things about their marriage. NOTE: Rob Reiner and Sally Struthers do not appear in this episode.
104	19	"Everybody Does It"	H. Wesley Kenney	Lou Derman & Bill Davenport and Susan Ware	February 8, 1975
The Stivics show Archie the error of his "borrowing" nails and an electric drill from work.
105	20	"Archie and the Quiz"	H. Wesley Kenney	Michael Morris	February 15, 1975
Edith reads a life-expectancy quiz and informs Archie he does not have much longer to live.
106	21	"Edith's Friend"	H. Wesley Kenney	Barry Harman & Harve Brosten	February 22, 1975
Edith reunites with her friend Roy when she goes to a family wedding by herself.
107	22	"No Smoking"	H. Wesley Kenney	Lou Derman & Bill Davenport	March 1, 1975
The cigar-smoking Archie and food-loving Mike make a bet over which of them can go two days without their preferred vice.
108	23	"Mike Makes His Move"	H. Wesley Kenney	S : Robert Arnott; S/T : Lou Derman, Bill Davenport	March 8, 1975
George Jefferson offers to rent the Stivics his house.

=== Season 6 (1975–76) ===
No. overall	No. in season	Title	Directed by	Written by	Original release date
109	1	"The Very Moving Day"	Paul Bogart	Hal Kanter	September 8, 1975
Gloria announces her pregnancy on the very day she and Mike are moving into the Jeffersons' house next door.
110	2	"Alone at Last"	Paul Bogart	Hal Kanter	September 15, 1975
The Stivics are about to move next door, but Mike forgot to turn on the utilities.
111	3	"Archie the Donor"	Paul Bogart	Bill Davenport and Larry Rhine	September 22, 1975
Archie signs up for an organ-donor program to increase his chances at getting a dispatcher's job, only to get upset when he learns that other people may have "his" organs when he dies. NOTE: Sally Struthers does not appear in this episode due to a contract dispute.
112	4	"Archie the Hero"	Paul Bogart	Lou Derman & Bill Davenport	September 29, 1975
While moonlighting as a cabbie for his friend Burt Munson (Billy Halop), Archie performs mouth-to-mouth on an unconscious passenger named Beverly LaSalle (Lori Shannon)—only to discover that Beverly is really a transvestite. NOTE: Sally Struthers does not appear in this episode due to a contract dispute.
113	5	"Mike's Pains"	Paul Bogart	Lou Derman and Milt Josefsberg	October 6, 1975
Mike has second thoughts about being in the delivery room with Gloria.
114	6	"Chain Letter"	Paul Bogart	T : Milt Josefsberg; S/T : Lou Derman	October 20, 1975
Archie throws out a chain letter thinking it's baloney, but bad luck soon befalls him. NOTE: Sally Struthers does not appear in this episode due to a contract dispute.
115	7	"Mike Faces Life"	Paul Bogart	Mel Tolkin and Larry Rhine	October 27, 1975
Gloria loses her job at Kressler's Department Store due to her pregnancy, so she and Mike decide to protest.
116	8	"Edith Breaks Out"	Paul Bogart	Lou Derman & Bill Davenport	November 3, 1975
Edith gets a volunteer job despite Archie's objections. NOTE: Sally Struthers does not appear in this episode due to a contract dispute.
117	9	"Grandpa Blues"	Paul Bogart	S : John Rappaport; T : Mel Tolkin, Larry Rhine	November 10, 1975
Archie has to lower his blood pressure for a physical and it does not help that he is arguing with Mike over the name of the baby.
118	10	"Gloria Suspects Mike"	Paul Bogart	Lou Derman and Milt Josefsberg	November 17, 1975
Gloria suspects Mike of fooling around with a pupil (Bernadette Peters) he is tutoring for extra money.
119	11	"The Little Atheist"	Paul Bogart	Lou Derman	November 24, 1975
At Thanksgiving, Archie and Mike argue over the upbringing of the Stivics' baby.
120	12	"Archie's Civil Rights"	Paul Bogart	Larry Rhine and Mel Tolkin	December 1, 1975
While moonlighting as a cabbie one night for his friend Burt Munson, Archie uses a tear-gas device against a mugger in self-defense, then gets cited for possessing an illegal weapon. NOTE: Rob Reiner does not appear in this episode.
121	13	"Gloria is Nervous"	Paul Bogart	Milt Josefsberg and Ben Starr	December 8, 1975
Gloria is antsy since her baby's nine days overdue, and Mike gets nervous at the baby shower. NOTE: Final appearance of Betty Garrett as Irene Lorenzo. Carroll O'Connor does not appear in this episode.
122	14	"Birth of the Baby: Part 1"	Paul Bogart	Lou Derman & Bill Davenport and Larry Rhine & Mel Tolkin	December 15, 1975
As Archie participates in his lodge's annual minstrel show under duress, Gloria goes into labor while at an Italian restaurant with Mike.
123	15	"Birth of the Baby: Part 2"	Paul Bogart	Milt Josefsberg and Ben Starr	December 22, 1975
The Bunkers and the Stivics each race to the hospital for the birth of Gloria's baby. Mike panics in the delivery room while Edith and Archie eagerly await news in the waiting room.
124	16	"New Year's Wedding"	Paul Bogart	Lou Derman & Bill Davenport and Milt Josefsberg & Ben Starr	January 5, 1976
Mike and Gloria get into an argument just as they're about to participate in their friends' New Year's wedding. NOTE: Carroll O'Connor and Jean Stapleton do not appear in this episode.
125	17	"Archie the Babysitter"	Paul Bogart	Lou Derman & Bill Davenport	January 12, 1976
Archie fires his grandson's babysitter and babysits him himself—even though he is hosting a poker game. NOTE: Jean Stapleton does not appear in this episode.
126	18	"Archie Finds a Friend"	Paul Bogart	Mel Tolkin and Larry Rhine	January 26, 1976
Edith is surprised that Archie's made friends with a Jewish watchmaker, then gets upset when he asks her to invest $1,000 in the watchmaker's new invention. NOTE: Rob Reiner and Sally Struthers do not appear in this episode.
127	19	"Mike's Move"	Paul Bogart	Milt Josefsberg and Ben Starr	February 2, 1976
Mike's liberal thinking is put to the test when he learns he may lose a teaching job to an African-American colleague.
128	20	"Archie's Weighty Problem"	Paul Bogart	Larry Rhine and Mel Tolkin	February 9, 1976
Archie's doctor instructs him to lose weight, but he is not impressed by Edith's attempts to cook healthier meals. He sneaks out to Kelcy's Bar for junk food, prompting arguments.
129	21	"Love By Appointment"	Paul Bogart	Lou Derman & Bill Davenport	February 16, 1976
Now that Gloria's a mother, she is unable to make time for Mike.
130	22	"Joey's Baptism"	Paul Bogart	Milt Josefsberg and Mel Tolkin & Larry Rhine	February 23, 1976
Archie decides to baptize Joey himself after arguing with Mike about it
131	23	"Mike and Gloria's House Guests"	Paul Bogart	Larry Rhine & Mel Tolkin and Milt Josefsberg	March 1, 1976
The Bunkers' furnace breaks down, forcing them to spend a few days with the Stivics.
132	24	"Edith's Night Out"	Paul Bogart	T : Douglas Arango, Phil Doran; S/T : Lou Derman	March 8, 1976
After getting a new red pantsuit, Edith wants Archie to take her out, but he refuses, so she goes out by herself. When Archie sees her as the life of the party at Kelcy's, he realizes he should appreciate her more.

=== Season 7 (1976–77) ===
No. overall	No. in season	Title	Directed by	Written by	Original release date
133	1	"Archie's Brief Encounter: Part 1"	Paul Bogart	Mel Tolkin and Larry Rhine	September 22, 1976
134	2	"Archie's Brief Encounter: Part 2"	Paul Bogart	Mel Tolkin and Larry Rhine	September 22, 1976
Archie has a brief encounter with an attractive waitress.: Recording date: September 3, 1976; NOTE: Rob Reiner and Sally Struthers do not appear in part 1.
135	3	"Archie's Brief Encounter: Part 3"	Paul Bogart	Larry Rhine and Mel Tolkin	September 29, 1976
Mike and Gloria try to get Archie and Edith back together after the business with the waitress.
136	4	"The Unemployment Story: Part 1"	Paul Bogart	Ben Starr & Chuck Stewart	October 6, 1976
Archie loses the job he has had for 30 years just as the family is planning to celebrate Mike's career. First part of a four-part story arc.
137	5	"The Unemployment Story: Part 2"	Paul Bogart	Chuck Stewart & Ben Starr	October 13, 1976
Archie gets a new job, then has to talk the man who lost it to him off the ledge. Second part to a four-part story arc. NOTE: Rob Reiner does not appear in this episode.
138	6	"Archie's Operation: Part 1"	Paul Bogart	S : Calvin Kelly, Jim Tisdale; T : Milt Josefsberg, Mort Lachman	October 20, 1976
Archie is about to undergo a cholecystectomy (gallbladder surgery), and the hospital staff do not make him feel any better about it. Third part of a four-part story arc.
139	7	"Archie's Operation: Part 2"	Paul Bogart	Larry Rhine and Mel Tolkin	October 27, 1976
Just as Archie is complaining about receiving what he considers poor medical care, he gets some good news about his job. Concluding part of a four-part story arc.: Recording date: September 17, 1976; NOTE: Sally Struthers does not appear in this episode.
140	8	"Beverly Rides Again"	Paul Bogart	Phil Doran & Douglas Arango	November 6, 1976
Archie sets his friend Pinky Peterson (Eugene Roche) up with Beverly LaSalle (Lori Shannon) to get even with his practical jokes. NOTE: Rob Reiner and Sally Struthers do not appear in this episode.
141	9	"Teresa Moves In"	Paul Bogart	Michael Loman	November 13, 1976
Teresa Betancourt (Liz Torres), a smart aleck Puerto Rican nurse from the hospital where Archie had his gallbladder surgery, moves into the Bunker household as a boarder to help pay Archie's medical bills. NOTE: Rob Reiner does not appear in this episode.
142	10	"Mike and Gloria's Will"	Paul Bogart	Bill Richmond and Gene Perrett	November 20, 1976
After Mike is almost hit by a subway train, he and Gloria decide to make out a will, but they do not name Archie and Edith as Joey's guardians.
143	11	"Mr. Edith Bunker"	Paul Bogart	Mel Tolkin and Larry Rhine	November 27, 1976
When Edith saves a young man's life while volunteering at the Sunshine Home, she is named a hero and gets a television interview, making Archie jealous NOTE: Rob Reiner does not appear in this episode.
144	12	"Archie's Secret Passion"	Paul Bogart	Michael Loman	December 4, 1976
Archie is worried when a couple of old friends visit, because he once had an affair with the woman. NOTE: Sally Struthers does not appear in this episode.
145	13	"The Baby Contest"	Paul Bogart	S : Marion Zola, Ed Haas; T : Larry Rhine, Mel Tolkin	December 11, 1976
Archie enters Joey's picture in a beautiful baby contest, and tries cheating to ensure that his grandson wins.
146	14	"Gloria's False Alarm"	Paul Bogart	Phil Doran & Douglas Arango	December 18, 1976
A visit to the doctor reveals that Gloria may be pregnant again, leading to an argument with Mike about responsibility. NOTE: Carroll O'Connor does not appear in this episode.: Recording date: November 5, 1976
147	15	"The Draft Dodger"	Paul Bogart	Jay Moriarty and Mike Milligan	December 25, 1976
The Bunkers have Christmas dinner with Archie's friend Pinky Peterson (Eugene Roche), whose son Steven died fighting in the Vietnam War, and an old high school friend of Mike's who is a draft dodger.
148	16	"The Boarder Patrol"	Paul Bogart	Mel Tolkin and Larry Rhine	January 8, 1977
Teresa (Liz Torres) invites her boyfriend Brian (Patrick Cronin) to stay overnight while Archie and Edith travel out of town to visit Edith's aunt Iola. Things get sticky when Archie and Edith return home sooner than expected due to a missed bus and Teresa must find a way to sneak Brian out of the house without being noticed
149	17	"Archie's Chair"	Paul Bogart	Phil Doran & Douglas Arango	January 15, 1977
Mike accidentally breaks Archie's easy chair, which is then lost by a repair shop, making Archie very angry.
150	18	"Mike Goes Skiing"	Paul Bogart	Ben Starr & Chuck Stewart	January 22, 1977
Mike fakes being tired in order to avoid going to a party with Gloria so he can go skiing with his office friends.
151	19	"Stretch Cunningham, Goodbye"	Paul Bogart	Phil Doran and Douglas Arango and Milt Josefsberg	January 29, 1977
Archie is asked to deliver the eulogy at the funeral of his coworker and friend Stretch Cunningham, only to discover that Stretch was Jewish. NOTE: Sally Struthers does not appear in this episode.
152	20	"The Joys of Sex"	Paul Bogart	Erik Tarloff	February 5, 1977
Gloria finds Edith reading a sex manual, so Mike has a talk with Archie on the subject.
153	21	"Mike the Pacifist"	Paul Bogart	Phil Doran & Douglas Arango	February 12, 1977
Mike feels guilty for hitting a subway passenger who was abusing his wife. NOTE: Jean Stapleton does not appear in this episode.
154	22	"Fire"	Paul Bogart	Michael Loman and Larry Rhine and Mel Tolkin	February 19, 1977
Archie vandalizes his own house to increase his insurance claim for a small fire. NOTE: Liz Torres' final appearance as Teresa Betancourt.
155	23	"Mike and Gloria Split"	Paul Bogart	S : Mort Lachman, Milt Josefsberg; T : Mel Tolkin, Larry Rhine	February 26, 1977
Mike is forced to share a bed with Archie after arguing with Gloria over a word game.
156	24	"Archie the Liberal"	Paul Bogart	Ben Starr & Chuck Stewart	March 5, 1977
Archie's lodge makes a token effort to recruit a new member when the press and civil-rights groups criticizes their discrimination. NOTE: Sally Struthers does not appear in this episode.
157	25	"Archie's Dog Day Afternoon"	Paul Bogart	S : Mort Lachman, Milt Josefsberg; T : Chuck Stewart, Ben Starr	March 12, 1977
Archie accidentally backs his car over Barney's dog. NOTE: Sally Struthers does not appear in this episode.

=== Season 8 (1977–78) ===
No. overall	No. in season	Title	Directed by	Written by	Original release date
158	1	"Archie Gets the Business"	Paul Bogart	Larry Rhine and Mel Tolkin	October 2, 1977
159	2	"Archie Gets the Business"	Paul Bogart	Larry Rhine and Mel Tolkin	October 2, 1977
Archie wants to mortgage the house to buy Kelcy's Bar, but Edith is against it. NOTE: The show begins its transformation from the setting of the Bunker home to Archie's bar which will continue into Archie Bunker's Place.
160	3	"Cousin Liz"	Paul Bogart	S : Barry Harman, Harve Brosten; T : Bob Weiskopf, Bob Schiller	October 9, 1977 (Note: "Cousin Liz" (#160) won an Emmy for Outstanding Writing (Comedy).)
Edith's cousin Liz, a schoolteacher, passes away, and Edith and Archie travel out of town to attend her funeral, where Edith learns a shocking secret about her late cousin. NOTE: Rob Reiner and Sally Struthers do not appear in this episode.
161	4	"Edith's 50th Birthday"	Paul Bogart	Bob Weiskopf & Bob Schiller	October 16, 1977 (Note: "Edith's 50th Birthday" (#161) won an Emmy for Outstanding Direction (Comedy).)
162	5	"Edith's 50th Birthday"	Paul Bogart	Bob Weiskopf & Bob Schiller	October 16, 1977
A rapist posing as a police detective (David Dukes), attacks Edith on her 50th birthday. Edith is so traumatized by the attack she refuses to leave the house, or identify the man to bring him to justice.
163	6	"Unequal Partners"	Paul Bogart	Chuck Stewart & Ben Starr	October 23, 1977
Archie tries to rush the wedding ceremony of two rest-home residents so he can go on a fishing trip. NOTE: Rob Reiner and Sally Struthers do not appear in this episode.
164	7	"Archie's Grand Opening"	Paul Bogart	Mel Tolkin and Larry Rhine	October 30, 1977
At the opening of Archie's Place, Mike must replace the bartender at the last minute.
165	8	"Archie's Bitter Pill: Part 1"	Paul Bogart	Mel Tolkin & Larry Rhine and William C. Rader, M.D.	November 6, 1977
Archie takes unprescribed pills to deal with the stress of his waning business.
166	9	"Archie's Bitter Pill: Part 2" "Archie's Road Back"	Paul Bogart	Larry Rhine and Mel Tolkin	November 13, 1977
Archie goes into depression after he stops taking pills.
167	10	"Archie and the KKK: Part 1"	Paul Bogart	Bob Weiskopf & Bob Schiller and Mort Lachman & Milt Josefsberg	November 27, 1977
Archie unknowingly joins a KKK-style group (the Kweens Kouncil of Krusaders) that plans to target Mike via cross burning.
168	11	"Archie and the KKK: Part 2"	Paul Bogart	Bob Weiskopf & Bob Schiller	December 4, 1977
Archie tries to dissuade the Kweens Kouncil of Krusaders from carrying out their plans.
169	12	"Mike and Gloria Meet"	Paul Bogart	Bob Weiskopf & Bob Schiller	December 11, 1977
Flashbacks show Mike and Gloria's first date, arranged by Gloria's friend Debbie Ballantine (Priscilla Lopez).
170	13	"Edith's Crisis of Faith: Part 1"	Paul Bogart	S : Erik Tarloff; T : Bob Weiskopf, Bob Schiller	December 18, 1977
Beverly LaSalle (Lori Shannon) is murdered at Christmastime in a brutal hate crime, causing Edith to lose her faith in God.
171	14	"Edith's Crisis of Faith: Part 2"	Paul Bogart	T : Mel Tolkin, Larry Rhine; S/T : Erik Tarloff	December 25, 1977
The rest of the family try to help Edith regain her faith on Christmas following Beverly LaSalle's murder.: Recording date: December 2, 1977
172	15	"The Commercial"	Paul Bogart	T : Ben Starr; S/T : Ron Bloomberg	January 8, 1978
Edith is chosen to star in a laundry detergent commercial for a detergent, but cannot bring herself to praise the product. NOTE: Sally Struthers does not appear in this episode.
173	16	"Super Bowl Sunday"	Paul Bogart	Bob Weiskopf & Bob Schiller	January 15, 1978
A pair of robbers target Archie's bar on Super Bowl Sunday. NOTE: The episode aired right after Super Bowl XII.
174	17	"Aunt Iola's Visit"	Paul Bogart	S : Michael Loman; T : Albert E. Lewin	January 22, 1978
Edith's aunt Iola (Nedra Volz) comes to visit for two weeks and Archie fears she may never leave.: Recording date: December 16, 1977
175	18	"Love Comes to the Butcher"	Paul Bogart	Phil Sharp	February 5, 1978
The neighborhood butcher falls for Edith due to her words of kindness.: Recording date: January 13, 1978
176	19	"Two's a Crowd"	Paul Bogart	Phil Sharp	February 12, 1978
Archie and Mike get themselves locked in the storeroom of Archie's Place, where a surprise revelation gives Mike a sad new insight of his father-in-law. NOTE: Jean Stapleton and Sally Struthers do not appear in this episode.
177	20	"Stale Mates"	Paul Bogart	Bob Weiskopf & Bob Schiller	February 19, 1978
Mike and Gloria go on a second honeymoon to the Poconos to revive their marriage.
178	21	"Archie's Brother" "The Brother"	Paul Bogart	Larry Rhine and Mel Tolkin	February 26, 1978
Archie and his younger brother Fred (Richard McKenzie) reunite after being estranged for 29 years.
179	22	"Mike's New Job"	Paul Bogart	Mel Tolkin and Larry Rhine	March 5, 1978
Mike and Gloria prepare to move to California, but circumstances force them to temporarily move back in with the Bunkers.
180	23	"The Dinner Guest"	Paul Bogart	Larry Rhine and Mel Tolkin	March 12, 1978
Mike has to choose between Edith's farewell dinner and his new boss' social meeting. Part one of a two-part story arc.
181	24	"The Stivics Go West"	Paul Bogart	Bob Weiskopf & Bob Schiller	March 19, 1978
The Stivics move west, leaving the Bunkers to try and adjust without them. Conclusion of a two-part story arc.

=== Season 9 (1978–79) ===
No. overall	No. in season	Title	Directed by	Written by	Original release date
182	1	"Little Miss Bunker"	Paul Bogart	Mel Tolkin and Larry Rhine	September 24, 1978
Archie and Edith are joined by their young niece Stephanie Mills (Danielle Brisebois), the daughter of Edith's ne'er-do-well cousin Floyd.: Recording date: August 24 & 25, 1978
183	2	"End in Sight"	Paul Bogart	Nate Monaster	October 1, 1978
Archie thinks he is dying due to a spot on his liver, so he starts being nice.
184	3	"Reunion on Hauser Street"	Paul Bogart	Milt Josefsberg and Phil Sharp	October 8, 1978
Barney is miserable since his wife Blanche left him again and it's ruining Archie's business.
185	4	"What'll We Do With Stephanie?"	Paul Bogart	Larry Rhine and Mel Tolkin	October 15, 1978
Archie and Edith have a disagreement over what to do with Stephanie.
186	5	"Edith's Final Respects"	Paul Bogart	S : Sam Greenbaum; T : Bob Schiller, Bob Weiskopf	October 22, 1978
Edith is the only one to attend the funeral of her Aunt Rose, who never approved of Edith and Archie's marriage.
187	6	"Weekend in the Country"	Paul Bogart	Phil Sharp and Milt Josefsberg	October 29, 1978
The Bunkers spend a weekend in the country with Barney Hefner (Allan Melvin) and his wife Blanche (Estelle Parsons).
188	7	"Archie's Other Wife"	Paul Bogart	Bob Schiller & Bob Weiskopf	November 5, 1978
As another one of his practical jokes, Archie's friend Pinky Peterson (Eugene Roche) gets Archie drunk and arranges for him to wake up in his motel bed with a beautiful black stewardess (Jonelle Allen).
189	8	"Edith vs. the Bank"	Paul Bogart	Mel Tolkin and Larry Rhine	November 19, 1978
Edith tries to buy a television set for Archie, but the bank refuses to give her credit, leading her to try taking out a loan, which falls through.
190	9	"Return of the Waitress"	Paul Bogart	Milt Josefsberg and Phil Sharp	November 26, 1978
The waitress Harry hires at Archie's Place is the same one with whom Archie nearly had an affair.
191	10	"Bogus Bills"	Paul Bogart	Bob Schiller & Bob Weiskopf	December 3, 1978
As soon as Archie finds counterfeit $10 bills in the bar's cash register, Edith calls to tell him she has been arrested for using said counterfeit money.
192	11	"The Bunkers Go West"	Paul Bogart	Mel Tolkin and Larry Rhine	December 10, 1978
The Bunkers prepare for a visit from the Stivics at Christmastime—until Gloria says they cannot come due to Mike hurting his back.
193	12	"California, Here We Are"	Paul Bogart	Milt Josefsberg & Phil Sharp and Bob Schiller & Bob Weiskopf	December 17, 1978
194	13	"California, Here We Are"	Paul Bogart	Milt Josefsberg & Phil Sharp and Bob Schiller & Bob Weiskopf	December 17, 1978
The Bunkers arrive in California to learn that Mike and Gloria are separated and contemplating divorce.
195	14	"A Night at the PTA"	Paul Bogart	Larry Rhine and Mel Tolkin	January 7, 1979
Edith is excited to perform the song "Sister Kate" with Stephanie in her school's talent show, until she contracts laryngitis from over-practicing.
196	15	"A Girl Like Edith"	Paul Bogart	Bob Schiller & Bob Weiskopf	January 14, 1979
Klemmer the butcher stops by to show off his fiancée, Judith Klemmerstadt (Jean Stapleton in a dual role), who thinks he still has feelings for Edith. NOTE: Although Jean Stapleton played Klemmer's fiancée Judith in this episode, she is credited in the closing credits as "Giovanna Pucci", an Italian translation/play on words of Stapleton's first name, Jean, and her married name, Putch.
197	16	"The Appendectomy"	Paul Bogart	Phil Sharp and Milt Josefsberg	January 21, 1979
Stephanie develops appendicitis on her tenth birthday, but the Bunkers' doctor, Seymour Shapiro is unavailable to perform Stephanie's appendectomy. However, his son Sidney (George Wyner) is available, but Archie is reluctant to let him operate on his niece, putting Stephanie's life in danger.
198	17	"Stephanie and the Crime Wave"	Paul Bogart	Mel Tolkin and Larry Rhine	January 28, 1979
Stephanie is accused of stealing at school as several items go missing from the Bunker household.
199	18	"Barney the Gold Digger"	Paul Bogart	S : Winston Moss; T : Bob Schiller, Bob Weiskopf, Phil Sharp, Milt Josefsberg	February 5, 1979
When Barney Hefner's wife Blanche leaves him again, the Bunkers fix him up with a wealthy widow (Peggy Rea).
200	19	"The Return of Archie's Brother"	Paul Bogart	S : Tom Sawyer; S/T : Bob Schiller, Bob Weiskopf	February 11, 1979
Archie's newly repaired relationship with his younger brother Fred (Richard McKenzie) is in danger of crumbling again when Fred drops by with his new 18-year-old wife, causing Archie to hit the roof.
201	20	"Stephanie's Conversion"	Paul Bogart	Patt Shea and Harriett Weiss	February 18, 1979
When the Bunkers learn that Stephanie was born Jewish, Archie raises her in that faith (albeit under duress).
202	21	"Edith Gets Fired"	Paul Bogart	S : Mort Lachman; T : Harriett Weiss, Patt Shea	February 25, 1979
Edith is fired from the Sunshine Home for not getting help for a terminally ill patient (Angela Clarke) who wanted to die in peace.
—	—	"The 200th Episode Celebration of All in the Family" "All in the Family Retrospective"	Walter C. Miller	Norman Lear & Mort Lachman and Milt Josefsberg	March 4, 1979
Norman Lear hosts a 90-minute retrospective looking back at the best moments of All in the Family.
203	22	"The Family Next Door"	Paul Bogart	Mel Tolkin and Larry Rhine	March 11, 1979
Archie wants Edith to preserve the dignity of the neighborhood in picking new tenants for the Jeffersons' old house. Guest starring: Isabel Sanford, Jason Wingreen, David Byrd, Janet MacLachlan and Richard Ward.
204	23	"The Return of Stephanie's Father"	Paul Bogart	Larry Rhine and Mel Tolkin	March 25, 1979
Stephanie's deadbeat father Floyd wants $1,000 from the Bunkers if they want her to keep living with them.
205	24	"Too Good Edith"	Paul Bogart	Harriett Weiss & Patt Shea	April 8, 1979
Edith tries to prepare a St. Patrick's Day dinner in spite of her phlebitis. This is the final AITF episode leading up to the series' spin-off, Archie Bunker's Place.

== See also ==
- List of Archie Bunker's Place episodes
