= Gloria Stivic =

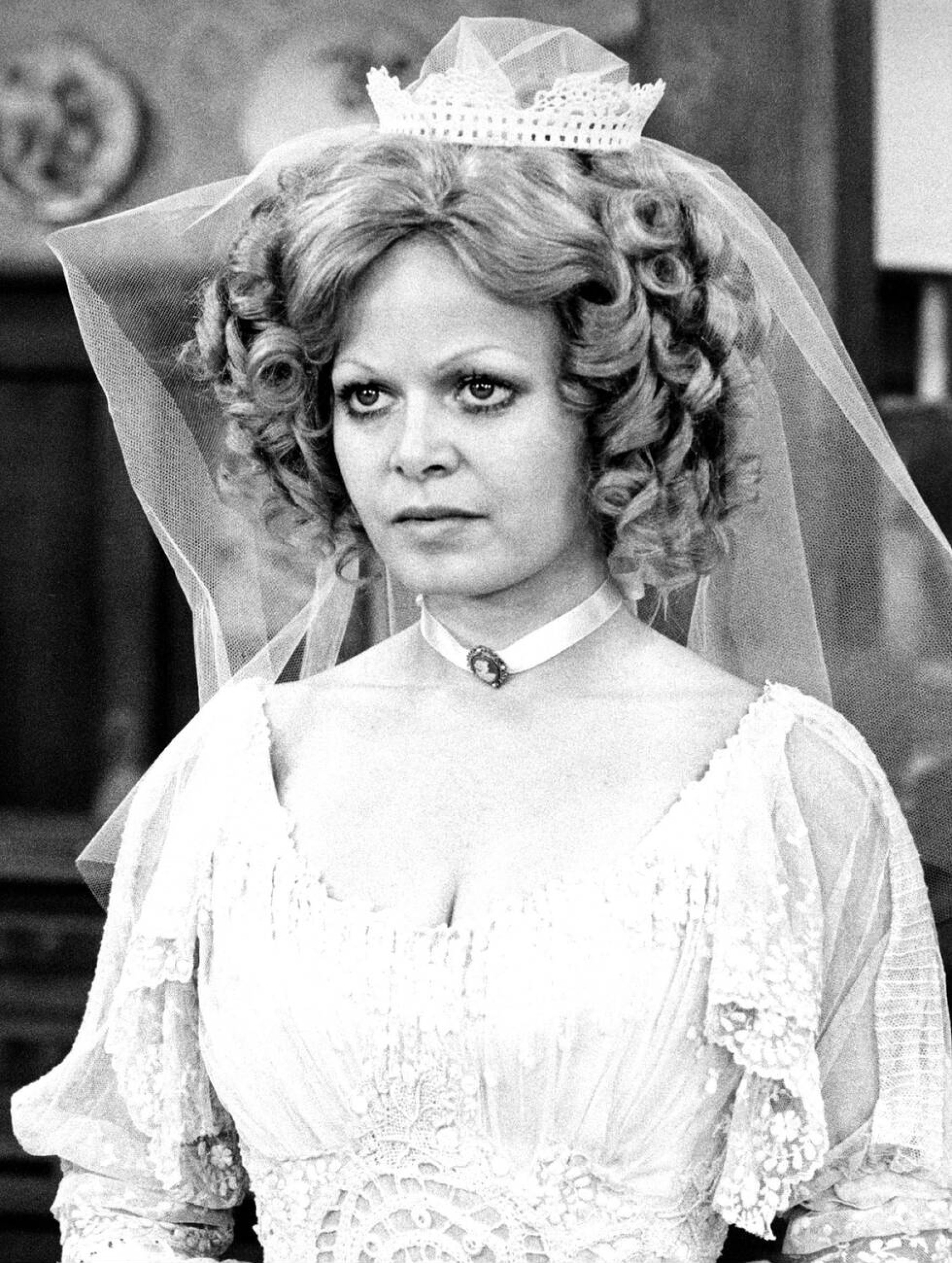
- Sally Struthers as Gloria Stivic
- First appearance: "Meet the Bunkers" (All in the Family)
- Last appearance: "An Uncredited Woman" (Gloria)
- Portrayed by: Sally Struthers (All in the Family and Gloria); Ellie Kemper (Live in Front of a Studio Audience)

In-universe information
- Gender: Female
- Occupation: Department store employee; veterinarian's assistant
- Family: Archie Bunker (father); Edith Bunker (mother)
- Spouse: Michael Stivic (1970–1982; divorced)
- Children: Joey Stivic
- Relatives: David Bunker (grandfather); Sarah Bunker (grandmother); Alfred Bunker (uncle); Philip Bunker (uncle); Alma Bunker (aunt); Harry Baines (uncle); Gertrude Baines (aunt); Helen Baines (aunt); Linda Bunker (cousin); Barbara "Billie" Bunker (cousin); Debbie Bunker (cousin); Maude Findlay (cousin); Stephanie Mills ("cousin")

Gloria Stivic is a fictional character played by Sally Struthers on the American situation comedy All in the Family (which aired on the CBS television network from 1971 until 1979) and the spin-off series Gloria (CBS, 1982–83). The only child of Archie and Edith Bunker, Gloria is married to—and eventually divorced from—Michael Stivic. She was born 11 months after Archie and Edith were married, according to the fifth-season episode “The Longest Kiss”.

== Character overview ==
Gloria is often caught in the middle of arguments between her liberal husband Michael and her conservative father, Archie. As her relationship with Michael progresses, Gloria concludes that her father is wrong about a lot of things and sides with her husband's liberal beliefs. Despite his affection for her, Michael is also using his marriage to persuade long-sheltered Gloria to share his own beliefs as well.

Edith mentions (in the pilot) that Gloria was overprotected as a child due to being anemic. Archie often refers to her as his "little goil" [girl].

In season 7's "Mike and Gloria Meet", it is explained that Mike and Gloria met in 1969, the evening of President Nixon's inauguration (Michael had been planning to protest the event, but opted to go on a blind date with Gloria instead). They did not initially like each other, until they discovered that they share a love of ballroom dancing. They married in 1970 in Archie and Edith's home in a civil ceremony (as a means of compromise between Archie's wish that they are wed by a Protestant minister and Michael's Uncle Cass' insistence for a Catholic priest).

Gloria is the main breadwinner for the couple while they live in her parents' home during their first five years of marriage. With Michael attending college, initially for a bachelor's degree and then continuing for his master's, Gloria works full-time at a department store. She is sensitive about having only a high school education and sometimes feels that Michael condescends to her, particularly during arguments.

Upon Michael's graduation, he and Gloria move to the neighboring rental property owned by former neighbor George Jefferson, where the Jeffersons reside between seasons 1 and 5. At that time Gloria becomes pregnant. She gives birth to a boy, Joey Stivic, and becomes a stay-at-home mother, while Michael begins his teaching career. The Stivics later move to Santa Barbara, California after Michael is offered a better paying associate professor's position at the University of California, Santa Barbara (UCSB).

The Stivics' marriage is tested after Gloria engages in an affair with Bud Kreeger, a college faculty colleague of Michael's. Gloria confesses this affair to her parents, while remaining silent about sleeping with him, during Archie and Edith's Christmas visit to California.

Michael is later arrested for engaging in a nude protest at a proposed nuclear power plant site. This costs Michael his well-paid job at UCSB and leaves the Stivics cash-strapped. By February 1982, Michael abandons his wife and son to join a commune with one of his students, betraying a promise he makes to Archie before leaving for California that he will always take care of Gloria and Joey.

Struthers continued playing the character of Gloria Bunker in guest appearances on Archie Bunker's Place and on the 1982–1983 related series Gloria, in which she is divorced from Michael and finds employment in an upstate New York veterinarian's office. In this series, she is working towards becoming a fully qualified veterinarian's assistant while raising Joey as a single mother. Over the course of the show, she becomes romantically involved with Clark V. Uhley Jr., another assistant in the same practice.

== Sally Struthers view on character ==
According to Sally Struthers, Gloria was presented as the "fourth banana" compared to the other three lead All In The Family characters. Despite speaking fondly of All In The Family as a show, and continuing to play Gloria, Struthers revealed in January 2025 that she actually "wasn't a huge fan" of All in The Family creator Norman Lear, who she alleged treated her negatively, and had in fact sued, though unsuccessfully, to leave the show in 1975. Even before this revelation, Struthers was openly critical of how she regarded Gloria to be static. Struthers described only the time between the sixth and eighth seasons of All in The Family, which aired from 1975 to 1978 and which occurred after her lawsuit, as "the most fun" she had playing the character, though she still desired to quit playing Gloria at the time she left the show in 1978.
