= Lori Shannon =

American drag queen, actor, and comedian

- Born: Don Seymour McClean; May 18, 1938; Santa Barbara, California U.S.
- Died: February 13, 1984 (aged 45); San Francisco, California, U.S.
- Occupation: Actor
- Years active: 1975–1980

Lori Shannon (May 18, 1938 – February 13, 1984) was an American drag actress, most widely known for his recurring role from 1975 to 1977 as Beverly LaSalle on the popular sitcom All in the Family. He was associated with the drag revues at Finocchio's club in San Francisco, and wrote an entertainment column for the Bay Area Reporter.

== Biography ==
Shannon stood 6 ft 5 in (1.96 m) in his heels and considered himself "a stand-up comic in a dress", who enjoyed startling tourists with one-liners at Finocchio's.

Shannon appeared in three episodes of the CBS sitcom All in the Family as Beverly LaSalle, a female impersonator: "Archie the Hero" (1975), in which Archie Bunker gives him mouth-to-mouth resuscitation, not realizing he is male; "Beverly Rides Again" (1976), in which Archie uses him to play a practical joke on a friend; and "Edith's Crisis of Faith, Part 1" (1977), in which his murder leads Edith Bunker to question her faith in God. The role was noteworthy for its uncommonly respectful and sympathetic treatment of Beverly as a "transvestite".

On February 13, 1984, Shannon died of a heart attack at the age of 45 at Mission Emergency Hospital in San Francisco.
