= Maude Findlay =

Maude Chadbourne Findlay
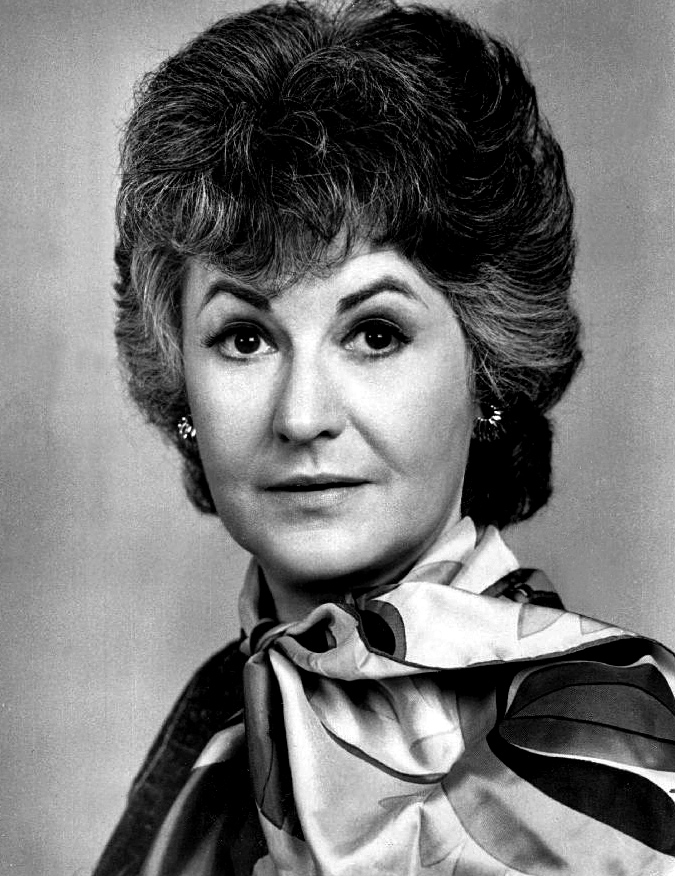
- Maude, played by Bea Arthur
- First appearance: "Cousin Maude's Visit" (All in the Family)
- Last appearance: "Maude's Big Move: Part 3" (Maude)
- Portrayed by: Bea Arthur

In-universe information
- Gender: Female
- Occupation: Housewife, Realestate Agent, Congresswoman
- Family: Florence Chadbourne (mother)
- Spouse: Fred Barney (1945–1950); Chester Claiborne (1952–1954); Albert Hilliard (1963–1964); Walter Findlay (married 1968)
- Children: Carol Traynor
- Relatives: Philip Traynor (grandson); Steve Frazier (nephew); Henry (uncle); Lola Ashburn (aunt); Gertrude (aunt); Edith Bunker (cousin); Harry Baines (cousin); Gertrude Baines (cousin); Helen Baines (cousin); Marshall Keebler (cousin); Gloria Stivic (cousin)

Maude Findlay is a fictional character and protagonist on the controversial 1970s sitcom Maude, portrayed by the Emmy-winning actress Bea Arthur.

== All in the Family ==
Maude Findlay first appeared on All in the Family in December 1971, in the second-season episode, "Cousin Maude's Visit", as the cousin of Edith Bunker. According to Norman Lear, the creation of Maude stemmed from the idea to bring on someone who could hold their own with Archie Bunker verbally. The debut episode, and character's name, were loosely based upon a 1968 episode of Till Death Us Do Part, the British sitcom on which All in the Family was based, in which Maud, the sister of Else Garnett (the analog to the American Edith Bunker), visits Alf Garnett (Archie's progenitor) while Alf is ill. The character was also loosely based on Lear's then-wife Frances.

Maude cared for Edith, but disliked her husband, Archie Bunker. Archie and Maude were known for getting on each other's nerves, especially since she was a liberal and Archie was a conservative. Because she was a liberal, Maude was also an ally of Edith's daughter Gloria (Sally Struthers) and her husband Mike (Rob Reiner).

In her first appearance on All in the Family, it was said that Maude was widowed twice. Her first husband, Fred, died of a brain aneurysm, and her second husband, Bert, died of a heart seizure. (Archie remarked they both had smiles on their faces at their funerals.) When Maude premiered, Fred was now renamed Barney and Bert became Albert Hilliard, her third husband. A second appearance on All in the Family (the final episode of the second season) depicting Archie and Edith visiting Maude for a family wedding, essentially set up the premise for the forthcoming series.

== Maude ==
Maude debuted on CBS on September 12, 1972. On her own show, Maude lives in Tuckahoe, New York, and is married, for the fourth time, to Walter Findlay (Bill Macy), the owner and operator of an appliance store called Findlay's Friendly Appliances. They met during the 1968 Democratic National Convention, where she had ardently supported Hubert Humphrey.
