= Edith Bunker =

Fictional character

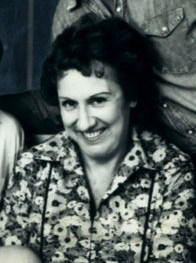
- Jean Stapleton as Edith Bunker
- First appearance: "Meet the Bunkers" (All in the Family) (first aired January 12, 1971)
- Last appearance: "The Shabbat Dinner" (Archie Bunker's Place) (first aired December 9, 1979)
- Created by: Norman Lear
- Portrayed by: Jean Stapleton (All in the Family and Archie Bunker’s Place); Marisa Tomei (Live in Front of a Studio Audience); Randy Davison (America's Funniest People)

In-universe information
- Occupation: housewife elder-care caretaker
- Family: Harry Baines (brother); Gertrude Baines (sister); Helen Baines (sister)
- Spouse: Archie Bunker (m. 1948)
- Children: Gloria Stivic (daughter)
- Relatives: Joey Stivic (grandson); Florence Chadbourne (aunt); Rose Baines (aunt); Iola (aunt); Clara (aunt); Elizabeth (aunt); Maude Findlay (cousin); Stephanie Mills ("niece"); Floyd Mills (step-cousin); Amelia DeKuyper (cousin); Liz (cousin); Michael Stivic (son-in-law)

Edith Bunker (née Baines) is a fictional character on the 1970s sitcom All in the Family (and occasionally Archie Bunker's Place), played by Jean Stapleton. She is married to Archie Bunker, mother of Gloria Stivic, mother-in-law of Michael "Meathead" Stivic, and grandmother of Joey Stivic. Her cousin is Maude Findlay (Bea Arthur), one of Archie's nemeses.

While Edith is typically a traditional and usually subservient wife, Jean Stapleton was a noted feminist.

Series creator Norman Lear said on All Things Considered that the reason why Archie would always tell Edith to stifle herself was because Lear's father told his mother to "stifle".

== Character and background ==
Edith Bunker is an undereducated but kind, cheery, and loving woman. She is less politically opinionated than the rest of the family. Her main role is as the matriarch who keeps her family intact. Archie once described Edith's father as a man "with no chin and a 'go funny' eye." A native of Scranton, Pennsylvania, she was born in January 1925. She later migrated to New York City, where she lived most of her life and died in her sleep of a stroke in September 1980, at age 55. She attended Millard Fillmore High School and was in the graduating class of 1943. Her high school had only one reunion (the 30th) in 1973, which she attended. At some point, she met Archie at the Puritan Maid Ice Cream Parlor. In the episode "Archie Goes Too Far" Edith reads her diary and reveals that she received letters in May 1943 from Archie while he was overseas serving in the Army Air Corps.

Her character and accent change somewhat between the first and second seasons. In the earliest episodes, she is the "put-upon wife," often bemoaning (though softly) her husband's behavior or comments: also during the first season, Jean Stapleton spoke more in her own range (albeit with a pronounced accent), rather than the nasal, high pitched voice for which Edith is generally remembered. By the second season, she becomes the character more familiar to viewers: kind, utterly non-judgmental, and fully dedicated to her husband.

In the second episode of the first season, "Writing the President", Edith remarks how, before her marriage in 1946, she got a job and started working for the "Hercules Plumbing Company". By the second season, her husband becomes "Awwchie." In the third-season episode "The Battle of the Month" and fourth-season episode "Gloria Sings the Blues," Edith reveals that her parents almost divorced after a nasty fight and that although they stayed married, things were never the same between them. This deeply affected her and her views on marriage, marital fighting, and social conduct. In the fourth-season episode "Archie the Gambler," Edith reveals that her father was addicted to gambling and almost brought his family to ruin (an experience which led Edith to put her foot down twice regarding Archie's similar gambling problem - and once slap him).

Though All In The Family drew inspiration from the British series Till Death Us Do Part, Edith, by the second season, was noticeably different than her more dysfunctional and narrow-minded British counterpart Else Garnett. Edith is the voice of reason and rock of understanding, often contributing a unique perspective to a topic. She is decidedly less bigoted than Archie (e.g., she is good friends with her Black neighbor Louise Jefferson, while Archie is always at odds with her and husband George). Though her opinions sometimes sharply differ from Archie's, she is intensely loyal to her husband, often sticks up for him and stands by him in his times of need. She is the most naïve family member and the happiest character on the show. For example, in a conversation with Gloria, Edith stated that she favored capital punishment, "as long as it ain't too severe." In the episode "Cousin Liz" (in which the Bunkers learn that her recently deceased cousin Liz was a lesbian and that her "roommate" Veronica had actually been Liz's life partner), Edith is at first shocked at the revelation, but quickly throws her arms around Veronica and warmly accepts her as Liz's "true next-of-kin", giving her the tea set that Liz's spouse would legally have inherited. Edith was popular among audiences for her sweetness, unconditionally loving everyone she knew and staying optimistic during tragedy. Despite cooperating with Archie, Edith doesn't share much of her husband's prejudices. Examples of this are shown through her friendships with Louise Jefferson and drag queen Beverly LaSalle, both of whom Archie is less cooperative with. Unlike the staunchly conservative Archie, Edith also supported Jimmy Carter.

In contrast, in a memorable episode in the show's second season, Edith uncharacteristically snaps at Archie, repeatedly telling him (as he frequently did to her) to "stifle". Edith, who otherwise never cursed, also loudly instructs the family to "Leave me alone, damnit!" After a visit to the doctor, Gloria explains to Archie that he needs to be sensitive to the fact that Edith is going through menopause. Later on in the episode, a frustrated Archie yells at Edith "When I had the hernia I didn't make you wear the truss. Now if you're gonna have a change of life, you gotta do it right now. I'm gonna give you 30 seconds! Now come on, change!" In another episode, Edith, in a conversation with Gloria, wonders whether men go through "women-pause."

When All in the Family premiered in 1971, Edith was a homemaker. In 1974 Edith got a part-time job as a caretaker at the Sunshine Home. She later was a partner in Archie's business, Archie's Place, the tavern he purchased in 1977. (In truth, she wasn't a legal partner, as Archie forged her signature on the bank loan application for the purchase of the pub.) Edith loses her job at the Sunshine Home in 1979 (for violating company policy by allowing a terminally ill woman to die and failing to inform the staff), but in an early episode of Archie Bunker's Place, she finds a similar caretaker's job at a mental health facility.

Edith is most known for her shrill voice (her trademark "Oh, Aaaaaaaaaaw-chie!" became popular among viewers) and her flighty demeanor. The latter character trait causes Archie to call her "dingbat". However, Archie truly loves his wife and wants what is best for both of them. Frequently, he consults with her when something bothers him (such as the episode, "Archie and the KKK," where a distressed Archie asks Edith for advice on how to prevent a cross burning).

More than once, Edith sharply chastises Archie for casting judgment against other people, particularly when he mentions God. Two notable examples came in the episodes "Cousin Liz" (Archie went on a diatribe about how God hates gays) and "California, Here We Are" (where, upon learning that Gloria's near affair had almost destroyed the Stivics' marriage, berates the "Little Goil" and says that the matter is "God's business"). In both instances, Edith warned Archie to back off and says that God should be left to deal with those matters and the people involved. She also becomes close friends with a transvestite person/drag performer known as Beverly LaSalle (Lori Shannon) who comes into their lives when Archie saves his life with CPR, remaining friends with him, despite Archie's discomfort. Edith later has a crisis of faith after Beverly's death protecting Mike from muggers.

Edith also serves as the voice of reason for Mike and on several occasions corrects him when, as she says, "He's been acting all stuck up." She explains to Mike that Archie yells at him not because he hates Mike but because he is jealous of Mike's many opportunities in life. Edith also, on many occasions, helps Gloria to understand that Gloria's feminist views, while correct, do not mean other viewpoints are necessarily any less valid.

Edith is described by Archie's father as being "too smart" for him because, while Edith appears to have less-than-average intelligence, she is very wise about life and the way the world works.

Around the house, Edith usually runs, eager to please others without them having to wait. This included answering the doorbell or phone and running to the kitchen to get Archie a beer.

In "The Saga of Cousin Oscar", Edith mentions she has two sisters, Helen and Gertrude. In "Lionel Steps Out," she mentions a brother, Harry.

The character suffers intermittently throughout the series. Edith goes through menopause in the second season ("Edith's Problem"), discovers a lump in her breast just before Christmas in the fourth season ("Edith's Christmas Story"), is nearly raped on her 50th birthday in the eighth season ("Edith's 50th Birthday") and in season nine briefly contracts laryngitis ("A Night at the PTA") and develops phlebitis in the show's final episode ("Too Good Edith"). The first episode of the second season of Archie Bunker's Place ("Archie Alone") reveals that Edith has died as the result of a stroke.

== Death ==
Beneath his crusty, irascible exterior, Archie is intensely protective of Edith and becomes upset at the mere thought of losing her. In the episode "Too Good Edith," the 209th and final episode of All in the Family, Edith becomes seriously ill while frantically helping Archie cook a large Irish dinner for a St. Patrick's Day party at the bar. She had been suffering from phlebitis and decided not to tell Archie, but when he finds out about it he scolds her for hiding it from him.

In the sequel series Archie Bunker's Place, Archie's worst nightmare becomes a reality when Edith dies (off-camera) from a stroke. In the one-hour Season 2 premiere, "Archie Alone" (which first aired on November 2, 1980), Archie is still in denial weeks after Edith's death and refuses to take Stephanie to visit her grave. Near the episode's end, after neighbors and friends had removed Edith's personal items to help him to cope, Archie, alone in the now-empty bedroom, finds one of her pink slippers left behind underneath the bed, and breaks down in tears as he recalls the morning he discovered Edith had died in her sleep during the night:

"It wasn't s'posed to be like this, y'know; I was s'posed to be the first one to go. I know I always used to kid ya about you going first; you know I never meant none of that. And that morning when ya was layin' there, I was shakin' you an' yellin' at you to go down and fix my breakfast, I didn't know. Ya had no right to leave me that way, Edith, without givin' me just one more chance to say I love you..."

Fearing being typecast in "submissive" roles, Jean Stapleton had wished to leave her role as a regular character, although she was open to guest appearances (in interviews, Stapleton has stated the role of Edith had reached its potential). Her appearances in the prior season sharply declined: she appeared in only four episodes of the 1979–1980 season. It was with great reluctance that producer Norman Lear agreed to have the character killed off, despite CBS being willing to do so. When Stapleton reminded him that Edith was a fictional character, Lear took a long pause, causing Stapleton to think she had hurt him. Finally, Lear said, "To me, she isn't [fictional]," but ultimately made the decision to have Edith die.

Stapleton later appeared as a presenter on the 1981 Primetime Emmy Awards telecast (after the episode "Archie Alone" aired) and said to the viewing audience: "See! I'm still here!"

== Cultural impact ==
Edith and Archie's chairs have been noted as famous pieces of history by their inclusion in the National Museum of American History. In 1992, Edith was impersonated by Randy Davison on America's Funniest People. In 2009, Edith Bunker was included in Yahoo!'s Top 10 TV Moms from Six Decades of Television for the decade 1971–1979.
