= Michael Stivic =

Sitcom character

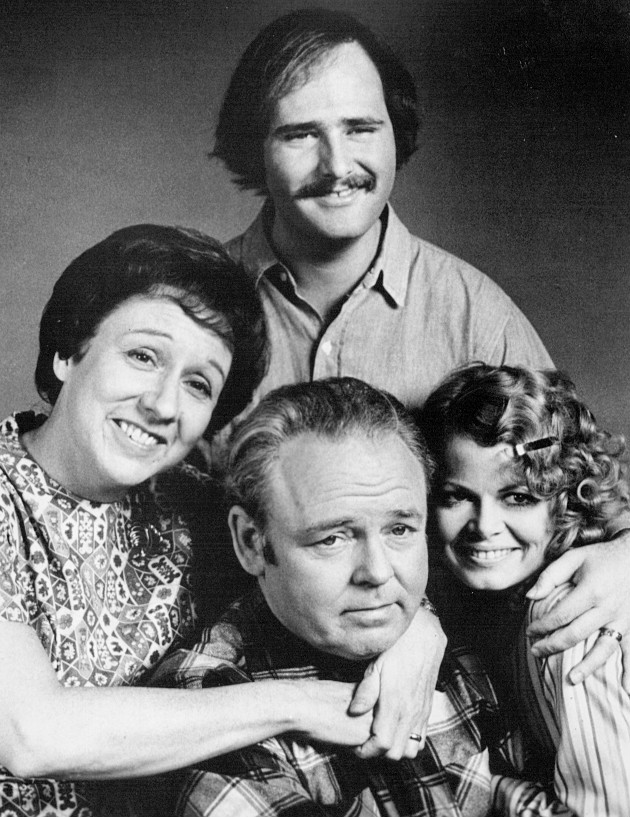
- Mike "Meathead" Stivic (Rob Reiner, top) with the Bunkers: Archie (Carroll O'Connor, bottom); Edith (Jean Stapleton, left); and Gloria (Sally Struthers, right) in cast photo, 1975
- First appearance: "Meet the Bunkers" (All in the Family)
- Last appearance: "Thanksgiving Reunion: Part 2" (Archie Bunker's Place)
- Created by: Norman Lear; Based on Mike Rawlins, a character created by Johnny Speight
- Portrayed by: Rob Reiner (All in the Family); Ike Barinholtz (Live in Front of a Studio Audience)

In-universe information
- Occupation: College student (1971–1975); Professor (1975–1979)
- Spouse: Gloria Bunker (1971–1982; divorced)
- Children: Joey Stivic (son)
- Relatives: Casimir Stivic (uncle); Alexsander Stivic (uncle)

Michael Casimir "Mike" Stivic is a fictional character played by Rob Reiner on the 1970s American television sitcom All in the Family. He is the live-in son-in-law of the series' lead character, Archie Bunker, who frequently calls him "Meathead". Michael is the husband of Archie's daughter Gloria (played by Sally Struthers).

== Character overview ==
The character of Michael Stivic is an Americanized version of the British original: Till Death Us Do Part's Mike Rawlins, the Trotskyist "Randy Scouse Git" who arouses the passionate ire of his conservative father-in-law Alf Garnett. For the American version, the Trotskyist angle is drastically softened: Michael Stivic is a social liberal and somewhat of a leftist, but does not adhere to any form of communism. He is sympathetic to the Students for a Democratic Society movement (SDS), which is suggested by his occasional use of SDS ally and Yippie leader Abbie Hoffman's guerrilla theatre antics. However, rather than espousing more radical political activists, Stivic tended to more frequently cite people like Ralph Nader as his biggest influences.

A Polish-American from Chicago, Michael is orphaned at a young age when a car crash claims the lives of his parents. He is raised by his uncle Casimir Stivic, a former Marine lieutenant turned florist, who calls him "Mickey" with great affection. He also has an uncle Alex.

When All in the Family begins, Michael is married to Gloria and shares a bedroom with her in the home of her parents, whom he addresses as "Ma" and "Archie" (or "Arch"), while focusing his efforts on earning a college degree in sociology. His first meeting with Archie (seen in flashback) portrays him as a bearded hippie with a tie-dyed shirt. His wardrobe throughout most of the series is much more subdued: most often he wears a denim shirt, jeans, and boots. He shaves his beard for his wedding with Gloria, but keeps his mustache afterwards (on rare occasions later in the series, however, he would sport a clean-shaven look) and wears his hair well below the collar. (Reiner's hairline receded very rapidly early in the series and he began wearing a toupee when playing the character.) In season 2, episode 5, "Flashback: Mike Meets Archie" (October 16, 1971), Michael and Gloria celebrate their first wedding anniversary. A 1972 episode centers on their second anniversary and the 1978 episode "The Stivics Go West" reveals that the couple are nearing their ninth anniversary.

In the show's early years, conflicts between left-leaning Michael and his bigoted father-in-law Archie Bunker are exacerbated by the characters living under the same roof. This arrangement, which begins immediately after Michael and Gloria's wedding, allows Michael to save for his college tuition. On their second wedding anniversary, he mentions lecturing Archie for "these past couple years I've been around here." (During his first meeting with Archie, Michael complains to Gloria that not only is he about to have Archie as a father-in-law, he'll soon be living with him until he graduates.) The close proximity results in frequent disputes, often over the simplest of topics, such as the proper order for putting on socks and shoes. Other conflicts involve Michael's propensity for sitting in Archie's coveted chair and his huge appetite for the food purchased with Archie's working-class paycheck. Their ideological differences greatly contribute to the conflict between the characters. Michael is a determined agnostic, although he occasionally identifies himself as an atheist to provoke Archie, who assumes Michael has no belief in God. This is a stark contrast to Edith's quiet Christian church attendance and his own non-practicing but nonetheless staunchly Christian viewpoint. Michael is also a dedicated humanitarian who wants to change the world. Originally intending to become a social worker, he shifts his career aspirations toward teaching as the series progresses. When the neighboring Jefferson family leaves the neighborhood, Michael and Gloria are able to rent the house from patriarch George, finally giving the couple a home of their own. The new arrangement eases the tension between Michael and Archie, but still allows for frequent visits and interactions between all of the family members.

Michael enjoys a warm relationship with Edith, whom he calls "Ma". She frequently intervenes to try to defuse tensions between her husband and son-in-law, though she also occasionally takes Mike to task for initiating unnecessary arguments with Archie. In the 1973 episode "Games Bunkers Play", Edith offers Michael some insight into Archie's attitude toward him. She explains that Archie dropped out of high school to help support his family during the Depression, and he resents the fact that Michael has the chance to attend college and advance his education.

Michael is presented as a representative of the counterculture of the 1960s (reflecting current events during the run of the series). Michael is a dedicated academic, however, and there is no suggestion of the drug use or "free love" of that subculture. It is revealed in the season eight episode "Gloria and Mike Meet" that in 1969, Michael's dedication to humanitarianism was galvanized in order to weaken support for newly elected President Richard Nixon. Additionally, he was probably a member of the SDS's newly formed Worker Student Alliance that sought to encourage university students to find ways to fix problems within the working class.

Though supportive of human rights, Michael at times displays male chauvinism as well: he objects to having his appendix removed by a female doctor and reveals himself to be a sore loser when playing a board game called Group Therapy with his family and neighbors. He differs with Archie over the potential successes women and racial minorities can achieve. Michael also believes that neither can evolve socially without a quality education from people like himself. This view is demonstrated when he falsely characterizes a blue-collar handyman's black assistant as a minstrel show stereotype who dons the same "happy-go-lucky" attire as his boss in the season 3 episode "Everybody Tells the Truth" (Archie's version is just as stereotyped—the assistant is a member of the Black Power movement and his boss is a mafia thug). Michael is also determined to ensure that Gloria shares his beliefs.

In 1971, Michael is surprised but excited to learn that Gloria is pregnant, though the pregnancy ends in a miscarriage. Gloria becomes pregnant again in 1975, and their baby Joseph "Joey" Stivic is born in December of that year.

During early episodes, Michael's best friend is Lionel Jefferson. In the first season, Lionel surprises Michael by announcing that he and his family are moving into the house next door. However, the characters rarely see or refer to each other after the Jeffersons leave All in the Family to join the spin-off The Jeffersons. George Jefferson, however, later makes a guest appearance at his former residence when the Stivics start preparing for their move to California and meet with him to give notice that they will no longer be staying in his house. Another of Michael's close friends, Al Bender (played by Billy Crystal), marries Gloria's best friend Trudy Tannen in a 1976 episode.

A staunch pacifist, Michael was never being shy about speaking out against the Vietnam War throughout the series. However, he would eventually find himself questioning his pacifism in 1977 following an incident where he had to resort to punching in order to save a woman from being strangled to death. The same year, Michael decided to no longer discuss the Vietnam War.

Mike accepts a faculty position at the University of California, Santa Barbara, and he and Gloria move to California at the end of the 1977–78 season (at which time Reiner and Struthers ceased to be regulars on the show). They appear in a Christmas episode during the 1978–79 season, in which Archie, Edith, and Edith's niece Stephanie visit Michael and Gloria, exposing the fact that the couple have secretly separated due to troubles in their marriage, including Gloria's infidelity with one of Michael's college faculty colleagues. Though they seemingly resolve their differences during this episode, a Thanksgiving visit by Mike and Gloria during the 1979-80 season of Archie Bunker's Place shows that the Stivics' marriage is still troubled, exacerbated by Michael having lost his job after he and Gloria participate in a nude protest at a proposed nuclear power plant site and are arrested. This is the last appearance of the Michael Stivic character.

Michael Stivic does not appear in the 1982 spin-off series Gloria, which starred Sally Struthers. Initially, Reiner had been asked to participate in the series and resurrect his Michael Stivic character, but he declined. The separation occurred by February 1982, with Gloria briefly returning home to 704 Hauser Street around this time. It was explained on different occasions in 1982 that Michael left his wife and young son Joey (then played by Christian Jacobs) to live in a California commune with one of his students—whom Gloria described as "the homecoming queen," and in the first episode of Gloria revealed her to also to be "a girl named Muffy"— and is in the process of going through a bitter divorce. It was also explained that Michael, having disdain with accepting the 1980s environment and the firmer influence which Ronald Reagan held, wanted to drop out from living in the ordinary world, with Gloria being more willing to accept it regardless of its challenges. At the beginning of the series Gloria (September 1982), it has been 63 days since Michael walked out on Gloria; he calls to invite her to the commune, but things deteriorate quickly when he claims Gloria is incapable of holding a job or of supporting herself and Joey. By the end of the series (spring 1983), the divorce is final.

=== "Meathead" ===
Beginning with their first meeting, Archie routinely refers to Michael by the derogatory nickname "Meathead", as seen in a flashback in the second-season episode "Mike Meets Archie". In Archie's own words, it means "dead from the neck up. Meat...head."

A later episode of All in the Family reveals that Archie Bunker himself was referred to as "Meathead" in his youth.

Series creator Norman Lear said his father used to call him "Meathead".
