= Fran Bennett =

American actress (1937–2021)

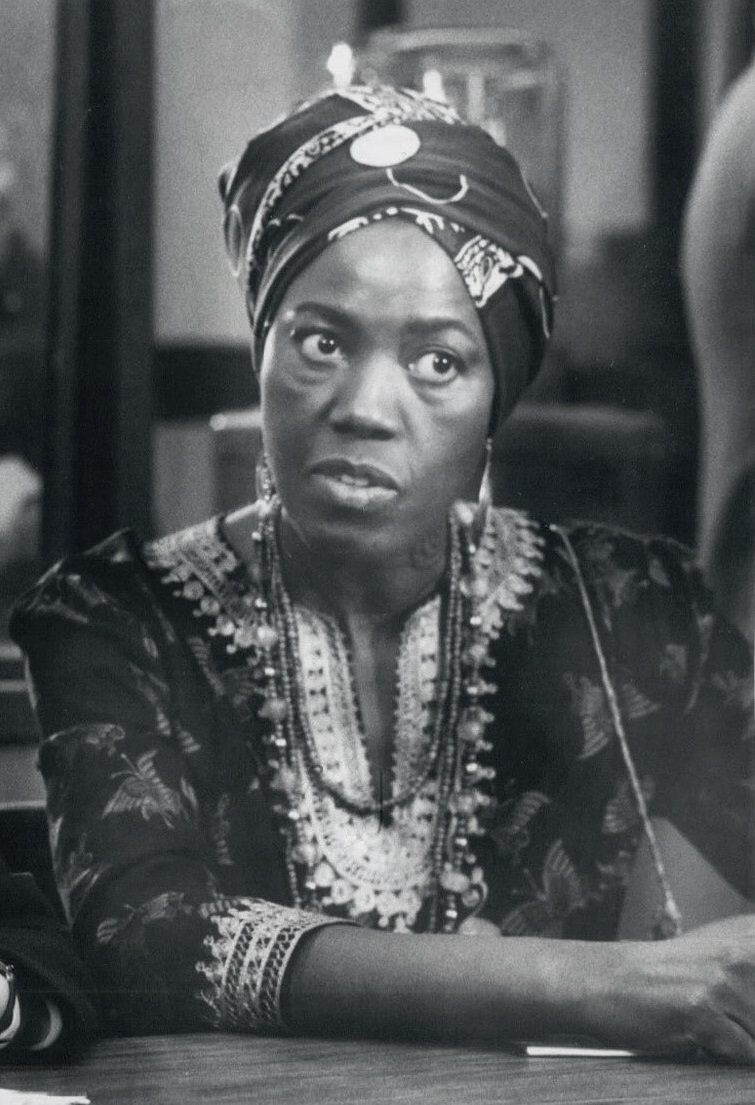
- Bennett in Lou Grant, 1981
- Born: August 14, 1937; Malvern, Arkansas, U.S.
- Died: September 12, 2021 (aged 84); Los Angeles, California, U.S.
- Occupation: Actress
- Years active: 1961–2021
- Employers: CalArts School of Theater, 1996-2003; Antaeus Theatre Company; Los Angeles Women's Shakespeare Company; London Academy of Dramatic Art
- Notable work: Lead in "King Lear", Center for New Theater, Los Angeles, 2002
- Television: The Bold and the Beautiful; Diff'rent Strokes; Guiding Light; Quantum Leap; Roots: The Next Generations; Scandal
- Honours: NAACP Theatre Award; AEA/AFTRA/SAG Diversity Award; Arkansas Black Hall of Fame, inducted 2005

Fran Bennett (August 14, 1937 – September 12, 2021) was an American actress, known for her works in theater and on television. She portrayed the role of Mother Olivia Jefferson in a re-creation of the pilot episode of The Jeffersons in Live in Front of a Studio Audience: Norman Lear's All in the Family and The Jeffersons.

== Life and career ==
Bennett was born in Malvern, Arkansas. She made her acting debut in theater, and her television debut on the daytime soap opera, Guiding Light. Bennett later had guest-starring roles in Roots: The Next Generations, Lou Grant, Dallas, Falcon Crest, Knots Landing, L.A. Law, and Dynasty.

Bennett had a regular role in the short-lived NBC medical drama Nightingales in 1989. She also had recurring roles in the daytime soap operas General Hospital, The Bold and the Beautiful and Sunset Beach. In prime time, she had recurring roles in Quantum Leap, In the Heat of the Night, Crisis Center and The Book of Daniel. In recent years, she appeared in Boston Legal, ER, Becker and Scandal. She played the coroner in an episode of Remington Steele January 14, 1986.

Bennett had appeared in a number of films, including Promises in the Dark (1979), How I Got Into College (1989), The Doctor (1991), Plymouth (1991), New Nightmare (1994), Foxfire (1996), The Next Best Thing (2000) and Jessabelle (2014).

From 1996 to 2003, she was head of the performance program in the School of Theater at the California Institute of the Arts.

In 2019, she portrayed the role of Mother Olivia Jefferson in a re-creation of the pilot episode of The Jeffersons in Live in Front of a Studio Audience: Norman Lear's All in the Family and The Jeffersons alongside Jamie Foxx as George, Wanda Sykes as Louise as well as Kerry Washington and Will Ferrell as Helen and Tom Willis respectively.

== Death ==
Bennett died in Los Angeles on September 12, 2021, at the age of 84.

== Filmography ==
=== Film ===
| Year | Title | Role | Notes |
|---|---|---|---|
| 1979 | Promises in the Dark | ER Nurse | |
| 1985 | The Dancing Bulrushes | Narrator | Short |
| 1989 | How I Got into College | Mrs. Cook | |
| 1994 | Wes Craven's New Nightmare | Dr. Christine Heffner | |
| 1996 | Foxfire | Judge Holifield | |
| 1997 | Leave It to Beaver | Dr. Beawoot | |
| 1999 | Unbowed | Miss Bennett | |
| 2000 | The Next Best Thing | Judge Tracey Bennett | |
| 2001 | Maple | Grandmother | Short |
| 2001 | The Sky Is Falling | Mrs. Quinn | |
| 2002 | Crazy as Hell | Mrs. Ada Barnett | |
| 2009 | Star Trek | Vulcan Midwife | Scenes cut |
| 2014 | Jessabelle | Mrs. Davis | |
| 2016 | Growing Up | Lenora | Short |
| 2021 | The Manor | Ruth | |

=== Television ===
| Year | Title | Role | Notes |
|---|---|---|---|
| 1960 | To Tell the Truth | Herself | |
| 1965–1966 | Guiding Light | Mrs. Matson | |
| 1978 | Diff'rent Strokes | Mrs. Thompson | "The Social Worker" |
| 1979 | Roots: The Next Generations | Trixie | "1.6" |
| 1979 | Friendships, Secrets and Lies | Clarissa | TV film |
| 1980 | Here's Boomer | Dr. Joyce Clarke | "Molly" |
| 1980 | The Righteous Apples | Evelyn | "Convictions" |
| 1980 | Knots Landing | Bev Tolner | "Let Me Count the Ways" |
| 1981 | The Violation of Sarah McDavid | Ms. Merriam | TV film |
| 1981 | Lou Grant | Sarah / Chaney | "Boomerang", "Wedding" |
| 1982 | Knots Landing | Kimya Haman | "Abby's Choice" |
| 1983 | Matt Houston | Lucille | "The Ghost of Carter Gault" |
| 1983 | General Hospital | Flora Johnston | 3 episodes |
| 1984 | Ernie Kovacs: Between the Laughter | Miss Deal | TV film |
| 1984 | Cat on a Hot Tin Roof | Sookey | TV film |
| 1984 | Trapper John, M.D. | Mrs. Ramsey | "School Nurse" |
| 1985 | Falcon Crest | Nurse | "Cold Comfort", "Confessions" |
| 1985 | Shadow Chasers | Dr. Frolov | "Spirit of St. Louis" |
| 1986 | St. Elsewhere | Nurse Julie Attucks | "To Tell the Truth" |
| 1986 | Simon & Simon | Wanda Tale | "The Blue Chip Stomp" |
| 1986 | Benson | Sen. Williams | "Secret Love" |
| 1986 | Foley Square | Dr. Charney | "Nobody's Perfect" |
| 1986 | Cagney & Lacey | Judge Hansen | "Family Connections" |
| 1987 | A Year in the Life | Mrs. Caldwell | "Don't I Know You from Somewhere?" |
| 1987 | The Bold and the Beautiful | Judge Madeline Collins | Recurring role |
| 1987–1988 | L.A. Law | Judge Hillary Miller Johnson | "The Douglas Fur Ball", "Hand Roll Express" |
| 1988 | Highway to Heaven | Flora | "Back to Oakland" |
| 1988 | Dynasty | Gloria Wilby | "The Trial", "The Proposal" |
| 1988 | Nightingales | Lenore Ritt, RN | TV film |
| 1988 | Roots: The Gift | Mammy May | TV film |
| 1989 | Nightingales | Head Nurse Lenore Ritt | Main role |
| 1989 | ALF | Mrs. Watson | "Happy Together" |
| 1989 | Tour of Duty | Mrs. Johnson | "Green Christmas" |
| 1990 | Mancuso, F.B.I. | Anna Sims | "Conspiracy" |
| 1990 | Amen | Judge Wilde | "Deacon's Dilemma" |
| 1990 | The Knife and Gun Club | Nurse Mary Falk | TV film |
| 1990 | Matlock | Betty Harding | "The Personal Trainer" |
| 1990–1991 | WIOU | Leonara Gates | "The Inquisition", "Labored Relations" |
| 1990–1992 | In the Heat of the Night | Ruda Gibson | "Family Matters", "Ruda's Awakening", "Last Rights" |
| 1991 | Plymouth | Debra | TV film |
| 1991 | Crazy from the Heart | Judge Sandra Farrell | TV film |
| 1991 | Quantum Leap | Ada Simpson | "Justice" |
| 1991 | Star Trek: The Next Generation | Fleet Adm. Shanthi | "Redemption II" |
| 1992 | Jake and the Fatman | Thornton | "Last Dance" |
| 1992 | Breaking the Silence | Judge Richards | TV film |
| 1992 | Quantum Leap | Marie Billings | "Trilogy: Parts 1, 2 & 3" |
| 1992 | Melrose Place | Dr. Miller | "Jake vs. Jake" |
| 1994 | Murder, She Wrote | Det. MacKenzie | "Proof in the Pudding" |
| 1994 | Once in a Lifetime | Dr. Liz Wells | TV film |
| 1994 | A Perry Mason Mystery: The Case of the Grimacing Governor | Judge Donna Andrews | TV film |
| 1996 | Arliss | Amelia Halimon | "Negotiating: It's Never Personal" |
| 1996 | ER | Phyllis | "Union Station" |
| 1996 | What Love Sees | Bessie Hays | TV film |
| 1997 | Crisis Center | Tess's Mother | Recurring role |
| 1997 | Sunset Beach | Chief Harris | Recurring role |
| 1997 | Sports Theater with Shaquille O'Neal | Grandma Williams | "4 Points" |
| 1997 | Chicago Hope | Dr. Andrea Porter | "Second Chances" |
| 1998 | Team Night Rider | Miss Barrett | "Angels in Chains" |
| 1998 | Tempting Fate | Nurse Lorenzo | TV film |
| 1999 | Early Edition | Judge A. Harding Joseph | "Pinch Hitters" |
| 2000 | Chicago Hope | Dr. Odelia Wilkes | "Letting Go" |
| 2000 | City of Angels | Hattie Brewster | "Prototype", "Weenis Between Us" |
| 2000 | Becker | Enid Connelly | "Sight Unseen" |
| 2001 | The Jennie Project | Judge | TV film |
| 2002 | Any Day Now | Mrs. Raymond | "Just the Beginning: Part 1" |
| 2002 | Days of Our Lives | Judge Ross | 1 episode |
| 2003 | Boomtown | Beatrice Rahming | "The Hole-in-the-Wall Gang" |
| 2006 | The Book of Daniel | Rainy | Regular role |
| 2006 | Boston Legal | Judge Diane Avent | "Shock and Owww!" |
| 2008 | ER | Michelle | "Owner of a Broken Heart" |
| 2008 | Grave Misconduct | Mrs. Crutch | TV film |
| 2009 | Numbers | Estelle Brown | "Shadow Markets" |
| 2010 | Community | Nana Barnes | "Basic Genealogy" |
| 2015 | Scandal | Lois | "Run" |
| 2015 | The Fosters | Iris | "Going South", "Idyllwild" |
| 2018 | Animal Kingdom | Mrs. Fullerton | "Prey" |
| 2019 | Live in Front of a Studio Audience | Mother Olivia Jefferson | Episode: Norman Lear's All in the Family and The Jeffersons |
