= Andrew Rubin =

American actor (1946–2015)

- Born: Andrew Harold Rubin; June 22, 1946; New Bedford, Massachusetts, U.S.
- Died: October 5, 2015 (aged 69); Los Angeles, California, U.S.
- Occupation: Actor
- Spouse: Lauren Rubin

Andrew Harold Rubin (June 22, 1946 – October 5, 2015) was an American actor most known for his role of George Martin in the 1984 film Police Academy.

== Early years ==
Rubin was born June 22, 1946, in New Bedford, Massachusetts to Jewish parents. His father, Simon Rubin, owned a furniture and bedding factory and his mother, Leona (née Greenstone), was an artist and international travel writer. He graduated from the American Academy of Dramatic Arts in New York City.

== Television ==
According to his obituary, Rubin began appearing in commercials in the late 1960s. He had a role in the television series Shazam! on the episode titled "The Boy Who Said 'No'", which aired October 26, 1974. He was one of the stars of Hometown, a 1985 CBS program.

Rubin originated the role of Allan Willis, the son of Tom and Helen Willis, on The Jeffersons. He introduced the character in a single episode guest appearance ("Jenny's Low") during the first season. The character reappeared as a regular for Season 5 with a new actor in the role, Jay Hammer.

== Death ==
On October 5, 2015, Rubin died of lung cancer in Los Angeles, California.

== Filmography ==
Year	Title	Role	Notes
1973	Group Marriage	Andy Rubin	
1975	Cage Without a Key	Russo	TV movie
1978	Casey's Shadow	Buddy Bourdelle	
1979	Sunnyside	Eddie Reaper	
1980	Little Miss Marker	Carter	
1980	Roughnecks	George Harris	TV movie
1983	Tell Me That You Love Me	Ronny	
1984	Police Academy	Cadet George Martín	
1986	Joe Bash	Off. Willie Smith	TV series
1988	Deadline: Madrid	Jonathan Taylor	TV movie
