= Louise Jefferson =

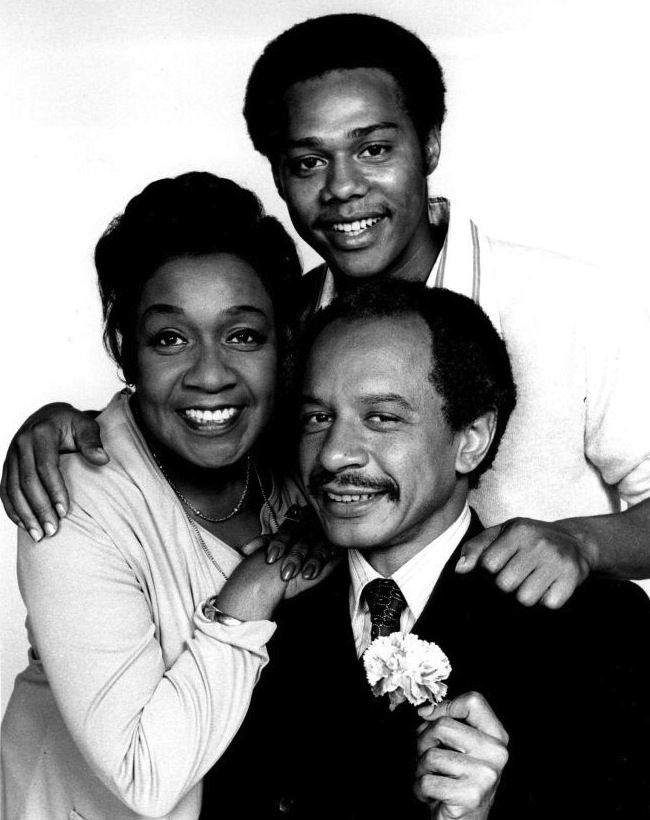
- Louise with husband George (front) and son Lionel.
- First appearance: "Lionel Moves into the Neighborhood" (on All in the Family)
- Last appearance: "Red Robins" (on The Jeffersons)
- Created by: Eric Monte
- Portrayed by: Isabel Sanford (All in the Family and The Jeffersons); Wanda Sykes (Live in Front of a Studio Audience: Norman Lear's All in the Family and The Jeffersons)

In-universe information
- Gender: Female
- Occupation: Home-maker, philanthropist
- Family: Harold Mills (father); Maxine Mills (sister)
- Spouse: George Jefferson (m.1952)
- Children: Lionel Jefferson (son)
- Relatives: Jessica Jefferson (granddaughter); Jason Mills (nephew); Julie Williams (niece); Jenny Jefferson (daughter-in-law)

Louise Mills Jefferson is a character, portrayed by Emmy Award-winning actress Isabel Sanford, who appeared first in a supporting role on the television series All in the Family and was one of the main characters in its spinoff series, The Jeffersons. The role lasted from 1971 to 1985, from her debut on All in the Family through the final episode of The Jeffersons. She was often referred to as "Weezie" by her on-screen husband, George Jefferson, and sometimes as "Mrs. J." by her neighbor Archie Bunker and later by her neighbor Harry Bentley. She was first introduced on All in the Family as a neighbor of Archie and Edith Bunker. Sanford appeared in 252 out of the 253 episodes of The Jeffersons.

== Character overview ==
Louise was similar in many respects to the character Edith Bunker in All in the Family. Both were kind-hearted and had hot-headed husbands, and they were both good friends; however, Louise was not nearly as naïve as Edith. Prior to George Jefferson's first appearance on All in the Family, Louise had to contend with the arguments between Henry Jefferson, George's brother, and Archie Bunker. While Louise recognized that Archie displayed some ignorance and bullheadedness, she saw similar traits in the Jefferson men. When Edith apologized for a poor attitude of Archie's, Louise remarked "Henry is no diplomat either". Unlike George and Henry, Louise was more favorably disposed to Archie Bunker, having visiting him when he had been hospitalized, and fondly remembering Archie during an episode of The Jeffersons when there was a flashback to All in the Family. Likewise, Archie bore no real animus towards Louise.

In the first few seasons of The Jeffersons, Louise dealt with insulting remarks from Mother Jefferson, George's mother. She was a calming influence in the household compared to George's temper tantrums and over-inflated ego. She was friends with Tom and Helen Willis, an interracial couple.

In the first episode of The Jeffersons, George insisted on hiring a maid. Both George and Louise grew up in poverty, and Louise felt it was not necessary to hire a maid. George won out and Florence Johnston (Marla Gibbs) was hired a few days a week. Over time, the role of Florence expanded and she became a live-in maid. Louise and Florence became great friends over the years while Florence and George often argued.

== Early life ==
Louise grew up in Harlem, New York. She had only a limited memory of her father and was always of the belief that he had died when she was very young. In the Season 8 episode "Louise's Father," however, George meets a man at a newsstand whom he suspects of being Louise's father. At first, the man denies his identity, saying that George is mistaken. But later, he acknowledges that he is Louise's father and decides to show up to see her. In the meantime, though, George has discovered that for Louise, finding out that her father is actually alive would not be good news. His being alive and well would mean that her father had willingly chosen to abandon her as a child, and that is a thought which she cannot bear. When her father does come to the Jeffersons' apartment, he is able to receive the satisfaction of seeing how his daughter turned out, but at George's insistence, he spares her feelings when he is introduced to her, by reverting to his original story: that George was mistaken in believing that he was Louise's father. However, in other episodes, Louise's father is portrayed as having been more involved with her. In "Louise's New Interest", she talks about her father giving her a Native American doll when he couldn't find a black one for her.

== Relatives ==
Louise had a sister, Maxine, with whom she was a constant rival when they were growing up. Louise believed that her mother favored Maxine, but it wasn't until Louise's wedding day that her mother told Louise that she was the better of the two. In her teen years, Maxine had run away from home, leaving Louise to care for their mother, causing more resentment of Maxine from Louise. In one episode of the show, George arranges for Maxine to return to New York from Paris as a surprise birthday present for Louise, only to learn that Louise hated her. During this episode, it was revealed that Maxine left home because she was pregnant, and, as a result, she introduced her son to the family. When Louise learned of this, she forgave her sister and they mended their feud. One episode of All in the Family mention is made of George Jefferson's brother-in-law who, like Archie Bunker, had fallen for a scam.

Louise also had a niece named Julie Williams (Lynne Moody), a nurse who lived in Chicago (on the short-lived series E/R).

== Depiction in other works ==
In a 1995 episode of The Fresh Prince of Bel-Air (season 5, episode 17, "Will Is From Mars," original airdate 2/20/95), Isabel Sanford and Sherman Hemsley reprise their roles as Louise and George, respectively. In one scene, Louise attacks George for calling her "Weezie" because she's sensitive about her asthma. They reappeared in the series finale, debating whether to buy the house owned by the Banks family (season 6, episode 23–24, "I, Done," original airdate 5/20/96).
