= Sherman Hemsley =

American actor (1938–2012)

- Hemsley in The Jeffersons, 1978
- Born: Sherman Alexander Hemsley; February 1, 1938; Philadelphia, Pennsylvania, U.S.
- Died: July 24, 2012 (aged 74); El Paso, Texas, U.S.
- Resting place: Fort Bliss National Cemetery
- Occupations: Actor; comedian
- Years active: 1968–2012
- Military career
- Allegiance: United States
- Branch: United States Air Force
- Service years: 1955–1959

Sherman Alexander Hemsley (February 1, 1938 – July 24, 2012) was an American actor and comedian. He was known for his roles as George Jefferson on the CBS television series All in the Family (1973–1975; 1978) and The Jeffersons (1975–1985), Deacon Ernest Frye on the NBC series Amen (1986–1991), and B. P. Richfield on the ABC series Dinosaurs. For his work on The Jeffersons, Hemsley was nominated for a Golden Globe Award and an Emmy Award. Hemsley also won an NAACP Image Award for Best Performance by an Actor in a Comedy Series or Special ("The Jeffersons") in 1982.

== Biography ==
=== Early life, education and service ===
Hemsley was born and raised in South Philadelphia by his mother, who worked in a lamp factory. Hemsley did not meet his father until he was 14. Hemsley graduated from Barrat Middle School. For high school, Hemsley attended Central High School for ninth grade and Bok Technical High School for tenth. Hemsley dropped out of school after the tenth grade and joined the United States Air Force, where he served for four years.

On leaving the Air Force, Hemsley returned to Philadelphia, where he worked for the United States Postal Service during the day while attending the Academy of Dramatic Arts at night. He then moved to New York, continuing to work for the post office during the day while working as an actor at night. He starred as Gitlow in the early 1970s Broadway musical Purlie.

=== Career ===
==== Stage ====
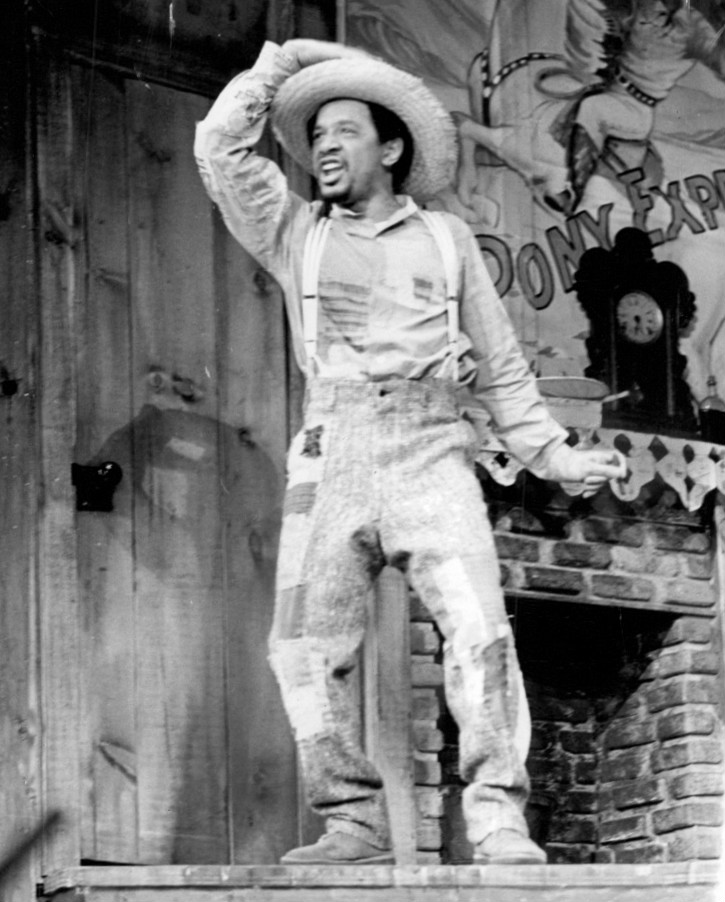
Hemsley in the Broadway musical Purlie (June 8, 1972).

Hemsley performed with local groups in Philadelphia before moving to New York to study with Lloyd Richards at the Negro Ensemble Company. Shortly after, he joined Vinnette Carroll's Urban Arts Company, appearing in But Never Jam Today, The Lottery, Old Judge Mose is Dead, Moon on a Rainbow Shawl, Step Lively Boys, Croesus, and The Witch. Hemsley made his Broadway debut in Purlie and toured with the show for a year. In summer 1972, Hemsley joined the Vinnette Carroll musical Don't Bother Me, I Can't Cope ensemble in Toronto, followed a month later in the American Conservatory Theater production at the Geary Theater. In this production, Hemsley performed the solos "Lookin' Over From Your Side" in Act I and "Sermon" in Act II.

=== Work with Norman Lear ===
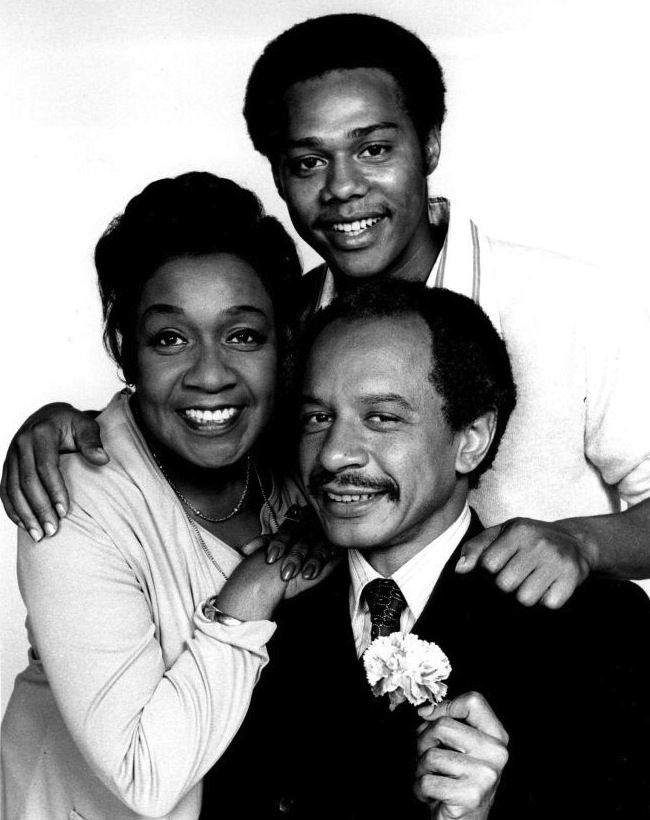
Hemsley with The Jeffersons co-stars Isabel Sanford and Mike Evans, 1974.

While Hemsley was on Broadway with Purlie, Norman Lear called him in 1971 to play the recurring role of George Jefferson in his new sitcom, All in the Family. Hemsley was reluctant to leave his theatre role; Lear told him he would hold the role open for him (another actor, Mel Stewart, played his brother during this time). Hemsley joined the cast two years later. The characters of Hemsley and co-star Isabel Sanford were occasional supporting roles in All in the Family, then were given their own spin-off, The Jeffersons, in 1975. The Jeffersons proved to be one of Lear's most successful series, enjoying a run of eleven seasons through 1985.

==== 1980s, 1990s, and 2000s ====
Hemsley continued to work steadily after the show's cancellation, largely typecast in George Jefferson–like roles. Hemsley later joined the cast of NBC's Amen in 1986 as Deacon Ernest Frye, a church deacon. The sitcom enjoyed a run of five seasons, ending in 1991. Hemsley then was a voice actor in the ABC live-action puppet series Dinosaurs, where he played Bradley P. Richfield, the boss of the main character, Earl. The series ran four seasons, ending in 1994. In 1995, Hemsley made four appearances in the sitcom Sister, Sister as Tia and Tamera Mowry's grandfather. In 1996, he had the lead role in the TV comedy series Goode Behavior, which lasted for one season.

Hemsley then cut back on his acting career, although Isabel Sanford and he occasionally appeared together in the mid to late 1990s and in the early 2000s, reprising their popular roles in guest appearances on such television series as The Fresh Prince of Bel-Air; in commercials for The Gap, Old Navy, and Denny's; and at dry cleaning conventions. He also starred with Sanford in a touring company of The Real Live Jeffersons stage show in the 1990s. Sanford and he made a cameo appearance in the film Sprung (1997). They continued to work together on occasion until Sanford's health declined prior to her death in 2004. In 2001, Hemsley appeared as a contestant on the "Celebrity Classic TV Edition" special of ABC's primetime quiz show Who Wants to Be a Millionaire and won $125,000 for his charity. Hemsley also made a voice appearance as himself in the Seth MacFarlane animated comedy Family Guy in 2005. He appeared in the film American Pie Presents: The Book of Love (2009). In 2011, he reprised his role as George Jefferson for the final time, alongside Marla Gibbs as Florence Johnston, on Tyler Perry's House of Payne. Hemsley was inducted into the Television Academy Hall of Fame in 2012.

=== Music career ===
In 1989, Hemsley, who had been a jazz keyboardist, released a single, "Ain't That a Kick in the Head." This was followed in 1992 by Dance, an album of rhythm and blues music. He appeared on Soul Train around the time of the record's release and also performed the song "Eyes in the Dark". Hemsley also was an enthusiastic fan of many 1970s progressive rock bands, including Yes (which prompted a lengthy funk rock collaboration with Jon Anderson that remains unreleased as of 2024), Gentle Giant, Gong, and Nektar.

== Personal life ==
Unlike the characters he played, Hemsley was a shy and intensely private man, described by some as reclusive. He avoided the Hollywood limelight and little of his personal life was public knowledge beyond the facts that he never married and he had no children. In 2003, however, Hemsley granted a rare video interview to the Archive of American Television where he said that his most famous role was difficult because the character was deliberately and comically rude. "[Playing George Jefferson] was hard for me, but he was the character. I had to do it."

An Out article published in 2012 after Hemsley's death suggested that Hemsley's longtime partner was Kenny Johnston. It quoted the sole beneficiary of Hemsley's estate – Flora Enchinton – who said she had been Hemsley's manager for more than two decades, during which she lived with Hemsley and Johnston.

In 2025, fellow Jeffersons cast member Damon Evans stated in an article in The Advocate that he knew Hemsley was, like himself, gay, and that it was an open secret: "We cruised the same places, went to the same parties. The same bars. But it wasn't something we talked about ... He was dating a Puerto Rican guy. They lived together. His boyfriend came to our tapings ... I just didn't understand why it needed to be hidden for so long, but Sherman really didn't like being in the spotlight."

== Death ==
Hemsley died at his home in El Paso, Texas on July 24, 2012, at age 74 due to superior vena cava syndrome, a complication associated with lung and bronchial carcinomas. He had a malignant mass in one of his lungs for which chemotherapy and radiation had been recommended, according to the El Paso County Texas Medical Examiner's report.

=== Aftermath ===
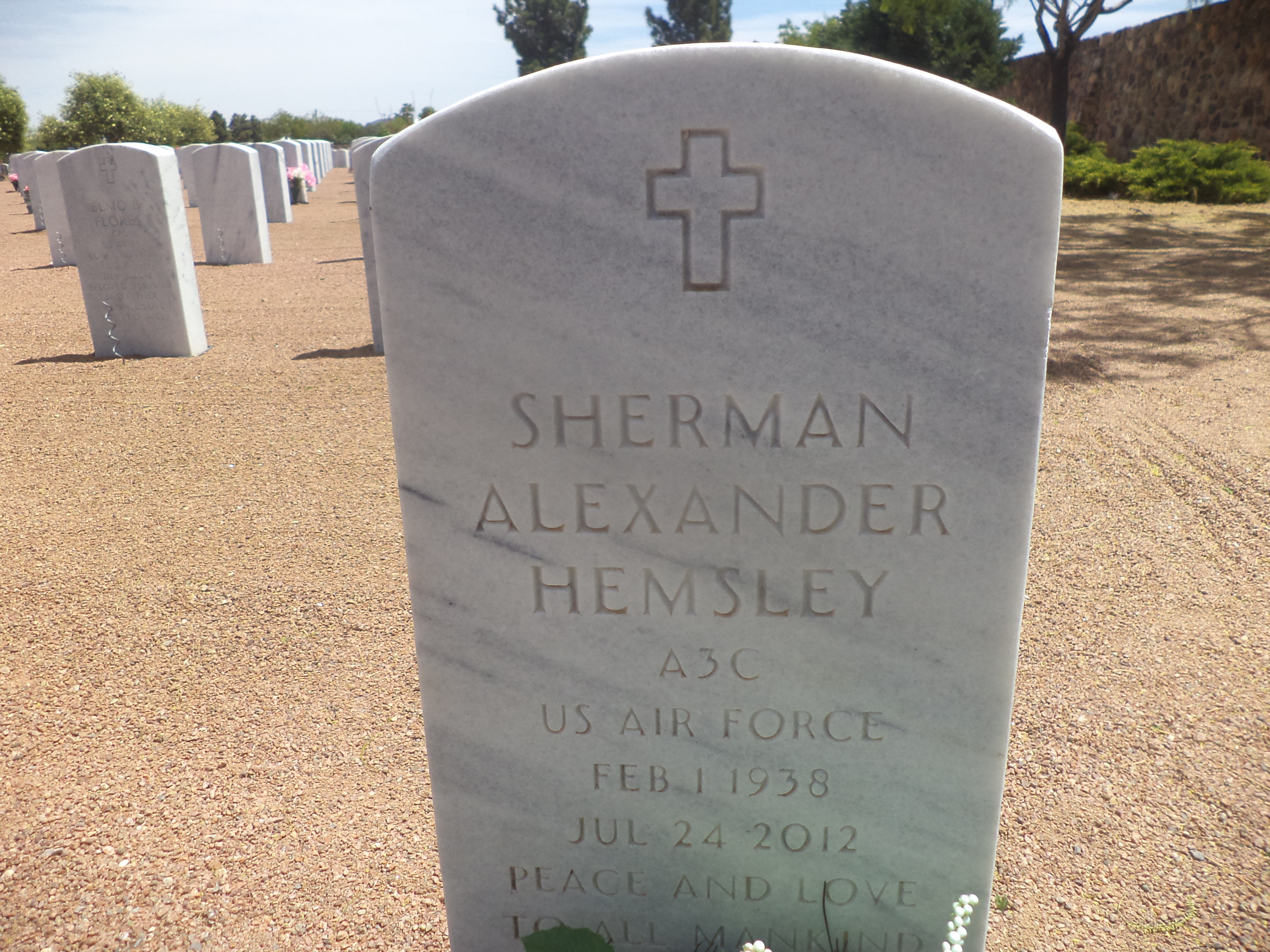
Hemsley grave marker at Fort Bliss National Cemetery in El Paso Texas, 2016.

On August 28, 2012, an El Paso news anchor interviewed Enchinton, who said that Hemsley never mentioned any relatives. "Some people come out of the woodwork – they think Sherman, they think money", Enchinton said. "But the fact is that I did not know Sherman when he was in the limelight. I met them when they [Hemsley and Johnston] came running from Los Angeles with not one penny, when there was nothing but struggle."

A Philadelphia man named Richard Thornton claimed to be Hemsley's brother and the true heir to his estate. After contesting the will, Thornton halted progress on funeral arrangements, and as a result, Hemsley's body remained at the San Jose Funeral Home in El Paso and unburied for months. On November 9, 2012, the legal battle over Hemsley's body ended when Judge Patricia Chew ruled in favor of Enchinton. A military funeral was planned for Hemsley. He was interred at Fort Bliss National Cemetery in his adopted hometown of El Paso.

== Filmography ==
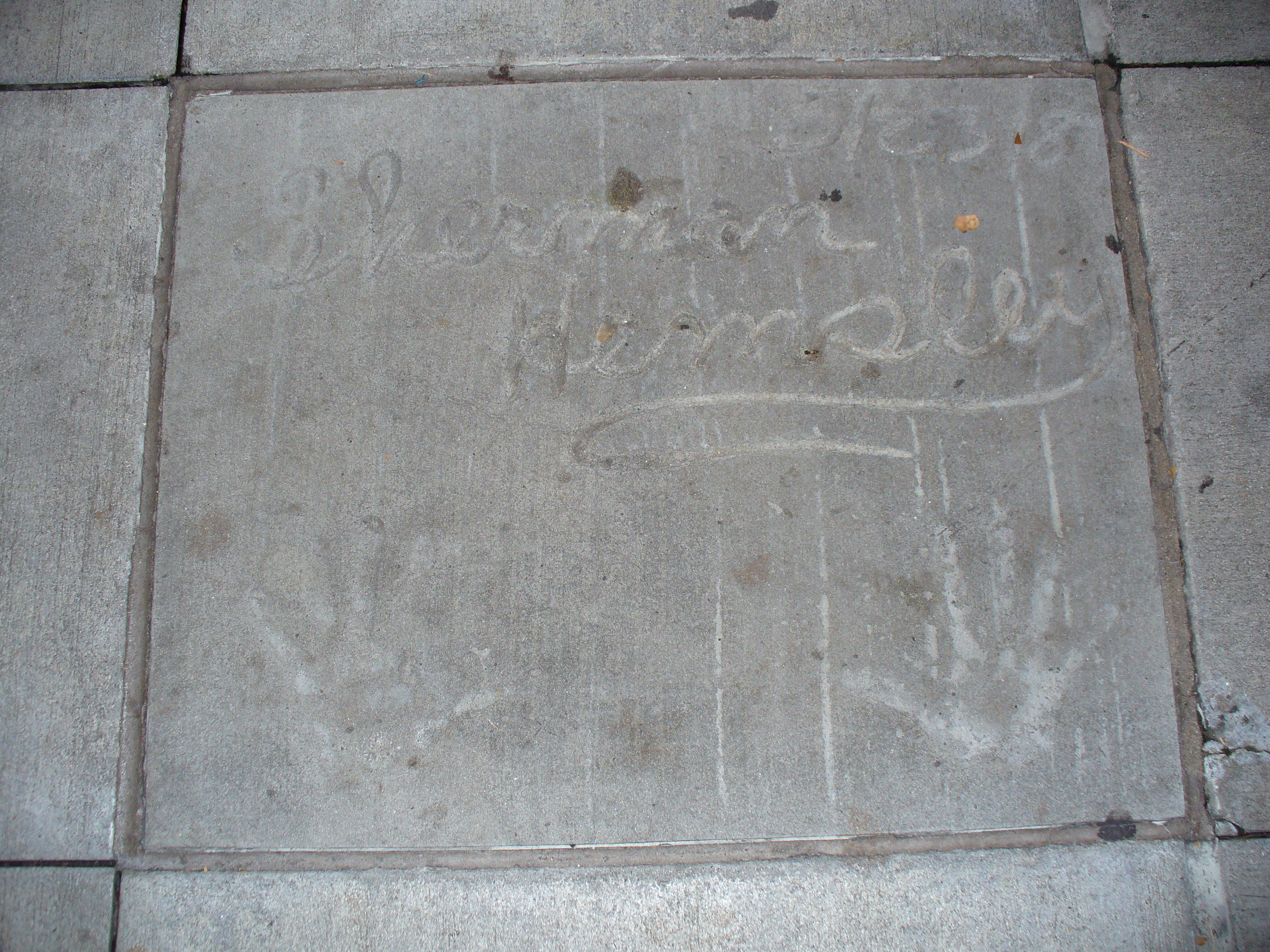
Hemsley's handprints in front of Hollywood Hills Amphitheater at Walt Disney World's Disney's Hollywood Studios theme park, 2007.

=== Film ===
- Love at First Bite (1979) - Reverend Mike (film debut)
- Stewardess School (1986) - Mr. Buttersworth
- Ghost Fever (1986) - Buford/Jethro
- Club Fed (1990) - Reverend James Dooley
- Mr. Nanny (1993) - Burt Wilson
- Home of Angels (1994) - Buzzard Bracken
- The Misery Brothers (1995) - Rev. Scheister
- A Christmas Journey Home (1996) - Steve
- Sprung (1997) - Earl
- Casper: A Spirited Beginning (1997) - Harvey
- Senseless (1998) - James
- Mafia! (1998) - George Jefferson (uncredited)
- Screwed (2000) - Chip Oswald
- Hanging in Hedo (2008) - Henry Hunter
- For The Love of a Dog (2008) - George O'Donnell
- American Pie Presents: The Book of Love (2009) - Pastor Reggie Johnston (final film role)

=== Television ===
- All in the Family (1973–1975; 1978) - George Jefferson
- The Jeffersons (1975–1985) - George Jefferson
- The Love Boat (1977–1983) - Henry Bullard / Maurice Marshall
- The Donny & Marie Show (1978?) - Guest star
- The Incredible Hulk (1979, season 2 episode 18 "No Escape") - Robert
- Pink Lady (1980; guest-starred) - Himself
- Purlie (1981, TV Movie) - Gitlow Judson
- Fantasy Island (November 7, 1981) (Season 5, Episode 5, "Mr. Nobody/La Liberatora") - Charlie Atkins
- E/R (1984) (guest spots as Nurse Julie Williams' uncle) - George Jefferson
- The Twilight Zone (1985, Episode: "I of Newton") - Sam
- Alice in Wonderland (1985, TV Movie) - Mouse
- Candid Camera (1986) - Dick Sherman
- Amen (1986–1991) - Deacon Ernest Frye
- 227 (1988, guest starred in the episode "The Big Deal") - Thurmond Fox
- Camp Cucamonga (1990, TV Movie) - Herbert Himmel
- Dinosaurs (1991–1994) - B.P. Richfield (voice)
- The Fresh Prince of Bel-Air (1992–1996, guest starred) - Judge Carl Robertson / George Jefferson
- Designing Women (1993, in the episode "Wedding Redux") - Mr. Ray Toussant
- In Living Color (February 14, 1993) - guest appearance as George Jefferson in sketch, Lashawn: Dry Cleaners
- Burke's Law (1994, in "Who Killed the Legal Eagle?") - Judge J.R. Powell
- Lois & Clark: The New Adventures of Superman (1994, in the Episode "Seasons Greedings") - Winslow Schott
- The Magic School Bus (1995, guest starred, in "Revving Up") - Mr. Junkett
- The Wayans Bros. (1995, episode "It's Shawn! It's Marlon! It's The Superboys!") - Mr. Stone
- Sister, Sister (1995, guest spots) - Grandpa Campbell
- Family Matters (1995) - Captain Marion Savage, Carl's superior
- Goode Behavior (1996–1997) - Willie Goode
- Martin (1996) - Mr. Washington
- All That (1997; guest starred in two episodes) - Doctor
- The Secret Diary of Desmond Pfeiffer (1998, guest starred in "Up, Up and Away") - Union Spy
- The Hughleys (1999–2000) - James Williams
- All That (1997) - Good Burger food critic / Mr. Gurman
- Figure It Out (1999) (Guest Panelist)
- City Guys (1999) (episode "Face the Music") - Slick Willy
- Up, Up, and Away (2000, TV Movie) - Edward Marshall / Steel Condor
- Mister Ed (2004, TV Movie) - Mr. Ed (voice)
- Family Guy (2005, in a voice cameo,"The Father, the Son, and the Holy Fonz") - Himself
- The Surreal Life (2006, cast member in 2006)
- Clunkers (2011, 8 episodes) - Boss
- Tyler Perry's House of Payne (2011, guest starred) - George Jefferson
- One Love (2014) - Grandpa Roy (final television role, filmed 2012)

== Discography ==
- Dance (1992)
