= Live in Front of a Studio Audience =

Live performances of classic sitcom episodes

- Genre: Sitcom
- Created by: Jimmy Kimmel
- Based on: All in the Family by Norman Lear; The Jeffersons by Don Nicholl, Michael Ross, and Bernie West; Good Times by Eric Monte and Mike Evans; The Facts of Life by Dick Clair and Jenna McMahon; Diff'rent Strokes by Jeff Harris and Bernie Kukoff
- Directed by: Andy Fisher; James Burrows (segments); Pamela Fryman (segments)
- Presented by: Norman Lear; Jimmy Kimmel
- Opening theme: "Those Were the Days" performed by Woody Harrelson and Marisa Tomei (All in the Family); "Movin' on Up" performed by Jennifer Hudson (The Jeffersons); "Good Times" performed by Anthony Anderson and Patti LaBelle (Good Times); "The Facts of Life" performed by Lisa Whelchel (The Facts of Life); "Diff'rent Strokes" performed by Shawn Stockman & Wanya Morris (of Boyz II Men) (Diff'rent Strokes)
- Country of origin: United States
- Original language: English
- No. of episodes: 6 (3 specials)

Production
- Executive producers: James Burrows (December 18, 2019); Will Ferrell; Jimmy Kimmel; Norman Lear; Adam McKay (May 22, 2019); Brent Miller; Justin Theroux; Kerry Washington (December 18, 2019)
- Production locations: Sony Pictures Studios; Culver City, California
- Cinematography: Gary Baum
- Running time: 90 minutes
- Production companies: Sony Pictures Television Studios; Act III Communications; Kimmelot; Smoking Baby Productions; Gary Sanchez Productions; Simpson Street (December 18, 2019)

Original release
- Network: ABC
- Release: May 22, 2019 – December 7, 2021

Live in Front of a Studio Audience (Note: Known as Live in Front of a Studio Audience: Norman Lear's All in the Family and The Jeffersons for its first installment, then Live in Front of a Studio Audience: All in the Family and Good Times for its second installment.) is a series of live television specials that was first broadcast by ABC on May 22, 2019. Conceptualized and hosted by Jimmy Kimmel, the specials feature all-star casting for live recreations of sitcom episodes of various television shows created by companies run by the renowned producer, Norman Lear, that originally aired in the 1970s and 1980s.

The specials are co-produced by Norman Lear's Act III Communications, Kimmel's Kimmelot, and Will Ferrell's Gary Sanchez Productions — in association with Sony Pictures Television Studios (owner of the rights to the original series) via the ownership of the Embassy Television library (the original producer of All in the Family and its spin-offs The Jeffersons and Good Times).

The first special recreated two episodes involving George Jefferson (played by Jamie Foxx), with All in the Family represented by "Henry's Farewell" (the character's on-screen debut) and "A Friend in Need" (the first episode of The Jeffersons). The first special was seen by 10.4 million viewers; a repeat was seen by 2.49 million viewers.

The second special was broadcast on December 18, 2019, and recreated another All in the Family episode and an episode of Good Times.

The third special recreated The Facts of Life third-season episode "Kids Can Be Cruel" and Diff'rent Strokes' first-season episode "Willis' Privacy". It aired on December 7, 2021.

== History ==
All in the Family is about a working-class white family living in Queens, New York. Its patriarch is Archie Bunker (Carroll O'Connor), an outspoken, narrow-minded man. Archie's wife Edith (Jean Stapleton) is sweet and understanding, though somewhat naïve and uneducated; her husband sometimes disparagingly calls her "dingbat." Their only child, daughter Gloria (Sally Struthers), is generally kind and good-natured like her mother, but displays traces of her father's stubbornness and temper; unlike them, however, she is a feminist. Gloria is married to college student Michael Stivic (Rob Reiner) – referred to as "Meathead" by Archie – whose values are likewise influenced and shaped by the counterculture of the 1960s. The two couples represent the real-life clash of values between the Greatest Generation and baby boomers. For much of the series, the Stivics live in the Bunkers' home to save money, providing abundant opportunity for them to irritate each other. The show is set in the Astoria section of Queens, with the vast majority of scenes taking place in the Bunkers' home at 704 Hauser Street. Occasional scenes take place in other locations, especially during later seasons, such as Kelsey's Bar, a neighborhood tavern where Archie spends a good deal of time and which he eventually purchases, and the Stivics' home after Mike and Gloria move to the house next door. The house seen in the opening is at 89-70 Cooper Avenue near the junction of the Glendale, Forest Hills, and Rego Park sections of Queens. Supporting characters represent the demographics of the neighborhood, especially the Jeffersons, a black family, who live in the house next door in the early seasons.

The Jeffersons focuses on George and Louise Jefferson, an African-American couple who have been able to move from a working-class Queens neighborhood to a luxury apartment building on the East Side of Manhattan owing to the success of George's dry-cleaner chain. The show was launched as the second spin-off of All in the Family, on which the Jeffersons had been the neighbors of Archie and Edith Bunker. The show was the creation of Norman Lear. The Jeffersons eventually evolved into more of a traditional sitcom but did reference such issues as alcoholism, racism, suicide, gun control, being transgender, and adult illiteracy. The epithets "nigger" and "honky" were used occasionally, especially during the earlier seasons.

Good Times focuses on James and Florida Evans and their three children living in a housing project in inner-city Chicago with their exuberant neighbor and Florida's best friend Willona Woods. The series was a spin-off of Maude (which was itself a spin-off of All in the Family). Florida was employed as Maude Findlay's housekeeper in Tuckahoe, New York, and James (named "Henry") was employed as a New York City firefighter. When Florida and Henry moved to Good Times, the producers decided to change the characters' history to fit a new series that was well into development rather than start from scratch to create a consistent starring vehicle. Henry's name was changed to James, and there was no mention of anything connected to Maude. Good Times was set in a traditional sitcom format, but dealt with serious issues of poverty, social class, racism, addiction, alcoholism, gang violence, gun violence, child abuse, homelessness, and politics. Controversially, in later seasons the show increasingly focused on the popular character of J.J., the Evans' oldest son, whom some critics, including the actors who played his parents, considered a negative stereotype of African-Americans.

The Facts of Life is a spin-off of Diff'rent Strokes in which the Drummonds' housekeeper, Mrs. Garrett, moves to Peekskill, New York to work as the housemother of a dormitory at Eastland, an all-girls boarding school. Unusually for a spin-off, it premiered less than a year after the series that spawned it. Owing to its setting in a dormitory, the first season features a large cast of students, but in the second season, the cast was streamlined substantially and for the majority of the show's run, it focuses on Mrs. Garrett and four core girls: spoiled Blair, naive Natalie, gossipy Tootie, and tough Jo. The show's school-based setting combined with its long run necessitated a thematic shift in season five in which Mrs. Garrett leaves Eastland to open a gourmet food shop in Peekskill, and the four core girls come to live with her behind the shop as they attend different schools and work for Mrs. Garrett.

Diff'rent Strokes is about a pair of working-class African-American children from Harlem, New York, Arnold and Willis Jackson, who are taken in and eventually adopted by wealthy white industrialist Philip Drummond upon the death of their mother, Mr. Drummond's housekeeper. Other members of the Drummond household include Mr. Drummond's teenage daughter, Kimberly, and his new housekeeper, Edna Garrett; Mrs. Garrett departed for her own series midway through the second season and was succeeded by two other housekeepers. Early episodes deal with the culture shock of two children of limited means suddenly being vaulted into high society, but these themes were largely dropped in later seasons as the Jackson brothers became used to their privileged life on Park Avenue and began referring to Mr. Drummond as "Dad." Nonetheless, the sitcom continued to address serious issues such as drug abuse, child sexual abuse, disabilities and eating disorders. In doing so, it became one of the era's best-known purveyors of the very special episode.

== Cast ==
Co-hosts

- Norman Lear
- Jimmy Kimmel

Guest stars

- Martin Short as Himself – performing the theme song from The Facts of Life in the second special
- Ja'Net DuBois, Jimmie Walker, and Bern Nadette Stanis as Themselves – cast members on the original series of Good Times
- Todd Bridges – original cast member of Diff'rent Strokes
- Lisa Whelchel, Mindy Cohn and Kim Fields – original cast members of The Facts of Life

All in the Family

- Woody Harrelson as Archie Bunker (also performing the theme song, "Those Were the Days")
- Marisa Tomei as Edith Bunker (also performing the theme song, "Those Were the Days")
- Ellie Kemper as Gloria Stivic
- Ike Barinholtz as Mike "Meathead" Stivic
- Anthony Anderson as Henry Jefferson (for "Henry's Farewell")
- Jamie Foxx as George Jefferson (for "Henry's Farewell")
- Sean Hayes as Frank Lorenzo (for "Henry's Farewell")
- Kevin Bacon as Pinky Peterson (for "The Draft Dodger")
- Jesse Eisenberg as David Brewster (for "The Draft Dodger")
- Justina Machado as Teresa Betancourt (for "The Draft Dodger")

The Jeffersons

- Jamie Foxx as George Jefferson
- Wanda Sykes as Louise Jefferson
- Kerry Washington as Helen Willis
- Will Ferrell as Tom Willis
- Marla Gibbs as Florence Johnston
- Fran Bennett as Mother Olivia Jefferson
- Jovan Adepo as Lionel Jefferson
- Amber Stevens West as Jenny Willis Jefferson
- Stephen Tobolowsky as Harry Bentley
- Jackée Harry as Diane Stockwell
- Jennifer Hudson as Herself (performing the theme song, "Movin' On Up")

Good Times

- Andre Braugher as James Evans Sr.
- Viola Davis as Florida Evans
- Tiffany Haddish as Willona Woods
- Jay Pharoah as James "J.J." Evans Jr.
- Corinne Foxx as Thelma Evans
- Asante Blackk as Michael Evans
- John Amos as Fred Davis
- Jharrel Jerome as Jimmy Pierson
- Anthony Anderson as Himself and Patti LaBelle as Herself (performing the self-titled theme song)

The Facts of Life

- Ann Dowd as Edna Garrett
- Jennifer Aniston as Blair Warner
- Gabrielle Union as Tootie Ramsey
- Allison Tolman as Natalie Green
- Kathryn Hahn as Jo Polniaczek
- Will Arnett as Dink Lockwood
- Jason Bateman as Tim Holifield
- Jon Stewart as Carl "Rocky" Price
- Noah Lapook
- Lisa Whelchel as Herself (performing the self-titled theme song)

Diff'rent Strokes

- John Lithgow as Mr. Philip Drummond
- Kevin Hart as Arnold Jackson
- Damon Wayans as Willis Jackson
- Ann Dowd as Edna Garrett
- Snoop Dogg as Vernon
- Shawn Stockman and Wanya Morris (from Boyz II Men) as Themselves (performing the self-titled theme song)

== Episodes recreated ==
Series	Title	Directed by	Written by	Original release date	Original episode no.
All in the Family	"Henry's Farewell"	Bob LaHendro and John Rich	Don Nicholl	October 20, 1973	Season 4 Episode 6
The Bunkers and the Jeffersons have a farewell party for Henry, where Archie incites another argument.
The Jeffersons	"A Friend in Need"	Jack Shea	Story by : Barry Harman & Harve Brosten; Teleplay by : Don Nicholl, Michael Ross, Bernie West, Barry Harman & Harve Brosten	January 18, 1975	Season 1 Episode 1
When they experience growing pains in their posh new digs, George demands that Louise hire her friend as their maid. However, when the couple ends up hiring sassy maid Florence instead, George and Weezy learn you can "move on up" without looking down upon others.
Good Times	"The Politicians"	Herbert Kenwith	Jack Elinson & Norman Paul	November 4, 1975	Season 3 Episode 9
A feud erupts in the Evans' household when James and J.J. take the side of Alderman Fred Davis during his attempt at re-election while Florida, Thelma and Willona take the side of his young opponent. It seems Davis is a shyster who gets nothing done in the neighborhood, which is why she cannot believe James would back such a loser.
All in the Family	"The Draft Dodger"	Paul Bogart	Jay Moriarty and Mike Milligan	December 25, 1976	Season 7 Episode 15
The Bunkers have Christmas dinner with a friend of Archie's whose son died in the Vietnam war and a friend of Mike's who's a draft dodger.
The Facts of Life	"Kids Can Be Cruel"	Asaad Kelada	Jerry Mayer	March 17, 1982	Season 3 Episode 20
A vengeful Natalie is determined to get even with insensitive Blair, but she unwittingly entangles an innocent victim in her scheme.
Diff'rent Strokes	"Willis' Privacy"	Herbert Kenwith	Alan Rosen & Fred Rubin	February 23, 1979	Season 1 Episode 17
Willis is tired of having Arnold hang around him all the time, so he goes back to Harlem to get away from him - possibly for good.

== Production ==
The first special was announced on April 19, 2019 (which aired May 22). Jimmy Kimmel deemed All in the Family and The Jeffersons as his favorite TV series of all time, and stated: "the fact that a group of Oscar winners eagerly agreed to play these iconic characters is a testament to the greatness of these shows and their creator, Norman Lear." On May 10, 2019, it was announced that Anthony Anderson, Ike Barinholtz, and Sean Hayes would be part of the cast.

Live in Front of a Studio Audience was broadcast from the Sony Pictures Studios lot in Culver City, California. Many of the details regarding the special, including which episodes would be performed, guest stars, and other aspects, were kept as surprises to encourage viewership. Lear remarked that "the whole thing was Jimmy's idea", and that the two shows' relevance remained the same in the current political climate, explaining that "seriously, the most amazing thing is listening to these two shows where we agreed word for word — we would not change a word, and nothing has been changed". Lear also hoped that the special could become a larger franchise in its own right.

Justina Machado was originally announced as playing Florence Johnston; however, during the live broadcast, original The Jeffersons cast member Marla Gibbs made a surprise appearance to reprise her role as Florence. Veteran actress Fran Bennett portrayed Mother Jefferson. The original episodes aired between 1973 and 1976 on CBS, respectively.

A second special was announced on November 5, 2019 (which aired December 18), featuring episodes of All in the Family and Good Times. On December 11, 2019, it was announced that Harrelson, Tomei, Kemper, and Barinholtz would reprise their All in the Family roles, and would be joined by Kevin Bacon, Jesse Eisenberg, and the previously announced Machado in yet to be revealed roles. It was also revealed that Anderson, who previously played Henry Jefferson in the first special, and Patti LaBelle would sing the Good Times theme song. The following day, the special's Good Times cast was announced: Viola Davis as Florida Evans, with Andre Braugher as James Evans, Jay Pharaoh as J.J. Evans, Asante Blackk as Michael Evans, Corinne Foxx as Thelma Evans, Tiffany Haddish as Willona Woods, and Jharrel Jerome in another yet-to-be revealed role. ABC also announced that it would air special "retro" promos for its current programming during the broadcast, which were modeled upon ABC's on-air presentation from the mid-1970s and early to mid 80s. Several ABC stations similarly planned to air their own throwback promos for local newscasts during the special, such as network owned-and-operated stations WTVD-TV and WLS-TV. The original broadcast was occasionally interrupted by ABC News special reports of updates on the impeachment of Donald Trump. Nevertheless, the final half hour tied with the Survivor season finale for the number 2 spot, losing to only the season finale of The Masked Singer.

A third special was announced on November 18, 2021, for the principal cast of the Diff'rent Strokes reenactment, and the cast of The Facts of Life reenactment was announced on November 29. It aired December 7.

On January 11, 2022, ABC Entertainment president Craig Erwich confirmed that there would be more installments of Live in Front of a Studio Audience.

== Reception ==
=== Critical response ===
Film critic Caroline Framke of Variety felt that "with meticulous attention to set detail and wig shapes, ABC's live staging of 'Henry's Farewell' and 'A Friend in Need' managed to feel both like an artifact of a nostalgic past and the urgent present", noting that Archie had "retained his notoriously ugly streaks of sexism and racism", while the word "nigger" had to be censored from the Jeffersons episode due to current broadcast standards. Framke similarly noted that "some of the punchlines reveal[ed] their age, but as Lear warned us ahead of time, far more hit close to home" (especially if one were to, for example, "swap out every Nixon mention for Trump"), and that "the deja vu does tend to create an extra depressing level to the proceedings." She felt that most of the starring roles were trying to "impersonate" their original actors with mixed results (also noting that Jamie Foxx had broken character to point out his flubbed line, blurting out that "[everyone's] sitting at home thinking their TV is messed up"), but that Marisa Tomei "stole just about every scene", and that they were backed by a supporting cast that "more often than not, have had ample experience on their own comedies borne of the Lear tradition". She concluded that "TV could frankly do a whole lot worse than gathering talented performers to tackle smart, topical comedy with such visceral joy that they're practically vibrating off the screen. That the material remains so stubbornly timely is a bonus — and a warning."

=== Viewership and ratings ===
The first special was seen by 10.4 million viewers, with a 1.8 rating among viewers 18–49, making it the most-watched program of the night. It ranked #2 for the week in viewers, and #1 for the week in the 18-49 demographic. The live special was followed by a half-hour retrospective on the two shows, All About All in the Family & The Jeffersons (seen by 7.9 million), and the series finale of Whiskey Cavalier (3.64 million). The special also gave ABC its most watched season-closing Wednesday since 2007.

An encore presentation of the special and retrospective were aired on May 25, 2019, with a 0.4/2 rating/share and 2.49 million viewers.

The second special was seen by 5.8 million viewers, with a 1.1 share among viewers 18–49. Despite the massive drop in viewership, the special scored ABC's biggest audience on the Wednesday before Christmas since 2009.

The third special was seen by 4.8 million viewers, with a .96 share among viewers 18–49. Despite the decline in viewership, the special scored the best ratings of the evening.

=== Accolades ===
Award wins and nominations for Live in Front of a Studio Audience
Year	Award	Category	Nominee(s)	Result	Ref.
2019	Primetime Emmy Awards	Outstanding Variety Special (Live)	Norman Lear, Jimmy Kimmel, Adam McKay, Justin Theroux, Will Ferrell, Brent Miller and Eric Cook	Won	
2019	Primetime Emmy Awards	Outstanding Directing for a Variety Special	James Burrows and Andy Fisher	Nominated	
2019	Primetime Emmy Awards	Outstanding Production Design for a Variety Special	Bernard Vyzga, Richard Rohrer and Ron Olsen	Nominated	
2020	Artios Awards	Live Television Performance – Variety or Sketch Comedy	Marc Hirschfeld, Geralyn Flood and Katrina Wandel George	Won	
2020	Black Reel Television Awards	Outstanding Actor, TV Movie/Limited Series	Andre Braugher	Nominated	
2020	Black Reel Television Awards	Outstanding Actress, TV Movie/Limited Series	Viola Davis	Nominated	
2020	Critics' Choice Television Awards	Best Comedy Special	Live in Front of a Studio Audience: Norman Lear’s All in the Family and The Jeffersons	Won	
2020	Directors Guild of America Awards	Outstanding Directorial Achievement in Variety/Talk/News/Sports – Specials	James Burrows and Andy Fisher	Won	
2020	Make-Up Artists and Hair Stylists Guild Awards	Television Special, One Hour or More Live Program Series or Movie Made for Television – Best Period and/or Character Make-Up	Patty Bunch and Farah Bunch	Nominated	
2020	Make-Up Artists and Hair Stylists Guild Awards	Television Special, One Hour or More Live Program Series or Movie Made for Television – Best Period and/or Character Hair Styling	Tim Burke, Pixie Schwartz and Conrad Hilton	Nominated	
2020	Primetime Emmy Awards	Outstanding Variety Special (Live)	Norman Lear, Jimmy Kimmel, Will Ferrell, Justin Theroux, Kerry Washington, James Burrows, Brent Miller and Eric Cook	Won	
2020	Primetime Emmy Awards	Outstanding Directing for a Variety Special	Pamela Fryman and Andy Fisher	Nominated	
2020	Primetime Emmy Awards	Outstanding Production Design for a Variety Special	Bernard Vyzga, Richard Rohrer and Ron Olsen	Nominated	
2020	Primetime Emmy Awards	Outstanding Technical Direction, Camerawork, Video Control for a Special	Eric Becker, Kevin Faust, Ron Hirshman, Ed Horton, Helena Jackson, Jon Purdy, Jimmy Velarde, Allen Merriweather, Greg Grouwinkel, Randy Gomez Sr. and Andrew Ansnick	Won	
2022	Art Directors Guild Awards	Excellence in Production Design for a Variety Special	Stephan Olson	Won	
2022	Primetime Emmy Awards	Outstanding Variety Special (Live)	Norman Lear, Brent Miller, Jimmy Kimmel, Will Ferrell, Justin Theroux, Kerry Washington, James Burrows, Eric Cook and James Dixon	Nominated	
2022	Primetime Emmy Awards	Outstanding Production Design for a Variety Special	Stephan Olson, Raf Lydon and Jerie Kelter	Nominated	
2022	Set Decorators Society of America Awards	Best Achievement in Décor/Design of a Variety Special	Jerie Kelter and Stephan Olson	Won	
