= Plymouth (film) =

1991 American television film

- Genre: Drama; Science Fiction
- Written by: Lee David Zlotoff
- Directed by: Lee David Zlotoff
- Theme music composer: Brad Fiedel
- Country of origin: United States
- Original language: English

Production
- Executive producers: Ralph Winter; Lee David Zlotoff
- Producer: Ian Sander
- Cinematography: Hiro Narita
- Editors: O. Nicholas Brown; John W. Wheeler
- Production companies: Rai 1 (in association with) ABC Studios; Zlotoff

Original release
- Network: ABC
- Release: May 26, 1991

Plymouth is a 1991 science fiction television film that was shown on ABC Network in the same year, as a pilot for a planned series. It was created by Lee David Zlotoff and funded by the American Broadcasting Corporation, Walt Disney and Rai uno radiotelevisione, with Lockheed acting as technical advisors.

== Plot synopsis ==
Plymouth, a small timber and mining town in Oregon, was contaminated by radiation from a nearby factory run by multinational corporation UNIDAC. All the residents left in a hurried evacuation in the middle of the night. UNIDAC offered financial compensation, but what the town really wanted was to be a community again. UNIDAC also had a mining operation on the Moon extracting helium-3, but it was financially failing. The townspeople offer to take over the operation and become the first permanent settlement on the Moon on a trial basis.

Five years later, a shuttle carrying the final group of emigres approaches the Moon. Town doctor Addy Mathewson, already on the Moon, is apprehensive as she finds her birth control failed and she is in the early stages of a pregnancy. She is a widowed single mother raising eldest son Jed, leaving for his first day on a mining crew the next day, daughter Hannah, adopted daughter April and youngest son Eugene.

UNIDAC technical advisor Gil Eaton and an enthusiastically rowdy crew of miners hold a celebration as he is scheduled to finish his stay and return to Earth before joining a mission to build a space station between Earth and Mars. One of Addy’s assistants accidentally finds her sonogram and word of Addy’s pregnancy soon spreads. Gil confronts Addy, who felt Gil wants to move on rather than stay as a father. Gil finds himself ostracized by the townspeople.

The town’s residents assemble to watch and welcome the arrival of the final Plymouth residents who accepted UNIDAC’s relocation offer. Among the arrivals are Eugene’s best friend, Simon, and Addy’s uncle, Wendell, who is also the mayor of Plymouth.

Young technician Nathan Litchfield shows Hannah a “hot rod” lunar vehicle he handbuilt, with a high-speed electric drive and a rocket assist salvaged from a lander.

The town council holds a meeting to discuss the uncertainties of Addy’s pregnancy. The fetus may not survive the microgravity or reentry on the trip back to Earth and they don't want to endanger its or Addy's life. But if the child is born on the Moon, its body will never be strong enough to return to Earth, even if UNIDAC’s mining fails. The town would lose its option to return to Earth as it would be unethical to abandon the child on the Moon.

Earth controllers inform Plymouth that a very strong solar flare is en route. The residents leave the colony on the surface and head to shelters in deep lunar caverns. Eugene had been showing Simon around in shallower caverns and the boys find themselves trapped when the doors automatically seal because of the alert. Eugene reasons out that they can be shielded from the radiation by large tanks of water used for irrigation. The mining crew is unaware of the flare because of a damaged transceiver. Gil volunteers to take a lunar rover to try to warn them and take them to a semi-buried module for oxygen and shielding. Worried for her brother, Hannah tells Gil about Nathan’s “hot rod” so he can make the trip faster. He contacts the crew in time.

After the flare passes, the colony anxiously waits for the crew to return, by that time critically low on oxygen. Examination of the crew shows most are unaffected, but Gil’s friend Jimmy received a severe dose of radiation, ending his hopes of working with Gil on the space station.

Wendell talks to Gil privately. Gil wants to quit UNIDAC and stay as part of the town to raise his child with Addy. Wendell suggests he run for mayor because of his technical experience and renewed popularity due to his heroic rescue.

== Production ==
The film had a reported $8 million budget, with $3.5 million coming from ABC. After production was finished in 1990, it remained unaired for a year. Despite apparent enthusiasm from ABC executives and Walt Disney chairman Jeffrey Katzenberg, ABC declined to purchase the series, saying only, "It just didn’t meet our needs."

== Cast ==
- Dale Midkiff as Gil Eaton
- Cindy Pickett as Addy Mathewson
- Lindsay Price as April Mathewson
- Perrey Reeves as Hannah Mathewson
- Jerry Hardin as Lowell
- Richard Hamilton as Mayor Wendell Mackenzies
- James Rebhorn as Ezra
- Fran Bennett as Debra
- Sab Shimono as Hiro
- Joseph Gordon-Levitt as Simon
- Pete Conrad (Apollo 12 Mission Commander) in a cameo role
