= Joe Bash =

- Peter Boyle, right, and Andrew Rubin in Joe Bash
- Genre: Comedy drama
- Created by: Danny Arnold
- Developed by: Philip Jayson Lasker; Chris Hayward
- Starring: Peter Boyle; Andrew Rubin; DeLane Matthews; Michael Cavanaugh
- Composer: Jack Elliott
- Country of origin: United States
- Original language: English
- No. of seasons: 1
- No. of episodes: 6

Production
- Running time: 30 minutes
- Production company: Tetragram

Original release
- Network: ABC
- Release: March 28 – May 10, 1986

Joe Bash is an American comedy-drama television series that aired on ABC from March 28 to May 10, 1986. Starring Peter Boyle as a weary and embittered New York City Police Department beat cop, it was created by Danny Arnold following his sitcom Barney Miller. The production company was Tetagram Ltd., with Arnold and Chris Hayward serving as the show's executive producers. All six episodes were written by the team of Arnold, Hayward and Philip Jayson Lasker, with Arnold directing all but the fifth episode, which was directed by John Florea.

== Synopsis ==
A darkly urban comedy-drama shot without a studio audience or laugh track, the series starred Peter Boyle as a veteran, semi-corrupt cop marking time until retirement, and Andrew Rubin as his naive rookie partner, Officer Willie Smith. Series creator Danny Arnold described the lead character as "a beat patrolman with thirty years on the force. He's become so completely disillusioned and such a terrible cynic that he's written off the world." In recurring roles were DeLane Matthews as streetwalker Lorna, the only person with whom the misanthropic Bash could be even somewhat close; Val Bisoglio as Sgt. Carmine DiSalvo; Michael Cavanaugh as Lt. Pendleton; and Larry Hankin as diner-owner Stu. It was set in the 33rd Precinct in Manhattan, represented via a deliberately theatrical set reminiscent of a stage play.

As Arnold described it, "The show came out to be sort of strange. ... ABC said, 'What kind of show is this? We don't know how to sell it.' ... 'Joe Bash' is not a situation comedy and it's not a drama. It's a behavioral comedy, a comedy whose roots are in drama." He chose the name "Bash" because it "sounded like an aggressive hitter, a victim who is striking back and totally cynical because he's accomplished nothing in his life."

== Reception ==
Joe Bash won positive notices from critics. Time placed the series on the magazine's 1986 best-of list, calling it "a moody tragicomedy on loneliness. Peter Boyle was outstanding as a grumpy cop in this undeservedly short-lived series". In an earlier review, the magazine remarked on how the two lead characters would "traverse the desolate city streets and cope with the unglamorous trivia of everyday police life. ... In Boyle's sharp and unsentimental portrayal, crustiness never becomes cute, and there are echoes of authentic urban despair in the patter". The New York Times wrote favorably that, "There is no laugh track to signal the viewer as to whether Joe's misanthropy is really supposed to be funny. Joe Bash moves to its own special beat, apparently bent on demolishing every well-established cliché in sitcom territory". Lee Margulies of the Los Angeles Times wrote that the show is "not entertaining in the usual TV sense, but the intriguing premise and the captivating performance by Boyle nevertheless leaves one interested in tuning in again".

== Cast ==
- Peter Boyle as Off. Joe Bash
- Andrew Rubin as Off. Willie Smith

== Episodes ==
No.	Title	Directed by	Written by	Original release date
1	"Pilot"	Danny Arnold	Danny Arnold & Philip Jayson Lasker & Chris Hayward	March 28, 1986
Guest stars: DeLane Matthews, Val Bisoglio, Michael Cavanaugh, Robert Trebor, Hubert B. Kelly, Lisa Dunsheath
2	"Cash"	Danny Arnold	Danny Arnold & Philip Jayson Lasker & Chris Hayward	April 4, 1986
Guest stars: Val Bisoglio, Michael Cavanaugh, Dino Natali (Angelo), Larry Jenkins (Mugger), LaWanda Page, Robert Trebor, Jack Bernardi, Darrow Igus, Vincent Guastaferro, Ruth Jaroslow
3	"Feinbaum"	Danny Arnold	Danny Arnold & Philip Jayson Lasker & Chris Hayward	April 11, 1986
Guest stars: Larry Hankin, Sam Scarber (Sam), Jack Gilford (Feinbaum)
4	"Janowitz"	Danny Arnold	Danny Arnold & Philip Jayson Lasker & Chris Hayward	April 25, 1986
Guest stars: DeLane Matthews, Larry Hankin, Pat Corley (Integrity Control officer), Sully Boyar, Sy Kramer
5	"Joe's First Partner"	John Florea	Danny Arnold & Philip Jayson Lasker & Chris Hayward	May 2, 1986
Guest stars: Joseph Mascolo (Capt. Charles Taylor), Pierrino Mascarino (Irv), Marilyn Sokol (Betty), Dean Dittman, Tom Rosqui
6	"Romance"	Danny Arnold	Danny Arnold & Philip Jayson Lasker & Chris Hayward	May 10, 1986
Guest stars: DeLane Matthews, Reni Santoni (Carlos), Rosanna DeSoto (Maria)

== Other crew ==
- Associate producer: Martin J. Gold
- Director of photography: Mike Berlin
- Editor: Paul Bonat
- Production designer: Ed LaPorta
- Music: Jack Elliott
- Lighting director: Mark Palius
- Casting: Eleanor Ross (Los Angeles), David Tochterman (New York City)
- Makeup: Holly Bane
- Wardrobe: Barbara Murphy
