= George Jefferson =

Character

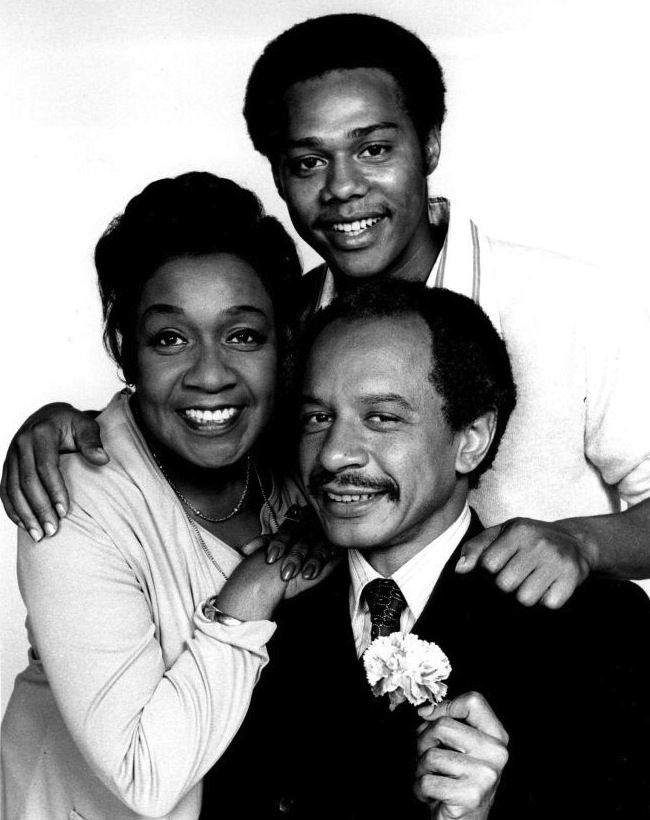
- George (front) with wife Louise and son Lionel.
- First appearance: “Henry’s Farewell" (on All in the Family)
- Last appearance: "Red Robins" (on The Jeffersons)
- Created by: Eric Monte
- Portrayed by: Sherman Hemsley (All in the Family and The Jeffersons); Jamie Foxx (Live in Front of a Studio Audience: Norman Lear's All in the Family and The Jeffersons)

In-universe information
- Occupation: Dry-cleaning business owner
- Family: William T. Jefferson (father); Olivia Jefferson (mother); Henry Jefferson (brother)
- Spouse: Louise Mills (m.1952)
- Children: Lionel Jefferson
- Relatives: Emma (aunt); Jessica Jefferson (granddaughter); Raymond Jefferson (nephew); Jenny Jefferson (daughter-in-law)

George Jefferson is a character played by Sherman Hemsley on the American television sitcoms All in the Family (1973–1975, 1978) and its spin-off The Jeffersons (1975–1985), in which he serves as the program's protagonist. He appeared in all 253 episodes of The Jeffersons.

== Character overview ==
George Jefferson was born in Harlem in 1929, an ambitious African-American entrepreneur who started and managed a successful chain of seven dry cleaning stores in New York City. The only background on the Jefferson family is that they were Alabama sharecroppers. In a very early episode, George's wife Louise makes mention of a conversation she had with George's father after she and George were married about the Jeffersons family roots. However, the show's writers later applied a retroactive change in the continuity of George's father, such that he had died when George was 9 years old. This left George to take care of his mother; therefore, George was unable to complete high school. He was a cook in the US Navy during the Korean War. He began dating Louise when they were teenagers and married her upon his discharge from the navy in 1951; by 1979 they had been married 28 years.

Before the Jeffersons' store opening, the family lived in a derelict section of Harlem. George had worked as a janitor at the Hempstead Apartments, and Louise as a housekeeper. In the third episode of All in the Family "My Aching Back", Lionel Jefferson explained that his father was able to open his cleaning store with a $3,200 ($21,467.34 in 2021) settlement after being rear-ended by a bus. Although this is later contradicted in a Season Six episode of The Jeffersons, "The First Store".

George's brother Henry Jefferson, played by veteran character actor Mel Stewart, appeared in All in the Family during the lead-up to the spin-off of The Jeffersons. That character was created only because Sherman Hemsley was starring in the Broadway musical Purlie and not yet available to take on the part of George. Once Hemsley became available and joined the cast, the character of his brother became extraneous, and as a result, Henry Jefferson never appeared on The Jeffersons. Henry's absence was attributed to his family's move to Chicago, but was mentioned one time when he had a son named Raymond (played by Gary Coleman), who came to visit his aunt Louise and uncle George in one episode of The Jeffersons.

During All in the Family, Jefferson lived in a working-class neighborhood in the borough of Queens, next door to the Bunker family, with his wife Louise (Isabel Sanford) and son Lionel (Mike Evans). During the period between 1971 and 1973, George's perpetual absence was explained as being a result of his refusal to set foot in his bigoted neighbor Archie Bunker's home, although in later episodes, relationships between Jefferson and Bunker thawed somewhat. When the spin-off series The Jeffersons began in January 1975, George and his family had moved "to a deluxe apartment in the sky" on the Upper East Side of Manhattan, owing to the success of his expanding chain of stores.

Like his neighbor Archie Bunker, George Jefferson was frequently opinionated, rude, bigoted, prone to scheming and not particularly intelligent in a scholastic sense, but still a loving, hard-working father and husband. Unlike Archie, however, George was quicker thinking, and usually cleverer. Frequently, plots in The Jeffersons revolved around George's usually dishonest schemes, which always ended in comedic failure. In the Season 3 episode "A Case of Black and White", George schemes to obtain a new client (a mixed-race couple) by inviting them and the Willises (also a mixed-race couple) to dinner. When the Willises realize that George is using them, they leave before the new client shows up. This makes George bribe Florence the maid and Ralph the doorman into pretending to be the Willises. Eventually the Willises return, and by pretending to be Florence and Ralph, they help George land the client, while trapping George into throwing them an extravagant anniversary party. In the episode "George and Jimmy" George's big-mouthed attempts to invite US President Jimmy Carter to his home as a publicity stunt backfires with George almost being arrested by the US Secret Service. In another episode "George and the Manager" George's refusal to hire any woman to be the manager of his cleaning store results in 1] A qualified African American woman refusing to work for George under any circumstances 2] a qualified white woman employee quits, so she can work at George's biggest competitor, Cunningham Cleaners 3] Louise and Mother Jefferson allied with one another against George's sexist attitude. In the last episode of the series "Red Robins", George's dishonest "business advice" to his granddaughter Jessica Jefferson and her "Red Robins" girl scout troop about selling their uneatable candy results in the girls losing a chance at a scout Jamboree and Louise Jefferson scolding George soundly.

Despite his constant self-victimization due to his background and heritage, George shows countless times in the series his immense hypocrisy and prejudices and that he possesses any form of bigotry imaginable:

- racism (against whites, like Tom Willis and countless others, Asians, mixed, like the Willises' kids, sometimes even other blacks)
- chauvinism
- sexism, specifically misogyny and aforementioned chauvinism (towards various characters in the series, including Louise)
- ageism (against Mother Jefferson's fiancé before knowing he was rich and Louise's sister and her son when he thought they were dating and didn't know yet they were related)
- lying and deception, George tries to make new customers think that he is a descendant of Thomas Jefferson and Sally Hemings!

Like Archie Bunker, however, George Jefferson's personality softened as the years passed. By The Jeffersons series finale in 1985, the frequent racism and interracial marriage plot-lines of early seasons were replaced with plots involving the Jeffersons' family life, as well as interactions with maid Florence (played by Marla Gibbs) and neighbors. George would form a grudging friendship with Tom Willis and this was primarily what prompted Hemsley to ask for the aforementioned changes, feeling George would no longer make such jokes if he and Tom were truly becoming friends.

In addition, while George nearly always appears to be stingy and insensitive, several episodes expose a generous, sentimental side that he takes pains to keep hidden from his family and friends. In the Season 4 Christmas episode "984 W. 124th Street, Apt. 5C," Louise discovers that George regularly makes anonymous donations of money and gifts to the family that now lives in the decrepit Harlem apartment where he lived as a young boy, to fulfill a childhood promise he made to himself that if he ever became wealthy, nobody in the apartment would experience an unhappy Christmas again. In the Season 9 episode "Change for a Dollar," it is revealed to the audience that George's weekly tradition of going to his first store after closing to count his money is actually an excuse to provide free dry-cleaning services to his first customer, a well-off woman who referred her friends to his store and has now fallen into poverty following the death of her husband. In the Season 9 episode "How Now Dow Jones," George persuades Florence and a group of her fellow maids to invest in a stock with him as their financial advisor; when the stock's value plummets right after George's advisor talks him out of selling it, he gives each of the maids a check out of his own pocket for the amount they would have received if he had sold the stock when he had wanted to.

As for his political affiliation, in the All in the Family episode "George and Archie Make a Deal" (1974), George briefly seeks to become a Republican council member. In the "Louise's Award" episode (1979) of The Jeffersons, he says he is a Democrat.

Hemsley appeared as George twice on The Fresh Prince of Bel-Air, appearing along with Isabel Sanford as Louise, debating whether to buy the house Will Smith's character had lived in for the last several years from his aunt and uncle in the later episode.

== All in the Family appearances ==
The following is a list of All in the Family episodes featuring George Jefferson before and during The Jeffersons.

=== Season 4 ===
- Episode 2: "Henry's Farewell"
- Episode 14: "Archie Is Cursed"
- Episode 20: "Lionel's Engagement"
- Episode 23: "Pay the Twenty Dollars"

=== Season 5 ===
- Episode 1: "The Bunkers and Inflation" (Part 1)
- Episode 3: "The Bunkers and Inflation" (Part 3)
- Episode 4: "The Bunkers and Inflation" (Part 4)
- Episode 5: "Lionel the Live-In"
- Episode 9: "Where's Archie?" (Part 2)
- Episode 10: "The Longest Kiss"
- Episode 12: "George and Archie Make a Deal"
- Episode 13: "Archie's Contract"
- Episode 17: "The Jeffersons Move on Up"
- Episode 24: "Mike Makes His Move"

=== Season 8 ===
- Episode 22: "Mike's New Job"

== Cultural impact ==
The lingering cultural impact of the George Jefferson character is such that Michelle Obama, the wife of then-presidential candidate Barack Obama, referenced George Jefferson in a June 2008 interview with the New York Times. Referring to an unfounded rumor discussed by a blogger that she had once used the word "whitey" in a speech, Michelle Obama told the Times: "You are amazed sometimes at how deep the lies can be . . . I mean, ‘whitey’? That's something that George Jefferson would say."
