= Damon Evans (actor) =

American actor (born 1949)

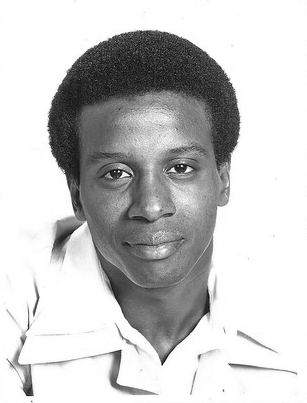
- Evans in 1977
- Born: November 24, 1949 (age 76); Baltimore, Maryland, U.S.
- Occupation: Actor
- Years active: 1975–2000

Damon Evans (born November 24, 1949) is an American actor and singer best known as the second of two actors who portrayed Lionel Jefferson on the CBS sitcom The Jeffersons. He also portrayed the young Alex Haley (ages 17–25) in the ABC television miniseries Roots: The Next Generations.

== Early life and education ==
Born in Baltimore, Evans attended the Interlochen Center for the Arts on a Reader's Digest Scholarship. After graduation, he attended the Boston Conservatory of Music. While in Boston, he appeared in productions of Two If by Sea, Hair, and The Corner at the Theatre Company of Boston.

== Career ==
His Off-Broadway credits include performances in A Day in the Life of Just About Everyone, Bury the Dead (for the Urban Arts Corp), and Love Me, Love My Children. He made his Broadway debut in The Me Nobody Knows. Other Broadway credits include Via Galactica and Lost in the Stars. He also toured as Judas and Jesus Christ in the authorized concert version of the musical Jesus Christ Superstar. He appeared in the Broadway musical Don't Bother Me, I Can't Cope.

In the late 1980s, Evans appeared in Trevor Nunn's Glyndebourne Festival production of the George Gershwin opera, Porgy and Bess, and again in the 1993 television adaptation of that production. In addition to Evans and other noted performers, this British production of Gershwin's 'American folk opera' featured the Glyndebourne Chorus and the London Philharmonic, both conducted by Sir Simon Rattle. Evans played Sportin' Life, a role originated by John W. Bubbles and originally written for famed 1920s and 1930s jazz bandleader and singer Cab Calloway.

== Personal life ==
Evans is gay and was present at the 1969 Stonewall Riots.

Evans posthumously outed Jeffersons castmate Sherman Hemsley in a 2025 interview in The Advocate, saying his being gay was an open secret: "We cruised the same places, went to the same parties. The same bars. But it wasn't something we talked about...He was dating a Puerto Rican guy. They lived together. His boyfriend came to our tapings...I just didn't understand why it needed to be hidden for so long, but Sherman really didn't like being in the spotlight."

== Filmography ==
=== Film ===
Year	Title	Role	Notes
1985	Turk 182	Subway Cop	
2000	Going the Distance	Adoptive Parent	

=== Television ===
Year	Title	Role	Notes
1975–1979	The Jeffersons	Lionel Jefferson	72 episodes
1979	Roots: The Next Generations	Alex Haley (ages 17–28)	Episode: "Part VI (1939-1950)"
1985	Saturday Night Live	Subway traveller	Episode: "Alex Karras/Tina Turner"
1993	American Playhouse	Sportin' Life	Episode: "The Gershwins', Porgy & Bess"
2000	Third Watch	Moses	Episode: "Spring Forward, Fall Back"
