= Lionel Jefferson =

Fictional character on American sitcoms All in the Family and The Jeffersons

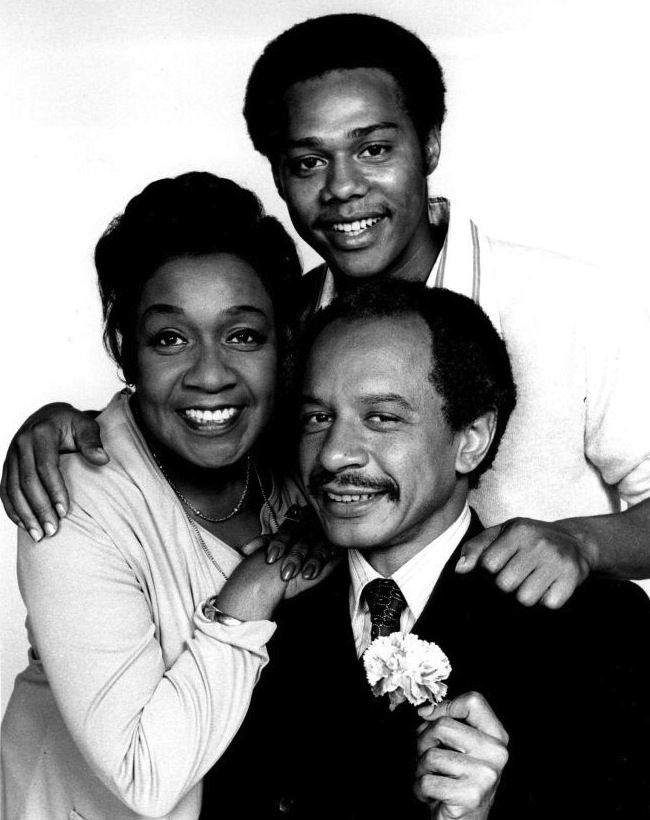
- Lionel (top) with parents, George and Louise Jefferson.
- First appearance: "Meet the Bunkers" (All in the Family)
- Last appearance: "Sayonara, Pt. 2" (The Jeffersons)
- Portrayed by: D'Urville Martin (two unaired pilots); Mike Evans (1971–1975, 1979–1982, 1985); Damon Evans (1975–1978); Jovan Adepo (2019)

In-universe information
- Occupation: Engineer
- Family: George Jefferson (father); Louise Jefferson (mother)
- Spouse: Jenny Willis (1976–1985)
- Children: Jessica Jefferson (daughter)
- Relatives: William T. Jefferson (grandfather); Olivia Jefferson (grandmother); Harold Mills (grandfather); Henry Jefferson (uncle); Ruby Jefferson (aunt); Maxine Mills (aunt); Raymond Jefferson (cousin); Jason Mills (cousin); Julie Williams (cousin)

Lionel Jefferson is a supporting character from the hit sitcoms All in the Family and The Jeffersons. He is the son of George and Louise Jefferson. He was originally portrayed by D'Urville Martin for two unaired pilots, before the role was recast with Mike Evans. He was later played by Damon Evans (no relation), though Mike Evans eventually returned to the role before the end of the series. Jovan Adepo portrayed the character for the television special Live in Front of a Studio Audience: Norman Lear's All in the Family and The Jeffersons.

== All in the Family ==
On All in the Family, Lionel was portrayed by Mike Evans from 1971 to 1975.

Lionel was born in New York City on October 18, 1953. His character is significant for being one of the first TV portrayals of a young, opinionated black man. Lionel is introduced in the first episode (and, in fact, appears on screen before Archie Bunker does). In one of the early episodes, the Jeffersons move into a house down the block from the Bunkers (later, the house is said to be next door). This event creates tension for Archie, though it elates Michael and Gloria. As Lionel's parents and uncle Henry appear more frequently, Lionel's role becomes less significant.

Archie considers himself to be Lionel's good friend and even mentor. For his part, Lionel remains unfazed by Archie's bigotry and unrelenting condescension. Lionel is generally amused, rather than angered or irritated, by Archie's frequent displays of ignorance and bigotry, often seeing Archie's comments as well-meaning, albeit ignorant, rather than outright malicious. As such, Lionel often enjoys patronizing Archie's attitudes by playing dumb in conversations and adopting a stereotypical speech pattern (saying things like "I'm gon' be a 'lectical engineer!" or "Lawd almighty, what is we gonna do?"). Lionel's patience runs out when Archie tells him not to see his niece socially because "white ought to stay with white and colored ought to stay with colored". Lionel finally tells Archie off (albeit calmly), but also lets him know that they can remain friends.

Of those in the Bunker household, Lionel is closest to Archie's son-in-law Michael Stivic. Lionel sometimes loses patience with Michael, feeling that Michael relates to him as a representative of the black community rather than as an individual.

== The Jeffersons ==
All in the Family's spinoff The Jeffersons premiered in 1975. Without the Bunkers as foils, Lionel's role now focuses more on his family life and his relationship with Jenny Willis (daughter of interracial couple Tom and Helen Willis). They eventually marry and gave birth to a daughter, Jessica. During the final season of The Jeffersons, Lionel and Jenny announce they are seeking a divorce (after living apart for several years while Lionel worked in Japan).

Mike Evans left The Jeffersons after its first season in order to devote more time to writing for Maude spin-off Good Times, which he had helped create. Damon Evans (no relation to Mike) played the role from the fall of 1975 until early 1978. Mike Evans returned to the series in September 1979 and appeared regularly as Lionel for two more seasons. Evans appeared infrequently after that, and made his final appearance as Lionel in the two-part episode "Sayonara" in 1985.

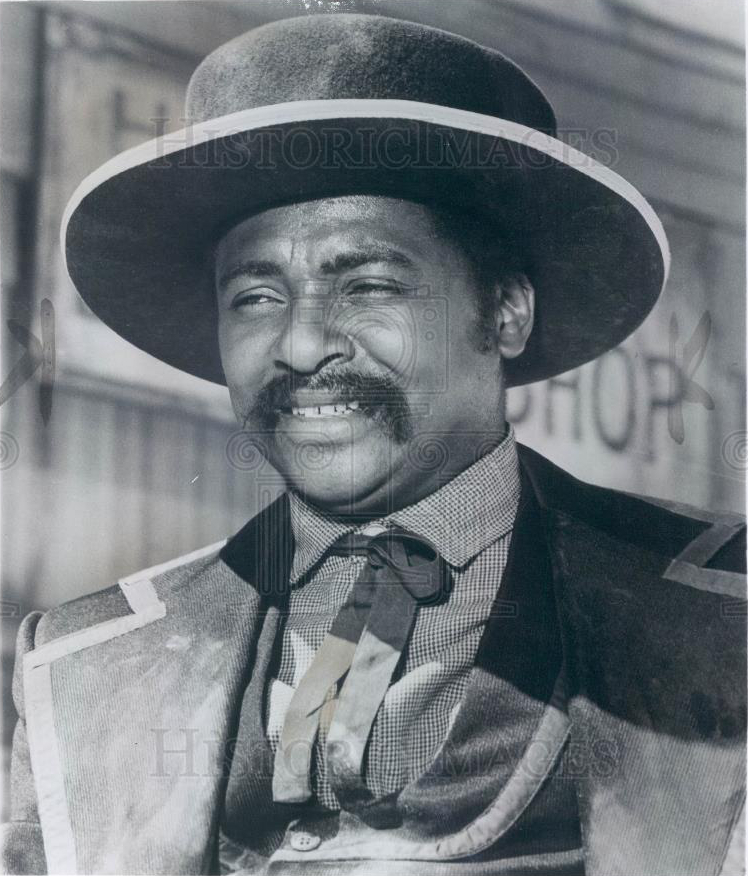
D'Urville Martin

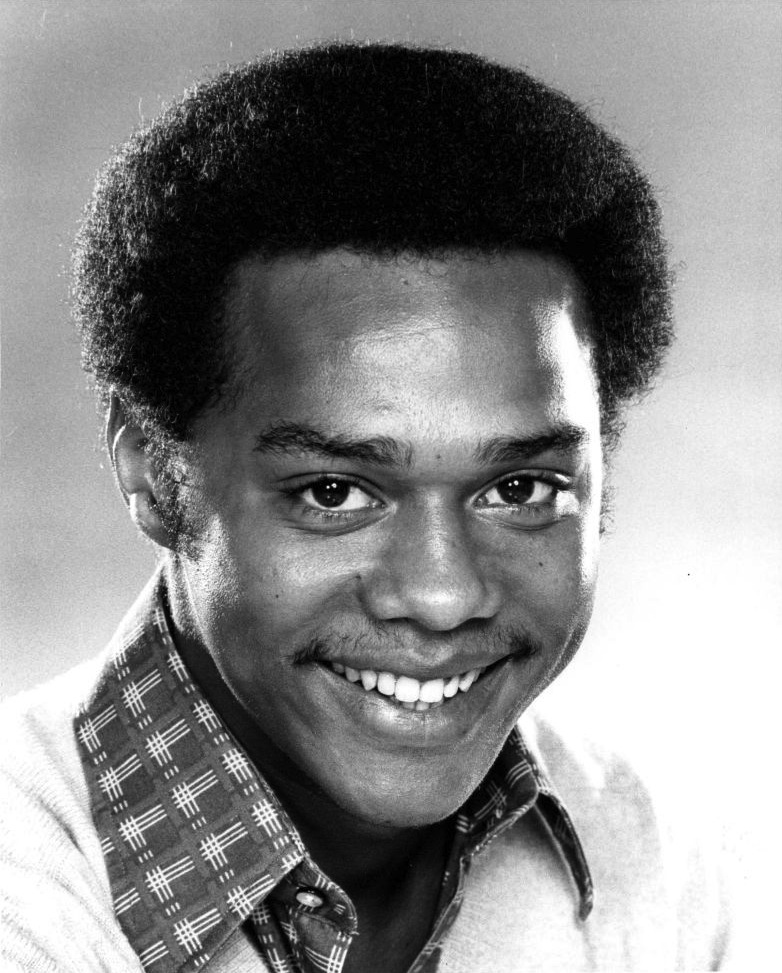
Mike Evans

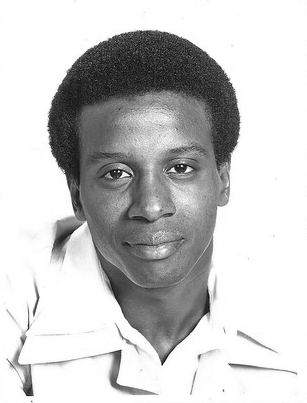
Damon Evans
