= Isabel Sanford =

American actress (1917–2004)

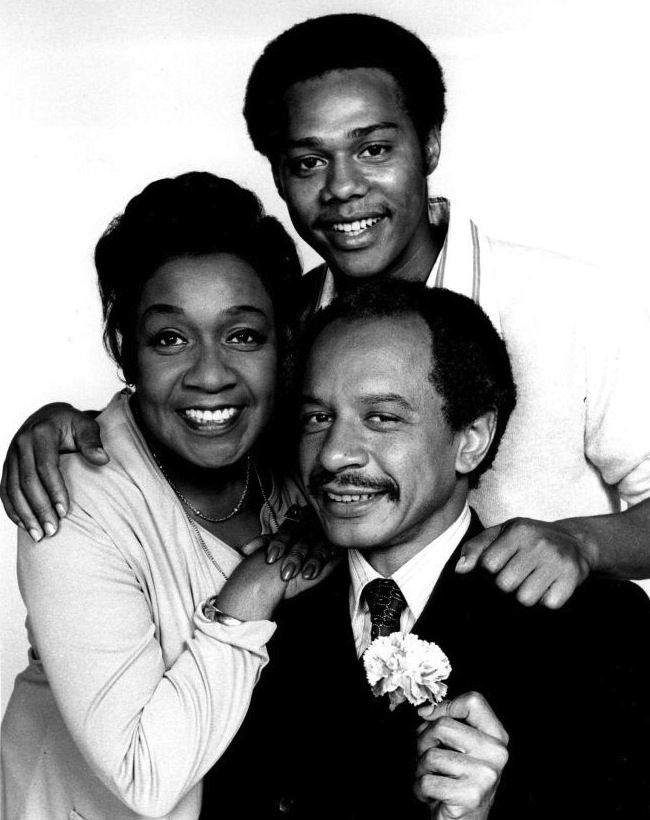
- Publicity photo of Isabel Sanford with The Jeffersons co-stars, Sherman Hemsley and Mike Evans, circa 1974
- Born: Eloise Gwendolyn Sanford; August 29, 1917; New York City, U.S.
- Died: July 9, 2004 (aged 86); Los Angeles, California, U.S.
- Resting place: Forest Lawn Memorial Park, Los Angeles
- Occupations: Actress; comedian
- Years active: 1946–2004
- Known for: Louise "Weezy" Mills–Jefferson on All in the Family and The Jeffersons
- Spouse: William E. Richmond (m. 1945; died 1960)
- Children: 3
- Awards: Primetime Emmy Award for Outstanding Lead Actress in a Comedy Series (The Jeffersons; 1981)

Eloise Gwendolyn "Isabel" Sanford (August 29, 1917 – July 9, 2004) was an American stage, film, and television actress and comedian known for her role as Louise "Weezy" Mills Jefferson on the CBS sitcoms All in the Family (1971–1975) and The Jeffersons (1975–1985). In 1981, she became the second African-American actress to win a Primetime Emmy Award after Gail Fisher and the first African-American actress to win for Outstanding Lead Actress in a Comedy Series.

== Early life ==
Sanford was born Eloise Gwendolyn Sanford on August 29, 1917, in Harlem, New York City, to Josephine (née Perry) and James Edward Sanford. She was the youngest of seven children and was the only child to survive beyond infancy. Sanford's mother Josephine was devoutly religious and insisted that her daughter attend church every Sunday, and occasionally made her attend on weeknights. As a teenager, Sanford aspired to be an actress, but her mother discouraged her, as she felt that show business was "the road to degradation." Sanford disobeyed her mother and began performing at local clubs. She also performed at amateur night at the Apollo Theater. After graduating high school, Sanford joined Harlem's American Negro Theatre and The Star Players. She made her professional stage debut in 1946 in On Strivers Row, and appeared in several off-Broadway productions while also working as a keypunch operator at IBM. In 1945, Sanford married house painter William Edward "Sonny" Richmond, with whom she had three children. Their marriage was tumultuous (a euphemism of the time for domestic violence), and they later separated.

== Career ==
In 1960, Sanford withdrew money from her retirement fund, boarded a bus with her three children, left her husband in New York, and moved to Los Angeles. Soon after her arrival, she was asked to join the national production of Here Today by actress Tallulah Bankhead. In 1965, she made her Broadway debut in James Baldwin's The Amen Corner. This role led to her being cast in the 1967 film Guess Who's Coming to Dinner. In the film, she was credited as Isabell Sanford, playing the role of the maid "Tillie Binks." Her performance was noted and earned good reviews, despite limited screen time. She caught the attention of major Hollywood players, including Norman Lear, who cast Sanford in the role of Louise Jefferson in All in the Family. Sanford and her TV husband Sherman Hemsley were so popular that Norman Lear decided to spin off the characters into their own weekly series The Jeffersons. Sanford was initially reluctant to commit to working on a weekly series, as she was already working steadily, but decided to accept the offer. The Jeffersons premiered in January 1975, and was an immediate hit with audiences, ultimately running for 11 seasons. For her role in the series, Sanford earned five Golden Globe Award nominations and seven Primetime Emmy Award nominations. She won a Primetime Emmy Award for Outstanding Lead Actress in a Comedy Series in 1981, making her the first African-American actress to win in that category and remained the only African-American actress to do so until 2023-24 when Quinta Brunson achieved this feat for her role as Janine Teagues on Abbott Elementary.

After The Jeffersons' cancellation in 1985, Sanford continued her career with guest-starring roles in television and film. In January 1987, she starred in her own sitcom, Isabel's Honeymoon Hotel, which aired five days a week in syndication. The series was created to showcase Sanford's comedic skills, but it failed to attract an audience and was quickly cancelled. In the 1990s, Sanford mainly appeared in television guest appearances and cameo appearances in movies. She appeared on Dream On, Living Single, Hangin' with Mr. Cooper, In the House, Lois & Clark: The New Adventures of Superman, The Steve Harvey Show, and Hearts Are Wild. In 1996, she played a supporting role in the action movie Original Gangstas, starring blaxploitation film stars Fred Williamson, Pam Grier, Jim Brown, and Richard Roundtree. Isabel Sanford appeared in Kojak Season 1 Episode 14 "Die Before They Wake" in 1974.

Sanford later reprised her role as Louise Jefferson in a touring company of The Real Live Jeffersons stage show in the mid-1990s alongside Sherman Hemsley. She and Hemsley also made a cameo appearance in the film Sprung, and guest-starred in The Parkers, Mafia!, and two episodes of The Fresh Prince of Bel-Air. The two also appeared in a series of advertisements for Denny's and Old Navy. In January 2004, Sanford received a star on the Hollywood Walk of Fame for her contribution to the television industry. She made her final television appearance the following month as an animated version of herself in The Simpsons episode "Milhouse Doesn't Live Here Anymore."

== Personal life ==
Sanford married house painter William Edward "Sonny" Richmond in 1945. The couple had three children—two sons (Sanford K. Richmond and Eric Richmond) and a daughter (Pamela Richmond Ruff) before separating in 1960. Following the separation, Sanford and the children moved to Los Angeles. Richmond remained in New York and died later that same year.

== Death ==
In September 2003, Sanford underwent preventive surgery on her carotid artery. In the ensuing months, her health steadily declined. She was hospitalized at Cedars-Sinai Medical Center on July 4, 2004, where she died five days later at the age of 86. Her publicist attributed it to unspecified natural causes. She was interred at Forest Lawn Memorial Park, Hollywood Hills in Los Angeles. For her contribution to the television industry, Isabel Sanford has a star on the Hollywood Walk of Fame located at 7080 Hollywood Boulevard.

== Broadway credits ==
Date	Production	Role
April 15 – June 26, 1965	The Amen Corner	Sister Moore

== Filmography ==
Film
Year	Title	Role	Notes
1967	Guess Who's Coming to Dinner	Tillie	
1968	The Young Runaways	Sarah	
1969	Pendulum	Effie	
1969	The Comic	Ethel	
1970	The Red, White, and Black	Isabel Taylor	
1972	Stand Up and Be Counted	Beverly	Uncredited
1972	Every Little Crook and Nanny	Nanny Rose	Uncredited
1972	The New Centurions	Wilma	
1972	Hickey & Boggs	Maryanne- Nyona's Mother	
1972	Lady Sings the Blues	Madame Blaine	
1972	Pete 'n' Tillie	Nanny Mae	Uncredited
1972	Up the Sandbox	Maria	
1974	The Photographer	Mrs. Thomas Slade	
1979	Love At First Bite	Judge R. Thomas	
1981	Desperate Moves	Dottie Butz	
1990	Pucker Up and Bark Like a Dog	Joanna	
1992	South Beach	Mama Joan	
1996	Original Gangstas	Gracie Bookman	
1997	Sprung	RosaLynn Charleson	
1998	Jane Austen's Mafia!	Mrs. Louise Jefferson	Uncredited
2000	Click Three Times	Dorothy	Short

Television
Year	Title	Role	Notes
1968	The Carol Burnett Show	Sketch Performer	Episodes #2.1, 2.9, 2.12, 3.8
1968	Bewitched	Aunt Jenny	Episode: "Samantha Goes South for a Spell"
1968	The Mod Squad	Lillian	Episode: "Love"; Credited as Isabell Sanford
1970	Daniel Boone	Maybelle	Episode: "Sunshine Patriots"
1971	The Bill Cosby Show	Bertha	Episode: "The Barber Shop"; Credited as Isabell Sanford
1971	The Interns	Dr. Alice Hearn	Episode: "The Choice"
1971–1972	Love, American Style	Various roles	2 episodes
1971–1975	All in the Family	Louise Jefferson	26 episodes
1972	The Mary Tyler Moore Show	Mrs. Isabell Wilson	Episode: "His Two Right Arms"
1972	The Great Man's Whiskers	Ella	Television film
1972	Wait Till Your Father Gets Home	Betsy	Voice, Episode: "Help Wanted"
1973	Temperatures Rising	Mrs. Marny Noland	Episode: "The Mothers"
1974	Kojak	Grace	Episode: "Die Before They Wake"
1975–1985	The Jeffersons	Louise Jefferson	253 episodes
1978	Vega$	Mae	Episode: "Milliken's Stash"
1979	Supertrain	Reba	Episode: "Pirouette"
1980–1983	The Love Boat	Tanya Washington, Isaac's Aunt	2 episodes
1984	Reading Rainbow	Narrator	Episode: "The Patchwork Quilt"
1986	Crazy Like a Fox	Pamela	1 episode
1986	The New Mike Hammer	Mama Vibes	Episode: "Harlem Nocturne"
1987	Isabel Sanford's Honeymoon Hotel	Isabel Scott	5 episodes
1988	A Pup Named Scooby-Doo	Additional voices	Episode "A Bicycle Built for Boo!"
1993	Dream On	Judge Isabel Kohner	Episode: "Oral Sex, Lies and Videotape"
1993	Living Single	Ms. Eunetta Ryan	Episode: "Quittin' Time"
1994	Hangin' with Mr. Cooper	Judge Annie Colton	Episode: "The Courtship of Mark Cooper"
1994	Lois & Clark: The New Adventures of Superman	Ms. Margaret Duffy	Episode: "Seasons Greedings"
1995	Roseanne	Louise Jefferson, TV Mom #3	Episode: "All About Rosey"
1995	In the House	Nanna Roosetta Warren	2 episodes
1995–1996	The Fresh Prince of Bel-Air	Louise "Weezy" Jefferson	2 episodes
1996	The Steve Harvey Show	Mother Hightower	Episode: "That's My Mama"
1997	Teen Angel	Laurie	Episode: "Sings Like an Angel"
1998	Pepper Ann	Bernice	Voice, Episode: "Cocoon Gables/Green-Eyed Monster"
1999	Jackie's Back	Miss Isabel Krumes	Television film
2001	The Parkers	Evelyn "Nana" Smith	Episode: "Hands Off, Grandma"
2002	The Young and the Restless	Sylvia	Episode #1.7534
2004	The Simpsons	Herself	Voice, Episode: "Milhouse Doesn't Live Here Anymore"
2004	Candid Camera	Mrs. Jefferson	Episode: "Mother's Day", (final appearance)

== Awards and nominations ==
Year	Award	Category	Title of work	Result
1979	Primetime Emmy Award	Outstanding Lead Actress in a Comedy Series	The Jeffersons	Nominated
1980	Primetime Emmy Award	Outstanding Lead Actress in a Comedy Series	The Jeffersons	Nominated
1981	Primetime Emmy Award	Outstanding Lead Actress in a Comedy Series	The Jeffersons	Won
1982	Primetime Emmy Award	Outstanding Lead Actress in a Comedy Series	The Jeffersons	Nominated
1983	Primetime Emmy Award	Outstanding Lead Actress in a Comedy Series	The Jeffersons	Nominated
1984	Primetime Emmy Award	Outstanding Lead Actress in a Comedy Series	The Jeffersons	Nominated
1985	Primetime Emmy Award	Outstanding Lead Actress in a Comedy Series	The Jeffersons	Nominated
1977	Golden Globe Award	Best TV Actress - Musical/Comedy	The Jeffersons	Nominated
1978	Golden Globe Award	Best TV Actress - Musical/Comedy	The Jeffersons	Nominated
1983	Golden Globe Award	Best Performance by an Actress in a TV-Series - Comedy/Musical	The Jeffersons	Nominated
1984	Golden Globe Award	Best Performance by an Actress in a TV-Series - Comedy/Musical	The Jeffersons	Nominated
1985	Golden Globe Award	Best Performance by an Actress in a TV-Series - Comedy/Musical	The Jeffersons	Nominated
2004	TV Land Awards	Favorite Cantankerous Couple	The Jeffersons (Shared with Sherman Hemsley)	Won

== See also ==
- List of people from Harlem
