= The Jeffersons =

American sitcom (1975–1985)

- Genre: Sitcom
- Created by: Don Nicholl; Michael Ross; Bernie West
- Developed by: Norman Lear
- Directed by: Jack Shea (seasons 1–5); Various (seasons 4 & 10–11); Bob Lally (seasons 5–9)
- Starring: Isabel Sanford; Sherman Hemsley; Marla Gibbs; Roxie Roker; Franklin Cover; Paul Benedict; Mike Evans; Berlinda Tolbert; Zara Cully; Damon Evans; Jay Hammer
- Theme music composer: Jeff Barry; Ja'Net DuBois
- Opening theme: "Movin' on Up" performed by Ja'Net DuBois
- Composer: Don Great
- Country of origin: United States
- Original language: English
- No. of seasons: 11
- No. of episodes: 253 (list of episodes)

Production
- Executive producers: David Duclon; Ron Leavitt; Jay Moriarty; Mike Milligan; Don Nicholl; Michael Ross; George Sunga; Bernie West
- Producers: David Duclon; Ron Leavitt; Michael G. Moye; Jerry Perzigian; Donald L. Seigel; Jack Shea
- Production locations: CBS Television City, Hollywood, California; Metromedia Square, Hollywood, California; Universal City Studios, Universal City, California
- Camera setup: Multi-camera
- Running time: 22–24 minutes
- Production companies: T.A.T. Communications Company; NRW Productions; Ragamuffin Productions; Embassy Television

Original release
- Network: CBS
- Release: January 18, 1975 – July 2, 1985

Related
- All in the Family; Maude; Good Times; Archie Bunker's Place; Gloria; 704 Hauser; E/R; Checking In

The Jeffersons is an American sitcom television series created by Norman Lear, which aired on CBS from January 18, 1975, to July 2, 1985, lasting eleven seasons and 253 total episodes. Starring Isabel Sanford and Sherman Hemsley, the show revolved around a prosperous African-American couple who live in a high-rise apartment in Manhattan, New York City. The show is a spin-off of All in the Family, on which the Jeffersons had been the neighbors of the Bunkers.

== Premise ==
The show focuses on George and Louise Jefferson, a prosperous black couple who have been able to move from Queens to Manhattan owing to the success of George's dry-cleaning chain, Jefferson Cleaners. The show was launched as the second (and longest running) spin-off of All in the Family (after Maude), on which the Jeffersons had been the neighbors of Archie and Edith Bunker. The show was the creation of Norman Lear. The Jeffersons eventually evolved into more of a traditional sitcom, but episodes occasionally focused on serious issues such as alcoholism, racism, suicide, gun control, being transgender, the KKK, and adult illiteracy. The epithets nigger and honky were used occasionally, especially during the earlier seasons.

The Jeffersons had one spin-off, titled Checking In. The series was centered on the Jeffersons' housekeeper, Florence, who takes a job as executive housekeeper at a hotel. Checking In lasted only four episodes, after which Florence returned to The Jeffersons with the story that the hotel had burned down in a fire. The Jeffersons also shared continuity with the sitcom E/R, which featured Lynne Moody, who made a guest appearance in one episode of The Jeffersons. Sherman Hemsley guest-starred as George in two episodes of the series, which lasted for one season. The cancellation of The Jeffersons cleared the way for Marla Gibbs, who played Florence Johnston on the series, to move on to the NBC sitcom 227 in the fall of 1985, a year earlier than scheduled.

The Jeffersons ended in controversy after CBS abruptly canceled the series without allowing for a proper series finale. The cast was not informed until after the July 2, 1985, episode, "Red Robins"; actor Sherman Hemsley, who portrayed George Jefferson, said he learned that the show was canceled by reading it in the newspaper. Isabel Sanford (Louise Jefferson), who heard about the cancellation through her cousin who read it in the tabloids, publicly stated that she found the cancellation with no proper finale to be disrespectful on the network's part. Per an article in the May 8, 1985, Los Angeles Times, the series was cancelled by announcement at the CBS network "upfront" presentation the day before, nearly two months before the airing of the final episode. Actor Franklin Cover, who played Tom Willis, also heard about the cancellation while watching Entertainment Tonight.

The cast reunited in a stage play based on the sitcom. In season 5 episode 17 of The Fresh Prince of Bel-Air, titled "Will Is from Mars" (1995), the Jeffersons made a guest appearance as a couple in therapy class. In the 1996 series finale of The Fresh Prince of Bel-Air, the Jeffersons made a guest appearance as the buyers of the Banks family house. In an episode of Tyler Perry's House of Payne in 2011, Sherman Hemsley and Marla Gibbs reprised their roles of George Jefferson and Florence Johnston.

In 1985, Hemsley and Sanford (who was older than her TV husband by 21 years) made a special joint guest appearance in the Canale 5 comedy show Grand Hotel as the Jeffersons, acting with Italian actors Paolo Villaggio, the comic duo Franco & Ciccio, and Carmen Russo. They were guests in the fictional hotel and their voices were dubbed by Italian actors Enzo Garinei (George) and Isa di Marzio (Louise), who also dubbed their characters for the full series. As of 2023, the members still alive from the main cast include Marla Gibbs, Berlinda Tolbert, Damon Evans, and Jay Hammer.

== Series development ==
Louise Jefferson, played by Isabel Sanford, first appeared in the All in the Family episode "Lionel Moves Into the Neighborhood", which was broadcast on March 2, 1971. The episode, the eighth of the series, centers on Louise, her son Lionel, and her husband George moving next door to Archie and Edith Bunker in the working-class section of Queens. Lionel, played by Mike Evans, first appeared in "Meet the Bunkers", the premiere episode of All in the Family.

Norman Lear created the character of George Jefferson specifically for Hemsley. Lear originally intended for George to appear in the first season of the series, but Hemsley was starring in the Broadway musical Purlie at the time, and Lear decided to postpone introduction of the character until Hemsley was available. Lear created the character of Henry Jefferson, George's younger brother, who was portrayed by Mel Stewart which replaced George with Henry in the series's scripts until Purlie finished its run. Denzel Washington auditioned for an unspecified role, but his agent convinced him not to do it. Henry played as George when Louise felt embarrassed that George did not want to be in Archie Bunker's house due to prejudice. George was introduced in the episode "Henry's Farewell", and Hemsley and Stewart share their only scene together in its final minutes. The episode marked the final appearance of Henry throughout the series.

The idea of the Jeffersons "moving on up" came after three members of the Black Panthers who were fans of Lear's productions visited Lear's CBS office, raising issues with the creator over the portrayal of Black people on television, including his Maude spin-off series Good Times. "Every time you see a Black man on the tube, he is dirt poor, wears shit clothes, can't afford nothing," Lear recalled in his autobiography. Lear consulted with his associate Al Burton on the concept.

George, Louise, and Lionel continued to appear on All in the Family until 1975, when the spin-off The Jeffersons, also created by Lear, premiered. The characters of Lionel's multiracial fiancée, Jenny, and her family, all of whom first appeared in the 1974 All in the Family episode "Lionel's Engagement", were also written into the new series. However, the roles were all recast, with Berlinda Tolbert taking over the role of Jenny, veteran actor Franklin Cover playing her father, Tom Willis, whose first name was changed from Louis, as it was in their first All in the Family appearance, and Roxie Roker as her mother, Helen. Roker was asked during a casting interview if she would be comfortable with her character having a white husband. In response she showed a picture of her husband, Sy Kravitz, who was white.

== Synopsis ==
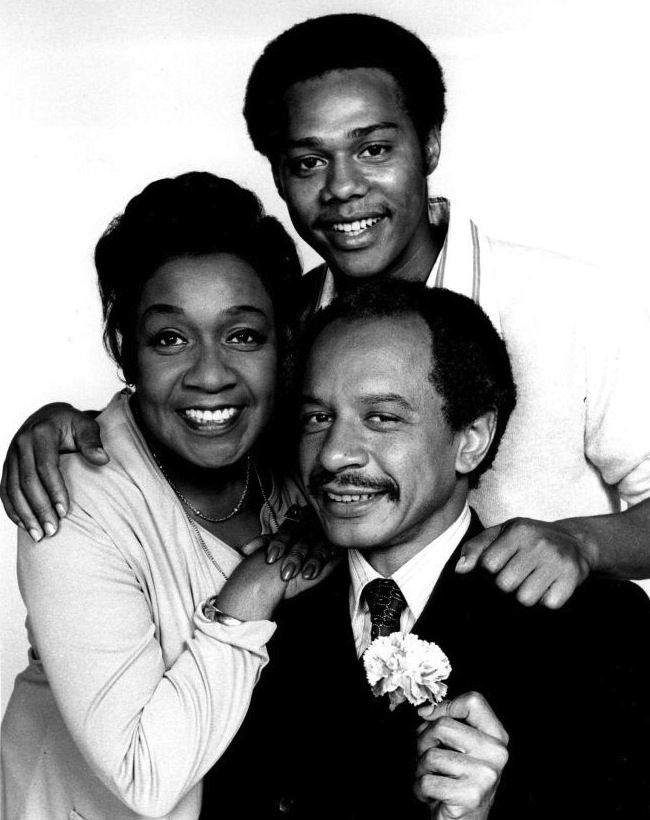
Cast of The Jeffersons, clockwise from top: Mike Evans, Sherman Hemsley, and Isabel Sanford (1975)

During the January 11, 1975 episode of All in the Family, titled "The Jeffersons Move Up", Edith Bunker gave a tearful good-bye to her neighbor Louise Jefferson as her husband George, their son Lionel, and she moved from a working-class section of Queens, New York, into the luxurious Colby East, a fictional high-rise apartment complex on East 63rd Street on the Upper East Side of Manhattan. The Jeffersons premiered the following week, on January 18, 1975.

George's career as a dry-cleaner began in the first season of All in the Family in the third episode "Archie's Aching Back" (though the character himself did not appear on-camera). After his car was rear-ended by a bus, he filed a civil action and won $5000, enough to open his first store in Queens. At the beginning of The Jeffersons, he was operating five stores throughout New York City, with another two opening during the following seasons.

Louise made friends with Tom and Helen Willis, an interracial couple with two adult children of their own (whom George derided as "zebras"): son Allan (played by Andrew Rubin in the first-season finale, and by Jay Hammer throughout season 5), a white-passing college drop-out; and daughter Jenny, an aspiring fashion designer. Jenny and Lionel became a couple, married on December 24, 1976, and later became the parents of a daughter, Jessica (played by Ebonie Smith). Lionel and Jenny experienced marital issues as evidenced in a two-part season 8 episode "The Separation". They divorced in the season finale, a two-parter titled "Sayonara".

Marla Gibbs portrayed the role of Florence Johnston, the Jeffersons' back-talking, tough, wisecracking, and devoutly religious housekeeper. Florence often teased George, mostly about his short stature and receding hairline. One episode featured George requesting Florence to insult him, in order to get to a prospective business partner who was fond of her wisecracks.

Paul Benedict arrived as Harry Bentley, an amiable, kind, loyal yet eccentric British next-door neighbor, who worked as an interpreter at the United Nations. A frequent sight-gag of the show was George slamming the door in Bentley's face mid-conversation, usually during one of Bentley's stories which George invariably perceived as boring. Bentley also had a bad back, and frequently needed George to walk on it. He also became known for addressing the Jeffersons as "Mr. J" and "Mrs. J".

Zara Cully played George's mother, Olivia "Mother" Jefferson, who constantly disparaged her daughter-in-law. Cully, who had first appeared in the 1974 All in the Family episode "Lionel's Engagement", reprised her role. She appeared regularly in the first two seasons, but made sporadic appearances over the next two years, much thinner due to a severe case of pneumonia. Cully was written out in season 4 due to her death in 1978, from lung cancer. No episode was centered on Mother Jefferson's death, but it was occasionally mentioned in future episodes that she had died.

Ned Wertimer played their tip-hungry doorman, Ralph Hart, throughout the series. He was known for constantly stalling at the Jeffersons' door with his hand out waiting for a tip. Most of the cast usually didn't respond, but George almost always gave in. He also used it in a blackmail manner, usually requiring George to pay more in order to keep his mouth shut about something such as a stock tip. Ralph was also known for making up stories of him struggling to fulfill the Jeffersons' request to get more tips.

Danny Wells played Charlie, the owner and a bartender of a bar on the ground floor of the Jeffersons apartment building. The cast commonly visited the bar for a drink or to attend a party. Charlie was also revealed to be an alcoholic in the season 11 episode "A Secret in the Back Room", in which Charlie is in denial, but the Jeffersons eventually get him to admit to his problem and advise him to get some help. His alcohol problem isn't referenced anymore throughout the series, but it is assumable Charlie overcame it.

=== Cast changes ===
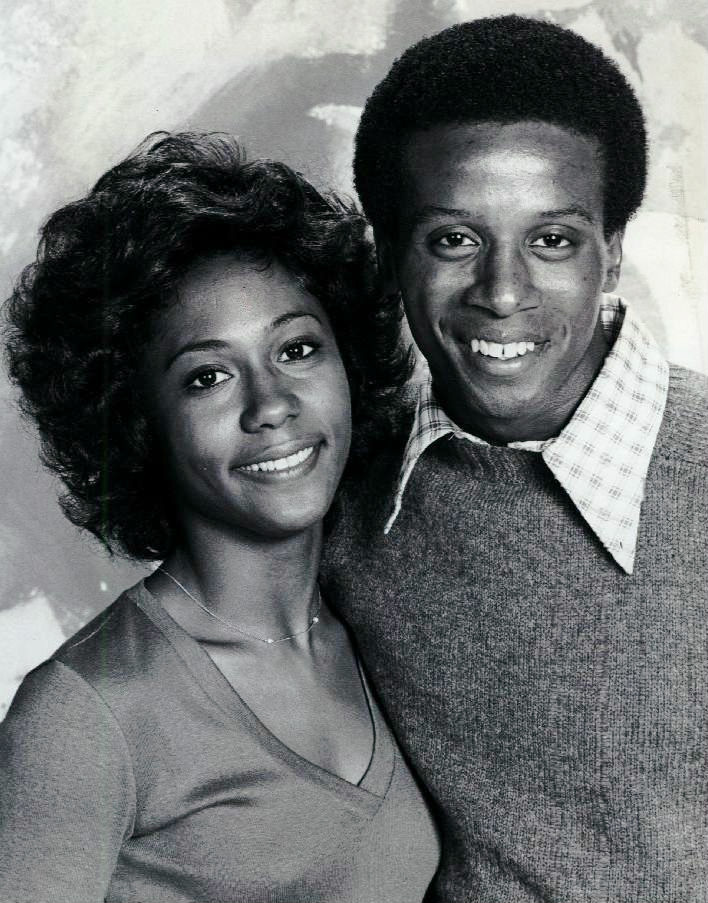
Berlinda Tolbert and Damon Evans as Jenny and Lionel (1976)

Mike Evans ("Lionel") left the show after the first season; his replacement was Damon Evans (no relation), who took over the role until halfway through the fourth season. Damon Evans's last episode was "Lionel Gets the Business".

Mike Evans and Tolbert returned in the 1979–1980 season, with Tolbert's character, Jenny, pregnant with a daughter named Jessica. However, Mike Evans appeared for only one more season, along with Tolbert. The Jeffersons' sixth season peaked at No. 8 in the summer of 1980. The characters of Lionel and Jenny were written out by stating that they had marital problems, the result of which became a two-part episode storyline as the series' eighth-season premiere. The series' eighth season was the first African-American sitcom in years (since Sanford and Son) to peak in the top 5 (the series' eighth season debuted at No. 3).

Evans and Tolbert appeared in the two-part episode together; Evans made his final appearance in two episodes during the series' eleventh and final season. Tolbert became a regular guest star throughout the rest of the series. In the spring of 1981, Paul Benedict left the show for a season and a half, returning in the final two seasons of the series. However, the ratings sank below the top 30, and The Jeffersons aired its last episode, "Red Robins", on July 2, 1985.

== Cast ==
=== Main ===
Performer	Character	Seasons										
Performer	Character	1	2	3	4	5	6	7	8	9	10	11
Isabel Sanford	Louise "Weezy" Jefferson	Main	Main	Main	Main	Main	Main	Main	Main	Main	Main	Main
Sherman Hemsley	George Jefferson	Main	Main	Main	Main	Main	Main	Main	Main	Main	Main	Main
Mike Evans	Lionel Jefferson	Main					Main	Main	Recurring			Guest
Damon Evans	Lionel Jefferson		Main	Main	Main							
Roxie Roker	Helen Willis	Main	Main	Main	Main	Main	Main	Main	Main	Main	Main	Main
Franklin Cover	Thomas "Tom" Willis	Main	Main	Main	Main	Main	Main	Main	Main	Main	Main	Main
Zara Cully	Olivia "Mother" Jefferson	Main	Main	Main	Main							
Berlinda Tolbert	Jenny Willis-Jefferson	Main	Main	Main	Main	Main	Main	Main	Recurring	Recurring	Recurring	Recurring
Paul Benedict	Harry Bentley	Main	Main	Main	Main	Main	Main	Main	Main		Main	Main
Marla Gibbs	Florence Johnston	Recurring	Recurring	Recurring	Main	Main	Main	Main	Main	Main	Main	Main
Jay Hammer	Allan Willis					Main						

=== Recurring ===
- Ned Wertimer as Ralph Hart
- Danny Wells as Charlie Clark
- Ernest Harden Jr. as Marcus Henderson (seasons 4–6)
- Frank De Vol as Sammy (seasons 7–8)
- Leonard Lightfoot as Officer Barrett (seasons 7–8)
- Ebonie Smith as Jessica Jefferson (season 11)

=== Guest stars ===
- Raymond Allen
- Frances Bay
- Billy Beck
- Johnny Brown
- Tom Brown
- Thomas Callaway
- Barbara Cason
- Charo
- Alvin Childress
- Gary Coleman
- Andrae Crouch (as himself)
- Sammy Davis Jr. (as himself)
- George DeNormand
- Frank De Vol
- Phyllis Diller (as herself)
- David Dukes
- Famous Amos
- Richard Foronjy
- Bernard Fox
- Joe Frazier
- Susie Garrett
- Louis Gossett Jr.
- Rosey Grier
- Edward Grover
- Robert Guillaume
- Moses Gunn
- Kene Holliday
- Engelbert Humperdinck
- Peter Iacangelo
- Reggie Jackson
- Irwin Keyes
- Victor Kilian
- Lincoln Kilpatrick
- Mabel King
- Gladys Knight
- Jack Knight
- Peter Lawford (voice)
- Larry Linville
- George Loros
- Carl Lumbly
- Helen Martin
- Edie McClurg
- Garrett Morris
- Greg Morris
- Josephine Premice
- Eddie Quillan
- Sheryl Lee Ralph
- Thalmus Rasulala
- Helen Reddy
- Susan Ruttan
- Robert Sampson
- Sister Sledge
- Jack Somack
- Michael Spinks
- Amzie Strickland
- Randy Stumpf
- Ernest Lee Thomas
- Liz Torres
- Arthur Tovey
- Peter Turgeon
- Vernon Washington (as Leroy)
- Vernee Watson
- Jaleel White
- Billy Dee Williams (as himself)
- Hal Williams
- Alfie Wise

== Episodes ==
Season	Episodes	Originally released		Rank	Rating
Season	Episodes	First released	Last released	Rank	Rating
1	13	January 18, 1975	April 12, 1975	4	27.6
2	24	September 13, 1975	March 6, 1976	21	21.5
3	24	September 25, 1976	April 11, 1977	24	21.0
4	26	September 24, 1977	March 4, 1978	52	17.6
5	24	September 20, 1978	April 18, 1979	49	17.4
6	24	September 23, 1979	April 13, 1980	8	24.3
7	20	November 2, 1980	March 29, 1981	6	23.5
8	25	October 4, 1981	May 16, 1982	3	23.4
9	27	September 26, 1982	May 1, 1983	12	20.0 (Note: Tied with Newhart.)
10	22	October 2, 1983	May 6, 1984	19	16.6
11	24	October 14, 1984	July 2, 1985	50	13.2

The Jeffersons had many two-part episodes, either over two consecutive weeks, or aired as an hour-long episode.

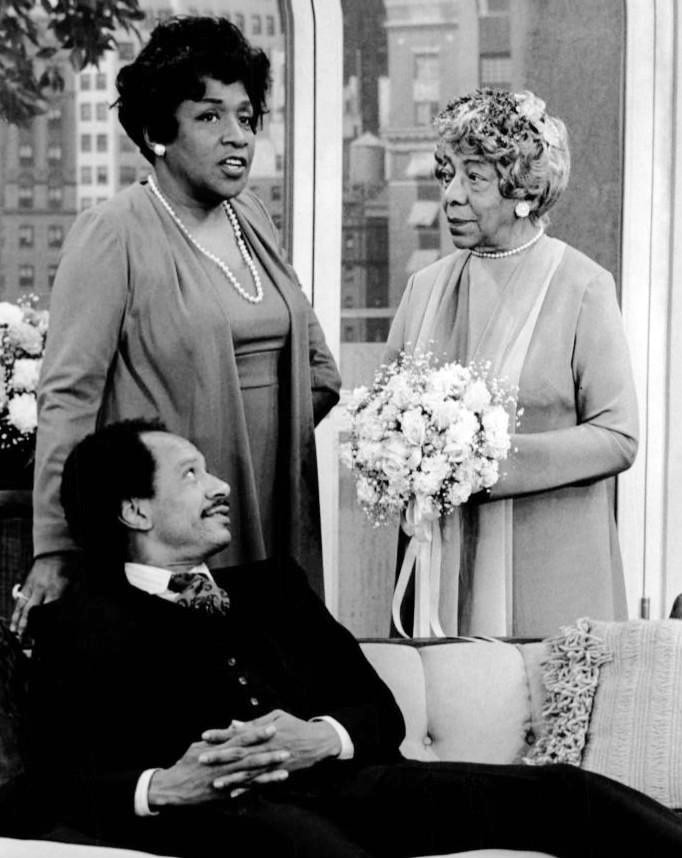
George and Louise with Mother Jefferson (1975)

== Theme song ==
Ja'Net DuBois and Jeff Barry co-wrote The Jeffersons theme song, "Movin' On Up", which was sung by DuBois with a gospel choir.

The song was created after DuBois approached Norman Lear, suggesting she expand upon her brief roles on Good Times and explore a music-related project. In response, Lear suggested she try writing a theme song for a new show he was developing about a dry cleaner. Initially, DuBois struggled with the composition until her mother encouraged her to draw from her personal dream of providing her mother with a comfortable retirement. Inspired by that idea, DuBois wrote the song. When Lear heard it, he was amazed at how perfectly it captured the essence of The Jeffersons—despite the fact that he hadn't fully explained the show's concept to her. Lear went on to develop a full arrangement of the song to serve as the show's theme.

== Broadcast history and Nielsen ratings ==
The Jeffersons changed time slots at least 15 different times during its 11-year run, unusual for a popular long running series. The most common time slot was on Sunday night.

In its first season (1974–75), the show ranked at number four, surpassed by its parent series All in the Family (which landed at number one for the fifth year in a row). The show's ratings for the following two seasons placed it in the Top 30, but during the 1977–78 and 1978–79 seasons (the show's fourth and fifth seasons), it fell out of the top 30, ranking 52nd in Season 4 and 49th in Season 5.

It returned to the Top 10 in 1979–80, and at the end of the 1981–82 season, The Jeffersons finished third overall, only surpassed by fellow CBS series Dallas and 60 Minutes. The series would remain among the Top 20 for the next two seasons.

== Daytime reruns ==
The series was rebroadcast on CBS from February 4, 1980, to September 25, 1981.

== Home media ==
Sony Pictures Home Entertainment released the first six seasons of The Jeffersons on DVD in Region 1 between 2002 and 2007.

On August 27, 2013, it was announced that Mill Creek Entertainment had acquired the rights to various television series from the Sony Pictures library including The Jeffersons. They subsequently re-released the first two seasons on DVD on May 20, 2014.

On August 8, 2014, it was announced that Shout! Factory had acquired the rights to the series from Sony Pictures Home Entertainment; they subsequently released the complete series on DVD in a 33-disc collection on December 9, 2014.

On April 28, 2015, Shout! released season 7 on DVD in Region 1. Season 8 was released on August 11, 2015.

DVD name	Ep. #s	Release date
The Complete First Season	13	August 6, 2002; May 20, 2014 (re-release)
The Complete Second Season	24	May 13, 2003; May 20, 2014 (re-release)
The Complete Third Season	24	April 12, 2005
The Complete Fourth Season	26	October 11, 2005
The Complete Fifth Season	24	August 15, 2006
The Complete Sixth Season	24	March 27, 2007
The Complete Seventh Season	20	April 28, 2015
The Complete Eighth Season	25	August 11, 2015
The Complete Series	253	December 9, 2014

== Awards and nominations ==
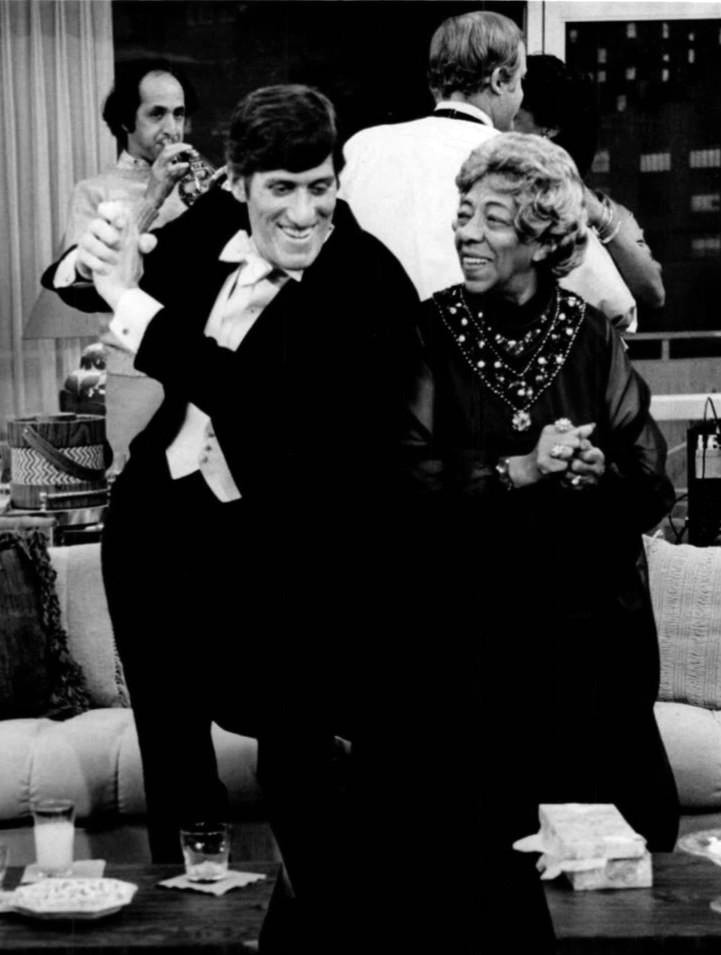
Harry Bentley and Mother Jefferson (1975)

The Jeffersons received 14 Emmy Award nominations and won two awards. Marla Gibbs was nominated for Best Supporting Actress in a Comedy Series each year from 1981 to 1985, Sherman Hemsley was nominated for Best Actor in 1984, and Larry M. Harris won the Emmy for Outstanding Video Tape Editing for a Series in 1983.

Isabel Sanford was nominated for seven consecutive Best Actress Emmys, from 1979 to 1985. Her win in 1981 made her the first African-American actress to win an Emmy for Best Actress in a Comedy Series, and the second to win any Emmy Award; Gail Fisher, who played Peggy on the TV show Mannix, preceded her in 1970. Sanford was also the recipient of five of the eight Golden Globe Awards nominations the program received.

=== Criticism ===
Gregory Kane, journalist for The Baltimore Sun, called the series "demeaning" in 1999, criticizing Hemsley's "pimp roll walk", bigotry, loud mouth and low intelligence. "I hereby declare The Jeffersons stereotypical fare that depicts blacks in a buffoonish manner."

== Reunion tour ==
In 1993, Sherman Hemsley, Isabel Sanford, Roxie Roker, Franklin Cover, and Marla Gibbs reunited for "The Jeffersons Live: The Movin' On Up Tour," AKA "The Best of the Jeffersons Live." The stage show included recreations of the episodes "A Whole Lot of Trouble," "Social Insecurity," and "My Wife... I Think I'll Keep Her." The tour began in Detroit, Michigan for a six-city stop, and eventually Roker dropped out, but Berlinda Tolbert (Jenny) and Ned Wertimer (Ralph) reprised their roles for the Los Angeles staging in 1994.

== 2019 special ==
On May 22, 2019, ABC broadcast Live in Front of a Studio Audience: Norman Lear's All in the Family and The Jeffersons, produced by Lear and Jimmy Kimmel and starring Woody Harrelson, Marisa Tomei, Jamie Foxx, Wanda Sykes, Ike Barinholtz, Kerry Washington, and Ellie Kemper. Marla Gibbs reprised her role as Florence Johnston.
