= Jay Hammer =

American screenwriter

- Born: November 16, 1944 (age 80); San Francisco, California, U.S.
- Occupation(s): Actor, television writer
- Years active: 1968–2009
- Spouse: Dene Nardi (m. 1990)
- Partner: Pamela K. Long
- Children: 4

Jay Hammer (born November 16, 1944) is an American actor best known for his run as freelancer journalist Fletcher Reade who falls in love with Dr. Claire Ramsey on CBS Daytime's Guiding Light from March 1984 until March 1998. He returned briefly in the spring of 1999, and again made an appearance as the show ended in 2009. He had a notable role as Allan Willis during the 1978–1979 season of The Jeffersons. His character on The Jeffersons was the son of mixed-race couple Tom and Helen Willis (Franklin Cover and Roxie Roker).

Other appearances include roles in The Blue Knight, Kojak, Mannix, Sons and Daughters, Emergency!, and Adam-12. His theater credits include off-Broadway productions of Passing Through from Exotic Places and Serenading Louie. He played the role of ranch forehand Max Dekker on Texas in 1981.

== Personal life ==
He was married to Marielouise Tanner from 1967-1981. They had one son. He then had two more sons with Texas and Guiding Light writer Pamela K. Long. He has been married to Denise Nardi since 1990; they have one daughter. Hammer wrote for Guiding Light under the name Charles Jay Hammer.
