= List of The Jeffersons supporting characters =

The television series The Jeffersons featured several supporting characters. An incomplete list of these characters appears below.

== Willis family ==
=== Helen Willis ===
Helen Willis (née Douglas) (portrayed by Roxie Roker, except for her first appearance in All in the Family, when she was portrayed by Kim Hamilton) is Louise's best friend and George's nemesis. She has been married to Tom Willis, a white man, for 34 years. George, opposed to miscegenation, calls Helen and Tom "zebras" or "chocolate and vanilla". Helen often strikes back by calling George "shorty". In the fourth season, Helen works with Louise as volunteers at the Help Center, a social services facility, which opened in 1977. Helen and Tom have two children: Jennifer "Jenny" Willis (Berlinda Tolbert) and Allan Willis (Jay Hammer and Andrew Rubin).

The character's marriage status also paralleled Roxie Roker's real life interracial marriage between 1962 and 1985 to white Sy Kravitz.

Kerry Washington portrayed Helen in 2019 for Live in Front of a Studio Audience.

=== Tom Willis ===
Thomas "Tom" Willis (portrayed by Franklin Cover, except for his first appearance in All in the Family, when he was portrayed by Charles Aidman as Louis Willis) is an author and president of his publishing company, Pelham Publishers. He lives a content life with his wife Helen. Tom is white and Helen is black, which often makes them the butt of George's insults and jokes. Tom and Helen, however, have both learned to ignore the bigotry of their neighbor. In their initial appearance on the parent show, Tom states that they had met "his" kind—black and white—and they always handled it. His daughter, Jenny Willis (who more resembles her mother in skin color), marries George's son, Lionel, in 1976. He develops a strong relationship with Jenny, but was never close to his "white" son, Allan Willis (Jay Hammer) because he never finished school and left New York City and stayed in Paris for two years.

As the series went on (particularly after Lionel and Jenny married), George and Tom eventually became good friends, though George continued to make jokes about Tom's weight. Sherman Hemsley felt that it would be insulting to continue the racially themed insults after the characters became friends.

Tom is a caring person, but often dominated by his wife. He is known to be a horrible dancer, as indicated in a few episodes. He also reluctantly goes along with George's constant schemes, but generally prefers to be left out of them.

Will Ferrell portrayed Tom in 2019 for Live in Front of a Studio Audience.

=== Allan Willis ===
Allan Willis (Andrew Harold Rubin/Jay Hammer) is the Willises' only son and older brother of Jenny. Andrew Rubin appears as this character in the first-season finale episode entitled "Jenny's Low" (aired on April 12, 1975), in which Allan returns from Europe, and is treated coldly by his sister. Jenny harbors jealousy of Allan as he turned out to be "white". They eventually reconcile. Beginning with the 1978–79 season, Allan was portrayed by Jay Hammer, who joined the cast in a two-part episode of the season opener. Allan returns from New Mexico, while his parents return from Syracuse after Tom's father dies. Allan is left the Fortune Warehouse in the will and the relationship between Tom and Allan becomes very cold because of his "happy-go-lucky" attitude. Allan is well known for his sharp rebuttals to George's insults and his well-rounded personality. After the 1978–79 season, Hammer was fired from the show cast, and it was explained that Allan moved to Minnesota. Allan was also chosen to be the godfather of Jenny's daughter Jessica, but when he became snowed in, Harry Bentley was chosen as the proxy.

== Jefferson family ==
=== Mother Olivia Jefferson ===
Mother Jefferson (portrayed by Zara Cully) is Henry and George's mother. Her first appearance was in the All in the Family episode "Lionel's Engagement," when she takes offense at being referred to as "mammy" by Archie Bunker, who thinks the term is a variation of "mommy." Mother Jefferson is a catty, disparaging and antagonistic mother-in-law to Louise, while appearing to be a sweet old lady to everyone else. Mother Jefferson is a stereotypical mother-in-law who thinks her daughter-in-law isn't good enough for George. She would frequently torment Louise by criticizing her cooking, her age or her overall character, but Louise frequently came back at her with a witty albeit sarcastic response. (On a couple of rare occasions, however, Mother Jefferson sides with Louise, when she takes offense at George's boorish or sexist behavior ["George and the Manager"].) In the January 1976 episode "Mother Jefferson's Birthday", it is revealed that Olivia Jefferson was born in February 1901 and that she has a younger sister, Emma, who was born in 1906. On February 9, 1951, both sisters were in a church bingo game in which the prize was an electric blanket, but they quarreled over which card won the prize and didn't speak to each other for 25 years. After her husband was killed in an accident, Olivia supported her two sons by working as a domestic. A long-running gag had Mother Jefferson blissfully ignorant of how much alcohol she actually consumes, usually in the form of a Bloody Mary, which she stated she drank "for the vitamins".

Cully had been absent from the first 17 episodes of the third season because of a serious case of pneumonia caused by a collapsed lung. Upon recovering, she returned for a few episodes, noticeably thinner and more frail. She died early in the fourth season, and the writers decided to eliminate Mother Jefferson's character rather than to replace her with a different actress. No special episode was created centering on her death, but it was briefly referenced in the second episode of the fifth season, "Homecoming (Part 1)".

=== Jenny Jefferson ===
Jenny Willis-Jefferson (portrayed by Berlinda Tolbert, except for her first appearance in All in the Family, when she was portrayed by Lynne Moody) is the only daughter of Helen and Tom Willis, the younger of their two children. Jenny is an intelligent person, finishing college with her boyfriend, Lionel Jefferson. At first, George often disapproved of Jenny loving Lionel merely because she is biracial, or as George called her, a "zebra". However, after George discovered Jenny was pregnant with his grandchild, he changed his ways and became much more accepting of her. In 1976, Jenny married Lionel, though they divorced in 1985 after nine years of marriage. She and Lionel have a daughter named Jessica, played by Erin Hollin and Leslie Hollin (seasons 6–8) and later by Ebonie Smith (seasons 10–11).

At first, Jenny disliked her brother Allan when he came home after two years in Paris, mainly because she turned out "black" and he turned out "white", though they reconcile.

== Others ==
=== Florence Johnston ===
Florence Johnston (Marla Gibbs) is the Jeffersons' wisecracking maid. Her first appearance is in the pilot episode, when she was interviewed and hired as the Jeffersons' housekeeper. She is lazy and not especially good at her job, and she regularly bickers with George, who repeatedly complains about Florence's laziness and cooking, paying her very little (in one episode, he says her cooking tastes like dog food; she replies it should because she's "cooking for a chihuahua"). Several times he was on the verge of firing her, but Louise, who thinks of Florence as one of the family, forces him not to. Originally a recurring character, Gibbs later became part of the core of the series as a regular character appearing in 207 of the 253 episodes.

Despite being a decent Christian woman (as Gibbs is in real life), Florence never kept a long relationship with men. In a second-season episode, Florence contemplates suicide but is talked out of it by George, who shows his humanity despite his gruff exterior.

In an early third-season episode, Florence becomes the Jeffersons' full-time maid, taking Lionel's room after he marries Jenny and finds a place of his own. At first, George refused to allow Florence to move in, but she helped him escape a sham financial deal with a couple of con artists, and George was grateful.

Gibbs starred as Florence in the failed spinoff series Checking In, in which the character became the head of housekeeping for a large hotel. She reprised her role as Florence in 2019 for Live in Front of a Studio Audience.

=== Harry Bentley ===
Harry Bentley (Paul Benedict) is the Jeffersons’ eccentric English next-door neighbor. Bentley works as a Russian-language interpreter at the United Nations. He is known as a kind, gentle fellow, but George mostly finds him to be weird and annoying, frequently slamming the door in his face. A running gag involved George helping Bentley with his back spasms by walking on Bentley's back. Bentley often tells stories about his childhood in England and his bizarre family.

Bentley lives alone, but several times brings home a lady friend. Two of Bentley's most-talked-about ladies are Daphne and Patricia.

Benedict left the series in late 1981 at the start of the eighth season of the sitcom. The character of Bentley was written out, saying he went to live in the Soviet Union for two years. Benedict returned to the show in its final two seasons, when George becomes much friendlier to him.

Stephen Tobolowsky portrayed Bentley in 2019 for Live in Front of a Studio Audience.

=== Ralph Hart ===
Ralph Hart (Ned Wertimer) is the money-crazed doorman of the high-rise Colby East apartment complex. Although he appears to be a hard-working fellow with a decent attitude, he is obsessed with receiving tips.

=== Jimmy ===
Jimmy (Garrett Morris) was supposedly a child that George and Louise has sponsored and sent money to for years. However, in their first visit with Jimmy, they realize he is an adult and a con man.

=== Charlie ===
Charlie (Danny Wells) owns a bar in the first-floor lobby of the Colby East apartment complex. He is usually talkative with his customers, especially the Jeffersons and the Willises.

== George's employees ==
=== Marcus Garvey Henderson ===
Marcus Garvey Henderson (Ernest Harden Jr.) is George's young employee at Jefferson Cleaners. Marcus grew up in a rough neighborhood and steals a jacket from the store on his first day, blaming it on his station in life. However, he becomes a trusted worker.

=== Leroy Daniels ===
Leroy Daniels (Vernon Washington) is George's store manager/employee at Jefferson Cleaners. He was born around 1938 and, though talented at managing the store, is occasionally dimwitted.

=== Hugo ===
Hugo Mojoloweski (Irwin Keyes) is George's occasional bodyguard, who was originally hired by George to protect him from a serial mugger and career criminal nicknamed "Larry The Loon" in Season 7.
