= List of Archie Bunker's Place episodes =

This is a list of episodes of the television series Archie Bunker's Place.

== Series overview ==
| Season | Episodes | Originally released | | Rank | Rating |
| Season | Episodes | First released | Last released | Rank | Rating |
|---|---|---|---|---|---|
| 1 | 24 | September 23, 1979 | March 23, 1980 | 11 | 22.9 |
| 2 | 20 | November 2, 1980 | May 10, 1981 | 13 | 21.4 |
| 3 | 29 | October 4, 1981 | June 1, 1982 (Note: Season 3 officially concluded on May 16, 1982, after which the intended pilot episode for Gloria was broadcast.) | 12 | 21.6 |
| 4 | 24 | September 26, 1982 | April 4, 1983 | 22 | 18.3 (Note: Tied with That's Incredible!.) |

== Episodes ==
=== Season 1 (1979–80) ===
| No. overall | No. in season | Title | Directed by | Written by | Original release date |
|---|---|---|---|---|---|
| 1 | 1 | "Archie's New Partner" | Paul Bogart | Patt Shea & Harriett Weiss | September 23, 1979 |
| 2 | 2 | "Archie's New Partner" | Paul Bogart | Bob Schiller & Bob Weiskopf | September 23, 1979 |
Archie decides to expand his bar, Archie Bunker's Place, into a restaurant. In the meantime, Harry has decided to sell his half of the bar to Jewish liberal Murray Klein. Archie, being the bigot he is, tries in vain to get a loan to buy Harry out. Harry finalizes the sale of his half to Murray Klein, much to Archie's chagrin. However, Archie must come to grips with the fact that he has a new partner. Murray also discovers that there is more to Archie than his bigoted exterior.
| 3 | 3 | "Edith Gets Hired" | Paul Bogart | Patt Shea & Harriett Weiss | September 30, 1979 |
Edith, who has been jobless since she got fired from the Sunshine Home, has gotten a job as recreational assistant at the Rego Park Center for the Mentally Ill. However, Archie has decided that he thinks that Edith should not be working.: Recording date: August 9 & 10, 1979; Note: First of five appearances of Jean Stapleton as Edith Bunker on the show.
| 4 | 4 | "Archie and the Oldest Profession" | Paul Bogart | Bill Larkin & Milt Josefsberg | October 7, 1979 |
Archie's Place has acquired a new regular customer, Dottie. However, Archie and Murray discover that she is a prostitute and is conducting her business at the bar. This is bad for the bar's image. They have to figure out how they can convince her to leave.
| 5 | 5 | "Edith Versus the Energy Crisis" | Paul Bogart | Patt Shea & Harriett Weiss | October 14, 1979 |
The energy crisis has become a big problem. The bar is freezing cold and Edith has been preserving as much energy as possible at home as well. Soon, Archie is suffering as well, when the frigid conditions give him a case of strep throat. Note: Second of five appearances of Jean Stapleton as Edith Bunker on the show.
| 6 | 6 | "Bosom Partners" | Carroll O'Connor and Jon Sharp | Bob Schiller & Bob Weiskopf | October 21, 1979 |
Archie is in trouble with the State of New York when he is charged with non-payment of sales tax and questionable record keeping. Now it's up to Murray to save Archie and the bar by trying to romance the tax agent.
| 7 | 7 | "Building the Restaurant" | Bob LaHendro | Story by : Milt Josefsberg; Teleplay by : Jerry Ross and Bill Larkin | October 28, 1979 |
Construction on the restaurant is underway, but the contractor Archie and Murray hired is demanding more money. Archie, who is determined that the restaurant will be a success, goes to a loan shark.
| 8 | 8 | "The Cook" | Lila Garrett | Story by : Gail Liberti-Kennedy and Richard Baer; Teleplay by : Richard Baer and Milt Josefsberg | November 4, 1979 |
Archie and Murray hire a short-order cook, Veronica Rooney (Anne Meara), but Veronica insists that her gay nephew Fred (Dean Scofield) also be hired on as a waiter, which is a problem given Archie's stance on homosexuality.
| 9 | 9 | "Murray and the Liquor Board" | Dick Martin | Patt Shea & Harriett Weiss | November 11, 1979 |
In a protest march against the use of napalm in Vietnam, Murray punched a cop. Although it has been pardoned, his "criminal record" may cost the bar its liquor license.
| 10 | 10 | "Thanksgiving Reunion" | Paul Bogart | Patt Shea & Harriett Weiss | November 18, 1979 |
| 11 | 11 | "Thanksgiving Reunion" | Paul Bogart | Bob Schiller & Bob Weiskopf | November 18, 1979 |
Mike, Gloria and Joey travel to New York to celebrate Thanksgiving with the Bunkers, but Mike has a terrible secret: he's been fired from his associate professor position at UC Santa Barbara for participating in a nude protest of a nuclear power plant. This has put a further strain on the Stivics' already faltering marriage. The Stivics wonder how they will cope with Mike being unemployed. Mike goes to Archie to air his grievances, and in a show of sympathy and support, he decides to loan him some money until he can find another job. Note: This would be the final time that O'Connor, Stapleton, Rob Reiner and Sally Struthers would appear in-character onscreen together.
| 12 | 12 | "Barney and the Hooker" | Frank Corsaro | Bob Schiller & Bob Weiskopf | November 25, 1979 |
Dottie (from episode three) has been arrested for prostitution. Murray bails her out and talks Archie into hiring her as a waitress to try to keep her out of trouble. However, trouble finds her when recently divorced Barney Hefner falls in love and proposes.
| 13 | 13 | "Man of the Year" | Carroll O'Connor and Jon Sharp | George Balzer & Sam Perrin | December 2, 1979 |
An old high school buddy of Archie's (who is also a con man) comes to town to inform Archie that he has been elected Man of the Year.: Recording date: November 15 & 16, 1979
| 14 | 14 | "The Shabbat Dinner" | Paul Bogart | Bob Schiller & Bob Weiskopf | December 9, 1979 |
Edith and Stephanie are preparing a Shabbat dinner, a dinner eaten on the Jewish sabbath. They invite Archie's partner, Murray and his non-Jewish girlfriend. Unbeknownst to him, Edith also invites his mother, who feels that Murray should only be dating Jewish women. Note: Fifth and final appearance of Jean Stapleton as Edith Bunker.
| 15 | 15 | "Barney's Lawsuit" | Lila Garrett | Story by : Milt Josefsberg and Jerry Ross; Teleplay by : Jerry Ross | December 16, 1979 |
When Barney's bar stool collapses while he is sitting on it, Archie is afraid he will try to sue.
| 16 | 16 | "Blanche and Murray" | Peter Bonerz | Bob Schiller & Bob Weiskopf | December 30, 1979 |
Barney's ex-wife Blanche (Estelle Parsons) comes back to town, and is as sex-crazy as ever. She now goes after Murray, infuriating Barney.
| 17 | 17 | "Murray's Daughter" | Carroll O'Connor and Jon Sharp | Carroll O'Connor and Patt Shea & Harriett Weiss | January 6, 1980 |
Murray's estranged daughter suddenly shows up with a Puerto Rican husband and children on the way. Note: Murray's daughter is played by Martin Balsam's real-life daughter, Talia Balsam.
| 18 | 18 | "The Ambush" | Peter Bonerz | Bob Schiller & Bob Weiskopf | January 27, 1980 |
The neighborhood has had a sudden rash of burglaries, and Archie and Murray are afraid the bar will be the next target.
| 19 | 19 | "The Return of Sammy" | Dick Martin | Bill Larkin and Richard Baer | February 3, 1980 |
Archie's "old friend" Sammy Davis Jr. is in town appearing on a talk show. Archie calls him up and invites him to the bar.: Recording date: January 10 & 11, 1980; Note: This episode is a sequel of sorts to the All in the Family episode "Sammy's Visit."
| 20 | 20 | "Archie Fixes Up Fred" | Dick Martin | Story by : Gail Liberti-Kennedy; Teleplay by : Patt Shea & Harriett Weiss | February 10, 1980 |
Some of Archie's customers have been making rude remarks about Veronica's gay nephew Fred (Dean Scofield), so Archie figures that he can "convert" Fred by setting him up on a date with a pretty girl.
| 21 | 21 | "Father and Daughter Night" | Dick Martin | Bob Schiller & Bob Weiskopf | February 17, 1980 |
Murray steps in when Archie refuses to appear in the father/daughter talent show at Stephanie's school.
| 22 | 22 | "Van Ranseleer's Operation" | Joe Gannon | Story by : Bill Larkin and Richard Baer; Teleplay by : Patt Shea & Harriett Weiss | March 2, 1980 |
When Archie and the guys at the bar read in the paper that there might be a cure for Mr. Van Ranseleer's blindness, they pool their efforts and money so he can have the operation.
| 23 | 23 | "Veronica's Ex" | Jon Sharp | Larry Rhine & Mel Tolkin | March 9, 1980 |
Veronica's ex-husband Carmine (played by Anne Meara's husband Jerry Stiller) comes back to town, and Veronica falls for him all over again.
| 24 | 24 | "A Small Mafia Favor" | Alex March | Story by : Nate Monaster; Teleplay by : Larry Rhine & Mel Tolkin | March 23, 1980 |
An old friend of Murray's comes to visit, but he's also a crime kingpin. When Murray unknowingly signals the death of a rival mob boss, Archie fears retaliation. Note: Final appearance of Danny Dayton as Hank Pivnik

=== Season 2 (1980–81) ===
| No. overall | No. in season | Title | Directed by | Written by | Original release date |
|---|---|---|---|---|---|
| 25 | 1 | "Archie Alone" | Carroll O'Connor and Gary Shimokawa | Stephen A. Miller & Mark Fink | November 2, 1980 |
| 26 | 2 | "Archie Alone" | Carroll O'Connor and Gary Shimokawa | Fred Rubin & Alan Rosen | November 2, 1980 |
Archie struggles to cope with the death of his beloved wife, Edith. A month earlier, Edith had suffered a fatal stroke in her sleep. A stunned Archie rebuffs efforts from his friends to help him grieve. Archie's refusal to grieve over Edith's sudden death continues to take its toll on his friends and family ... until one day he happens to go into their bedroom and sees one of Edith's slippers.: Recording date: October 16, 17 & 18, 1980
| 27 | 3 | "Home Again" | Peter Bonerz | Duncan Scott McGibbon | November 9, 1980 |
Due to painful memories of Edith's death, Archie considers selling the home and getting an apartment.
| 28 | 4 | "Hiring the Housekeeper" | Peter Bonerz | Story by : Carroll O'Connor; Teleplay by : Fred Rubin & Alan Rosen | November 16, 1980 |
Archie hires Ellen Canby, sister of his next door neighbor, as his new housekeeper.
| 29 | 5 | "The Wildcat Strike" | Mel Ferber | Stephen A. Miller & Mark Fink | November 23, 1980 |
A pushy new waitress encourages everyone to go on strike until Archie agrees to unionize.
| 30 | 6 | "Veronica and the Health Inspector" | Marlene Laird | Patt Shea & Harriett Weiss | November 30, 1980 |
Veronica begins a whirlwind romance with the local health inspector, a man young enough to be her son.
| 31 | 7 | "Murray's Wife" | Joe Gannon | Patt Shea & Harriett Weiss | December 7, 1980 |
When Murray and his ex-wife rekindle their relationship, she plans to turn the restaurant into an English pub. Murray soon realizes why they split up in the first place.
| 32 | 8 | "The Camping Trip" | Charlotte Brown | Story by : Alan Rosen; Teleplay by : Fred Rubin & Alan Rosen | December 14, 1980 |
Stephanie's club plans a camping trip, and Archie's been signed to chaperone without his knowledge.
| 33 | 9 | "The Incident" | Gary Shimokawa | Stephen A. Miller & Mark Fink | December 21, 1980 |
Archie punches a lodge member after he makes racial remarks about Mrs. Canby, his black housekeeper, during a confrontation at the grocery store. Archie must write him a written apology or face expulsion from the lodge.
| 34 | 10 | "Custody: Part 1" | Joe Gannon | Patt Shea & Harriett Weiss | January 4, 1981 |
Stephanie's wealthy grandmother appears and sues Archie for custody.
| 35 | 11 | "Custody: Part 2" | Joe Gannon | Patt Shea & Harriett Weiss | January 11, 1981 |
Archie fights for legal custody of Stephanie.
| 36 | 12 | "Barney the Gambler" | Gary Shimokawa | Duncan Scott McGibbon | February 1, 1981 |
Barney gets carried away and is in hot water when he hits a lucky streak betting on the horses.
| 37 | 13 | "Murray Klein's Place" | Gary Shimokawa | Fred Rubin & Alan Rosen | February 15, 1981 |
Fed up with Archie not listening to his ideas, Murray wants to end their partnership.
| 38 | 14 | "Weekend Away" | Gary Shimokawa | Stephen A. Miller & Mark Fink | February 22, 1981 |
Archie and Murray go off to a convention. Murray soon finds himself tied up and robbed by a woman he invites over to the room.
| 39 | 15 | "Stephanie's Science Project" | Joe Gannon | Steve Kreinberg & Andy Guerdat | March 8, 1981 |
Archie tricks the bar's regulars into helping construct Stephanie's science project.
| 40 | 16 | "Tough Love" | Linda Day | Patt Shea & Harriett Weiss | March 15, 1981 |
When Veronica's drinking gets out of control and even interferes with her work, Archie must take drastic measures.
| 41 | 17 | "The Trashing of the Temple" | Linda Day | Fred Rubin & Alan Rosen | March 29, 1981 |
Stephanie's temple is the latest in a string of vandalisms, leading a frightened Archie to withdraw her.: Recording date: March 19 & 20, 1981
| 42 | 18 | "La Cage Aux Bunker" | Gary Shimokawa | Story by : Carroll O'Connor; Teleplay by : Duncan Scott McGibbon | April 5, 1981 |
Archie reluctantly takes Stephanie's music teacher on a date in a bid to get her into the school chorus.
| 43 | 19 | "Death of a Saint" | Joe Gannon | Patt Shea & Harriett Weiss | May 3, 1981 |
Murray's mother dies while he is on a date with his fiance, leaving him with a guilty conscience.
| 44 | 20 | "Goodbye, Murray" | Joe Gannon | Patt Shea & Harriett Weiss | May 10, 1981 |
Murray and his fiance marry and move to California.

=== Season 3 (1981–82) ===
| No. overall | No. in season | Title | Directed by | Written by | Original release date |
|---|---|---|---|---|---|
| 45 | 1 | "Billie" | Linda Day | Patt Shea & Harriett Weiss | October 4, 1981 |
Archie's niece Billie (Denise Miller) shows up with a story too sad for Archie to resist.
| 46 | 2 | "The Business Manager" | Joe Gannon | Stephen A. Miller & Mark Fink | October 4, 1981 |
When the restaurant is in financial ruin due to Archie's lackluster business sense, his lawyer hires him a business manager, against Archie's strong objections.
| 47 | 3 | "The Date" | Gary Shimokawa | Fred Rubin & Alan Rosen | October 11, 1981 |
Billie accepts a date with Archie's accountant to get under Archie's skin because of his over-protectiveness.
| 48 | 4 | "Norma Rae Bunker" | Gary Shimokawa | Steve Kreinberg & Andy Guerdat | October 18, 1981 |
In an effort to make a little extra money, Mrs. Canby gets a job from home sewing clothes for a sweatshop. When she is cheated out of half her pay, Archie goes to bat for her.
| 49 | 5 | "Harry's Investment" | Charlotte Brown | Story by : Bruce Gilbert and Jeffrey Ferro & Fredric Weiss; Teleplay by : Jeffrey Ferro & Fredric Weiss | October 25, 1981 |
Archie wants Harry to buy back Murray's share of the bar. Both Harry's wife and Archie are upset to learn Harry invested in McFeeney's, a competitor (and topless) bar and grill.
| 50 | 6 | "Three's a Crowd" | Linda Day | Steve Kreinberg & Andy Guerdat | November 8, 1981 |
When Archie goes to dinner with Barney and his date, she has eyes for Archie instead. Archie feels the same way, but is hesitant so soon after losing Edith.
| 51 | 7 | "Happy Birthday, Stephanie" | Gary Shimokawa | Stephen A. Miller & Mark Fink | November 15, 1981 |
Archie objects to Stephanie going to a rock concert after Billie gives her the tickets for her birthday.
| 52 | 8 | "Growing Up Is Hard to Do: Part 1" | Joe Gannon | Jeffrey Ferro & Fredric Weiss | November 29, 1981 |
Tensions rise when Stephanie's father reappears in the days leading up to her Bat Mitzvah.
| 53 | 9 | "Growing Up Is Hard to Do: Part 2" | Joe Gannon | Jeffrey Ferro & Fredric Weiss | December 6, 1981 |
Tensions reach a boiling point when Archie catches Stephanie's father stealing her Bat Mitzvah money.
| 54 | 10 | "Stephanie's Dance" | Linda Day | Stephen A. Miller & Mark Fink | December 20, 1981 |
Archie must accept the fact that Stephanie is growing up when she attends her first school dance.
| 55 | 11 | "The Photo Contest" | Joe Gannon | Jeffrey Ferro & Fredric Weiss | December 27, 1981 |
Stephanie enters some candid photos of Archie in a photography contest.
| 56 | 12 | "Stephanie's Tryout" | Linda Day | Jeffrey Ferro & Fredric Weiss | January 10, 1982 |
Stephanie hopes to make the school baseball team.
| 57 | 13 | "The Night Visitor" | Linda Day | Andy Borowitz | January 17, 1982 |
When he becomes homeless. Raoul spends nights in the storeroom, leading everyone to believe they're the victims of petty thieves.
| 58 | 14 | "Reggie, 3; Archie, 0" | Gary Shimokawa | Fred Rubin & Alan Rosen | January 24, 1982 |
Archie buys a used pickup truck for the restaurant, and José backs it into millionaire Reggie Jackson's Rolls-Royce.: Recording date: December 10 & 11, 1981
| 59 | 15 | "Blind Man's Bluff" | Joe Gannon | Story by : Ron Allen Thompson and Patt Shea & Harriett Weiss; Teleplay by : Patt Shea & Harriett Weiss | January 31, 1982 |
Blind Mr. Van Ranseleer is mugged by a customer at the bar who overhears Van Ranseleer is carrying a sum of money on him. It's now up to Archie and the staff to help him get out of his apartment when he becomes fearful of being attacked again.
| 60 | 16 | "A Blast from the Past" | Gary Shimokawa | Andy Borowitz | February 7, 1982 |
Archie wants Billie to date her ex-boyfriend. Billie decides to use Gary as a way to turn her ex-boyfriend away, telling him she and Gary are dating.
| 61 | 17 | "Sex and the Single Parent" | Linda Day | Story by : Jill Gordon and Stephen A. Miller & Mark Fink; Teleplay by : Stephen A. Miller & Mark Fink | February 21, 1982 |
Old world Archie refuses to let Stephanie participate in her school's sex education program, until he overhears a conversation between Stephanie, Billie and one of Stephanie's friends.
| 62 | 18 | "Gloria Comes Home" | Carroll O'Connor and Gary Shimokawa | Patt Shea & Harriett Weiss | February 28, 1982 |
| 63 | 19 | "Gloria Comes Home" | Carroll O'Connor and Gary Shimokawa | Patt Shea & Harriett Weiss | February 28, 1982 |
Gloria (Sally Struthers) and Joey return home. Archie learns Gloria left the Meathead because he joined a commune in California, where he was living with other women. Gloria is determined to make it on her own. Archie has mixed emotions when Gloria announces she has found work as a veterinary assistant and will be moving into a place of her own in upstate New York. This episode sets up the spin-off Gloria. Note: Final appearance of Barbara Meek as Ellen Canby
| 64 | 20 | "Of Mice and Bunker" | Nick Havinga | Fred Rubin & Alan Rosen | March 7, 1982 |
Archie takes on a new partner (Joe Mantegna) who has plans to squeeze Archie out of his ownership of the bar.
| 65 | 21 | "Relapse" | Linda Day | Patt Shea & Harriett Weiss | March 14, 1982 |
Veronica's ex-husband (Jerry Stiller) returns and urges Veronica to start drinking again after a year of sobriety. Note: Final appearance of Anne Meara as Veronica Rooney
| 66 | 22 | "Love Is Hell" | Gary Shimokawa | Lewis Colick | March 21, 1982 |
A boy Stephanie likes has a crush on her cousin Billie instead of her.
| 67 | 23 | "The Second Time Around" | Gabrielle Beaumont | Jeffrey Ferro & Fredric Weiss | March 28, 1982 |
Katherine Logan (from the earlier episode "Three's a Crowd") drops by at the bar, and a romantic relationship between her and Archie ensues (complicated, at first, by bad advice Barney gives Archie).: Recording date: Feb 4 & 5, 1982
| 68 | 24 | "West Side Astoria" | Tony Singletary | Andy Borowitz | April 4, 1982 |
Katherine invites Archie to supper with her parents, which turns into a disaster when they meet prejudiced Archie.
| 69 | 25 | "Billie Moves Out" | Gary Shimokawa | Stephen A. Miller & Mark Fink | April 25, 1982 |
Billie is tired of Archie over-protecting her so she moves in with a secret roommate — Gary Rabinowitz.
| 70 | 26 | "Rabinowitz's Brother" | Linda Day | Fred Rubin & Alan Rosen | May 2, 1982 |
Archie fires Gary as his business manager, but soon learns to regret it when Gary is replaced by his brother Barry.
| 71 | 27 | "Death of a Lodger" | Carroll O'Connor and Gary Shimokawa | Steve Kreinberg & Andy Guerdat | May 9, 1982 |
Barney takes in a cranky and overbearing border (Don Rickles) to help pay some bills.: Recording date: March 4 & 5 1982
| 72 | 28 | "The Battle of Bunker III" | Nick Havinga | Steve Kreinberg & Andy Guerdat | May 16, 1982 |
Stephanie becomes very jealous as Archie's relationship with Katherine progresses.
| 73 | 29 | "Gloria: The First Day" | Paul Bogart | Patt Shea & Harriett Weiss and Joe Gannon | June 1, 1982 |
Archie appears at the beginning of this episode in which he drives Gloria and Joey to their new place. Gloria finds out she has a lot to learn to be a veterinary assistant, but Dr. Adams is willing to help her along. Note: This episode was the pilot for the related series Gloria.

=== Season 4 (1982–83) ===
| No. overall | No. in season | Title | Directed by | Written by | Original release date |
|---|---|---|---|---|---|
| 74 | 1 | "Archie's Night Out" | Nick Havinga | Stephen A. Miller | September 26, 1982 |
Archie reluctantly goes to a singles bar with Barney and Mr. Van Ranseleer, who picks up a lady.: Recording date: August 12 & 13, 1982
| 75 | 2 | "Gary's Ex" | Will Mackenzie | Mark Fink | October 3, 1982 |
Gary's ex-girlfriend visits and demands attention from him, upsetting Billie.
| 76 | 3 | "The Eyewitnesses" | Gary Shimokawa | Steve Kreinberg & Andy Guerdat | October 10, 1982 |
José and Raoul witness a mugging behind the restaurant but are afraid to come forward because they are illegal aliens.
| 77 | 4 | "Double Date" | Joe Gannon | Mara Lideks | October 17, 1982 |
Archie won't let Stephanie go on a date, so Billie agrees to go along with Gary and make it a double date so Stephanie can go out.
| 78 | 5 | "From the Waldorf to Astoria" | Gary Shimokawa | Stephen Schneck & Marley Sims | October 24, 1982 |
When José's artistic talents come out, they hold an art show in the bar.: Recording date: September 16 & 17, 1982
| 79 | 6 | "Stay Out of My Briefs" | Gary Shimokawa | Fred Rubin & Alan Rosen | October 31, 1982 |
Billie gets a job as Gary's new secretary.
| 80 | 7 | "Break a Leg, Stephanie" | Linda Day | Richard Freiman | November 7, 1982 |
Stephanie hopes to attend an exclusive music school, but Archie is reluctant to let her do so.: Recording date: October 7 & 8, 1982
| 81 | 8 | "Archie Gets a Head" | Gary Shimokawa | Barry Fanaro & Mort Nathan | November 21, 1982 |
Archie wants his own bathroom in the basement; the contractors are too expensive, so he hires José and Raul to do the job.: Recording date: October 13 & 14, 1982
| 82 | 9 | "Barney Gets Laid Off" | Linda Day | David Angell | November 28, 1982 |
Billie talks Archie into giving unemployed Barney a job at the bar, which they soon regret. Barney's employment at the bar soon turns into disaster, and Archie must find a way to tell Barney he's fired.: Recording date: November 11 & 12, 1982
| 83 | 10 | "Marriage on the Rocks" | Alan Myerson | Steve Kreinberg & Andy Guerdat | December 12, 1982 |
Harry's wife kicks him out of the house, so Archie offers him his date.: Recording date: November 4 & 5, 1982
| 84 | 11 | "Father Christmas" | Gary Shimokawa | Stephen A. Miller | December 19, 1982 |
Billie is bitter when her estranged father comes for a Christmas visit, until she finds out the real reason her mother left.: Recording date: December 2 & 3, 1982
| 85 | 12 | "Teacher's Pet" | Joe Gannon | Bob Rosenfarb | December 26, 1982 |
Billie's philosophy teacher makes passes at her.
| 86 | 13 | "Captain Video" | Alan Myerson | Story by : Stephen A. Miller & Mark Fink; Teleplay by : Stephen Schneck & Marley Sims | January 2, 1983 |
Lonely Barney enlists the help of a video dating service.: Recording date: December 9 & 10, 1982
| 87 | 14 | "The Promotion" | Nick Havinga | Mara Lideks | January 9, 1983 |
After using CPR to save his uncle's life, Gary is considered for partnership in the family law firm.: Recording date: September 30 & October 1, 1982
| 88 | 15 | "Three Women" | Joe Gannon | Lou Messina & Diane Messina Stanley | January 16, 1983 |
Stephanie expresses her anger about the fact that her grandmother refuses to discuss her deceased mother. Note: Final appearance of Celeste Holm as Estelle Harris
| 89 | 16 | "Relief Bartender" | Alan Bergmann | Story by : Alan Rosen & Fred Rubin; Teleplay by : David Angell | January 23, 1983 |
Archie reluctantly hires a female bartender to help out Harry, but when he fires her unfairly, she files a discrimination lawsuit. Gary advises Archie to give her the job back.: Recording date: January 6 & 7, 1983
| 90 | 17 | "The Red Herring" | Gary Shimokawa | Steve Kreinberg & Andy Guerdat | January 30, 1983 |
Archie is shocked and angered when he finds out his close friend, Mr. Van Ranseleer, may have been a member of the communist party.: Recording date: January 19 & 20, 1983
| 91 | 18 | "The Boys' Night Out" | Oz Scott | Mark Fink | February 13, 1983 |
The boys' night out for Archie, Barney and Harry could turn into one of the wrong kind once they get caught in a gay nightclub.: Recording date: February 3 & 4, 1983
| 92 | 19 | "I Can Manage" | Oz Scott | Fred Rubin | February 20, 1983 |
Archie falls hard for a woman he meets at a restaurant convention, unaware that she is married.
| 93 | 20 | "Store Wars" | Carroll O'Connor and Gary Shimokawa | Alan Rosen | February 27, 1983 |
Murray returns to recoup his investment in the bar. Archie gives him a hard luck story, and Murray allows Archie six more months to get his share of the bar sold.: Recording date: February 10 & 11, 1983; Note: Final appearance of Martin Balsam as Murray Klein
| 94 | 21 | "Bunker Madness" | Linda Day | Steve Kreinberg & Andy Guerdat | March 13, 1983 |
Stephanie is using marijuana to fit in with her friends. When Archie finds the drug in his basement, he hits the ceiling and Billie takes the blame for Stephanie. Stephanie tells Archie the truth when he finds some boys smoking upstairs in the bathroom at her party.
| 95 | 22 | "No One Said It Was Easy" | Alan Rosen | Joe Gannon | March 20, 1983 |
When depressed Gary has a bout with alcoholism, Billie is torn about whether or not to continue her relationship with him.: Recording date: March 3 & 4, 1983
| 96 | 23 | "Small Claims Court" | Gary Shimokawa | Stephen A. Miller | March 28, 1983 |
Barney and Archie square off in court over a TV that Archie purchased from Barney at an electronics store and that Barney accidentally broke while installing at the bar. Note: Final appearance of Allan Melvin as Barney Hefner
| 97 | 24 | "I'm Torn Here" | Gail Liberti-Kennedy | Story by : Fred Rubin & Alan Rosen; Teleplay by : Fred Rubin | April 4, 1983 |
Gary is jealous when he learns his old school rival (Joe Penny) is dating his ex-girlfriend Billie. Gary tells her he would like to start dating her again, but she wants them to remain just friends. Note: Final appearance of Carroll O'Connor as Archie Bunker, Jason Wingreen as Harry Snowden, Danielle Brisebois as Stephanie Mills, and Bill Quinn as Mr. Van Ranseleer.

== See also ==
- List of All in the Family episodes
