= Abu Abed =

Abu Abed is a fictional character that forms the centerpiece of many jokes in Lebanon, though he is known throughout the Arab world. The Washington Post describes him as an "Archie Bunker-like figure who is a fumbling caricature of all the failings of the Lebanese." His full name is sometimes given as Abu Abed El Beyrouty and he is also called Abul Abed or Abu El-Abed.

In illustrations, Abu Abed's most notable features are a large mustache and the red fez he wears on his head. Abu Abed's best friend is Abu Steif, with whom he spends much of the day in the Kahwat El Ejeez قهوة القزاز, an actual and well-known coffee shop in central Beirut. He is sometimes claimed to be a Sunni Beiruti. One example of the literally hundreds of jokes with Abu Abed is:

Abu Abed went once to a whore-house and found his wife working there so he said to himself: Thank God for saving me from committing any sin today.... There is nothing better for a man than his own wife..!

During the 2006 Israel-Lebanon conflict, the most widely told joke among Lebanese was again about Abu Abed. The jokes goes: Abu Abed is sitting in the cafe when he calls Ehud Olmert, Prime Minister of Israel, to tell him not to come north of the border or he and four of his friends will give Israel trouble. Olmert laughs and tells Abu Abed that one Israeli battalion can easily overrun his neighborhood. This verbal contest escalates until Abu Abed says that he has collected thousands of fighters armed with shoulder-fired rockets and Olmert states that Israel has two million soldiers. "'Two million?' asks Abul Abed. 'In that case I am going to have to surrender. We simply do not have enough room to keep 2 million hostages.'"
