= Abraham Alvarez =

Abraham Alvarez may refer to:

- Abe Alvarez, American baseball coach and pitcher
- Abraham Alvarez (actor), American film and television actor
