= Gloria (American TV series) =

American television sitcom (1982–1983)

- Genre: Sitcom
- Created by: Joe Gannon; Patt Shea; Harriett Weiss
- Developed by: Dan Guntzelman; Steve Marshall
- Directed by: Bob Claver
- Starring: Sally Struthers; Burgess Meredith; Jo de Winter; Lou Richards; Christian Jacobs
- Country of origin: United States
- Original language: English
- No. of seasons: 1
- No. of episodes: 21 (and 1 pilot (aired as Archie Bunker's Place S3 Ep29))

Production
- Executive producers: Dan Guntzelman; Steve Marshall
- Editors: Andy Ackerman; Marco Zappia
- Camera setup: Multi-camera
- Running time: 22–24 minutes
- Production company: Tandem Productions

Original release
- Network: CBS
- Release: September 26, 1982 – April 10, 1983

Related
- All in the Family; Archie Bunker's Place; Maude; The Jeffersons; 704 Hauser; Good Times; Checking In

Gloria is an American television sitcom and a spin-off of Archie Bunker's Place that aired on CBS from September 26, 1982, to April 10, 1983. The series stars Sally Struthers reprising her role as Gloria Stivic, the daughter of Archie Bunker on All in the Family.

== Synopsis ==
The set-up of the show was that Gloria had been left at loose ends after her husband, Michael "Meathead" Stivic, who did not appear in the new series, left her for one of his students and moved to a commune; the separation was initially revealed in an episode of Archie Bunker's Place which aired in February 1982. Gloria, to be closer to her now-widowed father, decided to move with her young son, Joey (played by Christian Jacobs), and pick up the pieces of her life by returning to New York City from California. However, Gloria, not wanting to raise Joey in the city, decides to take a job as an assistant to two veterinarians in the fictitious upstate town of Fox Ridge. The veterinarians were played by Burgess Meredith and Jo de Winter; the character played by Meredith was also Gloria's landlord.

CBS chose not to renew Gloria for a second season, despite the fact that the show ranked 18th for the season. After the final first-run telecast on CBS in April 1983, the series also went into reruns Wednesdays from June 29 through September 21, 1983.

== Pilot ==
CBS rejected Gloria's original pilot which features a brief cameo by Carroll O'Connor as Archie Bunker dropping off Gloria and Joey at Dr. Adams' clinic and residence. It was instead aired as a backdoor pilot episode within Archie Bunker's Place. This pilot was written by veteran All in the Family and Archie Bunker's Place writers Pat Shea and Harriett Weiss and Archie Bunker's Place producer and close Carroll O'Connor associate Joe Gannon who co-created, wrote and produced the pilot. They were replaced by former WKRP in Cincinnati writers Steve Marshall and Dan Guntzelman (who would later find success writing and producing the long-running ABC sitcom Growing Pains as well as creating and producing its spin-off show, Just the Ten of Us).

The show's production was moved from CBS Television City to Universal Studios. According to a December 1982 feature interview with Sally Struthers in TV Guide, this did not sit well with Carroll O'Connor who, with the rest of the Archie Bunker's Place production staff, was effectively shut out of the production of Gloria (even Norman Lear, who created All in the Family and had some hand in all of its other spin-offs, had no credited involvement in Gloria). After this, O'Connor chose to be uninvolved in the retooled pilot and series. The characters of Dr. Jim Waynewrite and Ben the handyman were dropped when Marshall and Guntzelman's second pilot was made, which went to series. In the second pilot, Joey adopted a black dog that he named Archie after his grandfather, which O'Connor was said to be less than thrilled about, according to the same 1982 TV Guide article. In the original pilot, actress Jo de Winter's character, Maggie Lawrence, is an assistant to Dr. Adams. In the second pilot and the series, Maggie Lawrence is a veterinarian and Dr. Adams' partner in the clinic.

== Cast ==
- Sally Struthers as Gloria Bunker Stivic
- Burgess Meredith as Dr. Willard Adams
- Jo de Winter as Dr. Maggie Lawrence
- Christian Jacobs as Joey Stivic
- Lou Richards as Clark V. Uhley, Jr.

== Episodes ==
=== Backdoor pilot (1982) ===
A backdoor pilot, entitled "Gloria: The First Day", was originally aired as the 29th and final episode of the third season of Archie Bunker's Place in the syndication package. It aired on TV Land on March 12, 2003.

Title	Directed by	Written by	Original release date
"Gloria: The First Day"	Paul Bogart	Patt Shea, Harriett Weiss & Joe Gannon	June 1, 1982
Gloria begins her new job at a veterinarian's clinic while adjusting to life as a single mother.

=== Season 1 (1982–83) ===
No.	Title	Directed by	Written by	Original release date
1	"The First Day"	Bob Claver	Dan Guntzelman & Steve Marshall	September 26, 1982
Gloria Bunker-Stivic returns home to raise her son Joey on her own and works as an assistant to the absent-minded veterinarian Dr. Willard Adams.
2	"First Date"	Bob Claver	Rich Reinhart	October 3, 1982
Gloria reluctantly goes on her first date since her senior prom.
3	"Bully for You"	Bob Claver	Dan Guntzelman & Steve Marshall	October 10, 1982
Gloria tries to stop Joey from fighting a bully.
4	"If At First You Don't Succeed"	Bob Claver	Dan Guntzelman & Steve Marshall	October 17, 1982
Gloria and Dr. Adams make a near-fatal mistake on an emergency call.
5	"Pig in a Blanket"	Bob Claver	Lissa Levin	October 24, 1982
Gloria cares for a piglet, which makes Clark and Joey jealous.
6	"Teacher's Pet"	Bob Claver	Lissa Levin	October 31, 1982
Dr. Adams is the substitute teacher as Gloria takes a test in her vet-assistant class.
7	"Malpractice"	Bob Claver	Rich Reinhart	November 7, 1982
Maggie realizes her mistake when she refuses a lawyer's toaster oven as payment for treating his monkey.
8	"F-F-Father's Day"	Bob Claver	Story by : Lew Levy & Michael Cassutt; Teleplay by : Rich Reinhart	November 21, 1982
Clark tells his father he is engaged to Gloria.
9	"The Taxman Cometh"	Bob Claver	Tim O'Donnell	November 28, 1982
Gloria signs Dr. Adams up for Social Security, but the computer has declared him deceased.
10	"Still Life with Cat"	Bob Claver	Frederick Hoffman	December 12, 1982
Joey wants Gloria to retrieve his friend's cat from the house of a woman who is said to use pets for potting soil and bake children in her oven.
11	"Miracle at Fox Ridge"	Bob Claver	Lissa Levin	December 19, 1982
Joey may not have a merry Christmas if he learns his father has not sent him the bicycle he wants.
12	"Visitation"	Bob Claver	Tim O'Donnell	December 26, 1982
Joey agrees to visit his father, but he is not on the plane when it lands in California.
13	"Gloria on the Couch"	Bob Claver	Rich Reinhart	January 9, 1983
Gloria is the victim of an armed robbery, but she is unable to recall a single detail.
14	"Love in the Past Tents"	Bob Claver	Story by : Max Tash; Teleplay by : Lissa Levin	January 16, 1983
Maggie sees an old flame while on a "house call" to a traveling circus - Boffo the Clown.
15	"Truth and Consequences"	Bob Claver	Tim O'Donnell	January 23, 1983
The staff of the clinic face their mortality and confess their innermost feeling when a plague-ridden squirrel puts them in quarantine.
16	"Let's Call the Whole Thing Off"	Bob Claver	Lissa Levin	February 13, 1983
Dr. Adams' girlfriend plans to marry someone else.
17	"Death Row Dog"	Bob Claver	Jurgen Wolff	February 20, 1983
Gloria is delighted with the reward she is getting for finding a recently deceased client's dog, but she soon learns the dog's role in the old woman's funeral plans.
18	"Coming Apart"	Bob Claver	Dan Guntzelman & Steve Marshall	February 27, 1983
Gloria gets depressed when she receives her final divorce papers.
19	"It Almost Happened One Night"	Bob Claver	Melody Rowland	March 13, 1983
Gloria and Clark are forced to share a room at a honeymoon hotel when their car breaks down.
20	"Class Struggle"	Bob Claver	Story by : Rich Reinhart & Tim O'Donnell; Teleplay by : Tim O'Donnell	April 3, 1983
Gloria does a sit-in to protest the budget cuts affecting the vet-assistant class.
21	"An Uncredited Woman"	Bob Claver	Story by : Tim O'Donnell & Rich Reinhart; Teleplay by : Rich Reinhart	April 10, 1983
Gloria learns that she lost her credit rating in the divorce.
