= Abraham Alvarez (actor) =

American film and television actor

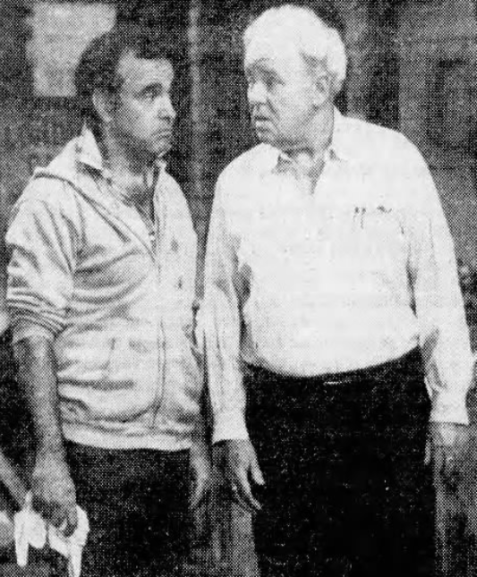
- Alvarez (left) with Carroll O'Connor, 1983
- Born: November 3, 1944 (age 81); New York, U.S.
- Occupation: Actor
- Years active: 1975–2019

Abraham Alvarez (born November 3, 1944) is an American film and television actor. He is best known for playing Jose Perez, the beleaguered cook in the American sitcom television series Archie Bunker's Place.

Alvarez guest-starred in television programs including CBS Summer Playhouse, Knots Landing, T. J. Hooker, Buck Rogers in the 25th Century, Emergency!, Wonder Woman, The Bionic Woman and The Adventures of Brisco County, Jr., and played the recurring role of Judge Augustus Triandos in the NBC police drama television series Reasonable Doubts. He also appeared in films such as Alien Nation, Baby Blue Marine, Predator 2 and The Panama Deception.
