= Jo de Winter =

American actress (1921–2016)

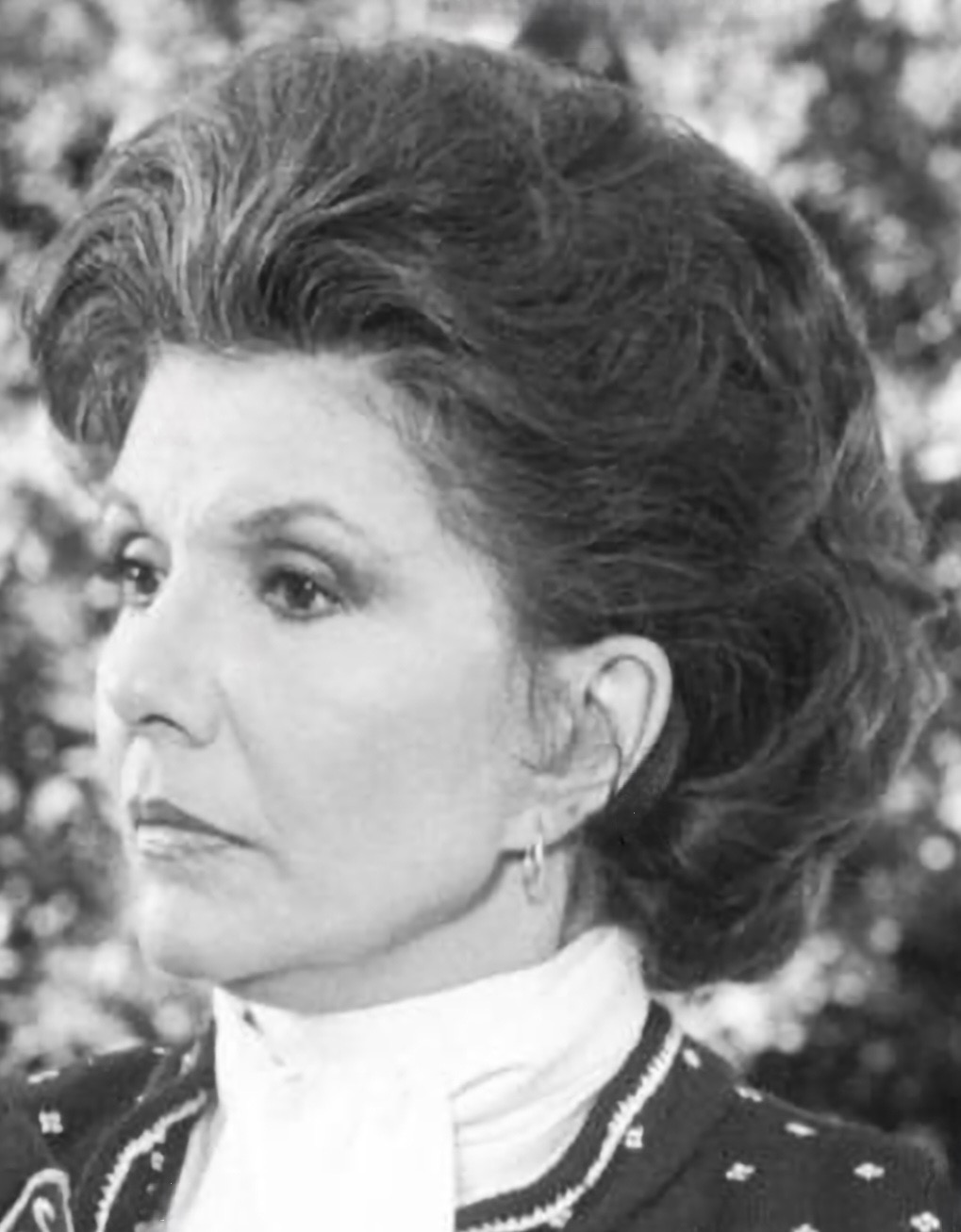
- Jo de Winter in B. J. and the Bear, 1981
- Born: Juanita Maria-Johana Daussat; March 5, 1921; Sacramento, California, U.S.
- Died: January 17, 2016 (aged 94)
- Occupation: Actress
- Years active: 1965–2002; 2016
- Spouse: Robert Eggers Adamina (m. 1941)
- Children: 2

Juanita Adamina (born Juanita Maria-Johana Daussat; March 5, 1921 – January 17, 2016), known professionally as Jo de Winter, was an American actress most notable for her role in the short-lived television series Gloria.

== Early life and education ==
De Winter studied at the Dominican Convent school in San Rafael, California. Her first acting experience came at age 4, when she played an injured shepherd in a Christmas pageant at the school. She attended the College of the Pacific. She also took acting classes with Ben Bard.

== Career ==
=== Stage ===
De Winter appeared on Broadway as Mrs. Norman in Children of a Lesser God, and in Europe onstage in One Flew Over the Cuckoo's Nest as Nurse Ratched, a role that she originated in the play's production in San Francisco. She was praised for offering "intellectual humor... with a straight face" when she appeared in Wendy Wasserstein's Isn't it Romantic in Los Angeles in 1984.

=== Film and television ===
David O. Selznick scouted Juanita Daussat when she was in a college play; she was one of the many actresses who auditioned for the role of Scarlett O'Hara in Gone with the Wind. While her husband was stationed in Rome, she helped to translate English-language films for Italian audiences, and provided vocal acting for some film dubbing; she also appeared in two films made in Italy, The Pirates of Capri and The Dark Road. She later appeared in the films Dirty Harry and Breakin' 2: Electric Boogaloo.

For three years, De Winter had a recurring role as an executive secretary in The Name of the Game. She was in the regular cast of the sitcom Gloria, a short-lived spin-off of All in the Family. Otherwise, she acted in mostly single-episode appearances on television between 1965 and 2002, including The Alfred Hitchcock Hour, The Brady Bunch, Soap, St. Elsewhere, Newhart, Murder She Wrote, Frasier, The Munsters Today, The John Larroquette Show, and the Gene Roddenberry pilot, Planet Earth.

=== Radio ===
In 1989, de Winter played Marie Antoinette in a six-hour radio drama, Bastille, produced by the University of Chicago on WFMT in Chicago, Illinois. She also played Elizabeth Schuyler Hamilton in a production of Hamilton & Burr, with the California Artists Radio Theatre.

== Personal life and death ==
Juanita Daussat married Robert Eggers Adamina in December 1941, the morning before the attack on Pearl Harbor. Her husband was an officer in the United States Air Force. He was a prisoner of war in Germany during World War II; he later served as chief of protocol in Washington, D.C., and as a member of the NATO planning staff. They had one son, Robert Jr., and one daughter, Robyn. As a military wife, she was involved in embassy and officers' wives activities, and gave presentations to women's groups. They lived in Pennsylvania, Washington, D.C., San Francisco, and in Italy, before they moved to Port Hueneme in 1965, after Col. Adamina retired from the Air Force. Their son and his wife were killed in an automobile accident in 1974.

De Winter died in January 2016, at the age of 94.

== Filmography ==
Year	Title	Role	Notes
1971	Dirty Harry	Miss Willis	
1972	Pete 'n' Tillie	Party Guest	Uncredited
1984	Breakin' 2: Electric Boogaloo	Mrs. Bennett	
1988	Bird	Mildred Berg	
1994	There Goes My Baby	Miss Shine	
2016	Monday Nights at Seven	Nana	Final film role
