= Hugh O'Connor =

Italian-American actor (1962–1995)

- Born: Hugh Edward Ralph O'Connor; April 7, 1962; Rome, Italy
- Died: March 28, 1995 (aged 32); Pacific Palisades, California, U.S.
- Occupation: Actor
- Spouse: Angela Clayton (m. 1992)
- Children: 1
- Parent: Carroll O'Connor

Hugh Edward Ralph O'Connor (April 7, 1962 – March 28, 1995) was an American actor known for his role as James Flynn in the 1984 film Brass and his portrayal of Lonnie Jamison on In the Heat of the Night until his death in 1995. He was the son of American actor Carroll O'Connor.

== Biography ==
=== Personal life ===
O'Connor was born in Rome, Italy. When he was six days old, he was adopted by Carroll O'Connor and his wife, Nancy (née Fields). Carroll was in Rome filming Cleopatra. He was named after Carroll's younger brother, who had died in a motorcycle crash in 1961.

When he was 16, O'Connor was diagnosed with Hodgkin's lymphoma. He survived the cancer with chemotherapy and two surgeries but ultimately became addicted to drugs. He had been taking prescription drugs for the pain but later became dependent on harder drugs. Despite numerous stays at rehabilitation clinics, he never conquered his addiction and remained in recovery.

O'Connor married Angela Clayton, a wardrobe assistant on In the Heat of the Night, on March 28, 1992. They had one son, Sean Carroll O'Connor.

== Death ==
On March 28, 1995, O'Connor called his father to say that he was going to end his life. He said he believed he could not beat his drug addiction and could not face another drug rehabilitation program. Carroll called the police, who arrived at O'Connor's Pacific Palisades, California, home just as he shot himself.

=== Legal issues ===
Six months before O'Connor's death, Angela told Carroll that a man named Harry Thomas Perzigian had been furnishing O'Connor with drugs. Carroll had retained a private detective to investigate. About a week before O'Connor's death, Carroll called Perzigian to warn him to stop providing cocaine to his son, and brought the evidence to the Los Angeles Police Department, asking them to arrest Perzigian.

Several hours after O'Connor's death, Carroll publicly named Perzigian as the man who caused his death. Perzigian was arrested the next day for drug possession and furnishing cocaine after a search of his apartment turned up cocaine and drug paraphernalia. In January 1996, he was sentenced to a year in jail, a $1,000 fine, 200 hours of community service, and three years of probation following a bench trial.

Perzigian later sued Carroll for $10 million for slander after Carroll called Perzigian a "sleazeball" and said "he was a partner in murder, not an accessory, a partner in murder" in an interview with Diane Sawyer on ABC's Primetime Live. After a highly publicized civil trial, Carroll was found not liable. He dedicated much of the rest of his life to speaking out on drug awareness.

== Drug Dealer Liability Act ==
After O'Connor's death, Carroll successfully lobbied to get the state of California to pass legislation that allows family members of an addicted person or anyone injured by a drug dealer's actions, including employers, to sue for reimbursement for medical treatment and rehabilitation costs. The law, known as the Drug Dealer Liability Act, went into effect in 1997. It is an updated version of the Model Drug Dealer Liability Act authored in 1992 by then Hawaii U.S. Attorney Daniel Bent. It had been passed in several states before it was passed in California with Carroll's support, and it is now the law in sixteen states and the U.S. Virgin Islands. Successful cases have been brought under the Model Drug Dealer Liability Act in Michigan, Utah, and Illinois.

== Filmography ==
- 1984: Brass – as James Flynn
- 1988–1994: In the Heat of the Night – as Officer, Sergeant, and Det./Lt. Lonnie Jameson
