= Archie Bunker's Place =

American television sitcom (1979–1983)

- Genre: Sitcom
- Based on: Till Death Us Do Part created by Johnny Speight
- Starring: Carroll O'Connor; Jean Stapleton; Martin Balsam; Danielle Brisebois; Allan Melvin; Denise Miller; Jason Wingreen; Barbara Meek; Bill Quinn; Anne Meara; Abraham Alvarez; Joe Rosario; Barry Gordon
- Opening theme: "Those Were the Days" by Lee Adams and Charles Strouse (Ray Conniff instrumental version)
- Ending theme: "Remembering You" by Roger Kellaway and Carroll O'Connor (Ray Conniff instrumental version)
- Country of origin: United States
- No. of seasons: 4
- No. of episodes: 97 (list of episodes)

Production
- Running time: 22 minutes
- Production companies: Tandem Productions; The O'Connor-Becker Company; UGO Productions Inc.

Original release
- Network: CBS
- Release: September 23, 1979 – April 4, 1983

Related
- Maude; The Jeffersons; Good Times; Checking In

Archie Bunker's Place is an American television sitcom produced as a continuation of All in the Family. It aired on CBS from September 23, 1979 to April 4, 1983. After the final first-run telecast on CBS in April 1983, the series went into reruns on Wednesdays from June 29 through September 21, 1983. While not as popular as its predecessor, the show maintained a large enough audience to last four seasons. It performed so well during its first season that it displaced Mork & Mindy from its Sunday night time slot; a year earlier, during its first season, Mork & Mindy had been the No. 3 show on television.

== Background ==
Although the Bunker home, long familiar to viewers, continues to be featured, the scenes are primarily set in the title's neighborhood tavern in Astoria, Queens, which Archie Bunker (Carroll O'Connor) purchased in the eighth-season premiere of All in the Family. During the first season as Archie Bunker's Place, Bunker takes on a Jewish partner, Murray Klein (Martin Balsam), when co-owner Harry Snowden decides to sell his share of the business. Early in the first season, to increase business, Archie and Murray build a restaurant onto the bar: the additions include a separate seating area for the restaurant and a well-equipped kitchen with a service window. Regular patrons include Barney Hefner, Hank Pivnik, and Edgar Van Ranseleer.

Archie Bunker's Place is the sounding board for Archie's views, support from his friends, and Murray's counterpoints. Later in the series, after Murray remarries and leaves for San Francisco, Archie has one of his attorneys, Gary Rabinowitz (Barry Gordon), take on the role of business manager. Gary's views are liberal, in contrast to Archie's conservatism.

== Jean Stapleton ==
In December 1978, Jean Stapleton announced that she did not want to renew her contract at the end of the ongoing ninth season. She felt her character, Edith Bunker, had run its course on the show. At that time, Norman Lear, the creator of All in the Family, wanted the series to end while it was still on top in ratings and critical reception. But Robert Daly, then vice president of CBS Television, persuaded Carroll O’Connor to continue with All in the Family for at least another year. Daly felt that since the show was still garnering high ratings, it was still valuable to the network and could run at least another year. Since Lear was insistent on ending the program, Daly asked O’Connor to get Lear to reconsider. After meeting with O’Connor, Lear agreed to let the show's characters continue but refused to allow the series to be called All in the Family any longer.

As a result, Archie Bunker’s Place was created and the show's plots centered less on Archie's home life and more on his bar and his colleagues and patrons who frequented it. To help with this transition, Stapleton agreed to play Edith on the newly titled series in five appearances during the 1979–80 season. At the start of the next (1980–81) season, Edith died (off screen) and was written out of the series.

== Characters ==
- Carroll O'Connor as Archie Bunker, a blue-collar worker whose ignorant stubbornness tends to cause his arguments to self-destruct. By the time of Archie Bunker's Place, however, the character has mellowed somewhat and is no longer as explicitly bigoted as he had been during the first seasons of All in the Family, even agreeing to go into business with Murray, who is Jewish, and becoming close friends with him.
- Jean Stapleton continued to play Archie's wife Edith Bunker when Archie Bunker's Place premiered. The show featured Edith five times during the first 14 episodes of the first season, but Stapleton decided to leave the series late in 1979; her character was referred to but unseen during most of the 1979–80 season. The writers and producers addressed Stapleton's departure in the Season 2 premiere, explaining that Edith had died of a stroke. Archie reflected on his wife's death and eventually began dating again.
- Martin Balsam as Murray Klein (1979–81). Murray was Archie's Jewish partner, who held liberal views similar to those of Archie's son-in-law Michael Stivic. Unlike Mike, Murray was much more tolerant and patient with Archie's views. (Season 1-2, 4 guest)
- Danielle Brisebois as Stephanie Mills, the Jewish daughter of Edith's step-cousin, Floyd Mills. Archie and Edith take Stephanie in after her father, a chronic, unemployed drunk, abandoned her during the final season of All in the Family. Stephanie, 10 years old at the start of the series, loved to sing and dance, and her talents were showcased in several episodes.
- Celeste Holm as Estelle Harris (1981–83), Stephanie's wealthy maternal grandmother, who would often be at odds with Archie over his rearing of Stephanie.
- Allan Melvin as Barney Hefner, Archie's best friend and a regular at the bar. Their friendship was first established in 1972 during an episode of All in the Family. Barney was married to a friend of Edith's named Blanche (played by Estelle Parsons) (although in earlier seasons she was called Mabel). Blanche left Barney numerous times before the couple divorced in 1979, and Barney was ordered to pay alimony.
- Danny Dayton as Hank Pivnik, another regular. He first appeared in 1976 on All in the Family. Hank disappeared without explanation after the 1979–80 season.
- Bill Quinn as Edgar Van Ranseleer (a.k.a. "Mr. Van R"), a former schoolteacher and regular at the bar. He was blind, and usually even-tempered. He was very rarely referred to by his first name—almost everyone called him Mr. Van Ranseleer or Mr. Van R. His first appearance was in 1978 on All in the Family.
- Jason Wingreen as Harry Snowden, Archie's former business partner, who continued to work at the tavern as a bartender. Another holdover character from All in the Family, which Wingreen joined in 1976.
- Abraham Alvarez and Joe Rosario as Jose Perez and Raoul Rosario, two Latin-American immigrants employed as assistant cooks at Archie's bar. Archie later learns they are illegal immigrants after they refuse to give a statement to police after having witnessed a mugging.
- Anne Meara as Veronica Rooney (1979–82), the cook at Archie Bunker's Place. She often made wisecracks and gave Archie a hard time. She insisted that Archie also hire her openly gay nephew Fred as a waiter to help him pay for law school. She was an alcoholic and privately pined to reconcile with her ex-husband, Carmine (who appeared in a few episodes and was played by Meara's real-life husband Jerry Stiller), but knew it wasn't going to happen. Meara appeared sporadically throughout the show's third season and left the show before the fourth and final season.
- Dean Scofield (1979–80) as Fred Rooney, a gay waiter, and Veronica's nephew. Quits because of Archie's attitude toward his personal life.
- Barbara Meek as Ellen Canby (1980–82). Ellen was a black housekeeper who was hired by Archie after Edith's death. She also took care of Stephanie, and helped keep Archie's tongue in check. Though Archie still harbored some prejudice toward black people by the time she arrived on the scene, he deeply respected Ellen and was grateful for the job she did in helping to raise Stephanie. (season 2-3)
- Denise Miller, who joined the cast in Season 3 as Archie's 18-year-old niece, Barbara Lee "Billie" Bunker. Billie—who worked as a waitress at Archie Bunker's Place—was the daughter of Archie's estranged brother Fred. Her principal love interest was Gary Rabinowitz (see below).
- Barry Gordon (another 1981 addition to the cast) as Jewish lawyer and business manager Gary Rabinowitz. Gary quickly began dating Billie, who was 15 years younger than he. Just like Mike Stivic and Murray Klein before him, Gary's liberal beliefs often contrasted with those of staunchly conservative Archie. (season 3-4)
- Sally Struthers returned as Archie's daughter Gloria Stivic for several episodes. In addition to the 1979 episode "Thanksgiving Reunion," Struthers returned in the 1982 two-part episode "Gloria Comes Home," where she returns from California with her son, Joey after divorcing her husband, Mike (who had run off to a commune in Humboldt County, California, with a college student). The character eventually moved on to her own spin-off series, Gloria. (Note: The original unaired pilot episode to the TV series, which begins with a short appearance by Carroll O'Connor as Archie Bunker, was later repackaged as an Archie Bunker's Place episode.)

== Production ==
Unlike All in the Family, which took place largely in the Bunker family home, Archie Bunker's Place was set primarily in the local tavern Archie owned, and was videotaped on a closed set with multiple cameras, the best takes being edited together using a laugh track instead of a live studio audience. The finished product was then shown to live audiences attending tapings of One Day at a Time, thus providing a laugh track from real laughter for the show.

Production of all seasons of Archie Bunker's Place took place at Studios 31 & Bob Barker Studio at Television City Studios in Hollywood, the original production home of All in the Family for that show's first six seasons.

The theme song for Archie Bunker's Place was a re-scored instrumental version by Ray Conniff of "Those Were the Days," the long-familiar opening theme to All in the Family. The closing theme, "Remembering You," was a re-scored version of All in the Family's closing theme. Both versions featured a Dixieland-styled arrangement. The opening credits featured a view of the Queensboro Bridge, which connects Manhattan to Queens, followed by shots taken along Steinway Street in Astoria.

The show was canceled in 1983. Carroll O'Connor was frustrated over the cancellation when the show did not have an appropriate closure. He vowed never to work in any type of show with CBS again. He would later work for CBS again when he starred in In the Heat of the Night; when NBC decided not to renew the series it moved to CBS, which allowed the series to continue for two more years and have a proper ending.

The series was briefly rerun on TV Land in 2002 and 2003, including the unaired Gloria pilot. The last episode did air in a marathon along with the final episodes of All in the Family, The Jeffersons and Gloria. The series is currently shown on Antenna TV as of August 2018, replacing its parent series while it moved to GetTV in January 2018, until it later aired on MeTV in February 2022, and later MeTV's sister station Catchy Comedy as of March 2023.

Whereas All in the Family had been inspired by a British series, Till Death Us Do Part, the British series would later get a sequel; first, the short-lived Till Death..., and then In Sickness and in Health. Dandy Nichols, who had played Else Garnett (the British inspiration for Edith Bunker), coincidentally died after the first season of In Sickness and in Health, and the second-season premiere (strongly paralleling "Archie Alone") deals with her widower Alf Garnett dealing with grief in much the same way as Archie did with Edith's death.

== Episodes ==
| Season | Episodes | Originally released | | Rank | Rating |
| Season | Episodes | First released | Last released | Rank | Rating |
|---|---|---|---|---|---|
| 1 | 24 | September 23, 1979 | March 23, 1980 | 11 | 22.9 |
| 2 | 20 | November 2, 1980 | May 10, 1981 | 13 | 21.4 |
| 3 | 29 | October 4, 1981 | June 1, 1982 (Note: Season 3 officially concluded on May 16, 1982, after which the intended pilot episode for Gloria was broadcast.) | 12 | 21.6 |
| 4 | 24 | September 26, 1982 | April 4, 1983 | 22 | 18.3 (Note: Tied with That's Incredible!.) |

== Notable episodes ==
The series' most notable episode among critics was "Archie Alone," which originally aired November 2, 1980, as a one-hour special to open the second season of the series. In that episode, viewers learn that Edith had died of a stroke a month earlier (Jean Stapleton had resigned from her role), and Archie is unable to grieve. His refusal to let go of his emotions takes its toll on Stephanie, until one day Archie finds a single slipper of Edith's (overlooked when her clothes were collected for charity) in the bedroom. Holding the shoe, Archie laments aloud that Edith slipped away before he could tell her he loved her, and finally breaks down and cries. Later, after a talk with Stephanie, he agrees to take her to visit Edith's grave, fulfilling the request Stephanie had made to Archie at the beginning of the episode. The British TV series In Sickness and in Health, the continuation of Till Death Us Do Part on which All in the Family was based, had a similar episode in which Edith's British counterpart, Else Garnett, had died from natural causes. This was not a case of one series copying another; both series were forced to write these deaths due to unexpected departures by the actresses (Stapleton's resignation and Dandy Nichols' death).

"Thanksgiving Reunion"

The first-season episode "Thanksgiving Reunion" marked the final time the original ensemble from All in the Family—O'Connor, Stapleton, Sally Struthers and Rob Reiner—appeared together. In that episode, Mike announces that he has lost his job as a college professor after his participation in a nude protest of a proposed nuclear power plant became public. This puts a further strain on his already troubled marriage to Gloria (who at the episode's end lets it slip to Archie that Mike participated only because Gloria did not want to march alone), and foreshadows the Stivics' divorce.

Another notable episode was "The Return of Sammy," when Sammy Davis Jr. comes to the bar and restaurant after Archie calls his talk show. He, like Murray, is surprised that Archie has a Jewish niece. Later, when Sammy chokes on some food, Archie uses the Heimlich maneuver to save Sammy's life. At the end of the episode, Archie and Stephanie simultaneously kiss Sammy, contrasting what happened in the parent show's episode "Sammy's Visit."

In a special 1982 episode, which aired immediately after the Super Bowl, baseball superstar Reggie Jackson almost sues Archie, but decides not to when Jackson realizes the bad press would hurt his career.

Later, comedian Don Rickles guest-starred as a crusty boarder named Al Snyder, who rented a room from Archie's friend and neighbor Barney, whose wife Blanche had left him sometime earlier. Highlights of this episode are exchanges combining Rickles' insult humor and his character's curmudgeonly disposition with Archie's sincere but misguided efforts to resolve disputes between Snyder and Barney. Eventually, the Rickles character is exhausted by the constant chatter, takes his medication (again), and decides to rest. The Rickles character drifts off to sleep and dies. The episode ends with Barney pondering whether he will wind up like Mr. Snyder: "Sore at the world, 'cause I'm all alone."

=== Archie's last appearance ===
The last scene in which Archie Bunker ever appears comes in the episode, I'm Torn Here (season 4, episode 24; airdate April 4, 1983). He is at the bar with bartender Harry Snowden and regular patron Mr. Van Ranseleer, recounting a dream he had:

Archie: "So, at the end of the dream, the president [Reagan] ushers me right into the Oval Office."

Mr. Van R: "What happened?"

Archie: "Well, sitting around on the floor is the 20 mules from the Death Valley Days."

Mr. Van R: "Sounds like his Cabinet."

Archie: "Jeez, I guess that's who they was because one of 'em takes off his nosebag -- and it's [then-vice president] George Bush! And he says the way to tame El Salvador is to make the damn place into the 49th state."

Mr. Van R: "Was there any music in this dream?"

Archie: "No, but there was a toilet flush. That's what woke me up."

== Home media and streaming ==
Sony Pictures Home Entertainment released The Complete First Season of Archie Bunker's Place on DVD in North America on January 31, 2006. On August 27, 2013, it was announced that Mill Creek Entertainment had acquired the home media rights to various television series from the Sony Pictures library including Archie Bunker's Place. On July 7, 2015, Mill Creek re-released the first season on DVD. In 2022, the complete series was made available for streaming in Canada on CTV.

As of 2026, reruns of Archie Bunker's Place have aired on Antenna TV Saturdays at 5:00 & 5:30 p.m. EST and sister network Rewind TV weekdays at 6:00 & 6:30 a.m. EST.

== Cultural references ==
"Eulogy and Tavern," the 12th chapter (Chapter 4, Part 3) of Jonathan Lethem's novel Dissident Gardens, is set within the world of the television show. One of the book's main characters, Rose, begins frequenting a bar called Kelcy's on Northern Boulevard near her home in Sunnyside Gardens, Queens, where she befriends the owner, Archie Bunker, and eventually tries to seduce him with her old Communist rhetoric. ("Your lifelong dream, Archie, only you don't know it. Hump a hot Red.") The chapter includes appearances by series-regulars Barney Hefner, Hank Pivnik, Edgar Van Ranseleer, Harry Snowden and Stephanie Mills.
