= Jean Stapleton =

American actress (1923–2013)

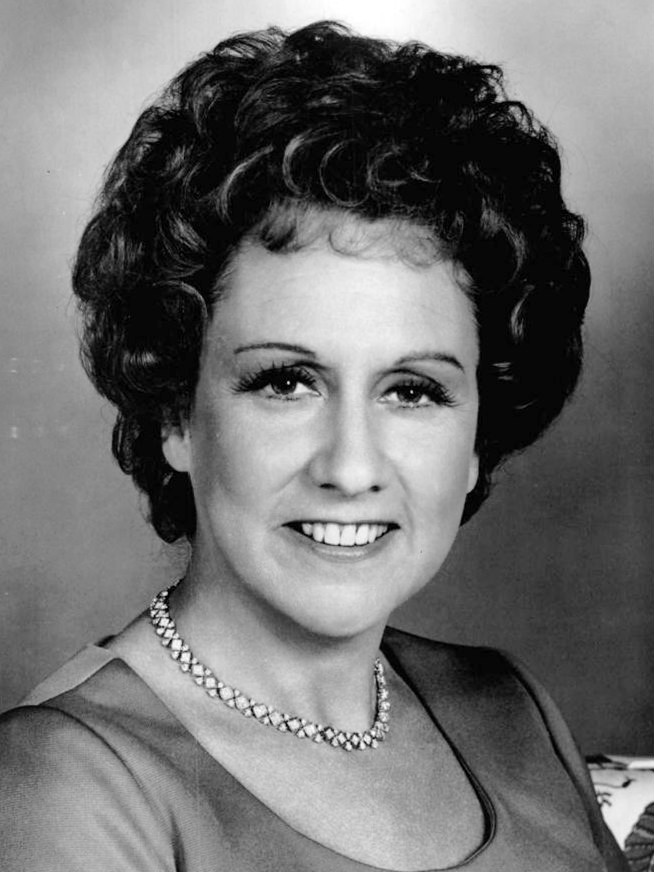
- Stapleton in 1977
- Born: Jeanne Murray; January 19, 1923; New York City, U.S.
- Died: May 31, 2013 (aged 90); New York City, U.S.
- Resting place: Cremation
- Occupation: Actress
- Years active: 1941–2001
- Spouse: William H. Putch (m. 1957; died 1983)
- Children: 2, including John Putch

Jean Stapleton (born Jeanne Murray; January 19, 1923 – May 31, 2013) was an American character actress of stage, television, and film. She was best known for her portrayal of Edith Bunker, the perpetually optimistic and devoted wife of Archie Bunker, on the 1970s sitcom All in the Family. The role earned her three Emmys and two Golden Globes for Best Actress in a comedy series.

== Early life ==
Stapleton was born on January 19, 1923 in Manhattan, New York. She was the daughter of Marie A. Stapleton, an opera singer, and Joseph E. Murray, a billboard advertising salesman. She had an elder brother, Jack. Her uncle was a vaudevillian performer, and her brother was a stage actor who inspired her to pursue acting.

== Career ==
Jean Stapleton began her career in 1942 aged 18 in summer stock theater and made her New York debut in the Off-Broadway play American Gothic. She was featured on Broadway in several hit musicals, including Funny Girl, Juno, Damn Yankees, and Bells Are Ringing, recreating her parts from the latter two musicals in the film versions of Damn Yankees (1958) (her film debut) and Bells Are Ringing (1960).

Stapleton's early television roles included parts in Starlight Theatre, Robert Montgomery Presents, Lux Video Theater, Woman with a Past, The Philco-Goodyear Television Playhouse, The Patty Duke Show, Dr. Kildare, My Three Sons, Dennis the Menace, Naked City, and as Rosa Criley in a 1963 episode of NBC's medical drama about psychiatry, The Eleventh Hour, entitled "The Bride Wore Pink". In 1962, Stapleton guest-starred as Mrs. Larsen in "The Hidden Jungle", an episode of the TV series The Defenders (broadcast on December 1, 1962), alongside her future All in the Family co-star Carroll O'Connor.

Stapleton also appeared in the feature films Something Wild (1961), Up the Down Staircase (1967), Klute (1971) and the Norman Lear comedy Cold Turkey (also 1971). She bested both Mary Tyler Moore and Marlo Thomas for the "Best Actress in a Comedy" Primetime Emmy award on May 9, 1971. She was offered the role of Mrs. Teevee in the feature film Willy Wonka & the Chocolate Factory (1971), but declined because it coincided with the production of the All in the Family pilot (the role ultimately went to Nora Denney).

=== All in the Family ===
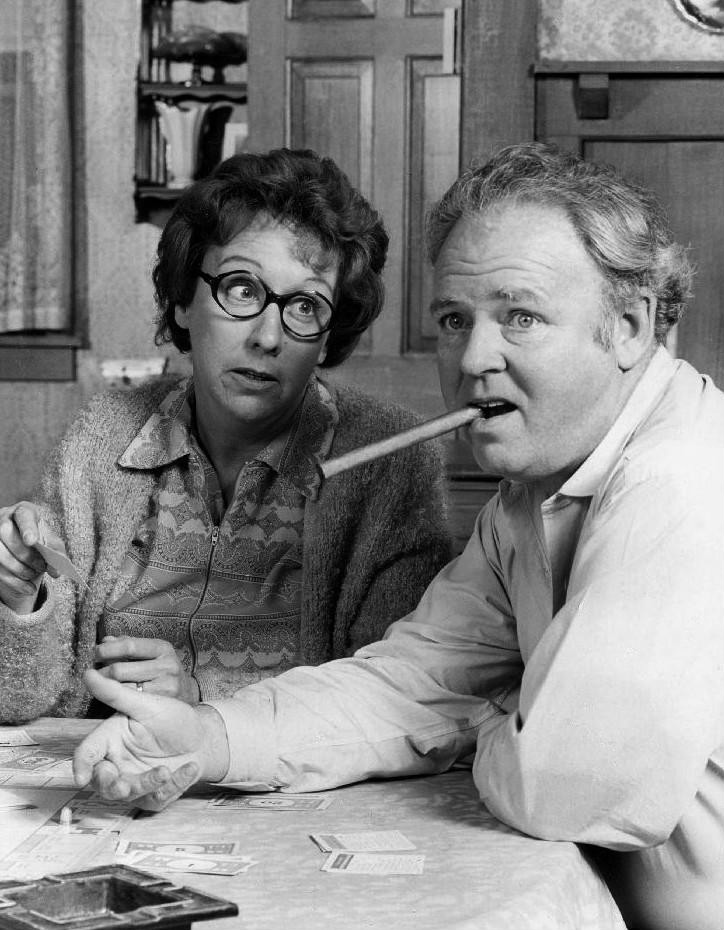
Stapleton (left) beside Carroll O'Connor on the set of All in the Family

Stapleton played the role of Edith in All in the Family, which premiered in 1971. The show was originally broadcast on the CBS network for nine seasons from January 12, 1971, to April 8, 1979, for a total of 205 episodes. The role earned her three Emmys and two Golden Globes.

Feeling her character had run its course, Stapleton continued the role of Edith for only five more episodes in the follow-up series Archie Bunker's Place to help the transition. In the first episode of season two, the character of Edith had an offscreen stroke and was written out of the show.

=== Other works ===
Stapleton appeared in the Emmy Award–winning TV movie Tail Gunner Joe (1977), dramatizing the life of U.S. Senator Joseph R. McCarthy, and later guest-starred in the sixth episode of the third season of The Muppet Show (broadcast on September 30, 1978).

In 1979, she featured in the original Canadian production of the musical Something's Afoot, which was later broadcast on Showtime. She played the title role in the Hallmark Hall of Fame TV movie, Aunt Mary (also 1979), which detailed the true story of Baltimore children's advocate Mary Dobkin. In 1982, Stapleton portrayed Eleanor Roosevelt in the TV movie Eleanor, First Lady of the World, focusing on the subject's later life. The role earned her Emmy and Golden Globe nominations for Best Actress.

She continued to guest-star in a number of television series during the 1980s including two episodes of Faerie Tale Theatre—in 1983 and 1985 editions entitled "Jack and the Beanstalk" as the Giant's Wife and "Cinderella" as the Fairy Godmother—Scarecrow and Mrs. King and The Love Boat. Stapleton also co-starred in the film The Buddy System (1984), alongside Susan Sarandon and Richard Dreyfuss, and played Ariadne Oliver in the 1986 television adaptation of Dead Man's Folly, opposite Peter Ustinov as Hercule Poirot. She declined the role of Jessica Fletcher in the TV series Murder, She Wrote, which went to Angela Lansbury.

From 1990 to 1991, Stapleton co-starred with Whoopi Goldberg in 15 episodes of Bagdad Cafe, the television series based on the movie of the same name. In 1994, Stapleton played the role of Mrs. Piggle-Wiggle in a children's series of the same name based on the books by Betty MacDonald.In 1996, Stapleton appeared in the educational series Beakman's World as Beakman's mother, Beakmom, and also appeared on Everybody Loves Raymond playing Ray's imperious aunt. Also in 1996, she appeared in a Murphy Brown episode, "All in the Family", playing Miles's grandmother, Nana Silverberg, and played opposite John Travolta in Nora Ephron's hit film Michael as the eccentric rooming house owner, Pansy Milbank. Stapleton was the voice of Grandma Ollie in KinderActive's video game Grandma Ollie's Morphabet Soup. The game won a Teacher's Choice Award from Learning Magazine.

On January 26, 1998, Stapleton guest-starred on the Jean Smart sitcom Style & Substance in the episode "A Recipe for Disaster", playing a former television chef who has an alcohol problem. She voiced John Rolfe's maid, Mrs. Jenkins, in Disney's 1998 direct-to-video animated film Pocahontas II: Journey to a New World, and appeared in the film You've Got Mail as a close co-worker in whom Meg Ryan's character confides. From 1998, Stapleton took her "Eleanor" characterization to live theaters, now adapted as a one-woman show.

In May 2000, Stapleton appeared in "Mother's Day", an episode of the TV series Touched by an Angel, portraying an angel named Emma who came to help Celine who was taking care of her late best friend's mother. Stapleton's final film role was as Irene Silverman in the 2001 fact-based TV movie, Like Mother, Like Son: The Strange Story of Sante and Kenny Kimes, starring Mary Tyler Moore as convicted criminal Sante Kimes. while her final acting role was in Horton Foote's The Carpetbagger's Children at Lincoln Center in New York, March 7, 2002. Stapleton was inducted into the American Theatre Hall of Fame in 2002. She was also inducted into the Television Hall of Fame that same year.

== Personal life ==
Stapleton and William Putch were married from 1957 until his death in 1983. They had two children: actor/writer/director John Putch and television producer Pamela Putch. For 30 years, William Putch directed a summer stock theater, Totem Pole Playhouse, at Caledonia State Park in Fayetteville, Pennsylvania. Stapleton performed regularly at the theater with the resident company. When William Putch died of a heart attack during the run of a touring production in Syracuse, Stapleton insisted on performing that night.

Stapleton's brother, Jack Stapleton, was a stage actor. Her cousin was actress Betty Jane Watson. Jean was active in the Christian Science church. She was unrelated to actress Maureen Stapleton, contrary to a common misconception. Jean supported Walter Mondale's campaign in the 1984 presidential election, was a vocal supporter of the Equal Rights Amendment, and took an active role in the 1977 National Women's Conference.

Jean Stapleton rarely appeared on talk shows; nevertheless, she reunited on-camera with Carroll O'Connor on Donny and Marie Osmond's show on April 24, 2000, a little over a year before O'Connor's death. When the Osmonds asked her to perform in Edith Bunker's voice, she declined to do so and jokingly said that she only did so "for pay".

== Death and reaction ==
Stapleton died at her apartment in Manhattan, on May 31, 2013, at age 90. Norman Lear said, "No one gave more profound 'how to be a human being' lessons than Jean Stapleton." Co-star Rob Reiner said, "Working with her was one of the greatest experiences of my life." Sally Struthers said, "Jean lived so in the present. She was a Christian Scientist who didn't say or think a negative thing... She was just a walking, living angel".

The marquee lights on Broadway were dimmed for two minutes on June 5, 2013, at 8 p.m. EDT, to honor the memory of Stapleton. She was cremated by the Neptune Society in Paramus, New Jersey. Her cenotaph lies at Lincoln Cemetery in Chambersburg, Pennsylvania.

== Filmography ==
=== Films ===
Year	Title	Role	Notes
1958	Damn Yankees	Sister Miller	Film debut; recreating Broadway role
1960	Bells Are Ringing	Sue	
1961	Something Wild	Shirley Johnson	
1967	Up the Down Staircase	Sadie Finch	
1971	Cold Turkey	Mrs. Wappler	
1971	Klute	Goldfarb's Secretary	
1984	The Buddy System	Mrs. Price	
1993	The Trial	Landlady	Uncredited
1996	Michael	Pansy Milbank	
1998	Pocahontas II: Journey to a New World	Mrs. Jenkins (voice)	Direct-to-video
1998	You've Got Mail	Birdie Conrad	
2001	Pursuit of Happiness	Lorraine	Final film role

=== Television ===
Year	Title	Role	Notes
1951	Starlight Theatre	Woman	Episode: "The Come-Back"
1952	Robert Montgomery Presents		Episode: "Storm"
1953	Lux Video Theatre	Teacher	Episode: "A Time for Heroes"
1954–1956	Omnibus		2 episodes
1954	Woman with a Past	Gwen	TV series
1955	Repertory Theatre	Bus Girl	Episode: "A Business Proposition"
1960	The Robert Herridge Theater		Episode: "The End of the Beginning"
1961–1963	Naked City	Various	3 episodes
1961	Dr. Kildare	Nurse Whitney	Episode: "The Patient"
1962	Dennis the Menace	Mrs. Flora Davis	Episode: "Mr. Wilson's Housekeeper"
1962	The Nurses	Mrs. Montgomery	Episode: "The Barbara Bowers Story"
1962	Jackie Gleason: American Scene Magazine	Nagging Wife	Episode: #1.5
1962	The Defenders	Mrs. Larsen	Episode: "The Hidden Jungle"
1962	Car 54, Where Are You?	Mrs. Duggan (uncredited)	Episode: "Je T'Adore Muldoon"
1963	The Eleventh Hour	Rosa Criley	Episode: "The Bride Wore Pink"
1963	Route 66	Mrs. Snyder	Episode: "93 Percent in Smiling"
1964	My Three Sons	Molly Dunbar	Episode: "The People's House"
1965	The Patty Duke Show	Mrs. Pollack	Episode: "The Raffle"
1971–1979	All in the Family	Edith Bunker	205 episodes Primetime Emmy Award for Outstanding Lead Actress in a Comedy Series (1971–1972, 1978); Golden Globe Award for Best Actress – Television Series Musical or Comedy (1973–1974); Nominated — Primetime Emmy Award for Outstanding Lead Actress in a Comedy Series (1973–1975, 1977, 1979); Nominated — Golden Globe Award for Best Actress – Television Series Musical or Comedy (1972, 1975, 1978–1980)
1973	Acts of Love and Other Comedies	Gina's Mother	TV movie
1976	American Documents, Vol. 5: How We Got the Vote	Host/Narrator	TV documentary
1977	Tail Gunner Joe	Mrs. DeCamp	TV movie
1978	The Muppet Show	Herself	1 episode
1979	You Can't Take It with You	Penny Sycamore	TV movie
1979	Aunt Mary	Mary Dobkin	TV movie
1979	Archie Bunker's Place	Edith Bunker	5 episodes
1981	Angel Dusted	Betty Eaton	TV movie
1981	Captain Kangaroo	Freddie's Mom	Episode: "The Captain Kangaroo's 25th Anniversary Special"
1981	Isabel's Choice	Isabel Cooper	TV movie
1982	Eleanor, First Lady of the World	Eleanor Roosevelt	TV movie Nominated — Primetime Emmy Award for Outstanding Lead Actress in a Limited Series or Movie; Nominated — Golden Globe Award for Best Actress – Miniseries or Television Film
1982	Something's Afoot	Miss Tweed	TV movie
1983–1985	Faerie Tale Theatre	Various	2 episodes
1984	A Matter of Sex	Irene	TV movie
1984	Scarecrow and Mrs. King	Lady Emily Farnsworth	2 episodes
1985	Great Performances	Helen	Episode: "Grown-Ups"
1986	Dead Man's Folly	Ariadne Oliver	TV movie
1986	The Love Boat	Helen Branigan	2 episodes
1987	Tender Places	Sam	TV Short (7 minutes)
1989	Trying Times	Edna	Episode: "The Boss"
1990	The American Playwrights Theater: The One Acts	Helen	Episode: "Let Me Hear You Whisper"
1990	Mother Goose Rock 'n' Rhyme	Mother Goose	TV movie
1990–1991	Bagdad Cafe	Jasmine Zweibel	15 episodes
1991	Fire in the Dark	Henny	TV movie Nominated — Golden Globe Award for Best Supporting Actress – Series, Miniseries or Television Film
1992	Shelley Duvall's Bedtime Stories	Narrator (voice)	Episode: "Elizabeth and Larry/Bill and Pete"
1992	The Habitation of Dragons	Lenora Tolliver	TV movie
1992	The Ray Bradbury Theater	Grandma	Episode: "Fee Fie Foe Fum"
1993	General Motors Playwrights Theater	Emilie	Episode: "The Parallax Garden"
1993	Ghost Mom	Mildred	TV movie
1994	Mrs. Piggle-Wiggle	Mrs. Piggle-Wiggle	13 episodes
1994	Grace Under Fire	Aunt Vivian	Episode: "The Road to Paris, Texas"; Nominated — Primetime Emmy Award for Outstanding Guest Actress in a Comedy Series
1995	Caroline in the City	Aunt Mary Kosky	Episode: "Caroline and the Opera"
1996	Murphy Brown	Nana Silverberg	Episode: "All in the Family"
1996	Lily Dale	Mrs. Coons	TV movie
1996	Everybody Loves Raymond	Aunt Alda	Episode: "I Wish I Were Gus"
1996	Beakman's World	Beakman's Mom	Episode: "Elephants, Beakmania and X-Rays"
1996	1914–1918	Edith Wilson (voice)	TV miniseries documentary: "War Without End"
1998	Style & Substance	Gloria	Episode: "A Recipe for Disaster"
1998	Chance of a Lifetime	Mrs. Dunbar	TV movie
2000	Touched by an Angel	Emma	Episode: "Mother's Day"
2000	Baby	Byrd	TV movie
2001	Like Mother Like Son: The Strange Story of Sante and Kenny Kimes	Irene Silverman	TV movie Final film role

=== Stage ===
Year	Title	Role	Notes
1953	In the Summer House	Inez	Playhouse Theatre, Broadway
1953	American Gothic	Mrs. Adams	Circle in the Square, Off-Broadway
1955	Damn Yankees	Sister	46th Street Theatre, Broadway
1956	Bells are Ringing	Sue	Shubert Theatre, Broadway
1959	Juno	Mrs. Madigan	Winter Garden Theatre, Broadway
1961	Rhinoceros	Mrs. Ochs	Longacre Theatre, Broadway
1964	Funny Girl	Mrs. Strakosh	Winter Garden Theatre, Broadway
1986	Arsenic and Old Lace	Abby Brewster	46th Street Theatre, Broadway
1991	The Learned Ladies	Philamente	Classic Stage Company, Off-Broadway
2002	The Carpetbagger's Children	Grace Ann	Mitzi E. Newhouse Theatre, Off-Broadway
