= Carroll O'Connor =

American actor (1924–2001)

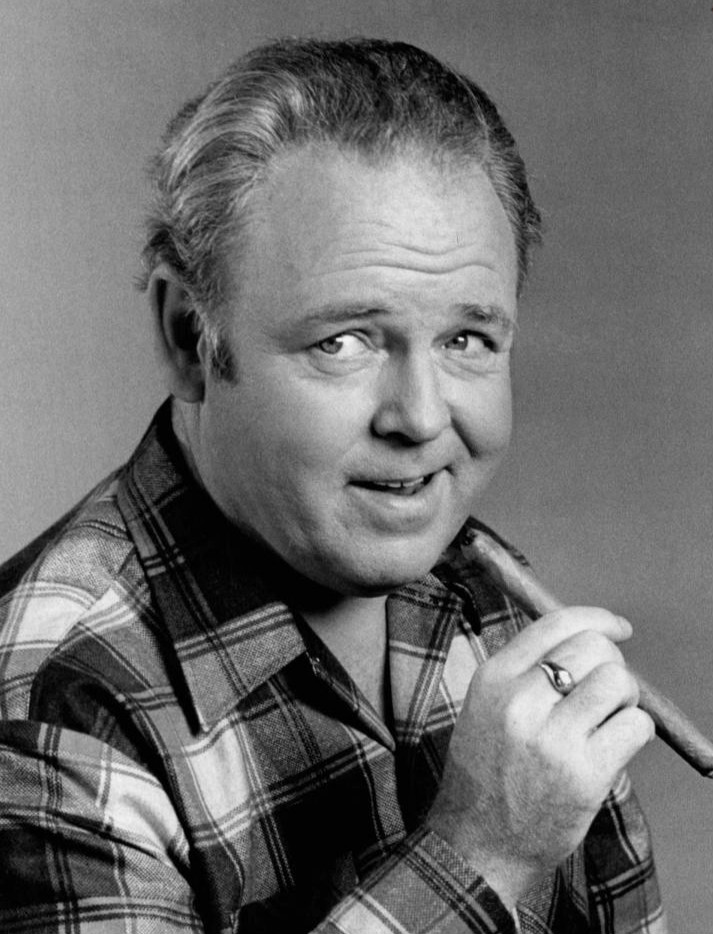
- O'Connor as Archie Bunker in 1975
- Born: John Carroll O'Connor; August 2, 1924; Manhattan, New York, U.S.
- Died: June 21, 2001 (aged 76); Culver City, California, U.S.
- Burial place: Westwood Village Memorial Park Cemetery; Los Angeles, California, U.S.
- Education: United States Merchant Marine Academy, University College Dublin (BA), University of Montana (MA)
- Occupation: Actor
- Years active: 1950–2001
- Spouse: Nancy Fields (m. 1951)
- Children: Hugh O'Connor

John Carroll O'Connor (August 2, 1924 – June 21, 2001) was an American actor whose television career spanned over four decades. He found widespread fame as Archie Bunker (for which he won four Emmy Awards), the main character in the CBS television sitcoms All in the Family (1971–1979) and its continuation, Archie Bunker's Place (1979–1983).

He later starred in the NBC/CBS television crime drama In the Heat of the Night (1988–1995), where he played the role of police chief William "Bill" Gillespie. In the late 1990s, he played Gus Stemple, the father of Jamie Buchman (Helen Hunt) on Mad About You. In 1996, O'Connor was ranked number 38 on TV Guide's 50 Greatest TV Stars of All Time. He won five Emmys and one Golden Globe Award.

== Early life ==
Carroll O'Connor, the eldest of three sons, was born on August 2, 1924, in Manhattan, New York, to Edward Joseph O'Connor, a lawyer, and his wife, Elise Patricia O'Connor (née O'Connor), a teacher. Both of his brothers became doctors: Hugh, who died in a motorcycle accident in 1961, and Robert, a psychiatrist in New York City. O'Connor spent much of his youth in Elmhurst and Forest Hills, Queens.

O'Connor graduated from Newtown High School in Elmhurst. In 1941, he enrolled at Wake Forest College in Wake Forest, North Carolina, but dropped out when the United States entered World War II. During the war, he was rejected by the United States Navy and enrolled in the United States Merchant Marine Academy for a short time. After leaving that institution, he became a merchant seaman and served in the United States Merchant Marine during the war.

After the war, O'Connor attended the University of Montana, where he worked at the Montana Kaimin student newspaper as an editor. In 1949, he resigned his editing position in protest to the pressure from the campus administration that led to the confiscation and destruction of an issue of the paper, which carried a cartoon depicting the Montana Board of Education as rats gnawing at a bag of university funds. At the University of Montana, he also joined the Sigma Phi Epsilon fraternity.

O'Connor did not take any drama courses as an undergraduate at the University of Montana, but he acted in student theater productions. He met Nancy Fields (born 1929), who later became his wife, when she was working as a makeup artist and lighting technician in a student-produced production of Our Town. He later left that university to help his younger brother Hugh get into medical school in Ireland, where Carroll completed his undergraduate studies at University College Dublin. There he studied Irish history and English literature, graduated in 1952, and began his acting career.

After O'Connor's fiancée, Nancy Fields, graduated from the University of Montana in 1951 with degrees in drama and English, she sailed to Ireland to study at Trinity College Dublin and met Carroll, who was visiting his brother, Hugh. The couple married in Dublin on July 28, 1951. In 1956, O'Connor returned to the University of Montana to earn a master's degree in speech.

== Career ==
=== Prolific character actor ===
After acting in theatrical productions in Dublin and New York during the 1950s, O'Connor's breakthrough came when he was cast by director Burgess Meredith, assisted by John Astin, in a featured role in the Broadway adaptation of James Joyce's novel Ulysses. O'Connor and Meredith remained close, lifelong friends. This performance led to him being offered a role in an Off Broadway production of Clifford Odets' play The Big Knife, where he played an dishonest Hollywood boss.

=== Early film roles ===
In the 1960s and early 1970s, O'Connor appeared in a number of studio films including Lonely Are the Brave (1962), Cleopatra (1963), In Harm's Way (1965), What Did You Do in the War, Daddy? (1966), Hawaii (1966), Not with My Wife, You Don't! (1966), Warning Shot (1967), Point Blank (1967), The Devil's Brigade (1968), For Love of Ivy (1968), Death of a Gunfighter (1969), Marlowe (1969), Kelly's Heroes (1970) and Doctors' Wives (1971). In many of his roles he portrayed a military or police officer, in several a particularly blustery one.

=== Television roles ===
In the 1960s, O'Connor appeared in episodes of notable television series such as The Americans, The Untouchables, Naked City, Death Valley Days, The Eleventh Hour, Bonanza, The Defenders, The Outer Limits, The Fugitive, The Great Adventure, The Man from U.N.C.L.E., Voyage to the Bottom of the Sea, Ben Casey, Dr. Kildare, I Spy, The Wild Wild West, The Time Tunnel, That Girl, Premiere, Insight and Gunsmoke, among many others. O'Connor also guest-starred as Josef Varsh in the first season of Mission Impossible.

O'Connor also performed in anthology television shows such as two episodes of NBC Sunday Showcase, The United States Steel Hour, Armstrong Circle Theatre, The Play of the Week, The Dick Powell Show, Alcoa Premiere, The DuPont Show of the Week, Profiles in Courage and Bob Hope Presents the Chrysler Theatre.

O'Connor was among the actors considered for the roles of the Skipper on Gilligan's Island, and Dr. Smith in the TV show Lost in Space.

==== All in the Family ====
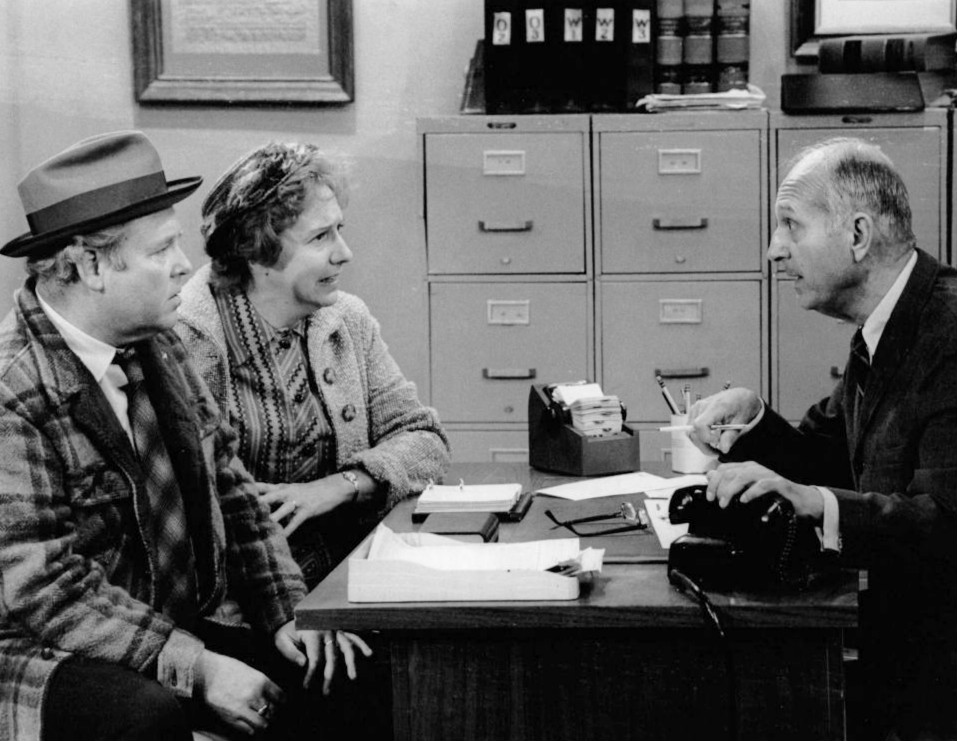
A publicity photo of O'Connor and Jean Stapleton in All in the Family, 1973

O'Connor was living in Italy in 1968 when producer Norman Lear asked him to come to New York City and star in a series that he was creating for ABC titled Justice for All. Lear recruited O'Connor to play the role of Archie Justice, a bigot who was able to bring forth some measure of empathy from the audience. After two television pilots of the sitcom were produced between 1968 and 1970, the hosting network was changed to CBS. For the third pilot, the last name of its main character was changed to Bunker, and its title was changed to All in the Family. The show was based on the BBC's Till Death Us Do Part, and Bunker was based on Alf Garnett, but he was somewhat less abrasive than the original British character. O'Connor's Queens background and his ability to speak with a working-class New York accent both influenced Lear to set the show in Queens.

Desiring a well known actor to play the lead, Lear approached Mickey Rooney, but he declined the role. O'Connor accepted the role because he did not expect the show to succeed, and he believed that he would move back to Europe when it failed. In her book Archie & Edith, Mike & Gloria: the Tumultuous History of All in the Family, Donna McCrohan revealed that O'Connor had requested that Lear provide him with a return airplane ticket to Rome as a condition of his acceptance of the role so that he could return to Italy when the show failed. Instead, All in the Family became the highest-rated show on American television for five consecutive seasons.

While O'Connor's personal politics were liberal, he understood the Bunker character and played him not only with bombast and humor but with touches of vulnerability. The show's writing was consistently left of center, but O'Connor, while his character held right-wing views, could also deftly skewer the liberal pieties of the day. Bunker was famous for his English language malapropisms, but O'Connor was in truth a highly educated and cultured man and taught English before he turned to acting. Archie Bunker's long-suffering wife Edith was played by Jean Stapleton, also from New York City, a Broadway actress whom Lear remembered from the play and film Damn Yankees. The show also starred then-unknown character actors Rob Reiner as Archie's liberal son-in-law Michael "Meathead" Stivic and Sally Struthers as Gloria, Archie and Edith's only child and Mike's wife.

CBS debated whether the controversial subject matter of All in the Family would mesh with a sitcom. Racial issues, ethnicities, religions, sexuality, class, education, women's equality, gun control, politics, inflation, the Vietnam War, energy crisis, Watergate and other timely topics of the 1970s were addressed. Like its British predecessor Till Death Us Do Part, the show lent dramatic social substance to the traditional sitcom format. Archie Bunker's popularity made O'Connor a top-billing star of the 1970s. O'Connor was apprehensive of being typecast for playing the role, but at the same time he was protective, not just of his character, but of the entire show.

A contract dispute between O'Connor and Lear marred the beginning of the show's fifth season. Eventually O'Connor received a raise and appeared in the series until it ended. For his work as Archie Bunker, he was nominated for eight Emmy Awards as Outstanding Lead Actor in a Comedy Series; he won the award four times (1972, 1977, 1978 and 1979). He also won a Golden Globe Award in 1972. At the end of the eighth season in 1978, Reiner and Struthers left the series to pursue other projects.

Rob Reiner said in a 2014 interview about his on- and off-screen chemistry with O'Connor: "We did over 200 shows in front of a live audience. So I learned a lot about what audiences like, what they don't like, how stories are structured. I would spend a lot of time in the writing room and I actually wrote some scripts. And from Carroll O'Connor I learned a lot about how you perform and how important the script and story are for the actors. So the actor doesn't have to push things. You can let the story and the dialogue support you if it's good. I had great people around me, and I took from all the people who were around." Comparing O'Connor's character to Archie Bunker, Reiner said: "Carroll O'Connor brought his humanity to the character even though he had these abhorrent views. He's still a feeling human being. He loved his wife even though he acted the way he did, and he loved his daughter. Those things come out. I don't think anybody's all good or all bad."

==== Archie Bunker's Place ====
When All in the Family ended after nine seasons, Archie Bunker's Place continued in its place and ran from 1979 to 1983. Longtime friend and original series star Jean Stapleton appeared as Edith Bunker on the new show, but made only five guest appearances during the first season. Stapleton decided she did not want to continue in the role, and in the second-season premiere, it was revealed that her character had died of a stroke, leaving Archie to cope with the loss. At the time, O'Connor was receiving $200,000 an episode, making him one of the highest paid stars on television. The show was canceled in 1983. O'Connor was angered about the show's cancellation, maintaining that the show ended with an inappropriate finale. He later worked for CBS again when he starred in In the Heat of the Night on NBC and they decided not to renew the series. CBS allowed the series to continue for two more years and have a proper ending.

==== In the Heat of the Night ====
While coping with his son's drug problem, O'Connor starred as Sparta, Mississippi, Police Chief Bill Gillespie, a tough veteran cop on In the Heat of the Night. Based on the novel by John Ball and the 1967 movie of the same name. The series debuted on NBC in March 1988 and performed well. He cast his inexperienced son Hugh O'Connor as Officer Lonnie Jamison. The headquarters of the Sparta Police Department was actually the library in Covington, Georgia.

In 1989, while working on the set, O'Connor was hospitalized and underwent open heart surgery, which caused him to miss four episodes at the end of the second season. Actor Joe Don Baker took his place in those episodes as an acting police chief. O'Connor later served as one of the executive producers for the series, starting with the third season. In 1992, the series was transferred from NBC to CBS. In 1994, it was cancelled after its seventh season. From October 1994 to May of 1995, O'Connor reprised his role in four two-hour In the Heat of the Night television films. For his work on the series, O'Connor won an Emmy Award as Outstanding Lead Actor in a Drama Series in 1989.

While on the series, O'Connor recorded "Bring a Torch, Jeanette Isabella" for the 1991 In the Heat of the Night Christmas CD Christmas Time's A Comin'. He was joined by Grand Ole Opry star mandolinist Jesse McReynolds, Nashville accordionist Abe Manuel Jr., and Nashville fiddlers Buddy Spicher and Randall Franks. CD Producer and series co-star Randall Franks created the arrangement which was co-produced by series co-star Alan Autry. He joined other members of the cast for a recording of "Jingle Bells" with vocals by Country Music Hall of Fame members Little Jimmy Dickens, Kitty Wells, Pee Wee King, The Marksmen Quartet, Bobby Wright, Johnnie Wright and Ken Holloway. According to MeTV, O'Connor wrote several episodes under the pseudonym Matt Harris.

=== Later roles ===
In the late 1990s, O'Connor had a recurring role on the teen drama series Party of Five as Jacob "Jake" Gordon, the Salingers' maternal grandfather. He also appeared on several episodes of the sitcom Mad About You as Gus Stemple, the father of Helen Hunt's character. His final role was playing the grandfather of Minnie Driver's character in the romantic film Return to Me (2000).

== Career honors ==
- Golden Globe Award for Best Actor – Television Series Musical or Comedy, 1972, All in the Family
- Primetime Emmy Award for Outstanding Lead Actor in a Comedy Series, 1971, 1976, 1977, and 1978, All in the Family
- George Foster Peabody Broadcasting Award, 1980, for Archie Alone episode, Archie Bunker's Place
- Primetime Emmy Award for Outstanding Lead Actor in a Drama Series, 1989, In the Heat of the Night
- Golden Globe Award for Best Actor – Television Series Drama, 1989, In the Heat of the Night
- Golden Globe Award for Best Actor – Television Series Drama nomination 1990, In the Heat of the Night'
- Television Academy Hall of Fame, inducted 1990 for contributions to the television industry
- NAACP Image Award, 1992, In the Heat of the Night Best Dramatic Series
- NAACP Image Award, 1993, In the Heat of the Night Best Dramatic Series

=== Other honors ===
In 1971, he became a lifelong member of the Actors Studio.

In 1973, his fraternity conferred its highest honor, the Sigma Phi Epsilon Citation, on him.

He was the visual template in the creation of Batman nemesis Rupert Thorne, a character who debuted at the height of All in the Family's success in Detective Comics No. 469, published May 1976 by DC Comics.

O'Connor was the first male actor to have won the lead acting Emmy Award in both the comedy and drama series categories.

In July 1991, O'Connor, Jean Stapleton, Reiner, and Sally Struthers reunited to celebrate the 20th anniversary of All in the Family. With reruns airing in syndication on TV Land, Antenna TV and CBS, the show's popularity continued.

In March 2000, O'Connor received a star on the Hollywood Walk of Fame and was given a St. Patrick's Day tribute by MGM.

O'Connor's caricature is displayed at Sardi's restaurant in New York City's Theater District.

== Personal life ==
In 1962, while he was in Rome filming Cleopatra, O'Connor and his wife Nancy Fields O'Connor adopted a six-day-old boy, naming him Hugh after O'Connor's brother who had died a year earlier. At age 17, Hugh worked as a courier on the set of Archie Bunker's Place. O'Connor eventually created the role of Officer Lonnie Jamison on In the Heat of the Night for his son.

O'Connor was a devout Catholic who regularly attended Mass.

In 1989, O'Connor was admitted to the hospital for heart bypass surgery and quit his 30-year smoking habit.

On March 28, 1995, O'Connor's son Hugh died by suicide after a long-time struggle with drug addiction. His son's suicide inspired him to start a crusade against the man who had sold the drugs to Hugh. He called Harry Perzigian "a partner in murder" and a "sleazeball", and Perzigian countered with a defamation lawsuit against O'Connor. In 1997, a California jury decided in O'Connor's favor.

During the late 1990s, O'Connor established a small automotive restoration shop in Newbury Park, California. Called Carroll O'Connor Classics, the shop contained many of O'Connor's personal vehicles and the cars once owned by his late son.

In 1997, the O'Connors donated US$1 million, equivalent to $2,005,597 in 2025, to their alma mater to help match a challenge grant to the University of Montana from the National Endowment for the Humanities. The university named a regional studies and public policy institute the O'Connor Center for the Rocky Mountain West.

== Death ==
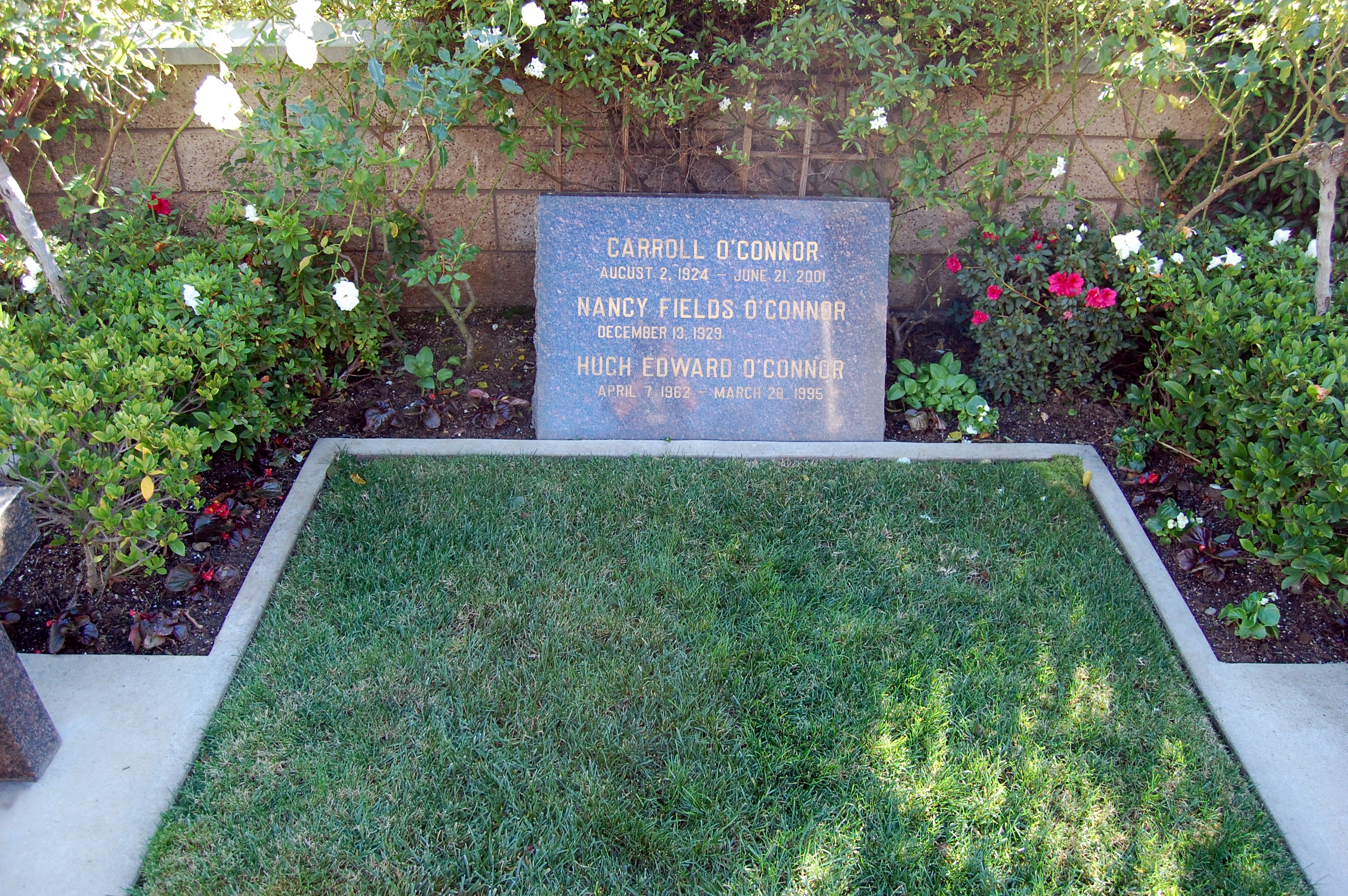
O'Connor's grave

O'Connor died at age 76 on June 21, 2001, in Culver City, California, from a heart attack brought on by complications from diabetes. His funeral mass was celebrated at St. Paul the Apostle Catholic Church in Westwood, and was attended by All in the Family cast members Rob Reiner, Sally Struthers, Danielle Brisebois, and producer Norman Lear. Jean Stapleton, a close friend of O'Connor's since the early 1960s and his All in the Family co-star, was unable to attend the service because of a commitment for a stage performance.

O'Connor's best friend Larry Hagman and his family attended the funeral, along with the surviving cast of In the Heat of the Night, including Alan Autry and Denise Nicholas. Actor Martin Sheen, then starring on The West Wing, delivered the eulogy. O'Connor was interred at Westwood Village Memorial Park Cemetery with his son Hugh's cenotaph placed on his gravestone.

In honor of O'Connor's career, TV Land moved an entire weekend of programming to the following week in order to show a continuous marathon of All in the Family. During the commercial breaks, TV Land showed interview footage of O'Connor and All in the Family actors, producers with whom he had worked, and other associates. His wife, Nancy Fields O'Connor, died on November 10, 2014, at age 84.

== Filmography ==
=== Actor ===
==== Film ====
Year	Title	Role	Notes
1950	Convicted	Correction Officer	uncredited
1958	The Defiant Ones	Truck Driver	uncredited
1961	A Fever in the Blood	Matt Keenan	
1961	Parrish	Firechief	uncredited
1961	By Love Possessed	Bernie Breck	
1962	Lonely Are the Brave	Hinton	
1962	Lad: A Dog	Hamilcar Q. Glure	
1963	Cleopatra	Casca	
1965	In Harm's Way	Lieutenant Commander Burke	
1966	What Did You Do in the War, Daddy?	General Bolt	
1966	Hawaii	Charles Bromley	
1966	Not with My Wife, You Don't!	General Maynard C. Parker	
1967	Warning Shot	Paul Jerez	
1967	Point Blank	Brewster	
1967	Waterhole #3	Sheriff John Copperud	
1968	The Devil's Brigade	Major General Maxwell Hunter	
1968	For Love of Ivy	Frank Austin	
1969	Death of a Gunfighter	Lester Locke	
1969	Marlowe	Lieutenant Christy French	
1970	Kelly's Heroes	General Colt	
1971	Doctors' Wives	Dr. Joe Gray	
1974	Law & Disorder	Willie	
1998	Gideon	Leo Barnes	
2000	Return to Me	Marty O'Reily	

==== Television ====
Year	Title	Role	Notes
1951	The Whiteheaded Boy	Donagh Brosnan	TV movie
1960	The Citadel	Dr. Llewellyn	TV movie
1960	Sunday Showcase	Frederick Katzman	2 episodes
1960	The United States Steel Hour	Tom O'Bryne	"Shadow of a Pale Horse"
1960	Adventures in Paradise	Henry Greshham	"Hangman's Island"
1960	Shirley Temple's Storybook	Appleyard	"The Black Arrow"
1960–61	Armstrong Circle Theatre	Doc Turner/Rudolf Höß/Rudolf Höess/Stanley Morgan	4 episodes
1961	Play of the Week	unknown role	"He Who Gets Slapped"
1961	The Aquanauts	The Lieutenant	"The Double Adventure"
1961	The Americans	Captain Garbor	"The Coward"
1961–62	The Untouchables	Arnie Kurtz/Barney Lubin	2 episodes
1962	Belle Sommers	Mr. Griffith	TV movie
1962	Naked City	Tony Corran/Owen Oliver	2 episodes
1962–63	The Dick Powell Theatre	Dr. Lyman Savage/Leonard Barsevick	2 episodes
1962–63	The Defenders	Dr. Hugh Morgan/Joshua Ryder	2 episodes
1962–65	Ben Casey	Dr. Wendel Clarke/Father Joseph McGavin	2 episodes
1962–65	Dr. Kildare	David Burnside/Roy Drummond	2 episodes
1963	Death Valley Days	Senator Dave Broderick	"A Gun Is Not a Gentleman"
1963	Stoney Burke	Harry Clark	"Web of Fear"
1963	Alcoa Premiere	Charles Compion	"The Dark Labyrinth"
1963	The Eleventh Hour	Dr. Ben Conway	"Pressure Breakdown"
1963	Bonanza	Tom Slayen	"The Boss"
1963	East Side/West Side	George Audette	"Age of Consent"
1963	The Silver Burro	unknown role	TV movie
1963	The DuPont Show of the Week	N.S. Kellogg	"The Silver Burro"
1963–64	The Great Adventure	Johann Sutter/O'Rourke	2 episodes
1964	The Outer Limits	Deimos	"Controlled Experiment"
1964	The Fugitive	Sheriff Bray	"Flight from the Final Demon"
1964	The Man from U.N.C.L.E.	Walter B. Brach	"The Green Opal Affair"
1964	Voyage to the Bottom of the Sea	Old John	"Long Live the King"
1964	The Yellowbird	unknown role	TV movie
1964–66	Bob Hope Presents the Chrysler Theatre	Captain Ted Eyck/Lawson	2 episodes
1965	Profiles in Courage	Grover Cleveland	"Grover Cleveland"
1965	Slattery's People	Lieutenant Wayne Altman/Victor Newleaf	2 episodes
1966	I Spy	Karolyi	"It's All Done with Mirrors"
1966	The Time Tunnel	General Southall/Colonel Phil Southall	"The Last Patrol"
1966	The Wild Wild West	Fabian Lavendor	"The Night of the Ready-Made Corpse"
1966–67	Gunsmoke	Major Vanscoy/Hootie Kyle	2 episodes
1967	Mission: Impossible	Josef Varsh	"The Trial"
1967	That Girl	Giuseppe Casanetti	"A Tenor's Loving Care"
1967	Dundee and the Culhane	McJames	"The Duelist Brief"
1967–70	Insight	Kelly/Clerk	2 episodes
1968	Premiere	James Van Ducci	"Walk in the Sky"
1968	Justice for All	Archie Justice	TV movie
1969	Fear No Evil	Myles Donovan	TV movie
1969	Ride a Northbound Horse	Mr. Davis	2 episodes
1969–70	The Governor & J.J.	Orrin Hacker	2 episodes
1971	Rowan & Martin's Laugh-In	Himself (Guest Performer)	"Carroll O'Connor"
1971	The Sonny & Cher Comedy Hour	The CBS Censor	"Glenn Ford, Carroll O'Connor, Robert Merrill, Harvey Korman, Steve Martin"
1971	Dinah's Place	Himself (Guest)	12.28.1971
1971–73	The Dean Martin Show	Himself (Guest)	2 episodes
1971-79	All in the Family	Archie Bunker/Archie Justice	series regular (208 episodes)
1972	Of Thee I Sing	John P. Wintergreen	TV movie
1972	The ABC Comedy Hour	Himself (Guest)	"The Friars Roast Sammy Davis Jr."
1972	The Electric Company	Himself (Guest)	"166"
1972–89	The Tonight Show Starring Johnny Carson	Himself (Guest)	10 episodes
1973	The TV Comedy Years	unknown role	TV movie
1974	Dinah!	Himself (Guest)	3 episodes
1974–76	Tony Orlando and Dawn	Himself (Guest)	3 episodes
1975	Sammy and Company	Himself (Guest)	"Carroll O'Connor/Vicki Lawrence/Waylon Jennings/Willie Tyler & Lester"
1976	American Bandstand	Himself (Guest)	"#19.37"
1976	Saturday Night Live	Himself (uncredited)	"Norman Lear/Boz Scaggs"
1977	The Last Hurrah	Frank Skeffington	TV movie
1977	The Jacksons	Himself (Guest)	"Carroll O'Connor"
1977	An All-Star Tribute to Elizabeth Taylor	Himself	Documentary
1979–83	Archie Bunker's Place	Archie Bunker	series regular (97 episodes)
1982	Gloria	Archie Bunker	"Gloria, the First Day"
1985	Brass	Frank Nolan	TV movie
1985	The GLO Friends Save Christmas	Santa Claus (voice role)	TV movie
1986	The Redd Foxx Show	Pat Cleary	"Old Buddies"
1986	Convicted	Lewis May	TV movie
1987	The Father Clements Story	Cardinal Cody	TV movie
1988–95	In the Heat of the Night	Chief/Sheriff William O. "Bill" Gillespie	series regular (146 episodes)
1989–91	The Arsenio Hall Show	Himself (Guest)	2 episodes
1996	Party of Five	Jacob Gordon/Jake Gordon	recurring role (6 episodes)
1996–99	Mad About You	Gus Stemple	recurring role (4 episodes)
1997	The Tonight Show with Jay Leno	Himself (Guest)	#5.134"
1998	The Rosie O'Donnell Show	Himself (Guest)	"03.04.1998"
1999	36 Hours to Die	Jack "Balls" O'Malley	TV movie
2000	Donny & Marie	Himself (Guest)	"04.24.2000"
2000	E! True Hollywood Story	Himself	"All in the Family"
2001	Biography	Himself	"Carroll O'Connor: All in the Family"

==== Theater ====
Year	Title	Role	Notes
1959	God and Kate Murphy	Patrick Molloy understudy/Assistant Stage Manager	12 performances
1983	Brothers	Jim/Director	7 previews; 1 performance
1985	Home Front	Bob	11 previews; 13 performances

=== Other ===
Year	Title	Contribution	Role	Notes
1971–79	All in the Family	Composer/Lyricist/Performer		Composer/Lyricist: Closing theme "Remembering You" (194 episodes); Performer: "Those Were the Days" (207 episodes)
1973	Carroll O'Connor Special	Writer	Himself	TV special
1979–83	Archie Bunker's Place	Composer		Closing theme (97 episodes)
1975–76	Bronk	Creator/Executive Producer/Executive Consultant		Creator (25 episodes); Executive Producer: "Pilot"; Executive Consultant (24 episodes)
1977	The Banana Company	Executive Producer		TV movie
1977	The Last Hurrah	Executive Producer/Writer		TV movie
1979	Bender	Executive Producer		TV movie
1980–82	Archie Bunker's Place	Director/Story Editor/Writer		Director (9 episodes); Story Editor: 27 episodes Writer: 1 episode Story by: 2 episodes
1981	Man, Myth and Titans	Writer		TV movie documentary (teleplay)
1985	Brass	Executive Producer/Writer		TV movie
1986	The Merv Griffin Show	Music		7.11.1986 Music: "Remembering You"
1986	The Redd Foxx Show	Director/Writer		"Old Buddies"
1988–95	In the Heat of the Night	Director/Story Editor/Writer/Supervising Producer/Executive Producer/Lyricist		Director (4 episodes); Story Editor (46 episodes); Writer (20 episodes); Story by (4 episodes); Teleplay (3 episodes); Supervising Producer (Episode: "Fairest of Them All"); Executive Producer (115 episodes); Lyricist: (2 episodes) — "When the Music Stopped" (1992); Original Song "About a Mile" — "Ches and the Grand Lady" (1994); Original Song "Gray Sundays In"

== Bibliography ==
- I Think I'm Outta Here (ISBN 0-671-01760-8) (1999) Autobiography

== Accolades ==
=== Emmy Awards ===
Year/Ceremony	Category	Title	Results	Ref
1971 – 23rd Primetime Emmy Awards	Outstanding Lead Actor in a Comedy Series	All in the Family	Nominated	
1972 – 24th Primetime Emmy Awards	Outstanding Lead Actor in a Comedy Series	All in the Family	Won	
1973 – 25th Primetime Emmy Awards	Outstanding Lead Actor in a Comedy Series	All in the Family	Nominated	
1974 – 26th Primetime Emmy Awards	Outstanding Lead Actor in a Comedy Series	All in the Family	Nominated	
1975 – 27th Primetime Emmy Awards	Outstanding Lead Actor in a Comedy Series	All in the Family	Nominated	
1977 – 29th Primetime Emmy Awards	Outstanding Lead Actor in a Comedy Series	All in the Family	Won	
1978 – 30th Primetime Emmy Awards	Outstanding Lead Actor in a Comedy Series	All in the Family	Won	
1979 – 31st Primetime Emmy Awards	Outstanding Lead Actor in a Comedy Series	All in the Family	Won	
1989 – 41st Primetime Emmy Awards	Outstanding Lead Actor in a Drama Series	In the Heat of the Night	Won	
1989 – 41st Primetime Emmy Awards	Hall of Fame	Television	Honoree	

=== Golden Globes ===
Year/Ceremony	Category	Title	Results	Ref
1972 — 29th Golden Globes	Best Performance by an Actor in a Television — Comedy or Musical	All in the Family	Won	
1973 – 30th Golden Globes	Best Performance by an Actor in a Television — Comedy or Musical	All in the Family	Nominated	
1974 — 31st Golden Globes	Best Performance by an Actor in a Television — Comedy or Musical	All in the Family	Nominated	
1975 – 32nd Golden Globes	Best Performance by an Actor in a Television — Comedy or Musical	All in the Family	Nominated	
1976 — 33rd Golden Globes	Best Performance by an Actor in a Television — Comedy or Musical	All in the Family	Nominated	
1978 – 34th Golden Globes	Best Performance by an Actor in a Television — Comedy or Musical	All in the Family	Nominated	
1989 – 45th Golden Globes	Best Performance by an Actor in a Television Series — Drama	In the Heat of the Night	Nominated	
1990 – 46th Golden Globes	Best Performance by an Actor in a Television Series — Drama	In the Heat of the Night	Nominated	
1991 – 47th Golden Globes	Best Performance by an Actor in a Television Series — Drama	In the Heat of the Night	Nominated	
1992 – 49th Golden Globes	Best Performance by an Actor in a Television Series — Drama	In the Heat of the Night	Nominated	
1994 – 51st Golden Globes	Best Performance by an Actor in a Television Series — Drama	In the Heat of the Night	Nominated	

=== Walk of Fame ===
Year/Ceremony	Category	Result	Ref
2000 – March 17, 2000	Television — 7080 Hollywood, Blvd.	Honoree	
