= All in the Family =

American sitcom (1971–1979)

- Genre: Sitcom
- Based on: Till Death Us Do Part by Johnny Speight
- Developed by: Norman Lear
- Directed by: John Rich (seasons 1, 2, 3, 4); Bob LaHendro (seasons 3, 4); Various (season 3); H. Wesley Kenney (season 5); Paul Bogart (seasons 6–9)
- Starring: Carroll O'Connor; Jean Stapleton; Sally Struthers; Rob Reiner; Danielle Brisebois
- Theme music composer: Lee Adams (lyrics), Charles Strouse (music), Roger Kellaway (ending theme)
- Opening theme: "Those Were the Days"; Performed by Carroll O'Connor and Jean Stapleton
- Ending theme: "Remembering You" by Roger Kellaway (music) and Carroll O'Connor (additional lyrics added in 1971; instrumental version)
- Country of origin: United States
- No. of seasons: 9
- No. of episodes: 205 (list of episodes)

Production
- Production locations: CBS Television City; Hollywood, California (1971–75); Metromedia Square; Hollywood, California (1975–79)
- Running time: 25–26 minutes
- Production company: Tandem Productions

Original release
- Network: CBS
- Release: January 12, 1971 – April 8, 1979

Related
- The Jeffersons; Archie Bunker's Place; Maude; Gloria; Good Times; Checking In; 704 Hauser

All in the Family is an American sitcom television series that aired on CBS for nine seasons from January 12, 1971, to April 8, 1979, with a total of 205 episodes. It was followed by Archie Bunker's Place, a continuation series, which picked up where All in the Family ended and ran for four seasons through April 4, 1983.

Based on the British sitcom Till Death Us Do Part, All in the Family was produced by Norman Lear and Bud Yorkin. It starred Carroll O'Connor, Jean Stapleton, Sally Struthers, and Rob Reiner. The show revolves around the life of a working-class man and his family. The series became arguably one of American television's most influential comedies, as it injected the sitcom format with more dramatic moments and realistic, topical conflicts. (Note: When the show premiered on January 12, 1971, CBS ran a disclaimer before it aired: "The program you are about to see is All in the Family. It seeks to throw a humorous spotlight on our frailties, prejudices, and concerns. By making them a source of laughter we hope to show, in a mature fashion, just how absurd they are.")

All in the Family has been frequently ranked as one of the best American television series. The show became the most watched show in the United States during summer reruns of the first season and topped the yearly Nielsen ratings from 1971 to 1976, the first television series to have held the position for five consecutive years. The episode "Sammy's Visit" was ranked number 13 on TV Guide's 100 Greatest Episodes of All Time. TV Guide's 50 Greatest TV Shows of All Time ranked All in the Family as number four. Bravo also named the show's protagonist, Archie Bunker, TV's greatest character of all time.

== Premise ==
All in the Family centers on a working-class White American family living in Queens, New York. Its patriarch, Archie Bunker (O'Connor), is an outspoken, narrow-minded man, seemingly prejudiced against everyone not like him or not holding his ideas of how people should be. Archie's wife, Edith (Stapleton), is sweet and understanding, which can make her appear naive and uneducated. Her husband often treats her dismissively and uses disparaging language, calling her "dingbat".

Their one child, Gloria (Struthers), is generally kind and good-natured like her mother but displays traces of her father's stubbornness and temper. Unlike them, she is a feminist. Gloria is married to college student, later graduate student, later college instructor Michael Stivic (Reiner)—referred to as "Meathead" by Archie—whose values are likewise influenced and shaped by the counterculture of the 1960s. The two couples represent the real-life clash of values between the Greatest Generation and Baby Boomers. For much of the series, the Stivics live in the Bunkers' home to save money, providing abundant opportunity for the family members to irritate one another.

The show is set in the Astoria section of Queens, with the vast majority of scenes taking place in the Bunkers' home at 704 Hauser Street. Occasional scenes take place in other locations, especially during later seasons, such as Kelcy's Bar, a neighborhood tavern that Archie spends a good deal of time at and eventually purchases, and the Stivics' home after Mike and Gloria move out.

Supporting characters represent the changing demographics of the neighborhood, especially the Jeffersons, a Black family, who live in the house next door in the early seasons and then leave the area for the higher-end Upper East Side of Manhattan after George (the husband) makes a fortune through his dry cleaning business. The Jeffersons then rented their home to Gloria and Mike.

== Cast ==
=== Main characters ===
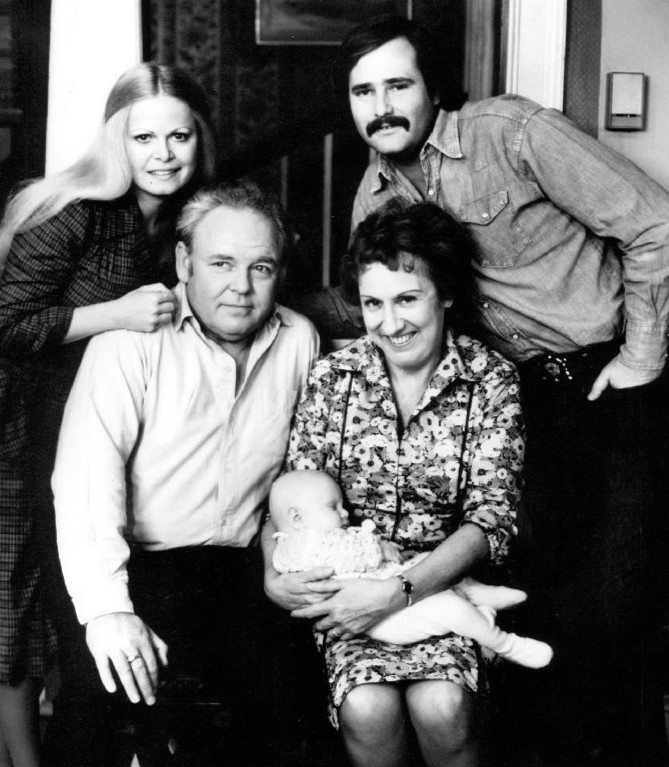
The Bunkers and the Stivics: standing, Gloria (Sally Struthers) and Michael (Rob Reiner). Seated, Archie (Carroll O'Connor) and Edith (Jean Stapleton) with baby Joey

- Carroll O'Connor as Archie Bunker: Frequently called a "lovable bigot", Archie is an assertively prejudiced blue-collar worker. A World War II veteran, Archie longs for better times when people sharing his viewpoint were in charge, as evidenced by the nostalgic theme song "Those Were the Days", also the show's original title. Despite his bigotry, he is portrayed as loving and decent, as well as a man who is simply struggling to adapt to the constantly changing world rather than someone motivated by hateful racism or prejudice. His ignorance and stubbornness seem to cause his malapropism-filled arguments to self-destruct. He often rejects uncomfortable truths by blowing a raspberry. Former child actor Mickey Rooney was Lear's first choice to play Archie, but Rooney declined the offer because of the strong potential for controversy and, in Rooney's opinion, its poor chance of success.
- Jean Stapleton as Edith Bunker, née Baines: Edith is Archie's ditzy but kind-hearted wife. Archie often tells her to "stifle" herself and calls her a "dingbat", and although Edith generally defers to her husband's authority and endures his insults, on the rare occasions when Edith takes a stand, she proves to exhibit simple but profound wisdom, although except for the one day she appears to be in menopause and makes even Archie 'stifle' himself. Despite their different personalities, they love each other deeply. Stapleton developed Edith's distinctive voice. Stapleton remained with the show through the original series run but decided to leave at that time. During the first season of Archie Bunker's Place, Edith is seen in five of the first fourteen episodes in guest appearances. After being set forth largely as an invisible character, Edith got written out as having suffered a stroke and died off-screen in the following season, leaving Archie to deal with the death of his beloved "dingbat". Stapleton appeared in all but four episodes of All in the Family. In the series' first episode, Edith is portrayed as being less of a dingbat and even sarcastically refers to her husband as "Mr. Religion here..." after they come home from church—something her character would not be expected to say later.
- Sally Struthers as Gloria Stivic, née Bunker: The Bunkers' college-age daughter is married to Michael Stivic. She has the generally kind nature of her mother but also the stubbornness of her father, which early in the series manifests as childishness and later as a more mature feminism. Gloria frequently attempts to mediate between her father and her husband, generally siding with the latter. The roles of the Bunkers' daughter and son-in-law (then named "Dickie") initially went to Candice Azzara and Chip Oliver. After seeing the show's pilot, ABC requested a second pilot after expressing dissatisfaction with both actors. Lear later recast the roles of Gloria and Dickie with Struthers and Reiner. Penny Marshall, Reiner's wife, whom he married in April 1971 shortly after the program began, was considered for the role of Gloria. During early seasons of the show, Struthers was known to feel discontented with how static her part was, and in 1974, she sued to get out of her contract, but the character became more developed, thereby satisfying her. Struthers appeared in 157 of the 202 episodes during the first eight seasons—from January 12, 1971, to March 19, 1978. She later reprised the role in the spin-off series Gloria, which lasted one season in 1982–1983.
- Rob Reiner as Michael "Meathead" Stivic: Gloria's Polish-American hippie husband is part of the counterculture of the 1960s. While good-hearted and well-meaning, he constantly spars with Archie and is equally stubborn, although his moral views are generally presented as more ethical and his logic somewhat sounder. He is the most-educated person in the household, which gives him a self-assured arrogance, and despite his intellectual belief in progressive social values, he tends to expect Gloria to defer to him as her husband. As discussed in All in the Family retrospectives, Richard Dreyfuss sought the part, but Norman Lear ultimately cast Reiner. Harrison Ford turned down the role, citing Archie Bunker's bigotry. Reiner appeared in 174 of the 202 episodes of the series during the first eight seasons—from January 12, 1971, to March 19, 1978. Reiner is credited with writing three of the series' episodes.
- Danielle Brisebois as Stephanie Mills, nine-year-old daughter of Edith's cousin Floyd and a regular throughout the ninth season. In addition to being thought cute and having a sweet side, she is smart and clever and makes her own remarks to Archie from time to time. The Bunkers take her in after her father abandons her on their doorstep in 1978. Her father later extorts money from the Bunkers to let them keep her. She remained with the show through its transition to Archie Bunker's Place and appeared in all four seasons of the continuation.

=== Supporting characters ===
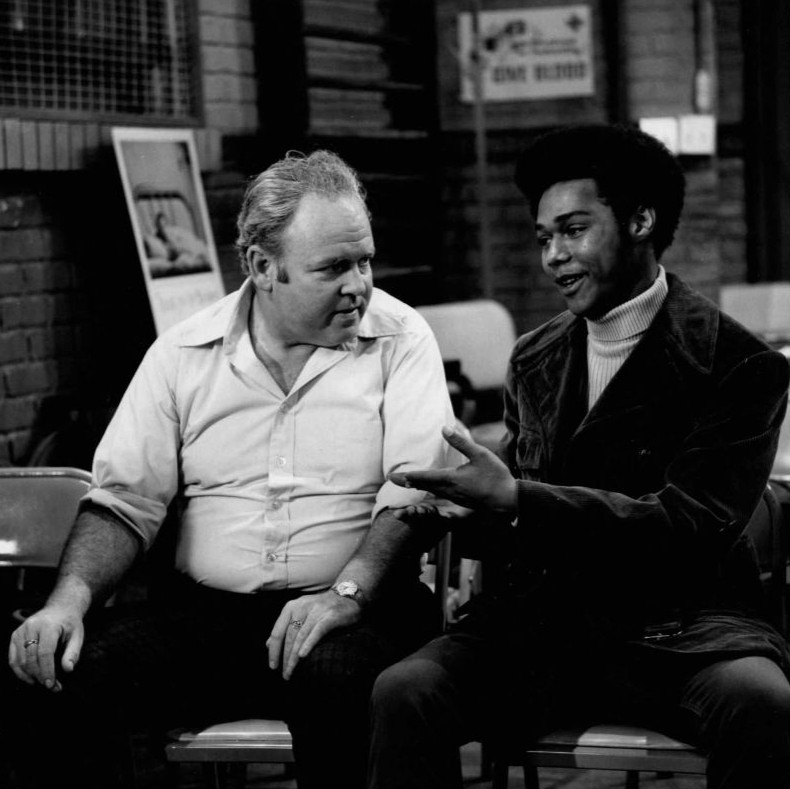
When Archie visits a local blood bank to make a donation, he meets his neighbor, Lionel Jefferson, who is there for the same purpose.

- Sherman Hemsley as George Jefferson, Isabel Sanford as his wife, Louise, and Mike Evans as their son, Lionel, Archie's Black neighbors: George is Archie's combative Black counterpart; Louise is a smarter, more assertive version of Edith. Lionel first appeared in the series' premiere episode "Meet the Bunkers"; Louise appeared later in the first season. Although George had been mentioned many times, he was not seen until 1973. Hemsley, who was Norman Lear's first choice to play George, was performing in the Broadway musical Purlie and did not want to break his commitment to that show. Lear kept the role waiting for him until he finished with the musical. Plots frequently found Archie and George at odds with each other while Edith and Louise attempted to join forces to bring about resolutions. George and Louise later moved to an apartment in Manhattan in their own show, The Jeffersons. Lionel appeared in All in the Family as a college student and aspiring electrical engineer who early on did odd jobs around the neighborhood, including television and radio repair.
- Mel Stewart as George's brother Henry Jefferson: The two appeared together only once, in a 1973 episode in which the Bunkers host Henry's going-away party, marking Stewart's final episode and Hemsley's first. After the Jeffersons were spun off into their own show in 1975, Stewart's character was rarely referred to again and was never seen. In the closing credits of "The First and Last Supper" episode, Mel Stewart is incorrectly credited as playing George Jefferson. Stewart was actually playing George's brother Henry Jefferson, who was pretending to be George for most of the episode. (seasons 1–4, 8 episodes)
- Bea Arthur as Edith's cousin Maude: Maude, white-collared and ultraliberal, serves as the perfect foil to Archie and one of his main antagonists. She appears in two episodes: "Cousin Maude's Visit", in which she takes care of the Bunker household when all four are sick, and "Maude" from the show's second season, which served as a backdoor pilot. Her spinoff series, Maude, began in fall 1972. (season 2, 2 episodes)
- Betty Garrett and Vincent Gardenia as liberal Roman Catholic next-door neighbors Irene and Frank Lorenzo: Both first appear as a married couple as Irene is trying to use the Bunkers' phone; During an argument earlier in the episode, Archie and Mike had broken the phone wire. Irene being a "handyman" of sorts with her own tools, which she carries in her purse, fixes it. Irene fixes many things at the Bunker house during her time on the show. She also has a sister who is a nun and appears in one episode. "Edith's Christmas Story" reveals that Irene has had a mastectomy. Archie gets her a job as a forklift operator at the warehouse where he works. Irene is a strong-willed woman of Irish heritage, and Frank is a jovial Italian househusband who loves cooking and singing. He is also a salesman, but what he sells is never mentioned. Gardenia, who also appeared as Jim Bowman in episode eight of season one (as the man who sold his house to the Jeffersons) and as Curtis Rempley in episode seven of season three (as a swinger opposite Rue McClanahan), became a semiregular along with Garrett in 1973. Gardenia stayed for only one season as Frank Lorenzo, but Garrett remained until her character was phased out in late 1975. (seasons 4–6)
- Allan Melvin as Archie's neighbor and good friend Barney Hefner: Barney first appeared in 1972 as a recurring character. His appearances increased during subsequent seasons until he became a regular. He appeared as a regular in all four seasons of Archie Bunker's Place. Melvin also appeared in second-season episode "Archie in the Lock-up" as a desk sergeant at a police precinct.
- Jason and Justin Draeger and Cory R. Miller as Joey Stivic, son of Gloria and Mike. The character first appeared as a newborn baby in a two-part episode of All in the Family that aired in December 1975, then continued to appear until Sally Struthers and Rob Reiner left the show in 1978, with another appearance when Archie and Edith visited Gloria and Mike in the ninth-season episode "California, Here We Are". Joey Stivic later appeared in an episode of Archie Bunker's Place, as a regular character in the spinoff series Gloria, and on the premiere episode of 704 Hauser, played by different actors.

=== Recurring characters ===
- James Cromwell as Jerome "Stretch" Cunningham (1973–1976) "The Funniest Man in The World", Archie's friend and co-worker from the loading dock (Archie claims that he is known as the "Bob Hope" of the loading platform): What Archie did not know was that Stretch was Jewish, evident only after Stretch died and Archie went to the funeral. Archie's eulogy (or "urology" as he called it) for his friend is often referred to as a rare occasion when he was capable of showing the humanity he tried so earnestly to hide. In the episode titled "Archie in the Cellar", Billy Sands is referred to as Stretch Cunningham, the voice on the tape recorder telling jokes. Sands also appeared as other characters on the show during its run, in Kelsey's Bar as a patron. (season 5, 3 episodes)
- Liz Torres as Theresa Betancourt (1976–1977): A Puerto Rican nursing student who meets Archie when he is admitted to the hospital for surgery. She later rents Mike and Gloria's former room at the Bunker house. She calls Archie "Papi". Torres joined All in the Family in the fall of 1976, but her character was not popular with viewers and the role was phased out before the end of the season. (season 7, 7 episodes)
- Billy Halop as Mr. Munson (1971–76), the cab driver who lets Archie drive his cab to make extra money. (seasons 1–3 & 5–6, 10 episodes)
- Bob Hastings as Kelcy or Tommy Kelsey, who owns the bar Archie frequents and later buys: Kelcy was also played by Frank Maxwell in the episode "Archie Gets The Business". The name of the establishment is Kelcy's Bar (as seen in the bar window in various episodes). Due to a continuity error, the end credits of episodes involving the bar owner spell the name "Kelcy" for the first two seasons and "Kelsey" thereafter, although the end credits show "Kelcy" in the "Archie Gets the Business" episode.
- Jason Wingreen as Harry Snowden, a bartender at Kelcy's Bar who continues to work there after Archie purchases it as his business partner: Harry had tried to buy the bar from Kelcy, but Archie was able to come up with the money first by taking a mortgage out on his house, which the Bunkers owned outright.
- Gloria LeRoy as Mildred "Boom-Boom" Turner, a buxom, middle-aged secretary at the plant where Archie works: She first appears when Archie is lost on his way to a convention and Mike and Gloria suspect he and she could be having an affair. Archie gave her that moniker as she was walking by the loading dock. He said when she walked, "Boom-Boom". She is not fond of Archie because he and Stretch leer at her and because of their sexist behavior, but later becomes friendly with him, occasionally working as a barmaid at Archie's Place. Gloria LeRoy also appeared in a third-season episode as "Bobbi Jo" Loomis, the wife of Archie's old war buddy "Duke".
- Barnard Hughes as Father John Majeski, a local Catholic priest who was suspected by Archie one time of trying to convert Edith: He appeared in multiple episodes. The first time was when Edith accidentally hit Majeski's car near the local supermarket with a can of cling peaches in heavy syrup. (seasons 2, 3 & 4, 3 episodes)
- Eugene Roche appeared as practical jokester friend and fellow lodge member "Pinky Peterson", one of Archie Bunker's buddies, in three episodes, first in the episode "Beverly Rides Again", then the Christmas Day episode "The Draft Dodger" (episode 146, 1976), and finally the episode "Archie's Other Wife". (seasons 7 & 9, 3 episodes)
- Sorrell Booke as Lyle Sanders, personnel manager at Archie's workplace, Prendergast Tool and Die Company. Booke had previously appeared on the series as Lyle Bennett, the manager of a local television station, in the episode "Archie and the Editorial" in season three.
- Lori Shannon as Beverly La Salle, a transvestite entertainer, who appeared in three episodes: "Archie the Hero", "Beverly Rides Again", and "Edith's Crisis of Faith". In that third episode, Mike and Beverly are attacked and Beverly dies in a hospital from injuries suffered during the fight.
- Estelle Parsons as Blanche Hefner (1977–1979), Barney's second wife: Blanche and Archie are not fond of one another, though Edith likes her very much. The character is mentioned throughout much of the series after Barney's first wife, Mabel, had died, though she only appeared in a handful of episodes during the last few seasons. Estelle Parsons also appeared in the season-seven episode "Archie's Secret Passion" as Dolores Fencel. (seasons 7 & 9)
- Bill Quinn as Mr. Edgar van Ranseleer (Mr. van R), a blind patron and regular at the bar: He is almost never referred to by his first name. In a running joke, Archie usually waves his hand in front of Mr. van R's face when he speaks to him. His role was later expanded on Archie Bunker's Place, where he appeared in all four seasons.
- Burt Mustin as Justin Quigley, a feisty octogenarian/nonagenarian: Mr. Quigley first appeared in the episode: "Edith Finds an Old Man" (season four, episode three, September 23, 1973) where he runs away from an old age home. He temporarily moves in with the Bunkers but quickly leaves to share an apartment with his friend Josephine "Jo" Nelson, played by Ruth McDevitt. He appeared in several other episodes, including "Archie's Weighty Problem". Mustin previously appeared in a first-season episode as Harry Feeney, the night watchman at Archie's workplace. (seasons 1, 4–6, 5 episodes)
- Nedra Volz as Aunt Iola, Edith's aunt. Mentioned several times in the eighth season, she stays with the Bunkers for two weeks. Edith wants her to move in, but Archie will not allow it, though when he believes Iola does not have any place to go, he tells her privately that she can always stay with them.
- Francine Beers and Jane Connell as Sybil Gooley, who works at Ferguson's Market: Frequently mentioned, usually by Edith, Sybil predicts that Gloria and Mike will be having a baby boy by performing a ring on a string "swing test" over Gloria's abdomen. Sybil also appeared in the episode "Edith's 50th Birthday" and spills the beans on her surprise party because she had not been invited. She and Archie do not get along, and he refers to her as a "Big Mouth".
- Rae Allen and Elizabeth Wilson as Edith's cousin Amelia DeKuyper: Archie detests Amelia and her husband, Russell, who are wealthy. Once, she sent Edith a mink and Archie wanted to send it back, until he found out how much it was worth. In another episode, Amelia and her husband visit the Bunkers to bring them gifts from a recent trip to Hawaii, but in a private moment, Amelia shares with Edith that, despite appearances, she and Russell are considering a divorce. The character was played by two different actresses in three episodes of the show.
- Richard Dysart and George S. Irving as Russell DeKuyper, Amelia's husband. He is a plumbing contractor who continued the business started by Amelia's father and uncles. He constantly flaunts his monetary wealth in front of Archie and looks askance at the way Archie lives, forgetting that he walked into a profitable plumbing business. He appears in two of the episodes that feature Amelia.
- Clyde Kusatsu as Reverend Chong: He refuses to baptize little Joey in season six, and then remarries Archie and Edith, and Mike and Gloria in season eight, and gives counsel to Stephanie in season nine as it was learned that she was Jewish. (seasons 6, 8 & 9, 3 episodes)
- Ruth McDevitt as Josephine "Jo" Nelson: The girlfriend of Justin Quigley, the older man Edith finds walking around the supermarket. She appeared in three episodes from seasons four through six. Gloria and Mike adopted them as their god grandparents. The most of any other characters, Archie takes a liking to Justin and Jo. She dies following the end of the sixth season. (Season 4 & 5, 3 episodes)
- William Benedict as Jimmy McNabb: The Bunkers' neighbor, he appeared in two episodes during the first and second seasons and was referred to many times during the first few seasons.
- Jack Grimes as Mr. Whitehead: A member of Archie's lodge and the local funeral director. The death of Archie's cousin Oscar in a season-two episode of All in the Family brings the very short, white-haired, and silver-tongued Whitehead with his catalog of caskets. (seasons 2 & 4, 2 episodes)

== History and production ==
Lear said the idea for All in the Family came to him after he read an article in Variety magazine on the successful British sitcom Till Death Us Do Part. He said he immediately knew it portrayed a relationship just like the one between his father and himself. However, in a 2025 episode of the podcast Let's Talk About That!, Sally Struthers disputed Lear's account and claimed that idea originated with O'Connor, who had seen Till Death Us Do Part during a visit to the U.K. O'Connor, she said, wanted to produce an American version but couldn't get the necessary backing as an actor alone. Eventually he suggested the idea to Lear who liked it and put it into production without crediting O'Connor. Struthers claimed that she waited until after Lear had died to reveal what she knew.

Lear bought the rights to the program and incorporated his own family experiences with his father into the show. Lear's father would tell Lear's mother to "stifle herself" and she would tell Lear's father "you are the laziest white man I ever saw" (two "Archieisms" that found their way onto the show).

The original pilot was titled Justice for All and was developed for ABC. Tom Bosley, Jack Warden, and Jackie Gleason were all considered for the role of Archie Bunker. In fact, CBS wanted to buy the rights to the original show and retool it specifically for Gleason, who was under contract to them, but producer Lear beat out CBS for the rights and offered the show to ABC. Mickey Rooney was offered the role but turned it down as he felt the character was "un-American".

In the pilot, Carroll O'Connor and Jean Stapleton played Archie and Edith Justice. Kelly Jean Peters played Gloria and Tim McIntire played her husband, Richard. It was taped in October 1968 in New York City. After screening the first pilot, ABC gave the producers more money to shoot a second pilot, titled Those Were the Days, which Lear taped in February 1969 in Hollywood. Candice Azzara played Gloria and Chip Oliver played her husband Dickie. D'Urville Martin played Lionel Jefferson in both pilots.

After stations' and viewers' complaints caused ABC to cancel Turn-On (a sketch comedy series developed by Laugh-In's George Schlatter) after only one episode in February 1969, the network became uneasy about airing a show with a "foul-mouthed, bigoted lead" character, and rejected the series at about the time Richard Dreyfuss sought the role of Michael. Rival network CBS was eager to update its image and was looking to replace much of its then popular "rural" programming (Mayberry R.F.D., The Beverly Hillbillies, Petticoat Junction and Green Acres) with more "urban", contemporary series and was interested in Lear's project; by this point, Gleason was no longer under contract to CBS (his own show was among those eliminated), allowing Lear to keep Carroll O'Connor on as the lead. CBS bought the rights from ABC and retitled the show All in the Family. The pilot episode CBS developed had the final cast and was the series' first episode.

Lear wanted to shoot in black and white as Till Death Us Do Part had been. While CBS insisted on color, Lear had the set furnished in neutral tones, keeping everything relatively devoid of color. As costume designer Rita Riggs described in her 2001 Archive of American Television interview, Lear's idea was to create the feeling of sepia tones, in an attempt to make viewers feel as if they were looking at an old family album.

All in the Family was the first major American series to be videotaped in front of a live studio audience. In the 1960s, most sitcoms had been filmed in the single-camera format without audiences, with a laugh track simulating an audience response; at that time, videotaping was mainly reserved for news programming and variety shows. Lear employed the multiple-camera format of shooting in front of an audience, but used tape, whereas previous multiple-camera shows like The Mary Tyler Moore Show had used film. Due to the success of All in the Family, videotaping sitcoms in front of an audience became a common format for the genre during the 1970s, onward, until the advent of digital HD. The use of videotape also gave All in the Family the look and feel of early live television, including the original live broadcasts of The Honeymooners, to which All in the Family is sometimes compared.

For the show's final season, the practice of being taped before a live audience changed to playing the already taped and edited show to an audience and recording their laughter to add to the original sound track, and the voice-over during the end credits were changed from Rob Reiner's voice "All in the Family was recorded on tape before a live audience", to Carroll O'Connor's "All in the Family was played to a studio audience for live responses." (Typically, the audience was gathered for a taping of One Day at a Time, and got to see All in the Family as a bonus.) Throughout its run, Norman Lear took pride in the fact that canned laughter was never used (mentioning this on many occasions); the laughter heard in the episodes was genuine.

=== Theme song ===
The series' opening theme song, "Those Were the Days", was written by Lee Adams (lyrics) and Charles Strouse (music). It is presented in a way that was unique for a 1970s series: Carroll O'Connor and Jean Stapleton are seated at a console or spinet piano (played by Stapleton) and sing the tune together on-camera at the start of every episode, concluding with applause from a studio audience. The song dates back to the first Justice for All pilot filmed in 1968, although on that occasion, O'Connor and Stapleton performed the song off-camera and at a faster tempo than the series version.

Six different performances were recorded over the run of the series, including one version that includes additional lyrics. The song is a simple, mostly pentatonic melody that can be played almost exclusively with black keys on a piano, with lyrics in which Archie and Edith express nostalgia for the past. A longer version of the song was released as a single on Atlantic Records, reaching number 43 on the US Billboard Hot 100 and number 30 on the Billboard Adult Contemporary chart in early 1972. The additional lyrics in this longer version lend the song a greater sense of sadness and make poignant reference to social changes taking place in the 1960s and early 1970s.

A few perceptible drifts can be observed when listening to each version chronologically. In the original version, the lyric "Those Were the Days" is sung over the tonic (root chord of the song's key), and the piano strikes a dominant 7th passing chord in transition to the next part, which is absent from subsequent versions.

Jean Stapleton originally struck a slightly sour note (deliberately) on the word "were" in the phrase "and you knew who you were then", which prompted laughter from the live audience; as the seasons progressed, she delivered this note as an increasingly exaggerated shriek. Carroll O'Connor's pronunciation of "welfare state" added more of Archie's trademark whining enunciation, and the closing lyrics (especially "Gee, our old LaSalle ran great") were sung with increasingly deliberate articulation, as viewers had complained that they could not understand the words. Also in the original version, the camera angle was shot slightly from the right side of the talent as opposed to the straight-on angle of the next version. Jean Stapleton performed the theme song without glasses beginning in season 6.

In addition to O'Connor and Stapleton singing, footage is also shown beginning with aerial shots of Manhattan, and continuing to Queens, progressively zooming in, culminating with a still shot of a lower-middle-class semidetached home, representing the Bunkers' house in Astoria, suggesting that the visit to the Bunkers' home has begun. The house shown in the opening credits is actually located at 89–70 Cooper Avenue in the Glendale section of Queens, New York.

A notable difference exists between the Cooper Avenue house and the All in the Family set: the Cooper Avenue house has no porch, while the Bunkers' home features a front porch. Since the footage used for the opening had been shot back in 1968 for the series' first pilot, the establishing shot of the Manhattan skyline does not feature the World Trade Center towers, which had not yet been built. When the series aired two years later, the Trade Center towers, although under construction, had still not yet risen high enough to become a prominent feature on the Manhattan skyline. This did not happen until the end of 1971.

Despite this change in the Manhattan skyline, the original, somewhat grainy 1968 footage continued to be used for the series opening until the series transitioned into Archie Bunker's Place in 1979. At that time, a new opening with current shots of the Manhattan skyline were used with the Trade Center towers being seen in the closing credits. This opening format showing actual footage of the cities and neighborhoods in which the show was set became the standard for most of Norman Lear's sitcoms, including others in the All in the Family franchise including Maude, Good Times, and The Jeffersons.

At the end of the opening, the camera then returns to a last few seconds of O'Connor and Stapleton as they finish the song. At the end of the original version, Edith smiles at Archie and Archie smiles off at a slight distance. In the longest running version (from season 2 to season 5), Edith smiles blissfully at Archie, and Archie puts a cigar in his mouth and returns a rather cynical, sheepish look to Edith. From season six through eight, Edith smiles and rests her chin on Archie's shoulder.

In the final season, Edith hugs Archie at the conclusion. In the first three versions of the opening, Archie is seen wearing his classic trademark white shirt. In the final version of the opening for the series' ninth season, Archie is seen wearing a gray sweater-jacket over his white shirt. In all versions of the opening, the song's conclusion is accompanied by applause from the studio audience.

In interviews, Norman Lear explained that the idea for the piano song introduction was a cost-cutting measure. After completion of the pilot episode, the budget would not allow an elaborate scene to serve as the sequence played during the show's opening credits. Lear decided to have a simple scene of Archie and Edith singing at the piano.

The closing theme, an instrumental, is "Remembering You", played by its composer Roger Kellaway, with lyrics later added by Carroll O'Connor. It's played over footage of the same row of houses in Queens as in the opening, but moving in the opposite direction down the street, and eventually moving back to aerial shots of Manhattan, suggesting the visit to the Bunkers' home has concluded. O'Connor recorded a vocal version of "Remembering You" for a record album, but though he performed it several times on TV appearances, the lyrics about the end of a romance were never heard in the actual series. In July 1986, vocalist Helen Merrill's contrastingly jazz-flavored rendition, accompanied by a Kellaway-led trio and introduced by O'Connor, was featured on The Merv Griffin Show.

Except for some brief instances in the first season, the show contains no incidental or transitional music.

=== Setting and location ===
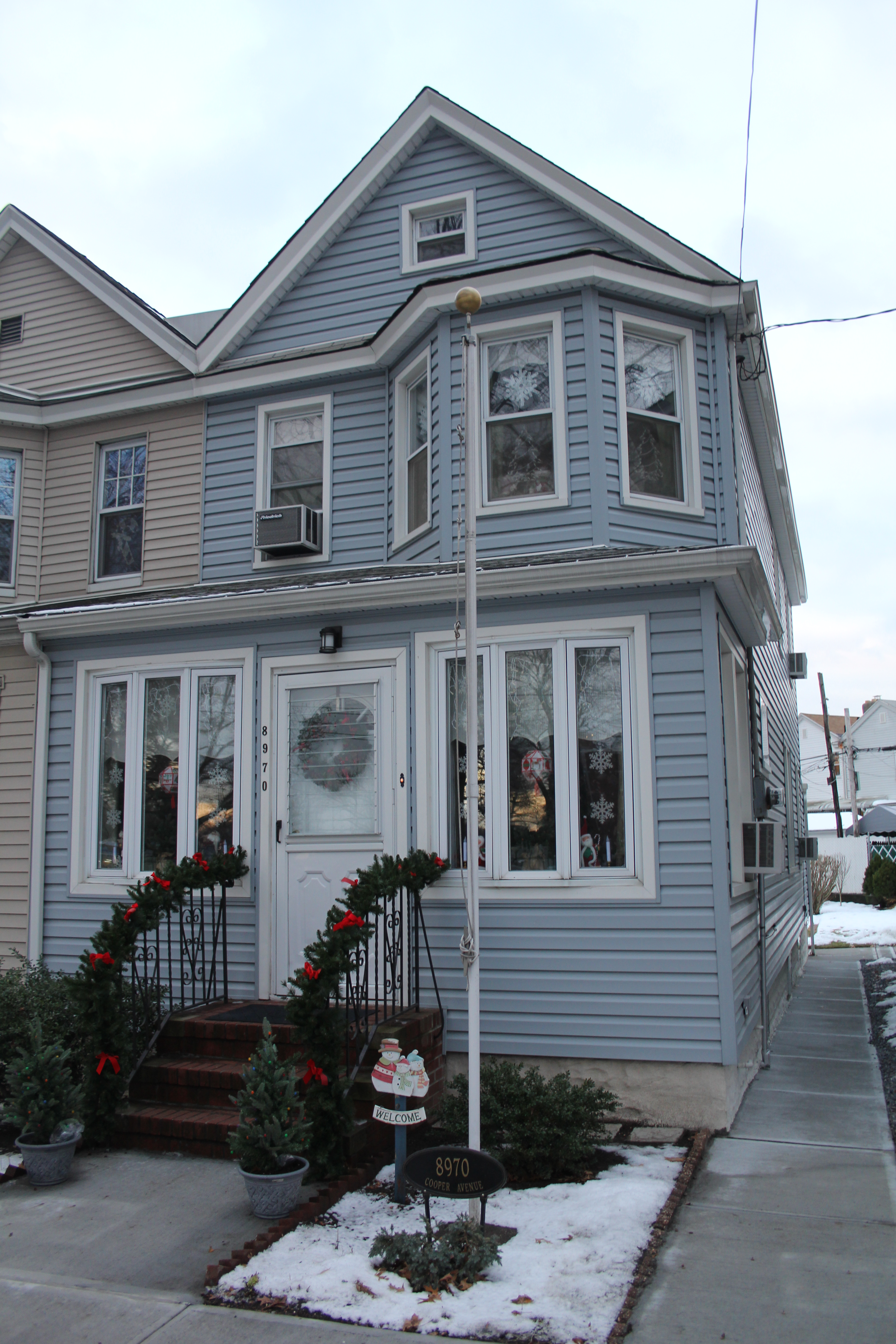
The house featured in the opening credits sequence, as it appeared in late 2013

Lear and his writers set the series in the Queens neighborhood of Astoria. The location of the Bunkers' house at 704 Hauser Street is fictitious. No Hauser Street exists in Queens. The address is not presented the way addresses are given in Queens: most address numbers are hyphenated, identifying the number of the nearest cross street. Nevertheless, many episodes reveal that the Bunkers live near the major thoroughfare Northern Boulevard, which was the location of Kelsey's Bar and later Archie Bunker's Place.

The exterior of the house shown in the opening credits is a home located at 89-70 Cooper Avenue, Glendale, Queens, New York, across from St. John Cemetery (40.712492°N 73.860784°W).

Many real Queens institutions are mentioned throughout the series. Carroll O'Connor, a Queens native from Forest Hills, said in an interview with the Archive of American Television that he suggested to the writers many of the locations to give the series authenticity. For example, Archie is said to have attended Flushing High School, a real school in Flushing, Queens, although in the "Man of the Year" episode of Archie Bunker's Place, Archie attended Bryant High School in nearby Long Island City. As another example, the 1976 episode "The Baby Contest" deals with Archie entering baby Joey in a cutest-baby contest sponsored by the Long Island Daily Press, a then-operating local newspaper in Queens and Long Island.

The writers of All in the Family continued throughout the series to have the Bunkers and other characters use telephone exchange names when giving a telephone number, even though the Bell System was trying then to discontinue the exchange names. (Most other series at the time, such as The Mary Tyler Moore Show, used the standard fictitious 555 telephone number). At different times throughout the series, the exchanges Ravenswood and Bayside—both valid in the area—were used for the Bunkers' telephone number. Actual residents of the Bunkers' age continued using exchange names into the early 1980s, which is referred to in the 1979 episode "The Appendectomy", in which Edith gets confused between the two versions of a number she is dialing.

== Episodes ==
Season	Episodes	Originally released		Rank	Rating
Season	Episodes	First released	Last released	Rank	Rating
Pilots	2	1968	1969	—N/a	—N/a
1	13	January 12, 1971	April 6, 1971	34	18.9
2	24	September 18, 1971	March 11, 1972	1	34.0
3	24	September 16, 1972	March 24, 1973	1	33.3
4	24	September 15, 1973	March 16, 1974	1	31.2
5	23	September 14, 1974	March 8, 1975	1	30.2
6	24	September 8, 1975	March 8, 1976	1	30.1
7	25	September 22, 1976	March 12, 1977	12	22.9
8	24	October 2, 1977	March 19, 1978	4	24.4 (Note: Tied with 60 Minutes and Charlie's Angels)
9	24	September 24, 1978	April 8, 1979	9	24.9 (Note: Tied with Taxi)

"Sammy's Visit", first broadcast in February 1972, is a particularly notable episode, whose famous episode-ending scene produced the longest sustained audience laughter in the history of the show. Guest star Sammy Davis Jr. plays himself. Archie is moonlighting as a cab driver and Davis visits the Bunker home to retrieve a briefcase he left in Archie's cab earlier that day. After hearing Archie's bigoted remarks, Davis asks for a photograph with him. At the moment the picture is taken, Davis suddenly kisses a stunned Archie on the cheek. The ensuing laughter went on for so long that it had to be severely edited for network broadcast, as Carroll O'Connor still had one line ("Well, what the hell—he said it was in his contract!") to deliver after the kiss. (The line is usually cut in syndication.)

=== Syndication ===
During the show's sixth season, starting on December 1, 1975, CBS began airing reruns on weekdays at 3 p.m. (EST), replacing long-running soap opera The Edge of Night, which moved to ABC. The show would later move to 3:30 p.m. and in September 1978, 10 a.m. This lasted until September 1979, when Viacom distributed the reruns to the off-network market where many stations picked up the show. In 1991, Columbia Pictures Television began syndicating the show, and Columbia's successor companies have continued to do so.

Since the late 1980s, All in the Family has been rerun on various cable and satellite networks including TBS (although it held the rights locally in Atlanta, as well), TV Land, Nick at Nite, and Sundance TV. From January 3, 2011, to December 31, 2017, the show aired on Antenna TV. As of January 1, 2018, the show began to air on GetTV. Since February 5, 2023, MeTV aired episodes of the show on Sunday nights at 8:00 p.m. ET/7:00 p.m. CT. All episodes have been airing nightly on the Catchy Comedy (formerly Decades) digital retro TV network, airing weeknights at 8:00 p.m. ET/7:00 p.m. CT.

The cast forfeited their residual rights for a cash payout early in the production run.

== Ratings ==
All in the Family is one of three television shows (The Cosby Show and the reality music competition American Idol being the others) that have been number one in the Nielsen ratings for five consecutive TV seasons. The show remained in the top 10 for seven of its nine seasons.

Season	Time slot	Nielsen ratings		
Season	Time slot	Rank	Rating	Households
1 (1970–71)	Tuesday at 9:30–10:00 p.m. on CBS	No. 34	18.9	11,358,900
2 (1971–72)	Saturday at 8:00–8:30 p.m. on CBS	No. 1	34.0	21,114,000
3 (1972–73)	Saturday at 8:00–8:30 p.m. on CBS	No. 1	33.3	21,578,400
4 (1973–74)	Saturday at 8:00–8:30 p.m. on CBS	No. 1	31.2	20,654,400
5 (1974–75)	Saturday at 8:00–8:30 p.m. on CBS	No. 1	30.2	20,687,000
6 (1975–76)	Monday at 9:00–9:30 p.m. on CBS	No. 1	30.1	20,949,600
7 (1976–77)	Wednesday at 9:00–9:30 p.m. on CBS (September 22 – October 27, 1976); Saturday at 9:00–9:30 p.m. on CBS (November 6, 1976 – March 12, 1977)	No. 12	22.9	16,304,800
8 (1977–78)	Sunday at 9:00–9:30 p.m. on CBS	No. 4	24.4 (tied with 60 Minutes and Charlie's Angels)	17,787,600
9 (1978–79)	Sunday at 9:00–9:30 p.m. on CBS (September 24 – October 1, 1978); Sunday at 8:00–8:30 p.m. on CBS (October 8, 1978 – April 8, 1979)	No. 9	24.9 (tied with Taxi)	18,550,500

The series finale was seen by 40.2 million viewers.

== Spin-offs ==
As of 2009, All in the Family has many spin-offs, directly spawning five other shows, three of which were very successful, as well as two of those spin-offs each having a spin-off of their own:

- The first spin-off was Maude, which debuted in September 1972. It features Edith's acerbic cousin Maude Findlay (Bea Arthur), who first appeared on All in the Family in the December 1971 episode "Cousin Maude's Visit", visiting to take care of the influenza-suffering Bunkers. In March 1972, at the end of the series' second season, the character was again featured in the episode "Maude". In this episode, a "backdoor pilot" for a new series, Archie and Edith visit her home in Westchester County to attend the wedding of her daughter Carol. Bill Macy played Maude's husband Walter and Marcia Rodd played Carol; Rodd was replaced by Adrienne Barbeau for the series. The show lasted for six seasons and 141 episodes, airing its final episode in April 1978.
  - Good Times is considered by some to be a spin-off of Maude, as the show's focus was Florida Evans, a character first appearing on Maude during its initial seasons as the Findlays' black maid. But the character's history and situation were changed for the new show. According to producer Allan Manings, "It wasn't really a spin-off." The show features no reference to Maude, changes the name of Florida's husband from Henry to James, and sets the show in a Chicago housing project. It ran for six seasons from February 1974 to August 1979.
- The second and longest-lasting spin-off of All in the Family was The Jeffersons. Debuting on CBS in January 1975, The Jeffersons lasted 11 seasons and 253 episodes (more than All in the Family's nine seasons and 208 episodes). The main characters were the Bunkers' black former next-door neighbors George and Louise Jefferson (Sherman Hemsley and Isabel Sanford). George was the owner of seven successful dry-cleaning stores, and the series featured their life after moving from the Bunkers' working-class neighborhood to a luxury high-rise apartment building in Manhattan's Upper East Side.
  - Checking In was spun off from The Jeffersons, focusing on the Jeffersons' maid Florence Johnston, working as an executive housekeeper at the St. Frederick Hotel in Manhattan. It only lasted four weeks in April 1981, and the character returned to her old job as the Jeffersons' maid.
- Archie Bunker's Place was technically a spin-off, but was essentially a renamed continuation of the series, beginning in September 1979 following the final season of the original. It was primarily set in the titular neighborhood tavern which Archie Bunker purchased in the eighth season of All in the Family. It aired for four seasons, until April 1983.
- Gloria was the third spin-off of All in the Family, focusing on now-divorced Gloria, starting a new life as an assistant trainee to a couple of veterinarians in Foxridge, New York. It premiered in September 1982, and ran for one season.
- 704 Hauser features the Bunkers' house with a new family, the Cumberbatches. It was an inversion of the formula of the original, featuring a liberal black couple with a conservative son, who is dating a Jewish woman. Gloria and Mike's son Joey Stivic, now in his 20s, makes a brief appearance in the first episode. Five episodes aired in April and May 1994. The sixth episode was unaired.

== Specials ==
At the height of the show's popularity, Henry Fonda hosted a special one-hour retrospective of All in the Family and its impact on American television. It included clips from the show's most memorable episodes up to that time. It was titled The Best of "All in the Family" and aired on December 21, 1974.

On February 16, 1991, CBS aired a 90-minute retrospective, All in the Family 20th Anniversary Special, hosted by Norman Lear to commemorate the show's 20th anniversary. It featured a compilation of clips from the show's best moments, and interviews with the four main cast members. The special was so well received by the viewing audience that CBS aired reruns of All in the Family during its summer schedule in 1991, garnering higher ratings than the new series scheduled next to it, Norman Lear's sitcom Sunday Dinner. The latter was Lear's return to TV series producing after a seven-year absence, and was canceled after the six-week tryout run due to being poorly received by audiences.

On May 22, 2019, ABC broadcast Live in Front of a Studio Audience: Norman Lear's All in the Family and The Jeffersons, produced by Lear and Jimmy Kimmel and starring Woody Harrelson, Marisa Tomei, Jamie Foxx, Wanda Sykes, Ike Barinholtz, Kerry Washington and Ellie Kemper.

A second Live in Front of A Studio Audience special was announced in early November 2019 to air on Wednesday December 18, this time pairing the show with Good Times.

== Home media ==
Sony Pictures Home Entertainment (formerly Columbia TriStar Home Entertainment) released the first six seasons of All in the Family on DVD in Region 1 between 2002 and 2007. No further seasons were released, because the sales figures did not match Sony's expectations.

In June 2010, Shout! Factory announced that it had acquired the rights to the series and has since released the remaining three seasons.

In October 2012, Shout! Factory released All in the Family – The Complete Series on DVD in Region 1. The 28-disc boxed set features all 208 episodes of the series, as well as bonus features.

In February 2018, Sony released All in the Family – Seasons 1–5 on DVD in Region 1. The 15-disc set features all episodes from the first five seasons.

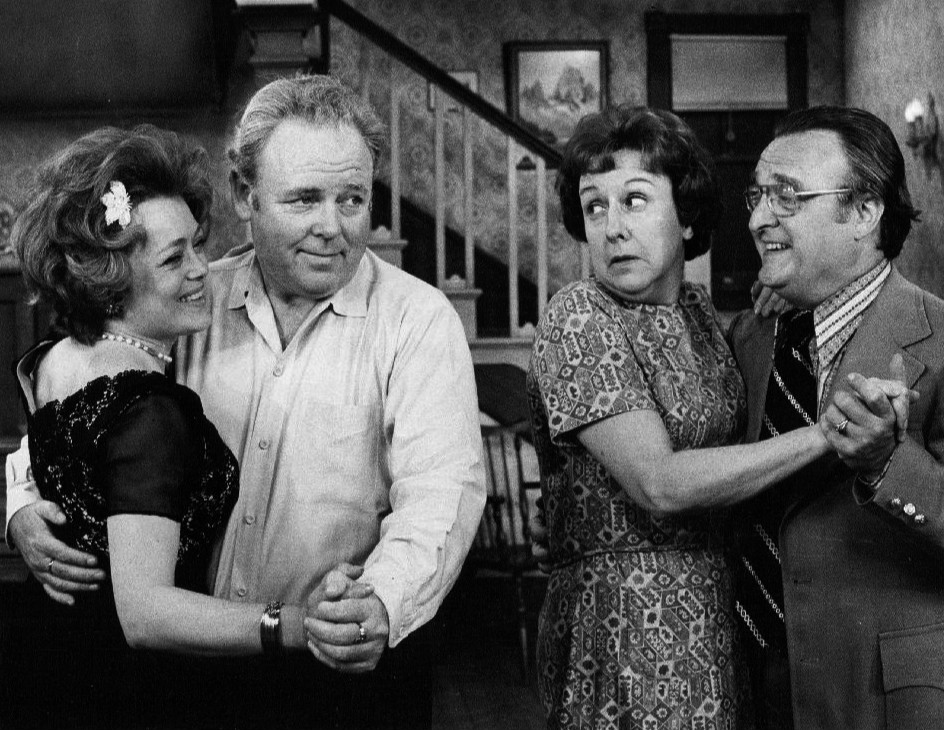
Vincent Gardenia, before becoming a regular cast member as Frank Lorenzo, and Rue McClanahan played a "wife-swapping" couple who meet the unsuspecting Bunkers in a 1972 episode. L–R: McClanahan, Carroll O'Connor, Jean Stapleton and Gardenia.

DVD name	Ep #	Release date
The Complete First Season	13	March 26, 2002
The Complete Second Season	24	February 4, 2003
The Complete Third Season	24	July 20, 2004
The Complete Fourth Season	24	April 12, 2005
The Complete Fifth Season	23	January 3, 2006
The Complete Sixth Season	24	February 13, 2007
The Complete Seventh Season	25	October 5, 2010
The Complete Eighth Season	24	January 11, 2011
The Complete Ninth Season	24	May 17, 2011
The Complete Series	208	October 30, 2012

== Cultural impact ==
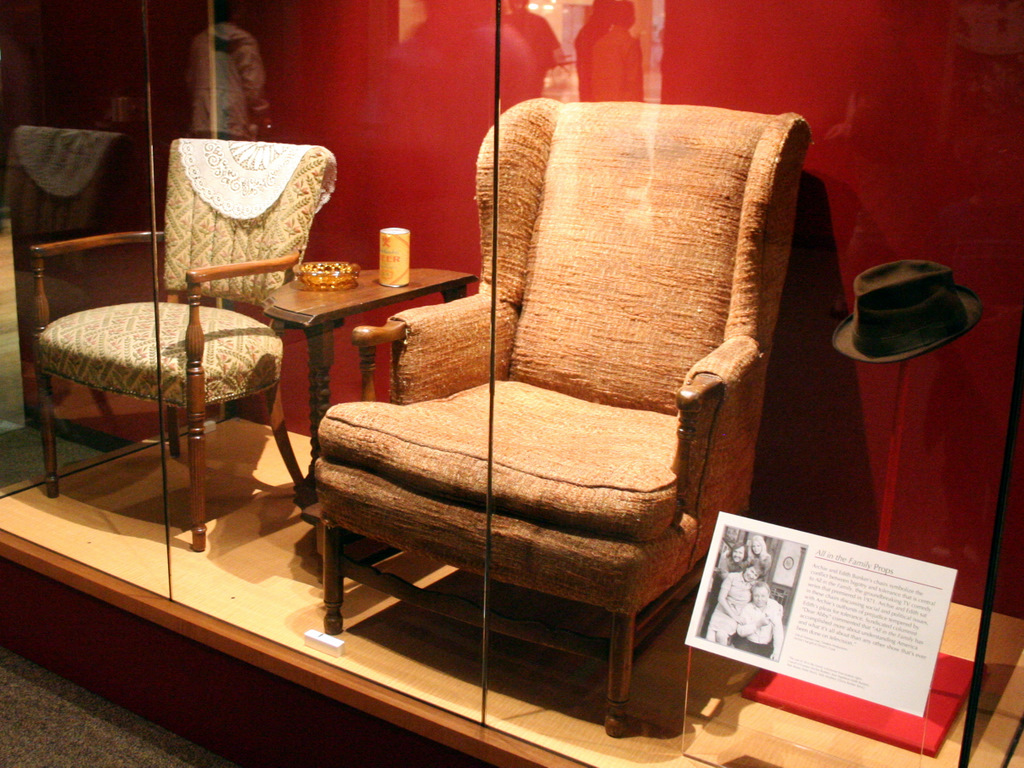
Archie and Edith Bunker's chairs on display in the Smithsonian National Museum of American History

As one of American television's most acclaimed and groundbreaking programs, All in the Family has been referenced or parodied in countless other forms of media. References on other sitcoms include That '70s Show, The Simpsons, and Family Guy.

Popular T-shirts, buttons, and bumper stickers showing O'Connor's image and farcically promoting "Archie Bunker for President" appeared around the time of the 1972 presidential election. In 1998, All in the Family was honored on a 33-cent stamp by the USPS.

Archie and Edith Bunker's chairs are on display in the Smithsonian National Museum of American History. The originals had been purchased by the show's set designer for a few dollars at a local Goodwill thrift store and were given to the Smithsonian (for an exhibit on American television history) in 1978. It cost producers thousands of dollars to create replicas to replace the originals.

Then-US President Richard Nixon can be heard discussing the show (specifically the 1971 episodes "Writing the President" and "Judging Books by Covers") on one of the infamous Watergate tapes.

Rapper Redman has made references to Archie Bunker in a few of his songs, specifically his smoking of large cigars.

Mad parodied the series in its 1973 special issue No. 11 entitled "Gall in the Family Fare", which also included a free flexi-disc record so the reader could listen to the parody as they read it.

== Accolades ==
=== Directors Guild of America Awards ===
Year	Category	Nominee(s)	Result	Ref.
1971	Outstanding Directorial Achievement in Comedy Series	John Rich (for "Meet the Bunkers")	Won	
1972	Outstanding Directorial Achievement in Comedy Series	John Rich and Bob LaHendro (for "The Bunkers and the Swingers")	Nominated	
1977	Outstanding Directorial Achievement in Comedy Series	Paul Bogart (for "Edith's 50th Birthday")	Won	
1978	Outstanding Directorial Achievement in Comedy Series	Paul Bogart (for "California, Here We Are")	Won	
1979	Outstanding Directorial Achievement in Comedy Series	Paul Bogart (for "Too Good Edith")	Nominated	

=== Golden Globe Awards ===
Year	Category	Nominee(s)	Result	Ref.
1971	Best Television Series – Musical or Comedy		Won	
1971	Best Actor in a Television Series – Musical or Comedy	Carroll O'Connor	Won	
1971	Best Actress in a Television Series – Musical or Comedy	Jean Stapleton	Nominated	
1971	Best Supporting Actor – Television	Rob Reiner	Nominated	
1971	Best Supporting Actress – Television	Sally Struthers	Nominated	
1972	Best Television Series – Musical or Comedy		Won	
1972	Best Actor in a Television Series – Musical or Comedy	Carroll O'Connor	Nominated	
1972	Best Actress in a Television Series – Musical or Comedy	Jean Stapleton	Won	
1972	Best Supporting Actor – Television	Rob Reiner	Nominated	
1972	Best Supporting Actress – Television	Sally Struthers	Nominated	
1973	Best Television Series – Musical or Comedy		Won	
1973	Best Actor in a Television Series – Musical or Comedy	Carroll O'Connor	Nominated	
1973	Best Actress in a Television Series – Musical or Comedy	Jean Stapleton	Won (Note: Tied with Cher for The Sonny & Cher Comedy Hour.)	
1973	Best Supporting Actor – Television	Rob Reiner	Nominated	
1973	Best Supporting Actress – Television	Sally Struthers	Nominated	
1974	Best Television Series – Musical or Comedy		Nominated	
1974	Best Actor in a Television Series – Musical or Comedy	Carroll O'Connor	Nominated	
1974	Best Actress in a Television Series – Musical or Comedy	Jean Stapleton	Nominated	
1974	Best Supporting Actress – Television	Betty Garrett	Won	
1975	Best Television Series – Musical or Comedy		Nominated	
1975	Best Actor in a Television Series – Musical or Comedy	Carroll O'Connor	Nominated	
1975	Best Supporting Actor – Television	Rob Reiner	Nominated	
1976	Best Supporting Actor – Television	Rob Reiner	Nominated	
1976	Best Supporting Actress – Television	Sally Struthers	Nominated	
1977	Best Television Series – Musical or Comedy		Won	
1977	Best Actor in a Television Series – Musical or Comedy	Carroll O'Connor	Nominated	
1977	Best Actress in a Television Series – Musical or Comedy	Jean Stapleton	Nominated	
1978	Best Television Series – Musical or Comedy		Nominated	
1978	Best Actress in a Television Series – Musical or Comedy	Jean Stapleton	Nominated	
1979	Best Actress in a Television Series – Musical or Comedy	Jean Stapleton	Nominated	

=== Humanitas Prize ===
Year	Category	Nominee(s)	Result	Ref.
1977	30 Minute Network or Syndicated Television	Mel Tolkin and Larry Rhine (for "Archie's Brief Encounter: Part 2")	Nominated	
1978	30 Minute Network or Syndicated Television	Larry Rhine and Mel Tolkin (for "The Brother")	Won	
1979	30 Minute Network or Syndicated Television	Harriett Weiss, Patt Shea, and Mort Lachman (for "Edith Gets Fired")	Nominated	

=== Online Film and Television Association Awards ===
Year	Category	Nominee(s)	Result	Ref.
1997	Television Hall of Fame: Productions	All in the Family	Inducted	
2021	Television Hall of Fame: Characters	Archie Bunker	Inducted	
2021	Television Hall of Fame: Characters	Edith Bunker	Inducted	
2021	Television Hall of Fame: Theme Songs	"Those Were the Days" – Charles Strouse and Lee Adams	Inducted	
2023	Television Hall of Fame: Episodes	"Meet the Bunkers"	Inducted	
2023	Television Hall of Fame: Episodes	"Sammy's Visit"	Inducted	

=== Primetime Emmy Awards (Note: All in the Family became the first sitcom to win Primetime Emmy Awards for all four of the lead actors (Carroll O'Connor, Jean Stapleton, Sally Struthers, and Rob Reiner). The other three sitcoms to make this achievement are The Golden Girls, Will & Grace, and Schitt's Creek.) ===
Year	Category	Nominee(s)	Result	Ref.
1971	Outstanding Comedy Series	Norman Lear	Won	
1971	Outstanding New Series	Norman Lear	Won	
1971	Outstanding Lead Actor in a Comedy Series	Carroll O'Connor	Nominated	
1971	Outstanding Lead Actress in a Comedy Series	Jean Stapleton	Won	
1971	Outstanding Directing for a Comedy Series	John Rich (for "Gloria's Pregnancy")	Nominated	
1971	Outstanding Writing for a Comedy Series	Norman Lear (for "Meet the Bunkers")	Nominated	
1971	Outstanding Writing for a Comedy Series	Stanley Ralph Ross (for "Oh, My Aching Back")	Nominated	
1972	Outstanding Comedy Series	Norman Lear	Won	
1972	Outstanding Program of the Year	Norman Lear (for "Sammy's Visit")	Nominated	
1972	Outstanding Lead Actor in a Comedy Series	Carroll O'Connor	Won	
1972	Outstanding Lead Actress in a Comedy Series	Jean Stapleton	Won	
1972	Outstanding Supporting Actor in a Comedy Series	Rob Reiner	Nominated	
1972	Outstanding Supporting Actress in a Comedy Series	Sally Struthers	Won (Note: Tied with Valerie Harper for The Mary Tyler Moore Show.)	
1972	Outstanding Directing for a Comedy Series	John Rich (for "Sammy's Visit")	Won	
1972	Outstanding Writing for a Comedy Series	Norman Lear and Burt Styler (for "The Saga of Cousin Oscar")	Nominated	
1972	Outstanding Writing for a Comedy Series	Alan J. Levitt and Philip Mishkin (for "Mike's Problem")	Nominated	
1972	Outstanding Writing for a Comedy Series	Burt Styler (for "Edith's Problem")	Won	
1972	Outstanding Achievement in Live or Tape Sound Mixing	Norman Dewes (for "The Elevator Story")	Won	
1973	Outstanding Comedy Series	Norman Lear and John Rich	Won	
1973	Outstanding Lead Actor in a Comedy Series	Carroll O'Connor	Nominated	
1973	Outstanding Lead Actress in a Comedy Series	Jean Stapleton	Nominated	
1973	Outstanding Supporting Actor in a Comedy Series	Rob Reiner	Nominated	
1973	Outstanding Supporting Actress in a Comedy Series	Sally Struthers	Nominated	
1973	Outstanding Directing for a Comedy Series	John Rich and Bob LaHendro (for "The Bunkers and the Swingers")	Nominated	
1973	Outstanding Writing for a Comedy Series	Michael Ross, Bernard West, and Lee Kalcheim (for "The Bunkers and the Swingers")	Won	
1974	Outstanding Comedy Series	Norman Lear and John Rich	Nominated	
1974	Outstanding Lead Actor in a Comedy Series	Carroll O'Connor	Nominated	
1974	Best Lead Actress in a Comedy Series	Jean Stapleton	Nominated	
1974	Outstanding Supporting Actor in a Comedy	Rob Reiner (for "The Games Bunkers Play")	Won	
1974	Outstanding Supporting Actress in a Comedy	Sally Struthers	Nominated	
1975	Outstanding Comedy Series	Don Nicholl, Michael Ross, and Bernard West	Nominated	
1975	Outstanding Lead Actor in a Comedy Series	Carroll O'Connor	Nominated	
1975	Outstanding Lead Actress in a Comedy Series	Jean Stapleton	Nominated	
1975	Outstanding Supporting Actor in a Comedy Series	Rob Reiner	Nominated	
1976	Outstanding Comedy Series	Hal Kanter, Norman Lear, Heywood Kling, Lou Derman, and Bill Davenport	Nominated	
1977	Outstanding Comedy Series	Mort Lachman and Milt Josefsberg	Nominated	
1977	Outstanding Lead Actor in a Comedy Series	Carroll O'Connor	Won	
1977	Outstanding Lead Actress in a Comedy Series	Jean Stapleton	Nominated	
1977	Outstanding Directing for a Comedy Series	Paul Bogart (for "The Draft Dodger")	Nominated	
1977	Outstanding Art Direction for a Single-Camera Series	Don Roberts (for "The Unemployment Story: Part 2")	Nominated	
1978	Outstanding Comedy Series	Mort Lachman and Milt Josefsberg	Won	
1978	Outstanding Lead Actor in a Comedy Series	Carroll O'Connor	Won	
1978	Outstanding Lead Actress in a Comedy Series	Jean Stapleton (for "Edith's 50th Birthday")	Won	
1978	Outstanding Continuing Performance by a Supporting Actor in a Comedy Series	Rob Reiner	Won	
1978	Outstanding Supporting Actress in a Comedy Series	Sally Struthers	Nominated	
1978	Outstanding Directing in a Comedy Series	Paul Bogart (for "Edith's 50th Birthday")	Won	
1978	Outstanding Writing for a Comedy Series	Bob Weiskopf, Bob Schiller, Barry Harman, and Harve Brosten (for "Cousin Liz")	Won	
1978	Outstanding Writing for a Comedy Series	Bob Weiskopf and Bob Schiller (for "Edith's 50th Birthday: Part 1")	Nominated	
1978	Outstanding Writing for a Comedy Series	Mel Tolkin, Larry Rhine, and Erik Tarloff (for "Edith's Crisis of Faith: Part 2")	Nominated	
1979	Outstanding Comedy Series	Mort Lachman and Milt Josefsberg	Nominated	
1979	Outstanding Lead Actor in a Comedy Series	Carroll O'Connor	Won	
1979	Outstanding Lead Actress in a Comedy Series	Jean Stapleton	Nominated	
1979	Outstanding Supporting Actress in a Comedy Series	Sally Struthers (for "California, Here We Are")	Won	
1979	Outstanding Directing for a Comedy Series	Paul Bogart (for "California, Here We Are: Part 2")	Nominated	
1979	Outstanding Writing for a Comedy Series	Milt Josefsberg, Phil Sharp, Bob Schiller, and Bob Weiskopf (for "California, Here We Are: Part 2")	Nominated	
1979	Outstanding Picture Editing for a Multi-Camera Comedy Series	Hal Collins and Harvey Berger (for "The 200th Episode Celebration of All in the Family")	Nominated	

=== Television Critics Association Awards ===
Year	Category	Nominee(s)	Result	Ref.
2011	Heritage Award	All in the Family	Nominated	
2013	Heritage Award	All in the Family	Won	

=== Writers Guild of America Awards ===
Year	Category	Nominee(s)	Result	Ref.
1971	Episodic Comedy	Stanley Ralph Ross (for "Archie's Aching Back")	Nominated	
1971	Episodic Comedy	Don Nicholl (for "Christmas Day at the Bunkers")	Nominated	
1971	Episodic Comedy	Michael Ross, Bernard West, Alfred Lewis Levitt, and Helen Levitt (for "Edith's Accident")	Nominated	
1971	Episodic Comedy	Jerry Mayer (for "Gloria Has a Belly Full")	Nominated	
1971	Episodic Comedy	Alan J. Levitt and Phil Mishkin (for "Mike's Problem")	Nominated	
1972	Episodic Comedy	Burt Styler and Steve Zacharias (for "Edith's Problem")	Nominated	
1975	Episodic Comedy	Lou Derman and Bill Davenport (for "Archie the Hero")	Nominated	
1976	Episodic Comedy	Mel Tolkin, Larry Rhine, and Milt Josefsberg (for "Joey's Baptism")	Nominated	
1977	Episodic Comedy	Larry Rhine and Mel Tolkin (for "Archie Gets the Business")	Won	
1977	Episodic Comedy	Erik Tarloff (for "The Joys of Sex")	Nominated	
1978	Episodic Comedy	Milt Josefsberg, Phil Sharp, Bob Schiller, and Bob Weiskopf (for "California, Here We Are")	Nominated	

=== Young Artist Awards ===
Year	Category	Nominee(s)	Result	Ref.
1979	Best Juvenile Actress in a TV Series or Special	Danielle Brisebois	Nominated	

== See also ==
- All in a Family
- List of American television shows based on foreign shows
- List of All in the Family episodes
