= Sitcoms in the United States =

Broadcast genre; recurring cast comedy

Situation comedies, or sitcoms, have long been a popular genre of comedy in the US, initially on radio in the 1920s, and then on television beginning in the 1940s. A sitcom is defined as a television series featuring a recurring cast of characters in various successive comedic situations.

The first sitcom was the radio show Sam 'n' Henry, which had evolved into Amos 'n' Andy by 1928. Mary Kay and Johnny, the first American TV sitcom, premiered in 1947, and by the 1950s, I Love Lucy was leading TV viewership. Since that time, sitcoms such as The Beverly Hillbillies, Bewitched, All in the Family, Cheers, The Cosby Show, Seinfeld, and Friends have each been the highest annual rated TV series in the US for at least one season.

== Radio ==
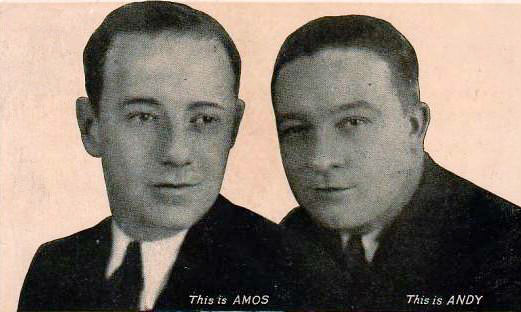
Freeman Gosden and Charles Correll of Amos 'n' Andy in 1929

The sitcom format was born in January 1926 with the initial broadcast of Sam 'n' Henry on WGN radio in Chicago, Illinois. The 15-minute daily program was revamped in 1928, moved to another station, renamed Amos 'n' Andy, and became one of the most successful sitcoms of the period. It was also one of the earliest examples of radio syndication. Like many radio programs of the time, the two programs continued the American entertainment traditions of vaudeville and the minstrel show. Early sitcoms took the forms of recurring comedy sketches with running characters, which on national network shows often took the form of a broader variety show with vocal and instrumental music performances padding out a half-hour time slot.

The Jack Benny Program, a radio-TV comedy series that ran for more than three decades, is generally regarded as a high-water mark in 20th-century American comedy.

Fibber McGee and Molly was one of radio's most popular sitcoms of the 1940s. The weekly half-hour domestic sitcom starring real-life husband and wife Jim Jordan and Marian Driscoll ran from 1935 to 1956 on NBC.

== Television ==
=== 1940s ===
Mary Kay and Johnny, aired from 1947 to 1950, was the first sitcom broadcast on network television in the United States and was the first program to show a couple sharing a bed, and the first series to show a woman's pregnancy on television. The Goldbergs ran for six seasons on CBS and NBC from 1949 to 1954 before airing on sydication.

=== 1950s ===
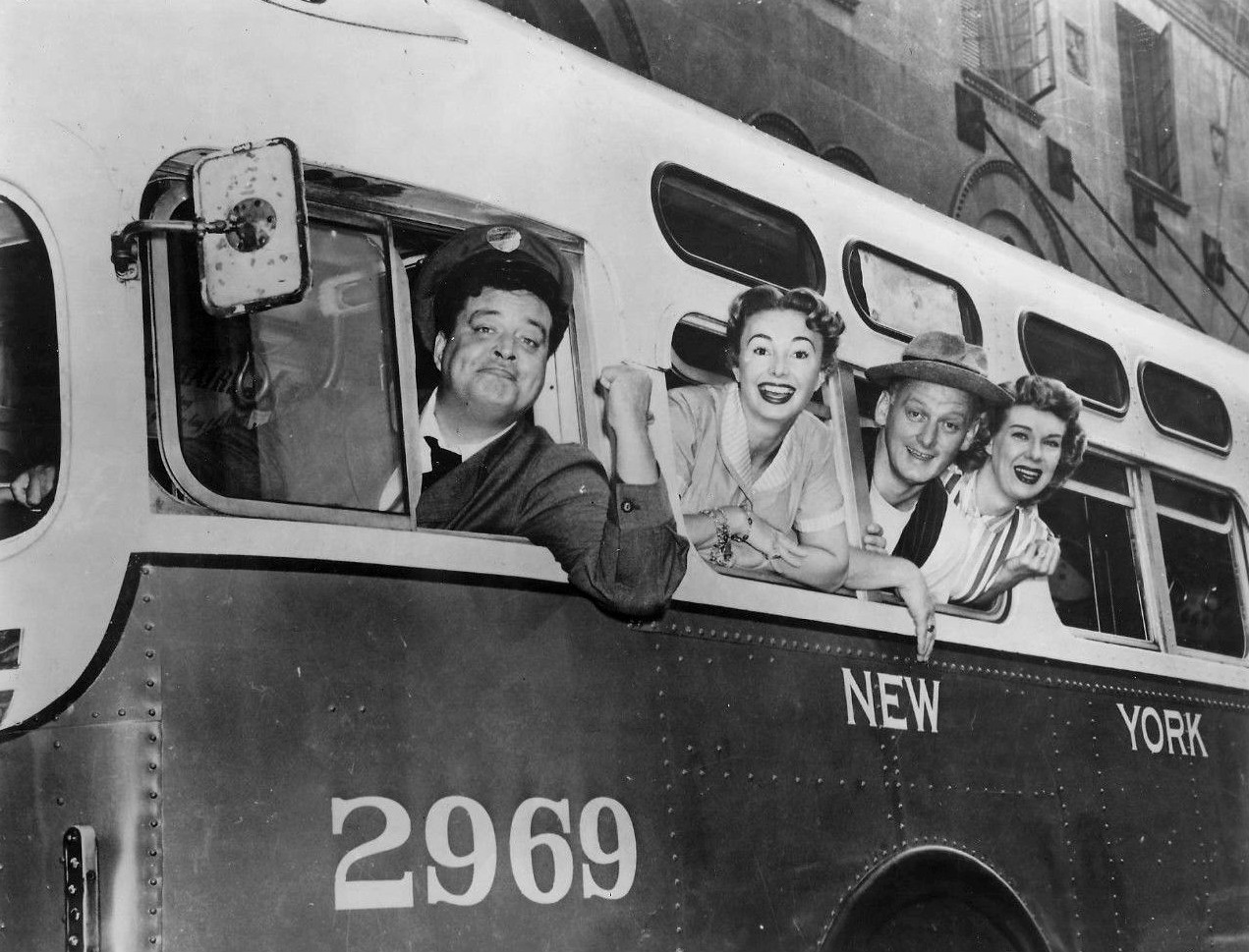
The main cast of The Honeymooners in 1955

I Love Lucy, which originally ran from 1951 to 1957 on CBS, was the most watched show in the United States in four of its six seasons, and was the first to end its run at the top of the Nielsen ratings (an accomplishment later matched only by The Andy Griffith Show in 1968 and Seinfeld in 1998). The show is still syndicated in dozens of languages across the world, and remains popular with an American audience of 40 million each year. Colourised edits of episodes from the original series have aired semi-annually on the network since 2013, six decades after the series aired. It is often regarded as one of the greatest and most influential sitcoms in history. In 2012, it was voted the 'Best TV Show of All Time' in a survey conducted by ABC News and People Magazine.

The Honeymooners debuted as a half-hour series on 1955 and was originally aired on the DuMont network's Cavalcade of Stars and subsequently on the CBS network's The Jackie Gleason Show, which was filmed in front of a live audience. Although initially a ratings success—becoming the No. 2 show in the United States during its first season—it faced stiff competition from The Perry Como Show, and eventually dropped to No. 19, ending its production after only 39 episodes (now referred to as the "Classic 39"). The final episode of The Honeymooners aired on September 22, 1956. Creator/producer Jackie Gleason revived The Honeymooners sporadically until 1978. The Honeymooners was one of the first U.S. television shows to portray working class married couples in a gritty, non-idyllic manner (the show is set mostly in the Kramdens' kitchen, in a neglected Brooklyn apartment building). Steven Sheehan explains the popularity of The Honeymooners as the embodiment of working-class masculinity in the character of Ralph Kramden, and postwar ideals in American society regarding work, housing, consumerism, and consumer satisfaction. The series demonstrated visually the burdens of material obligations and participation in consumer culture, as well as the common use of threats of domestic violence in working class households. Art Carney won five Emmy Awards for his portrayal of Ed Norton — two for the original Jackie Gleason Show, one for The Honeymooners, and two for the final version of The Jackie Gleason Show. He was nominated for another two (1957, 1966) but lost. Gleason and Audrey Meadows were both nominated in 1956 for their work on The Honeymooners. Meadows was also nominated for Emmys for her portrayal of Alice Kramden in 1954 and 1957. In 1997, the episodes "The $99,000 Answer" and "TV or Not TV" were respectively ranked No. 6 and No. 26 on "TV Guide's 100 Greatest Episodes of All Time" and in 1999, TV Guide published a list titled "TV's 100 Greatest Characters Ever!" Ed Norton was No. 20, and Ralph Kramden was No. 2. In 2002, The Honeymooners was listed at No. 3 on TV Guide's 50 Greatest TV Shows of All Time and No. 13 on their list of the "60 Greatest Shows of All Time" in 2013.

=== 1960s ===
The Andy Griffith Show, first televised on CBS between 1960 and 1968, was consistently placed in the top ten during its run. The show is one of only three shows to have its final season be the number one ranked show on television, the other two being I Love Lucy and Seinfeld. In 1998, more than 5 million people a day watched the show's re-runs on 120 stations.

The Dick Van Dyke Show, initially aired on CBS from 1961 to 1966, won 15 Emmy Awards. In 1997, the episodes "Coast-to-Coast Big Mouth" and "It May Look Like a Walnut" were ranked at 8 and 15 respectively on TV Guide's 100 Greatest Episodes of All Time. In 2002, it was ranked at 13 on TV Guide's 50 Greatest TV Shows of All Time and in 2013, it was ranked at 20 on their list of the 60 Best Series.

=== 1970s ===
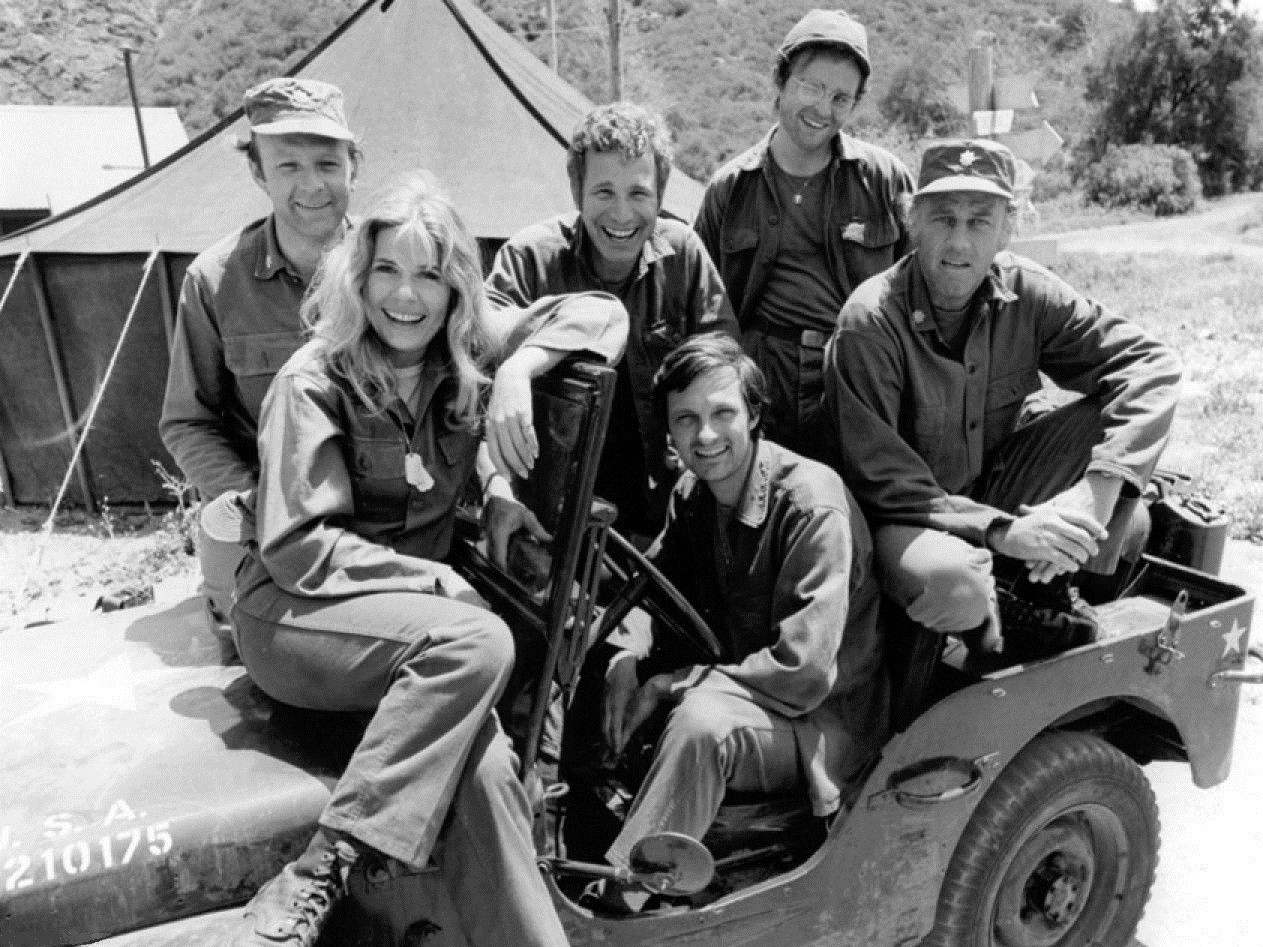
The main cast of M*A*S*H in 1974

The Mary Tyler Moore Show ran from 1970 to 1977, winning 29 Emmy Awards. MTM Enterprises, the studio formed to produce it, would produce dozens of sitcoms from the 1970s through the 1990s.

The series M*A*S*H, aired in the U.S. from 1972 to 1983, and was honoured with a Peabody Award in 1976 and was ranked number 25 on TV Guide's 50 Greatest TV Shows of All Time in 2002. In 2013, the Writers Guild of America ranked it as the fifth-best written TV series ever and TV Guide ranked it as the eighth-greatest show of all time. The episodes "Abyssinia, Henry" and "The Interview" were ranked number 20 and number 80, respectively, on TV Guide's 100 Greatest Episodes of All Time in 1997. And the finale, "Goodbye, Farewell and Amen", became the most-watched and highest-rated single television episode in the U.S. television history at the time, with a record-breaking of 125 million viewers (60.2 rating and 77 share), according to The New York Times.

Sanford and Son, which ran from 1972 to 1977, was included on the Time magazine's list of the "100 Best TV Shows of All Time" in 2007.

All in the Family, premiered in January 1971, is often regarded in the United States as one of the greatest television series of all time. Following a lackluster first season, the show became the most watched show in the United States during summer re-runs and afterwards ranked number one in the yearly Nielsen ratings from 1971 to 1976. It became the first television series to reach the milestone of having topped the Nielsen ratings for five consecutive years. The episode "Sammy's Visit" was ranked number 13 on TV Guide's 100 Greatest Episodes of All Time. TV Guide's 50 Greatest TV Shows of All Time ranked All in the Family as number four. Bravo also named the show's protagonist, Archie Bunker, TV's greatest character of all time. In 2013, the Writers Guild of America ranked All in the Family the fourth-best written TV series ever, and TV Guide ranked it as the fourth-greatest show of all time.

One Day at a Time is a situation comedy developed by Norman Lear. The show aired on CBS and ran from December, 1975 until May, 1984. It followed a recently divorced mother and her two daughters as they dealt with the problems and situations that come with growing up, and raising kids in a single parent household. It is the first show to feature Valerie Bertinelli, and emphasized her character as the show progressed.

=== 1980s ===
Cheers, which ran for eleven seasons, was one of the most successful sitcoms in the 80s, airing from 1982 to 1993. It was followed by a spin-off sitcom in the 90s, Frasier. During its run, Cheers became one of the most popular series of all time and has received critical acclaim. In 1997, the episodes "Thanksgiving Orphans" and "Home Is the Sailor", aired originally in 1987, were respectively ranked No. 7 and No. 45 on TV Guide's 100 Greatest Episodes of All-Time. In 2002, Cheers was ranked No. 18 on TV Guide's 50 Greatest TV Shows of All Time. In 2013, the Writers Guild of America ranked it as the eighth best written TV series and TV Guide ranked it No. 11 on their list of the 60 Greatest Shows of All Time.

The Cosby Show, airing from 1984 until 1992, spent five consecutive seasons as the number one rated show on television. The Cosby Show and All in the Family are the only sitcoms in the history of the Nielsen ratings to be the number one show for five seasons. It spent all eight of its seasons in the Top 20. According to TV Guide, the show "was TV's biggest hit in the 1980s, and almost single handedly revived the sitcom genre and NBC's ratings fortunes." TV Guide also ranked it 28th on their list of 50 Greatest Shows. In addition, Cliff Huxtable was named as the "Greatest Television Dad". In May 1992, Entertainment Weekly stated that The Cosby Show helped to make possible a larger variety of sitcoms with a predominantly African-American cast, such as its direct spin-off A Different World, and from another studio The Fresh Prince of Bel-Air.

Mama's Family originally aired on NBC, debuting on January 22, 1983. After two seasons, the show was canceled in 1984 and subsequently revived for an additional four seasons in September 1986 until February 1990.

The Golden Girls originally aired on NBC from September 14, 1985, to May 9, 1992, with a total of 180 half-hour episodes, spanning seven seasons. The show received critical acclaim throughout most of its run, and won several awards, including the Primetime Emmy Award for Outstanding Comedy Series twice. It also won three Golden Globe Awards for Best Television Series – Musical or Comedy.

Another popular sitcom from this decade was Roseanne, which ran from 1988 to 1997.

=== 1990s ===
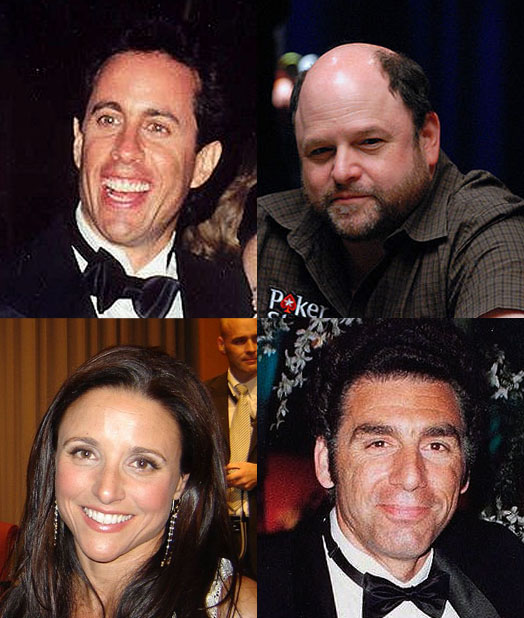
The main cast of Seinfeld, which aired from 1989 to 1998 on NBC

Seinfeld, which originally ran for nine seasons on NBC from 1989 to 1998, led the Nielsen ratings in seasons six and nine, and finished among the top two (with NBC's ER) every year from 1994 to 1998. In 2002, TV Guide named Seinfeld the greatest television program of all time. In 1997, the episodes "The Boyfriend" and "The Parking Garage" were respectively ranked numbers 4 and 33 on TV Guide's 100 Greatest Episodes of All Time, and in 2009, "The Contest" was ranked No. 1 on the same magazine's list of TV's Top 100 Episodes of All Time. E! named it the "number 1 reason the '90s ruled." In 2013, the Writers Guild of America named Seinfeld the No. 2 Best Written TV Series of All Time (second to The Sopranos). That same year, Entertainment Weekly named it the No. 3 best TV series of all time and TV Guide ranked it at No. 2.

The Fresh Prince of Bel-Air was a sitcom which ran from 1990 to 1996. The series stars Will Smith as a fictionalized version of himself, a street-smart teenager from West Philadelphia who is sent to move in with his wealthy aunt and uncle in their Bel Air mansion after getting into a fight on a local basketball court. It became one of the popular sitcoms during the 1990s, despite only one Emmy nomination and moderately positive critical reception.

Friends, which originally aired on NBC from 1994 to 2004, received acclaim throughout its run, becoming one of the most popular television shows of all time. The series was nominated for 62 Primetime Emmy Awards, winning the Outstanding Comedy Series award in 2002 for its eighth season. The show ranked no. 21 on TV Guide's 50 Greatest TV Shows of All Time and no. 5 on Empire magazine's The 50 Greatest TV Shows of All Time. In 1997, the episode "The One with the Prom Video" was ranked no. 100 on TV Guide's 100 Greatest Episodes of All-Time. In 2013, Friends ranked no. 24 on the Writers Guild of America's 101 Best Written TV Series of All Time and no. 28 on TV Guide's 60 Best TV Series of All Time. In 2014, the series was ranked by Mundo Estranho the Best TV Series of All Time.

Frasier, with five wins in its first five seasons, set the record for most consecutive Emmy awards for Outstanding Comedy Series, a record that has since been matched by Modern Family. The series holds the record for most total Emmy wins, 37, shattering the record of 29 which had been set by The Mary Tyler Moore Show. Frasier is considered the most successful spin-off series in television history, beginning its run one season after Cheers went off the air, where the character of Frasier Crane had been appearing for nine years. Frasier ran from 1993 to 2004.

=== 2000s ===
In early 2000s, Curb Your Enthusiasm premiered on HBO. The series was created by Larry David, who stars as a semi-fictionalized version of himself following his life after the end of his work in Seinfeld. Curb Your Enthusiasm has received high critical acclaim and has grown in popularity since its debut. It has been nominated for 51 Primetime Emmy Awards and won twice. Robert B. Weide received an Emmy for Outstanding Directing for a Comedy Series for the episode "Krazee Eyez Killa". The show won the 2002 Golden Globe Award for Best Television Series – Musical or Comedy.

Two and a Half Men is a sitcom that originally aired on CBS for twelve seasons from 22 September 2003 to 19 February 2015. The success of the series led to it being the fourth-highest revenue-generating program for 2012, earning $3.24 million an episode.

Arrested Development is a sitcom created by Mitchell Hurwitz, which originally aired on Fox for three seasons from 2 November 2003 to 10 February 2006. A fourth season of 15 episodes was released on Netflix on 26 May 2013. After its debut in 2003, Arrested Development gained a cult following and received widespread critical acclaim, six Primetime Emmy Awards, and one Golden Globe Award. In 2007, Time listed the show among its "All-TIME 100 TV Shows"; in 2008, it was ranked 16th on Entertainment Weekly's "New TV Classics" list. In 2011, IGN named Arrested Development the "funniest show of all time". Its humour has been cited as a key influence on later single-camera sitcoms such as 30 Rock and Community.

The Office is a sitcom that aired on NBC from 24 March 2005 to 16 May 2013. It is an adaptation of the BBC series of the same name. The first season of The Office was met with mixed reviews, but the following four seasons received widespread acclaim from television critics. These seasons were included on several critics' year-end top TV series lists, winning several awards including four Primetime Emmy Awards, including Outstanding Comedy Series in 2006. While later seasons were criticized for a decline in quality, earlier writers oversaw the final season and ended the show's run with a positive reception.

It's Always Sunny in Philadelphia is a sitcom which began airing in 2005 on FX. It was created by Rob McElhenney, who stars in the show alongside Charlie Day, Glenn Howerton, Kaitlin Olson and Danny DeVito. The show has garnered critical acclaim and a cult following for its dark humor and performances. In 2020, it was renewed for its fifteenth series making it the longest running live-action American sitcom of all time.

How I Met Your Mother is a sitcom which aired from 2005 to 2014 on CBS, lasting 9 series. The show won 9 Emmy awards and 18 awards in general, whilst being nominated for 72 awards. It became successful in many places across the world.

The Big Bang Theory is a sitcom named after the scientific theory. It began airing in 2007 on CBS and completed season 12, its final season, in 2019. The show was set in Pasadena, California and focused on five main characters (later on others get promoted to starring roles), Leonard Hofstadter (experimental physicist) and Sheldon Cooper (theoretical physicist) who live across the hall from aspiring actress Penny. Leonard and Sheldon are friends with Howard Wolowitz (aerospace engineer) and Raj Koothrappali (astrophysicist). Later additions include Bernadette Rostenkowski (microbiologist), Amy Farrah Fowler (neurobiologist), Stuart Bloom (comic-book store owner) and Emily Sweeney (dermatologist). Season 7 had 19.96 million viewers, the highest rated and watched series to date.

30 Rock is a satirical sitcom created by Tina Fey that ran on NBC from 11 October 2006, to 31 January 2013. 30 Rock received critical acclaim throughout its run, winning several major awards (including Primetime Emmy Awards for Outstanding Comedy Series in 2007, 2008, and 2009 and nominations for every other year it ran), and appearing on many critics' year-end "best of" 2006–2013 lists. On 14 July 2009, the series was nominated for 22 Primetime Emmy Awards, the most in a single year for a comedy series.

Modern Family is a mockumentary sitcom that aired ABC from 2009 to 2020. The series is presented in mockumentary style, with the fictional characters frequently talking directly into the camera. The show won the Emmy Award for Outstanding Comedy Series in each of its first five years and the Emmy Award for Outstanding Supporting Actor in a Comedy Series four times, twice for Eric Stonestreet and twice for Ty Burrell, as well as the Outstanding Supporting Actress in a Comedy Series twice for Julie Bowen. It has so far won a total of 22 Emmy awards from 75 nominations. It also won the Golden Globe Award for Best Television Series – Musical or Comedy in 2011.

Parks and Recreation, originally running from 2009 until 2015, was part of NBC's "Comedy Night Done Right" programming during its Thursday night prime-time block. The series received mixed reviews during its first season, but after re-working its tone and format, the second and subsequent seasons were widely acclaimed. Throughout its run, Parks and Recreation received several awards and nominations, including two Primetime Emmy Award nominations for Outstanding Comedy Series, six Emmy nominations, a Golden Globe win for Poehler's performance, and a nomination for the Golden Globe Award for Best Television Series – Musical or Comedy. In TIME's 2012 year-end lists issue, Parks and Recreation was named the number one television series of that year. In 2013, after receiving four consecutive nominations in the category, Parks and Recreation won the Television Critics Association Award for Outstanding Achievement in Comedy. It is widely considered one of the best sitcoms of all time.

Community ran on NBC from 2009 to 2014 for five seasons, and was picked up for a sixth season in 2015 on the now defunct, Yahoo! Screen. Created by Dan Harmon and starring Joel Mchale, Chevy Chase, Danny Pudi, Donald Glover, Yvette Nicole Brown, Gillian Jacobs, and Alison Brie, Community has gained a cult following, renowned for its level of commitment to homage and parody of popular movies, sitcoms, and genre tropes.

=== 2010s ===
Hot in Cleveland ran on TV Land from June 2010 to June 2015, for six seasons. It was TV Land's highest rated telecast in the cable network's 14-year history.

New Girl is a single-camera sitcom centered around a group of guy roommates adjusting to a new addition to their Los Angeles loft in the form of Jess, portrayed by Zooey Deschanel which premiered in 2011 on Fox. New Girl has received favorable responses from critics and was named one of the best new comedies of the 2011 fall season. The pilot episode drew 10.28 million U.S. viewers and a 4.8 adults 18–49 demo rating, making it the highest-rated fall debut for a Fox scripted show since 2001. The show has been nominated for several awards, including five Golden Globe Awards and five Primetime Emmy Awards.

Brooklyn Nine-Nine is a police sitcom set in the fictional 99th precinct in Brooklyn which premiered in 2013 on Fox. Although it was cancelled by Fox in 2018 after five seasons, NBC immediately picked it up for a sixth season on the following day. It has won two Creative Arts Emmy Awards, and two Golden Globe Awards: one for Best Television Series — Musical or Comedy and one for Andy Samberg for Best Actor — Television Series Musical or Comedy. Andre Braugher was also nominated for three consecutive Primetime Emmy Awards for his performance before his death in late 2023.

=== 2020s ===
Abbott Elementary, a workplace comedy about the staff of a predominantly black Philadelphia public school, debuted in 2021 on ABC. By its second season it was the network's most-watched comedy and received universal critical acclaim.

== See also ==
- Animated sitcom
- Black sitcom
- List of sitcoms
- Sitcom
