= Donald Roberts =

Donald or Don Roberts may refer to:

- Don Roberts (ice hockey) (1933–2016), American college men's ice hockey coach
- Don Roberts (politician), former Canadian politician
- Don Roberts (art director) (1934–1999), American television art director and production designer
- Donald F. Roberts (born 1939), Stanford communications professor emeritus
- Donald John Roberts (born 1945), Stanford economics professor and associate dean
- Donald Roberts (politician) (born 1948), member of the Montana Legislature
- Donald Roberts, judge of the Supreme Court of the Northern Territory
- Donald A. Roberts, mayor of Waterloo, Ontario
- Donald Van Norman Roberts (1928–2016), civil, geotechnical and environmental engineer
- Donald W. Roberts (born 1933), American insect pathologist
