= One World Family Commune =

Religious commune

- Abbreviation: OWFC
- Formation: 1967
- Founder: Allen Noonan
- Founded at: San Francisco
- Location: United States
- Origins: California

The One World Family Commune (OWFC) is a new age movement commune. It was formed in 1967 in San Francisco by 51 year old artist, café owner and UFO enthusiast Allen Noonan, aka Allen Michael, who opened the first vegetarian restaurant in the city, completely operated by the commune's members. The OWFC practices the teachings of the Everlasting Gospel, channeled by Allen Michael, a combination of UFO beliefs, themes of going beyond good and evil based on Christianity, expressed through use of one's life force in service, along with New Age beliefs like spirituality and higher states of being.

In 1973, OWFC was officially registered as The Universal Industrial Church of the New World Comforter (UIC). One of the primary goals of the OWF/UIC is expressed in The World Bill Of Rights written by its founder who by that time changed his name to Allen Michael. The commune was most active in Berkeley, California where it ran the One World Family Natural Foods and Entertainment Center, a restaurant, bakery, clothing store, pizzeria, and performance hall, while living in two large, former Greek system houses. During that time Noonan officially changed his name to Allen Michael. By 1975 the commune began decreasing in size, and relocated to Stockton, California. OWFC has been politically active throughout its existence, taking part in the anti-Vietnam War movement, promoting pacifism and rejection of capitalism. In late 1970's as an alternative to political parties the Synthesis Party was created to express universal world goals.

Noonan as Allen Michael declared his candidacy for President of the United States in 1980, 1984 as a write in candidate. In 1982 Allen Michael ran as a write-in candidate for Governor of California. Platform Statements by the Synthesis Party including The World Bill Of Rights and views on World Disarmament were submitted to the United Nations Second Special Session On Disarmament. In 1988, inspired by the Synthesis Party's 1985 proposed resolution for a UN World Peace Agreement and an outline for a Global Nuclear Arms Ban Treaty (GNABT), first written in 1984 by an OWFC member, a proposed GNABT was submitted to the UN Third Special Session on Disarmament by The One World Family Forum On Nuclear Disarmament. Noonan died in 2010 when he was 93. At that time there were four people in their 70s living together and maintaining the Galactic Messenger Network, a web site for the Everlasting Gospel.

== Allen Noonan ==
Allen Noonan, who was later known as Allen Michael, was born in Britt, Iowa on November 21, 1916. In his recollections he would say that as a child he received several angel visitations while playing alone. In high school he became a track runner and earned an athletic scholarship to Drake University which he attended for one year. He worked as a sign painter, and after being drafted for World War II he served as a conscientious objector in a camouflage battalion in Africa. After the war, he married his first wife Marian and moved to Long Beach, California where they lived with their three sons. In Long Beach he continued his work as a sign painter and in 1947 when he was thirty one years old, and just before Easter Noonan had a spiritual experience while painting a billboard. He described being enveloped by "ultraviolet light entwined with gold threads" and pulled into a spaceship, where he had a transcendental experience of being shown his entire life and made aware of spirits guiding humanity and of his own future role in that process.

Several months after the revelations, Noonan's wife divorced him. He then became involved in the UFO community, going to conferences and interacting with prominent Ufologists like George Van Tassel, George Adamski, and Gabriel Green. Noonan stated that his first personal contact with alien beings happened in 1954 near Giant Rock in Mojave Desert, when he had an ecstatic experience interacting with three beings that exited a landed spaceship. Soon after this experience, Noonan opened a cafe-art studio in Long Beach called House of Meditation. He wrote that while successful at first he felt that it eventually attracted problematic individuals. Guided by telepathic transmission from "God Mind," Noonan left for San Francisco in 1967. In 1969 he married Dian, a member of the commune, and together they had three children. The two later divorced, with Dian still remaining a member of the community.

== One World Family Commune ==
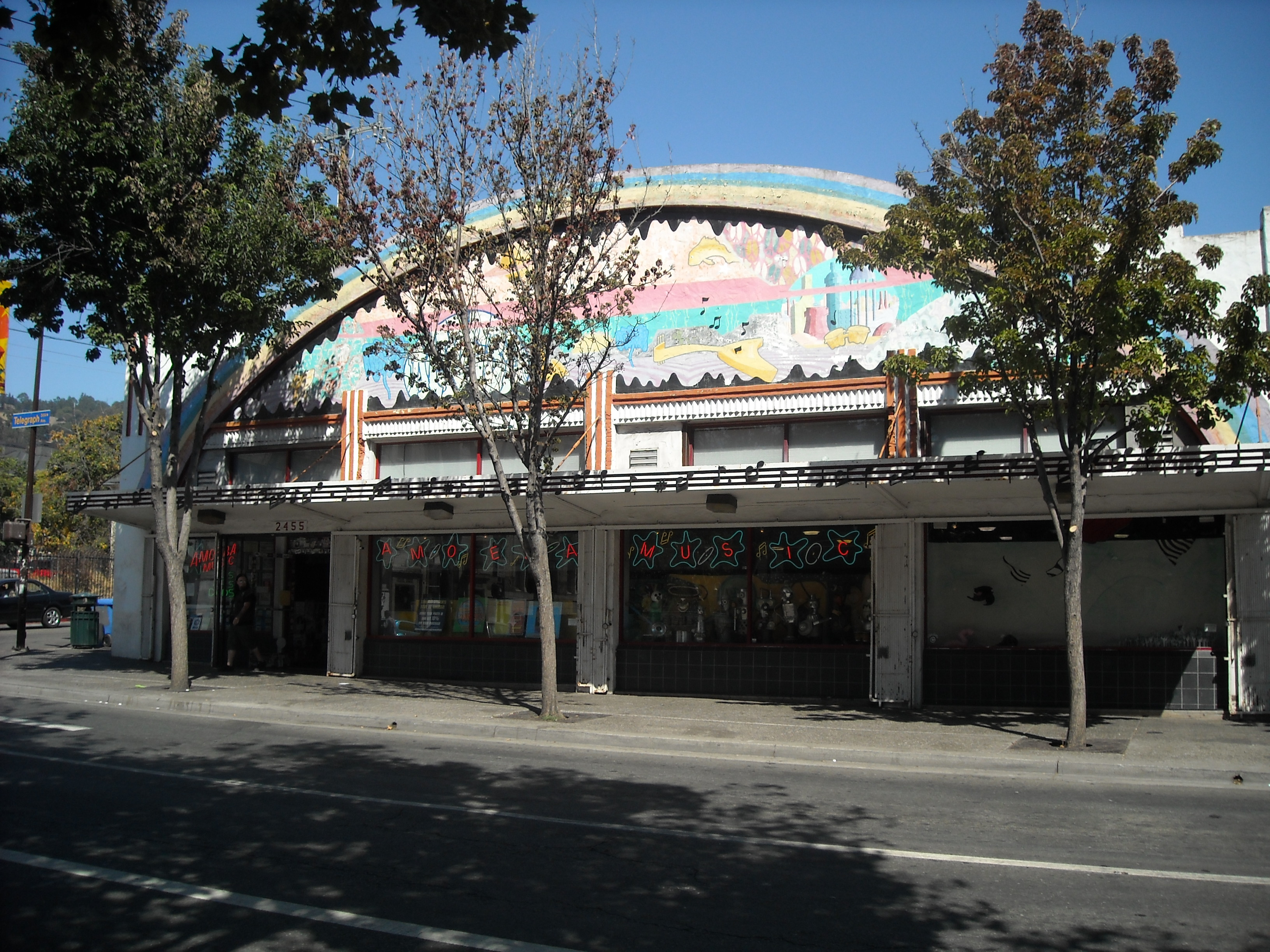
Amoeba Music formerly One World Family Natural Foods and Entertainment Center

At the age of 51, Noonan formed the One World Family Commune (OWFC), shortly after moving to San Francisco. It was composed of adherents to the channelings of the Everlasting Gospel; he would later register it as the Universal Industrial Church of the New World Comforter. Noonan preached that he was Allen Michael! the New World Comforter, channeling the plan of the God Mind or Universal Mind of ETI – Extra Territorial Intelligence "setting up the world environment into creative schools of experience, providing food, clothing, shelter, care, recreation and transportation for all of the people on the planet as one family." The OFWC, like other New Age and hippie communities, was largely composed of young people, motivated by rejection of capitalism, western religion, search for closer connection to nature through macrobiotic diet and psychedelics, embracement of communal living and non-monogamous relationships. At that time OWFC actively recruited members and attained national recognition when Chip Oliver, starting linebacker for the Oakland Raiders, joined the commune.

Soon after forming the commune, Noonan opened "Here and Now" in the Haight and Ashbury area of San Francisco, the first vegetarian restaurant in the city. In 1968, Noonan was arrested and served six months in jail for selling marijuana to an undercover officer posing as an astronomy teacher. The commune left San Francisco in 1969, opening Mustard Seed restaurants and communes in Marin County – Mill Valley and Larkspur; and the city of Berkeley across the San Francisco Bay. The following year, and due to the commune's association with the counterculture, the Mill Valley restaurant was evicted by its landlord, forcing the Larkspur commune to relocate and combine with OFWC branch in Berkeley. (Note: The Larkspur commune was also threatened eviction by the city due to its prohibition on five or more unrelated people living together.)

In 1970, the Berkeley's Mustard Seed restaurant was briefly closed, before reopening under a different name. One World Family Natural Foods and Entertainment Center was located in a large building on Telegraph Avenue and Haste Street in Southside part of Berkeley. (Note: In 1990 that building became the founding home of the renowned Amoeba Music record stores.) It also included a pizzeria, a "Far Outfits" airbrushed clothing store, bakery and a performance hall. In 1970, Noonan changed his last name to "Michael," telling that he was taken to the planet Altamira and assigned the duties of Archangel Michael.

At that time the popularity of University of California Greek Life was decreasing with many near-campus fraternities and sororities being unable maintain their leases, and were often replaced by student cooperatives and religious organizations. In 1970 the Berkeley branch rented the former residence of the Acacia fraternity on Piedmont Avenue. This was followed by another move, and by early 1973 the OWFC settled at 2405 and 2415 Prospect street houses, its final Berkeley location. The houses were named Novida and Altamira and in 1973 were home to 55 adults and 25 children. At one point the commune had over 100 members in the United States. With its embrace of the principle of "Holding all things in common" , all OWFC income was shared within the commune, no one drawing personal wages, with members performing daily 5 hour "love service" work shifts. At that time the commune experienced its most active period, welcoming new members, but did not prevent members from leaving.

In 1973 the commune was officially registered as a religious organization – The Universal Industrial Church of the New World Comforter. Two books – To the Youth of The World and a vegetarian cookbook – Cosmic Cookery, were published the same year. During this period the group began practicing Natural Selection, a tantric yoga group sexual activity. Participation was purely voluntary as a way for the adult members to express their sexuality and share in extended relationships if desired and agreed upon with one another. One of the members stated that: "We could see the benefit of going beyond the mortal-minded status quo programming in order to provide for one another the health benefits in exchanging hormones and energies in right sexing and the accompanying increased telepathic communication, while at the same time ridding ourselves of false programming of shame, guilt, jealousy and possessiveness."

In 1974 the commune opened a smaller version of the restaurant, including an air brushed t-shirt store on Maui, Hawaii. By 1975 the commune began decreasing in size and due to financial struggle and the sale of two houses to the Berkeley Student Cooperative by their landowner, the commune relocated to a twelve bedroom mansion in Stockton. That same year it released a music album – Quazar – One World Family – Extraterrestrial Music From ETI. (Note: Music has always been considered an important part of OWFC. Several bands were formed to both perform within the community as well tour and pass on their religious practices.)

By 1978 the group's size had decreased to twenty adults. Throughout its existence the commune has remained politically active, rejecting the growth of capitalism and promoting pacifism. In 1980 Allen Michael ran for President of the United States, campaigning on the cancellation of money debts and establishing a system were everything is free and shared by everyone. Over the years the group slowly decreased in size, moving to several locations before Allen Michael's death when he was 93 years old in 2010. At the time there were four people in their 60s living together and practicing their beliefs.

== Universal Industrial Church of the New World Comforter (UICNWC) ==
Like other UFO religions the Universal Industrial Church combines dissimilar themes with the key principles being "reincarnation, a concept called Uni-Communism, the Hegelian dialectic (Thesis, Anti-Thesis, and Synthesis), and extraterrestrial contact that will bring about the salvation of planet Earth." The dialectic is based on the Bible's Book of Revelation thesis, with the Synthesis being the Galactic Elohim of Galactica serving on behalf of God Mind, Universal Christ Consciousness, Extraterritorial Intelligence (ETI). Negative Energies created by Humanity's errors recorded in the Akashic Records acting as the Anti-Thesis.

The Galactic Elohim of Galactica are an extraterrestrial civilization, who created all life on earth and will eventually bring people of earth to a higher existence. On Earth the Galactic Elohim and God Mind are represented by Allen Michael, the Galactic Messenger and the New World Comforter. Negative Energies, the acquisition for oneself without regard to the whole, are channeled through such actions as the creation of the International Monetary Fund, the Federal Reserve System, the CIA, the Secret World Government, and general destructive tendencies toward 'Babylonian usury' (capitalistic economic exploitation based on lending money at high interest rates)." (Note: In describing their religion, UICNWC practitioners explain that in their teachings Zionism does not refer to Judaism or Jewish people, making a point that they embrace the unity and love for all people without exception and find it unfortunate that they are misunderstood.) According to OWFC/UICNWC members, the Synthesis will occur when this Humanity develops Higher Consciousness through Positive Affirmation of the God Force in Harmony with Nature as channeled through the Galactic Elohim, bringing all people into Galactic Membership on a higher plane of energy.

== Publications ==
Books

- Michael, Allen (1973). To The Youth Of The World. Starmast Publications.
- Michael, Allen (1977). ETI Space Beings Intercept Earthlings. Starmast Publications.
- Michael, Allen (1977). UFO-ETI World Master Plan. Starmast Publications.
- Michael, Allen (1982). GOD – Ultimate Unlimited Mind – Speaks. Starmast Publications.
- Michael, Allen (1994). Spirit God's Seven Churches. Starmast Publications.
- Michael, Allen (2001). Everlasting Gospel – The New World Bilbe. Starmast Publications.
- Michael, Allen (2002). Michael's Stand. Starmast Publications.
- Hannaford, Kathryn (1973). Cosmic Cookery. Starmast Publications.
- Antaree, Joseph (2015). The Great World Celebration. Starmast Publications.

Audio

- Quazar Electric Chorus – Extraterrestrial Music From ETI (LP Record). 1976.

== Bibliography ==
- Tumminia, Diana (2007). Alien Worlds: Social and Religious Dimensions of Extraterrestrial Contact. Syracuse University Press. ISBN 978-0-8156-0858-5.
- Get with the New Age Synthesis Party: Allen Michael, Candidate for the Presidency of the United States. Synthesis Party. 1979.
- Conroy, Ed (1990). Report on Communion. Avon Books. ISBN 978-0-380-70811-6.
- Streiker, Lowell D. (1990). New Age Comes to Main Street: What Worried Christians Must Know. Abingdon Press. ISBN 978-0-687-27715-5.
- Melton, J. Gordon; Group, Gale (2003). Encyclopedia of American Religions. Gale. ISBN 978-0-7876-6384-1.
- Page, Cecelia Frances (2009). The Future Age Beyond the New Age Movement. iUniverse. ISBN 978-1-4401-6585-6.
- Community, Fellowship for Intentional (2000). Communities Directory: A Guide to Intentional Communities and Cooperative Living. Fellowship for Intentional Community. ISBN 978-0-9602714-8-1.
