= List of American television shows based on foreign shows =

Many American television series are based, copied, or derived from television shows from other countries.

American show	Original show	Original country	Notes
All in the Family	Till Death Us Do Part	United Kingdom	
Amanda's; Payne	Fawlty Towers	United Kingdom	
America's Funniest Home Videos	Fun TV with Kato-chan and Ken-chan	Japan	
America's Most Wanted	Aktenzeichen XY… ungelöst	Germany	
American Idol	Pop Idol	United Kingdom	Ran 15 seasons on Fox before moving to ABC one year later.
American Ninja Challenge; American Ninja Warrior	Sasuke	Japan	
Antiques Roadshow (American TV program)	Antiques Roadshow	United Kingdom	
Being Human	Being Human	United Kingdom	
Big Bad Beetleborgs	Juukou B-Fighter; B-Fighter Kabuto	Japan	
Big Brother	Big Brother	Netherlands	
BrainSurge	Brain Survivor	Japan	
The Bridge	The Bridge	Denmark; Sweden	
Cash Cab	Cash Cab	United Kingdom	
Cardcaptors	Cardcaptor Sakura	Japan	
The Chase	The Chase	United Kingdom	
Celebrity Circus	Circus of the Celebrities	Portugal	
Celebrity Fit Club	Celebrity Fit Club	United Kingdom	
Containment	Cordon	Belgium	
Coupling (American TV series)	Coupling	United Kingdom	
Dance War: Bruno vs. Carrie Ann	DanceX	United Kingdom	
Dancing with the Stars	Strictly Come Dancing	United Kingdom	
Dangerous Women	Prisoner	Australia	
Deal or No Deal	Miljoenenjacht	Netherlands	
Dog Eat Dog	Dog Eat Dog	United Kingdom	
Dream School	Jamie's Dream School	United Kingdom	
Eleventh Hour	Eleventh Hour	United Kingdom	
Euphoria	Euphoria	Israel	
The Ex List	The Mythological X	Israel	
Eyewitness (American TV series)	Øyevitne	Norway	
Family Food Fight	Family Food Fight	Australia	
Farmer Wants a Wife	Farmer Wants a Wife	United Kingdom	
Fear Factor	Fear Factor	Netherlands	
Gameshow Marathon	Ant & Dec's Gameshow Marathon	United Kingdom	
Ghosts	Ghosts	United Kingdom	
Glitter Force	Smile PreCure!	Japan	
Glitter Force Doki Doki	DokiDoki! PreCure	Japan	
The Good Doctor	Good Doctor	South Korea	
Gracepoint	Broadchurch	United Kingdom	
Grand Hotel	Gran Hotel	Spain	
Grand Slam	Grand Slam	United Kingdom	
Hell's Kitchen	Hell's Kitchen	United Kingdom	
Homeland	Prisoners of War	Israel	
Traffic Light	Ramzor	Israel	
Hostages	Hostages	Israel	
Humans	Real Humans	Sweden	
I Am Frankie	Yo soy Franky	Colombia	
I Can See Your Voice	I Can See Your Voice	South Korea	
I'm a Celebrity...Get Me Out of Here!	I'm a Celebrity...Get Me Out of Here!	United Kingdom	
In Treatment	BeTipul	Israel	
The Inbetweeners	The Inbetweeners	United Kingdom	
Iron Chef America	Iron Chef	Japan	
Jane the Virgin	Juana la virgen	Venezuela	
Julie and the Phantoms	Julie e os Fantasmas	Brazil	
Kath & Kim	Kath & Kim	Australia	
Keep it Spotless	Spotless	United Kingdom	
Killer Karaoke	Sing If You Can	United Kingdom	
Killer Women	Mujeres Asesinas	Argentina	
The Killing	Forbrydelsen	Denmark	
Life on Mars	Life on Mars	United Kingdom	
Love Island	Love Island	United Kingdom	
Mew Mew Power	Tokyo Mew Mew	Japan	
Magical DoReMi	Ojamajo Doremi	Japan	
The Masked Singer	King of Mask Singer	South Korea	
MasterChef USA; MasterChef	MasterChef	United Kingdom	
Men Behaving Badly (American TV series)	Men Behaving Badly	United Kingdom	
Million Dollar Money Drop	The Million Pound Drop	United Kingdom	
Mighty Morphin' Power Rangers	Kyouryuu Sentai Zyuranger	Japan	
The Mole	De Mol	Belgium	
Must Love Kids	Single Moms	Sweden	
MXC	Takeshi's Castle	Japan	
No Activity	No Activity	Australia	
No Tomorrow	Como Aproveitar o Fim do Mundo	Brazil	
The Noise	The Noise	Japan	
Number 96	Number 96	Australia	
The Office	The Office	United Kingdom	
The One: Making a Music Star	Operacion Triunfo	Spain	The first reality competition show ABC has made up. This show described as the Fox won't let you see "Idol". The first to compete in 2006 with NBC's America's Got Talent and CBS' Rock Star. It was canceled after a few episodes.
Pokémon	Pocket Monsters	Japan	
Popstars USA	Popstars	New Zealand	
Power Rangers	Super Sentai	Japan	
Queer as Folk (2000) and Queer as Folk (2022)	Queer as Folk	United Kingdom	
Rake	Rake	Australia	
Ready.. Set... Cook!	Ready Steady Cook	United Kingdom	
The Returned	The Returned	France	
Rising Star	HaKokhav HaBa	Israel	
Salty's Lighthouse	Tugs	United Kingdom	
Samurai Pizza Cats	Kyatto Ninden Teyandee	Japan	
Sanford and Son	Steptoe and Son	United Kingdom	
Scoundrels	Outrageous Fortune	New Zealand	
Secret Millionaire	Secret Millionaire	United Kingdom	
Shameless	Shameless	United Kingdom	
Shark Tank	Money Tigers	Japan	
Shining Time Station	Thomas & Friends	United Kingdom	
Silent Library	Downtown no Gaki no Tsukai ya Arahende!!	Japan	The only show MTV was produced as it adapted from a Japanese game in a variety show.
Skating with the Stars	Dancing on Ice	United Kingdom	
Skins	Skins	United Kingdom	
The Slap	The Slap	Australia	
Splash	Sterren Springen Op Zaterdag	Netherlands	
Survivor	Expedition Robinson	Sweden	
Thank God You're Here	Thank God You're Here	Australia	
That's My Dog	That's My Dog	United Kingdom	
Three's Company	Man About the House	United Kingdom	
Three's a Crowd	Robin's Nest	United Kingdom	
The Tomorrow People (American TV series)	The Tomorrow People	United Kingdom	
Top of the Pops	Top of the Pops	United Kingdom	
Too Close for Comfort	Keep it in the Family	United Kingdom	
Trading Spaces	Changing Rooms	United Kingdom	
Ugly Betty	Yo soy Betty, la fea	Colombia	
Undercover Boss	Undercover Boss	United Kingdom	
Viva Laughlin	Blackpool	United Kingdom	
The Voice	The Voice of Holland	Netherlands	
VR Troopers	Choujinki Metalder; Dimensional Warrior Spielban; Space Sheriff Shaider	Japan	
Weakest Link	The Weakest Link	United Kingdom	
Wheel of Fortune	Million Dollar Wheel of Fortune	Australia	The Australian Million Dollar format that aired in May–June 2008 was adopted in the United States in September 2008.
Who Wants to Be a Millionaire (American game show)	Who Wants to Be a Millionaire? (British game show)	United Kingdom	
Whose Line Is It Anyway?	Whose Line Is It Anyway?	United Kingdom	
Wife Swap	Wife Swap	United Kingdom	
Wilfred	Wilfred	Australia	
The Winner Is	The Winner Is...	Netherlands	
Worst Week	The Worst Week of My Life	United Kingdom	
The X Factor	The X Factor	United Kingdom	
YooHoo & Friends	YooHoo & Friends	South Korea	

== See also ==
- List of television show franchises
