= Chip Oliver =

American football player (born 1944)

No. 56
- Position: Linebacker

Personal information
- Born: April 24, 1944 (age 82); Winona, Mississippi, U.S.
- Listed height: 6 ft 2 in (1.88 m)
- Listed weight: 220 lb (100 kg)

Career information
- High school: Hoover (San Diego, California)
- College: USC (1966–1967)
- NFL draft: 1968: 11th round, 298th overall pick

Career history
- Oakland Raiders (1968–1969)

Career AFL statistics
- Fumble recoveries: 2
- Interceptions: 1
- Touchdowns: 1
- Sacks: 3
- Stats at Pro Football Reference

Chip Oliver (born April 24, 1944) is an American former professional football player who was a linebacker for the Oakland Raiders of the American Football League (AFL) from 1968 to 1969. He played college football for the USC Trojans. Oliver became a starter with the Raiders in 1968. He quit the team in 1970 to join One World Family of the Messiah's World Crusade. He wanted to, but was unable to return to the team in 1971.

Oliver played the son-in-law Richard in "Those Were the Days," a 1969 television pilot which was the second attempt to start a sitcom eventually titled All in the Family.

Oliver was also the author of the 1971 book High for the Game: From Football Gladiator to Hippie, a Former Southern Cal and Oakland Raider Linebacker Tells All. In a commentary on the book, Todd Tobias says "Oliver blasts professional football for treating players as pieces of meat, pumping them full of pain-numbing drugs and amphetamines, and then discarding them like common garbage when they can no longer sustain high levels of play on the field. In a way, Oliver was ahead of his time in his beliefs, and willingness to vocalize them." But that Oliver "loses vast amounts of credibility when he describes attending practices high on mescaline, advocates the use of LSD, and talks about smoking enormous amounts of marijuana."
