= TV Guide's 50 Greatest TV Shows of All Time =

TV show rankings

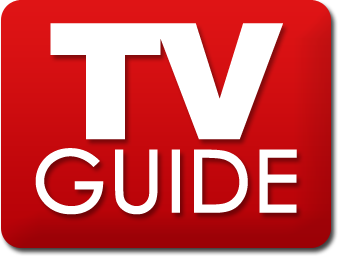

TV Guide's 50 Greatest TV Shows of All Time is TV Guide's list of the 50 most entertaining or influential television series in American pop culture. It appeared in the May 4–10, 2002 issue of the magazine, which was the second in a series of six special issues commemorating TV Guide's 50th year (the others were "TV We'll Always Remember", "50 Greatest Covers", "50 Worst TV Shows of All Time", "50 Greatest Cartoon Characters" and "50 Sexiest Stars"). The list was also counted down in an ABC television special, TV Guide's 50 Best Shows of All Time, on May 13, 2002.

The 50 entries, chosen and ranked by the editors of TV Guide, consist of regularly scheduled series spanning more than half a century of television. TV movies, miniseries and specials were not eligible.

The TV special aired at 10pm EST/9pm CST and was viewed by 8.9 million homes, giving it a 6 rating and a 10 share. Considering the cover story for this special issue of TV Guide, it was the only one of the six issues to be presented on television.

== Summary ==
The earliest aired show appearing on the list is The Ed Sullivan Show, which first aired in 1948. The most recently premiered show is The Sopranos, which first aired in 1999. The show with the shortest run is An American Family, which aired only twelve episodes and two subsequent special episodes. The longest-running show on the list is The Today Show, which has aired since 1952. 41 of the shows are prime time, five are daytime and four are late-night. NBC has the most shows on the list with 17, counting the final season of Taxi; otherwise, it ties with CBS at 16. ABC has eight, Fox, HBO and PBS each have two and The WB and UPN have a shared entry, Buffy the Vampire Slayer. Three are syndicated.

== Top 10 ==
1. Seinfeld (NBC, 1989–1998)
2. I Love Lucy (CBS, 1951–1957)
3. The Honeymooners (CBS, 1955–1956)
4. All in the Family (CBS, 1971–1979)
5. The Sopranos (HBO, 1999–2007)
6. 60 Minutes (CBS, 1968–present)
7. Late Show with David Letterman (CBS, 1993–2015)
8. The Simpsons (Fox, 1989–present)
9. The Andy Griffith Show (CBS, 1960–1968)
10. Saturday Night Live (NBC, 1975–present)

== See also ==
- TV Guide's 100 Greatest Episodes of All-Time
