= All in a Family =

- Clockwise from top left: Autumn, Spring, John, Father/Mr Tang, Mother/Mrs Tang, Jackie, Summer, Scudder, Cameron.
- Created by: RTHK
- Starring: Chan Chun Wah; Siu-ha Chan; Angela Chow; Andrew Johnston; Priscilla Koo Kei-Kwun; Wilson Lam; Scudder Smith; Pierre Tremblay; May Tse
- Country of origin: Hong Kong

Production
- Running time: 25 Minutes

Original release
- Network: TVB
- Release: April 1994 – 1996

All in a Family (Chinese: 四海一家) was an immensely popular Hong Kong drama that first screened in 1994. It was based on the British television series Till Death Us Do Part.

== Cast ==
- Chan Chun Wah - Father/Mr Tang
- Siu-ha Chan - Autumn
- Angela Chow - Jackie
- Andrew Johnston - Cameron
- Priscilla Koo - Spring
- Wilson Lam - Summer
- Scudder Smith - Scudder
- Pierre Tremblay - John
- May Tse - Mother/Mrs Tang

== Episodes ==
Series 1

1. Father and Daughter
2. When Summer met Jackie
3. HONG KONG - My Home
4. New Kid In The Village
5. My Old Mom
6. School-time
7. Roots
8. Farewell to My Village
9. The Courtship
10. The Wedding
11. A Family Affair
