= Don Roberts (art director) =

American television art director and production designer

- Born: November 16, 1934; California, U.S.
- Died: January 10, 1999 (aged 64); Woodland Hills, California, U.S.
- Occupations: Television art director, production designer

Don Roberts (November 16, 1934 – January 10, 1999) was an American television art director and production designer. He worked on Norman Lear's sitcoms, including, All in the Family, The Jeffersons, Good Times, One Day at a Time, Archie Bunker's Place and Mary Hartman, Mary Hartman. He also worked on Three's Company and its spin-offs The Ropers and Three's a Crowd. He was involved in the development of at least 46 television programs.

Roberts started his career directing musicals for the Santa Monica Civic Light Opera. He also worked on The Price Is Right for 247 episodes from (1972–1973). His other credits include, Who's the Boss?, Diff'rent Strokes, 227, Married... with Children, Gimme a Break! and The Famous Teddy Z. In 1977, Roberts was nominated for a Primetime Emmy Award for Outstanding Art Direction or Scenic Design For a Comedy Series.

Roberts died in January 1999 of a brain tumor at the Motion Picture & Television Fund in Woodland Hills, California, at the age of 64. He was from the Wilmington neighbourhood of Los Angeles.
