= Golden Globe Award for Best Actor =

Golden Globe Award for Best Actor can refer to:

- Golden Globe Award for Best Actor – Miniseries or Television Film
- Golden Globe Award for Best Actor – Motion Picture Drama
- Golden Globe Award for Best Actor – Motion Picture Musical or Comedy
- Golden Globe Award for Best Actor – Television Series Drama
- Golden Globe Award for Best Actor – Television Series Musical or Comedy
