= Sammee Tong =

American actor (1901–1964)

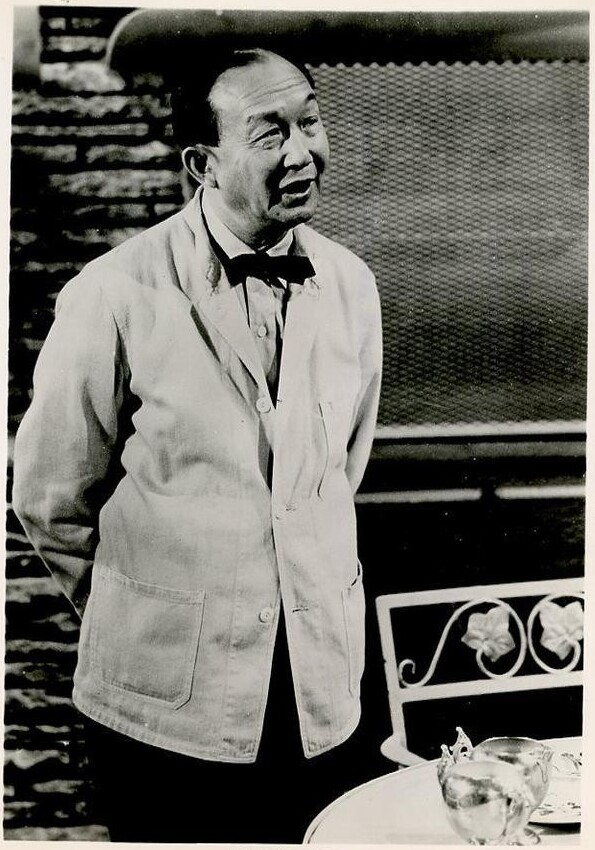
- Tong in a publicity photo for Bachelor Father (1957–1962)
- Born: April 21, 1901; San Francisco, California, U.S.
- Died: October 27, 1964 (aged 63); Los Angeles, California, U.S.
- Resting place: Forest Lawn Memorial Park, Glendale
- Other name: Sammy Tong
- Occupation: Actor
- Years active: 1934–1964

Sammee Tong (April 21, 1901 – October 27, 1964) was an American film and television character actor. One of Tong's more notable roles was that of Peter Tong on the sitcom Bachelor Father, which aired on all three national networks from 1957 to 1962.

== Early life and career ==
Born in San Francisco, Tong lived in Palo Alto before moving with his family to Honolulu. He graduated from Stanford University.

Tong attempted to break into acting on the stage during the Depression, forming an act called the Three Celestials that played in neighborhood theaters and was booked into the Los Angeles Orpheum. He found he could not secure acting roles because of his ethnicity. He worked in Chinese nightclubs in New York City, Los Angeles, and San Francisco, where he sang and performed comedy routines. During his nightclub years, he changed the spelling of his name to "Sammee" because he said it "looked better in print".

== Career ==
Tong signed with Columbia Pictures, and in 1934, he made his film debut in a bit part in the comedy film The Captain Hates the Sea. In 1939 he returned to his home town as director of entertainment at the Chinese Village of San Francisco's World's Fair, and began the first Chinese radio hour on KSAN. Throughout the 1940s, he had small, usually uncredited, roles in films. He returned to Hollywood in the early 1950s and took roles on television.

Tong made his television debut in 1953 in an episode of You Are There. The following year, he appeared in a recurring role as "George, the cook" in a series of television shorts which aired during The Mickey Mouse Club entitled The Adventures of Spin and Marty. In 1955, he reprised his role as George in the feature-length film Spin and Marty: The Movie. He also had a role in the sequel series The Further Adventures of Spin and Marty.

In 1957, he landed a co-starring role in the sitcom Bachelor Father, starring John Forsythe and Noreen Corcoran. In the series, Tong portrayed "Peter Tong,” Bentley Gregg's (Forsythe) live-in houseboy and valet. Although he was playing a servant, Tong enjoyed the role stating, "Houseboys in movies and the theater always bow low, mutter a few sing song words and disappear, but not on this show. I get dialogue and laughs." In his Bachelor Father role, Tong was not subservient and at one point walked out because he was not paid enough. He spoke with an accent even though the actor was born in the United States.

After Bachelor Father's cancellation in 1962, Tong was cast as Sammy Ling in the ABC sitcom Mickey, starring Mickey Rooney. Due to low ratings, ABC was considering canceling Mickey. The network was hesitant to cancel the series due to the popularity of Tong's character who had a solid fanbase thanks to Tong's role in Bachelor Father. Tong's death effectively ended any chance for the series' survival and ABC canceled Mickey in December 1964.

Tong's final screen appearance was as "Cook" in the 1965 film Fluffy, starring Tony Randall and Shirley Jones. The film was released after Tong's death.

== Death ==
Tong, who was married to May Tong (nee Young) and had one child, Kingsley Tong, was found dead in his Palms, Los Angeles apartment by his close friend, Ben Wong, on October 27, 1964. Tong had died from an intentional barbiturate overdose. Police found an empty bottle of sleeping pills by his body and several notes addressed to his landlady, his attorney and police. In the note addressed to police, he gave no reason why he committed suicide only stating, "I have taken my own life. No one is to blame." Tong is buried in Forest Lawn Memorial Park in Glendale, California.

In his 1991 autobiography, Life is Too Short, Tong's co-star Mickey Rooney claimed that Tong was a heavy gambler and committed suicide over money problems. According to Rooney, Tong became despondent and upset after learning that Mickey faced cancellation because he owed money to the mafia.

== Filmography ==
Film
Year	Title	Role	Notes
1934	The Captain Hates the Sea	Sin Kee	Uncredited
1935	Charlie Chan in Shanghai	Waiter	Uncredited
1936	Love Before Breakfast	Steward	Uncredited
1936	The Accusing Finger	Chinese Man	Uncredited
1936	Happy Go Lucky	Driver	Uncredited
1936	Stowaway	Bing Crosby Imitator	Uncredited
1937	The Good Earth	Chinese Man	Uncredited
1937	Think Fast, Mr. Moto	Cheela - Marloff's Houseboy	Uncredited
1937	Youth on Parole	Chinese Orchestra Leader	Uncredited
1937	West of Shanghai	Messenger	Uncredited
1937	Daughter of Shanghai	Chinese Alien in Airplane	Uncredited
1939	Only Angels Have Wings	Sam the Cook	Uncredited
1943	China	Aide to Japanese General	Uncredited
1945	God Is My Co-Pilot	Chinese Civilian	Uncredited
1945	Out of This World	Chinese Radio Announcer	Uncredited
1950	Woman on the Run	Witness to Suzie's Fall	Uncredited
1955	The Left Hand of God	Servant	Uncredited
1955	Spin and Marty: The Movie	George	
1956	Godzilla, King of the Monsters!	Dr. Yamane	Voice, Uncredited
1956	Flight to Hong Kong	Shop Proprietor	Uncredited
1957	The Iron Sheriff	Charley Key - Laundry Owner	Uncredited
1957	The Midnight Story	Restaurant Proprietor	Uncredited
1957	Man of a Thousand Faces	Chinese Extra	Uncredited
1957	Slaughter on Tenth Avenue	Sam, Chinese Waiter	Uncredited
1957	Hell Bound	Murdered Seaman	Uncredited
1957	Stopover Tokyo	Diplomat	Uncredited
1958	Suicide Battalion	Papa Lily	Credited as Sammy Tong
1959	Battle Flame	Chinese Prisoner	Uncredited
1963	It's a Mad, Mad, Mad, Mad World	Chinese Laundryman	
1964	For Those Who Think Young	Clyde	
1965	Fluffy	Cook	Released posthumously, (final film role)

Television
Year	Title	Role	Notes
1953–1954	You Are There		2 episodes
1955	The Adventures of Spin and Marty	George, the cook	Unknown episodes
1956	Judge Roy Bean	Ah Sid	Episode: "Ah Sid, Cowboy"
1956	The Further Adventures of Spin and Marty	Sam	Unknown episodes
1956	Matinee Theater	Nurseryman	Episode: "All the Trees In the Field"
1956	Sky King	Ipp	Episode: "Red Tentacles"
1956	The Man Called X		2 episodes
1956	Death Valley Days	Thomas Bottle	Episode: "Bill Bottle's Birthday"
1956	Cavalcade of America		Episode: "Diplomatic Outpost"
1956	My Friend Flicka	Wong	Episode: "Lost River"
1956	Hey, Jeannie!	Lee	Episode: "The Proprietor"
1957	General Electric Theater	Peter Tong	Episode: "A New Girl In His Life"
1959	The Californians	Quon Wei	Episode: "Gold-Tooth Charlie"
1959	Bonanza	Hop Ling	Episode: "A Rose for Lotta"
1960	Hawaiian Eye	Mr. Nishimaka	Episode: "Dead Ringer"
1957–1962	Bachelor Father	Peter Tong	157 episodes
1964	The Jack Benny Program	Maitre d' of Lotus Blosom Inn	Episode: "How Jack Found Dennis"
1964–1965	Mickey	Sammy Ling	17 episodes (some aired posthumously)
