= Golden Globe Award for Best Actor – Television Series Musical or Comedy =

Award for best actor in a television comedy series

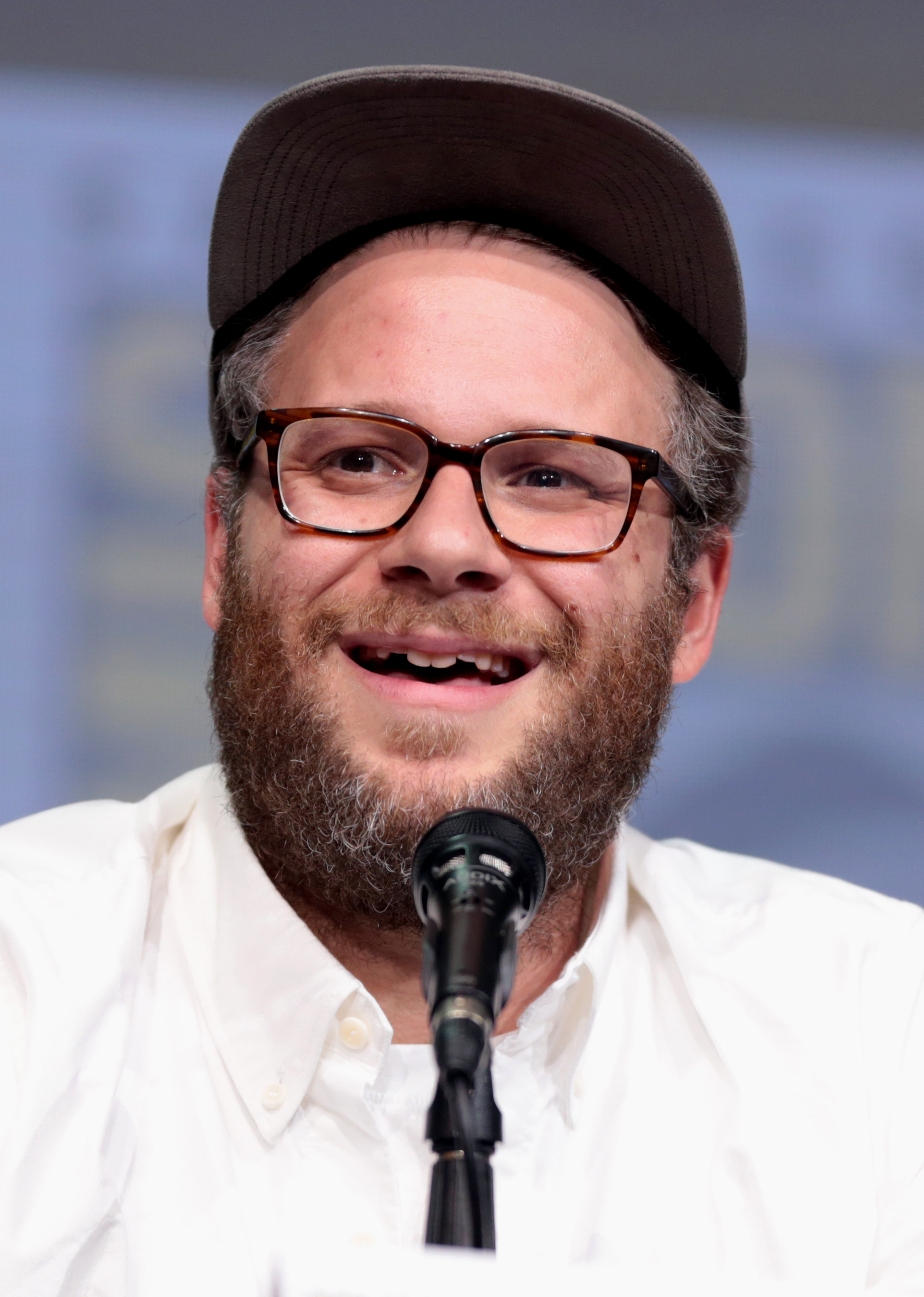
- The 2025 Recipient: Seth Rogen
- Awarded for: Best Performance by an Actor in a Leading Role in a Television Series Musical or Comedy
- Country: United States
- Presented by: Hollywood Foreign Press Association
- First award: March 5, 1962
- Currently held by: Seth Rogen, The Studio (2025)

Highlights
- Most awards: Alan Alda (6)
- Most nominations: Alan Alda (11)
- Website: goldenglobes.org

The Golden Globe Award for Best Actor – Television Series Musical or Comedy is a Golden Globe Award presented annually by the Hollywood Foreign Press Association (HFPA). It is given in honor of an actor who has delivered an outstanding performance in a leading role on a musical or comedy television series for the calendar year.

It was first awarded at the 19th Golden Globe Awards on March 5, 1962, under the title Best TV Star – Male to John Charles Daly and Bob Newhart. The nominees for the award announced annually starting in 1963. The award initially honored actors in both comedy and drama genres until 1969, when the award was split into categories that honored comedic and dramatic performances separately. It was presented under the new title Best TV Actor – Musical or Comedy and in 1980 under its current title.

Since its inception, the award has been given to 45 actors. Alan Alda has won the most awards in this category with six wins and received the most nominations at 11.

== Winners and nominees ==
Listed below are the winners of the award for each year, as well as the other nominees.

Key	Meaning
‡	Indicates the winning actor.

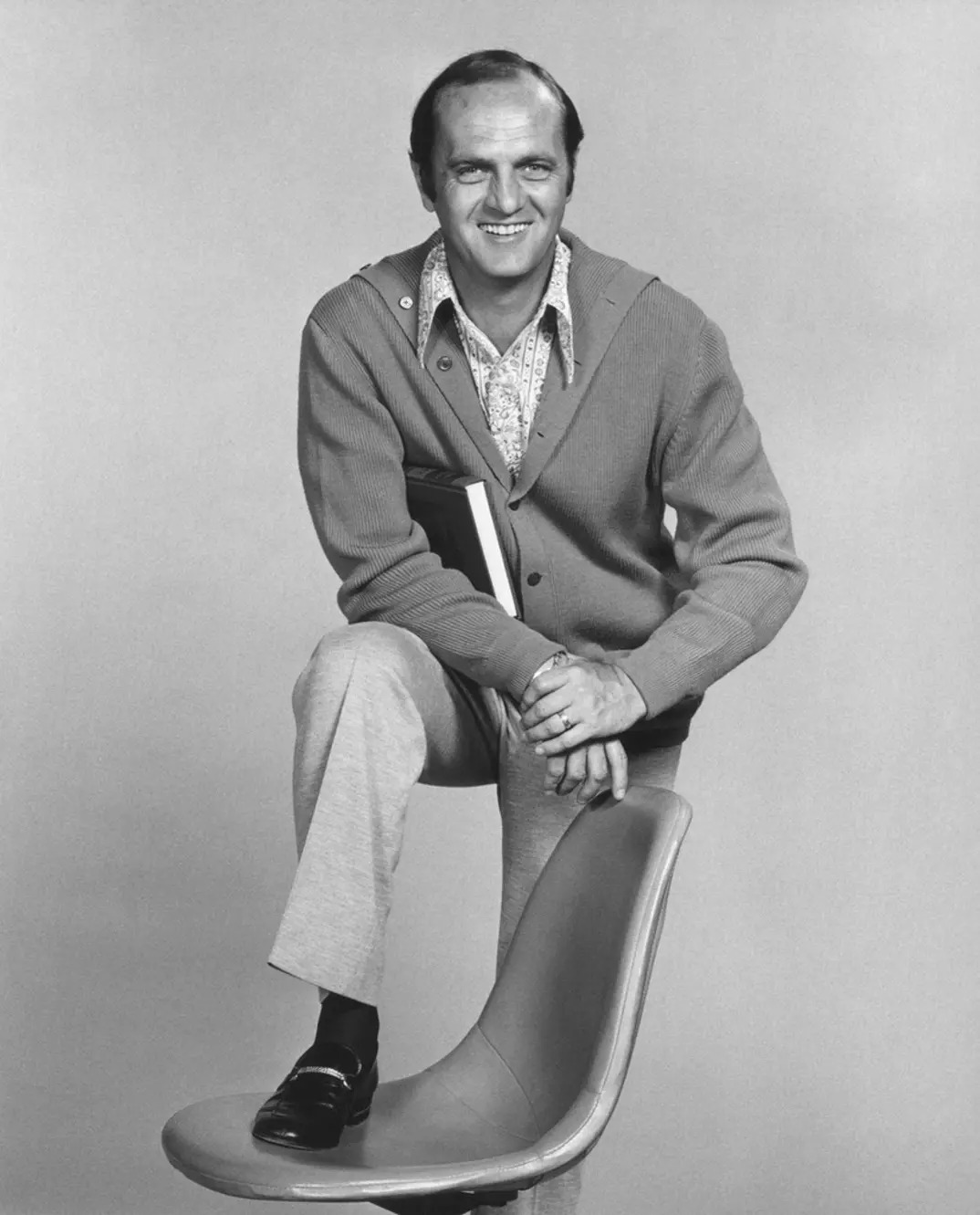
Bob Newhart tied with John Charles Daly as the first recipient of the award.

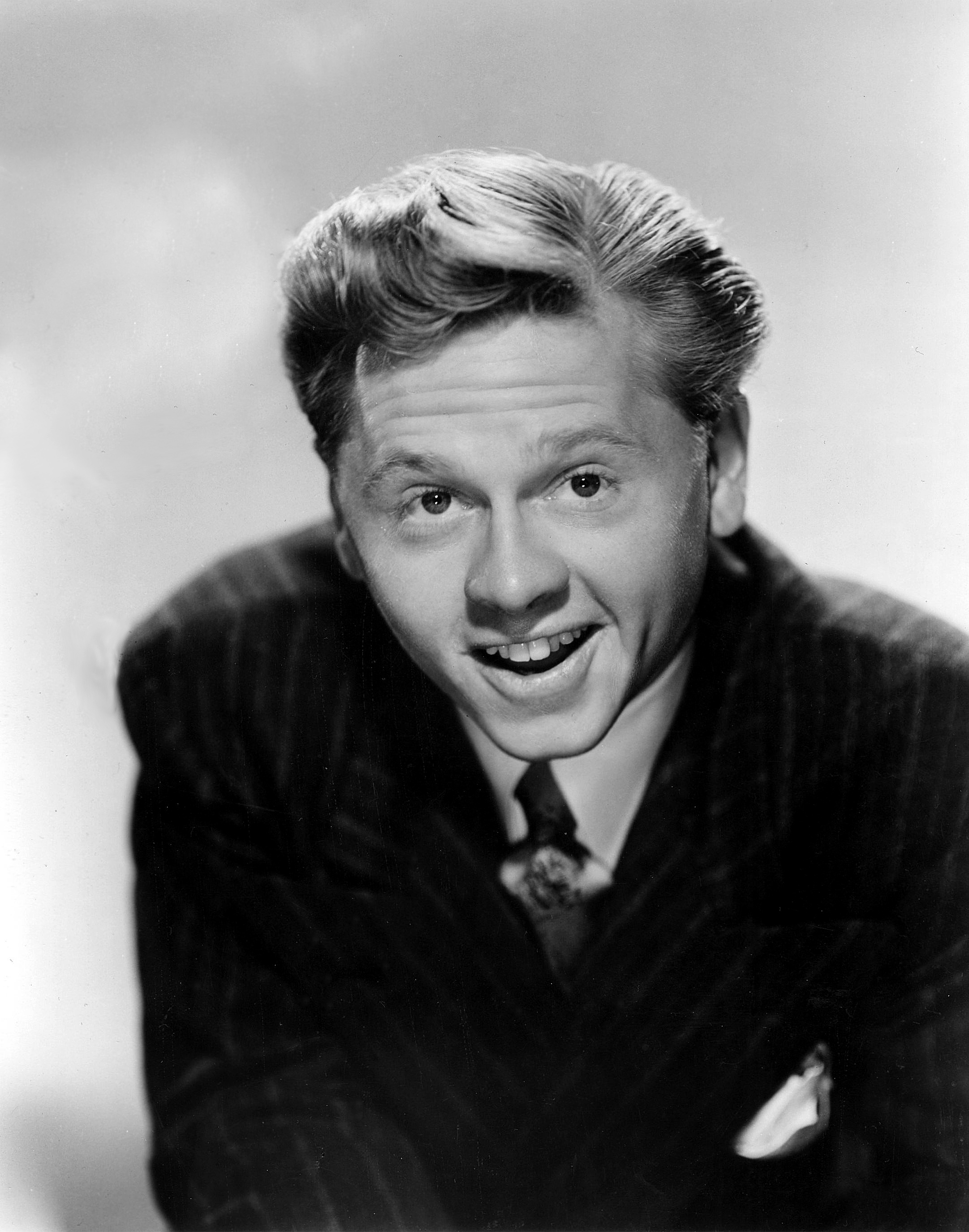
Mickey Rooney won the award in 1963 for his work on Mickey.

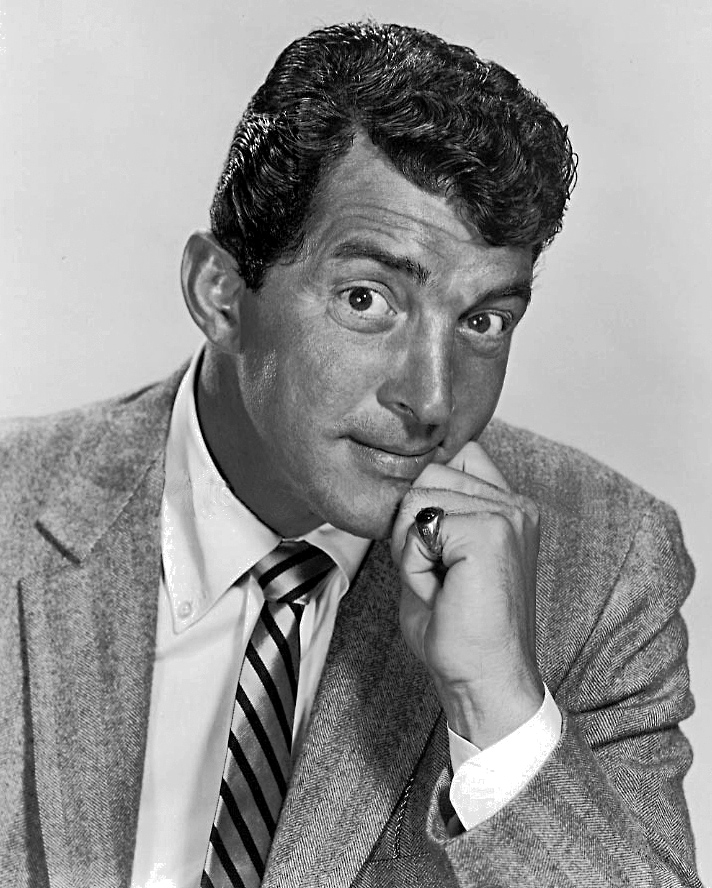
Dean Martin won for The Dean Martin Show.

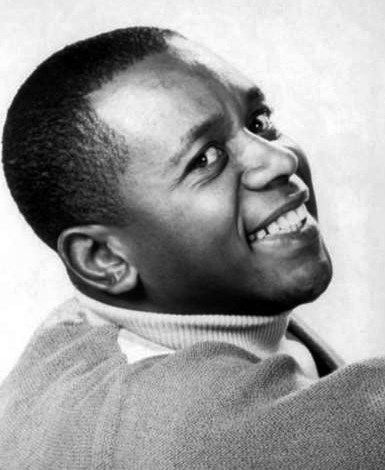
Flip Wilson won for The Flip Wilson Show.

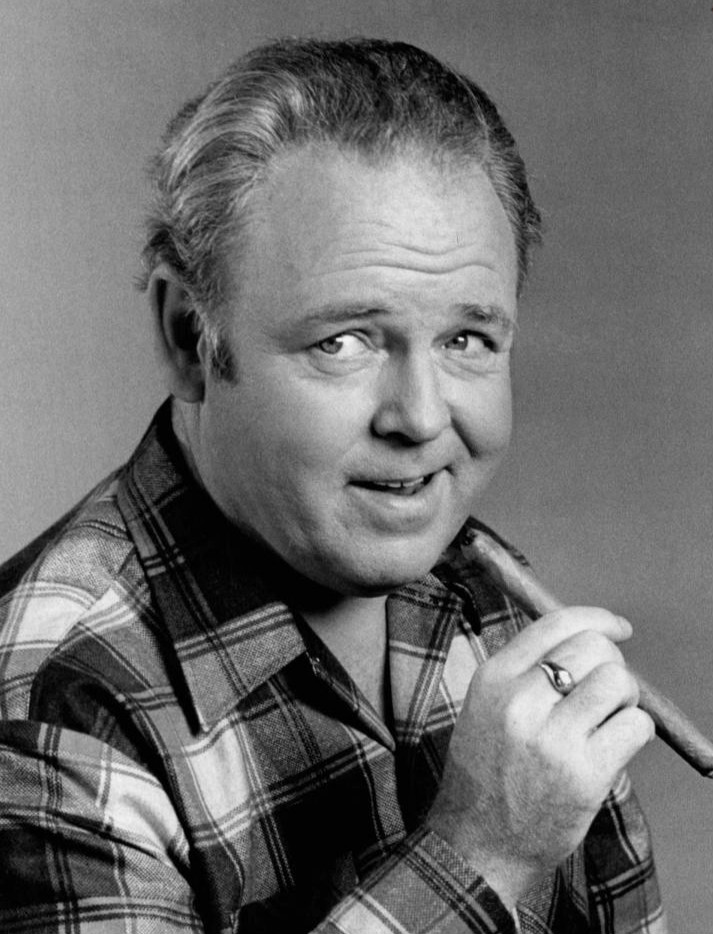
Carroll O'Connor won the award in 1971 for his role as Archie Bunker on All in the Family.

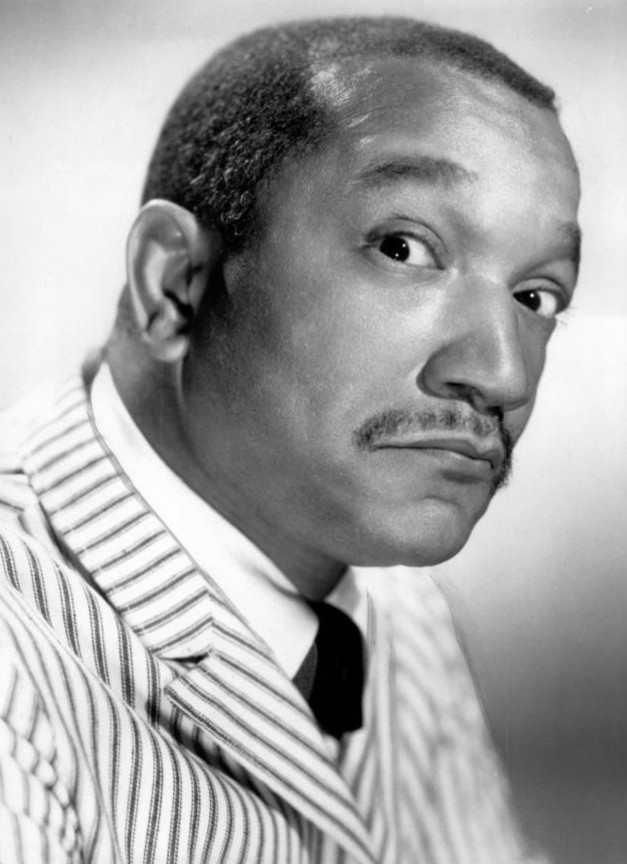
Redd Foxx won for Sanford and Son

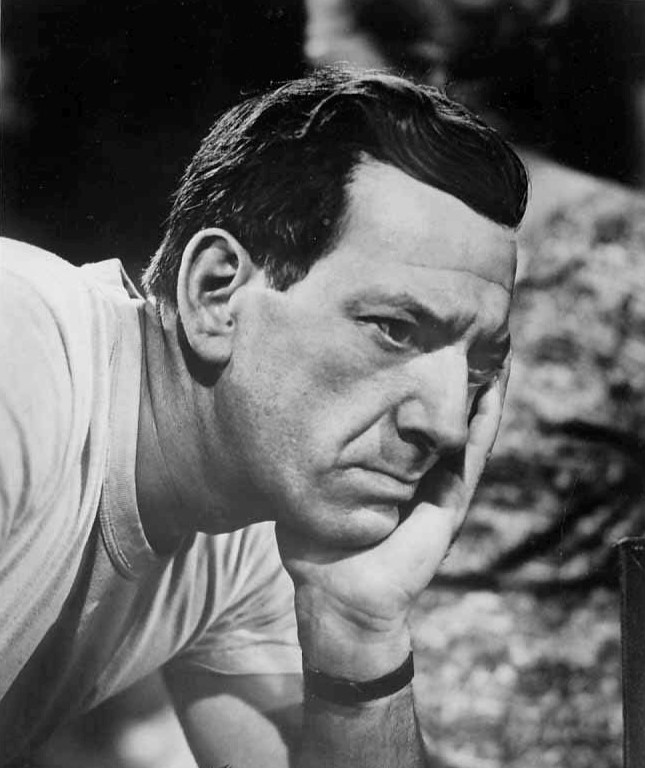
Jack Klugman won the award in 1974 for The Odd Couple.

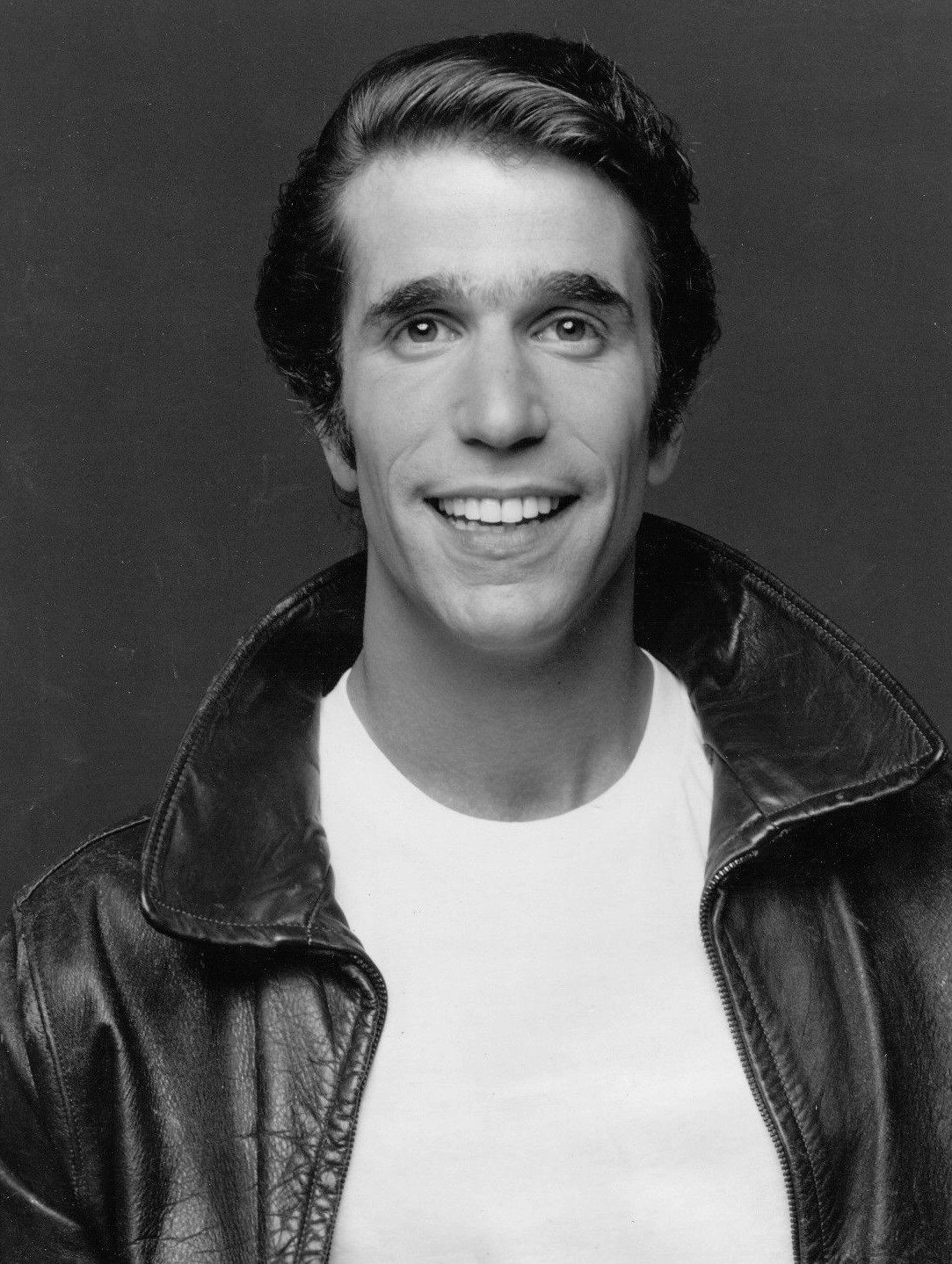
Henry Winkler won twice for Arthur "Fonzie" Fonzarelli on Happy Days.

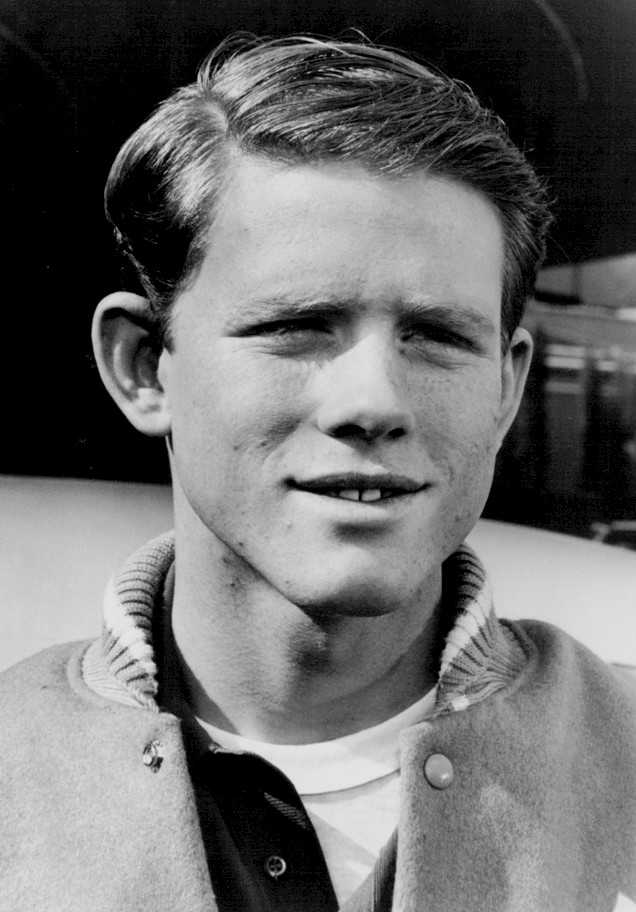
Ron Howard won playing Richie Cunningham on Happy Days in 1977.

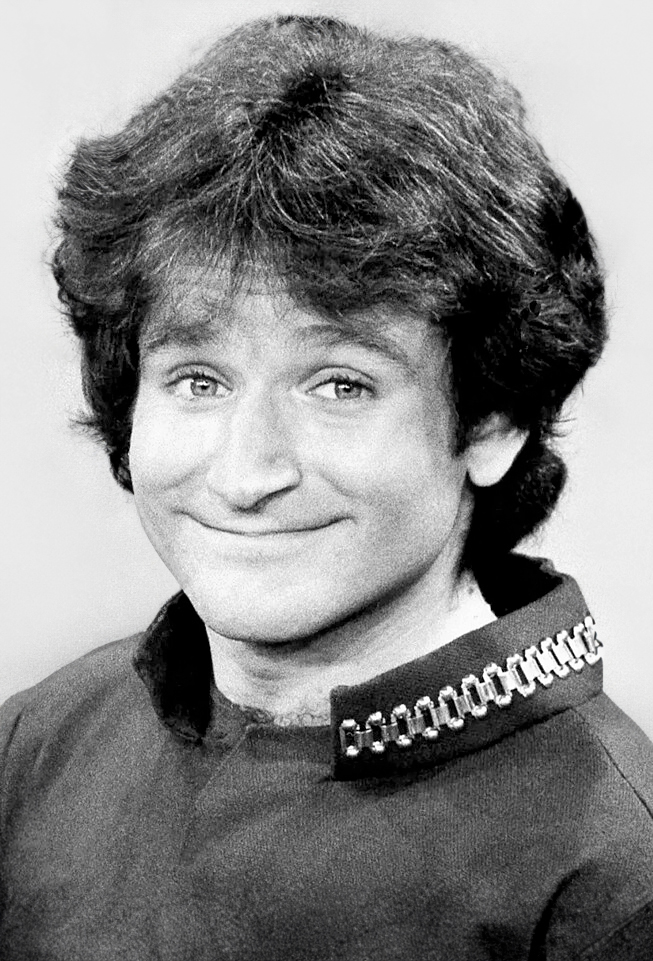
Robin Williams won in 1979 for Mork & Mindy.

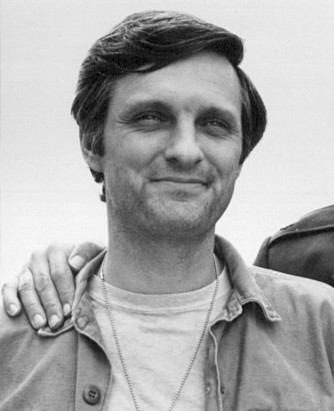
Alan Alda won six times portraying Hawkeye Pierce on M*A*S*H.

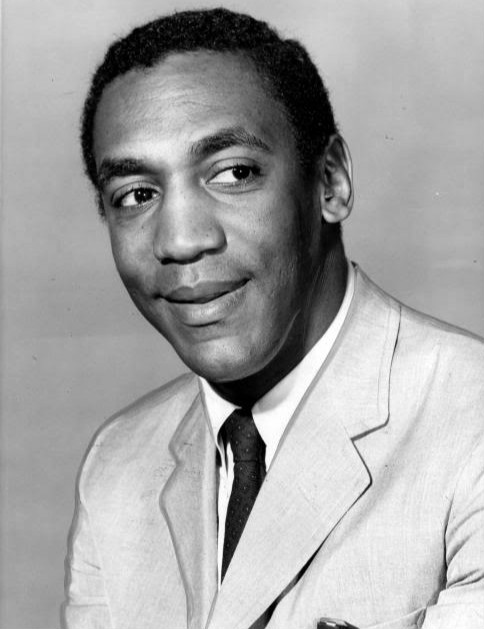
Bill Cosby won twice playing Cliff Huxtable in The Cosby Show

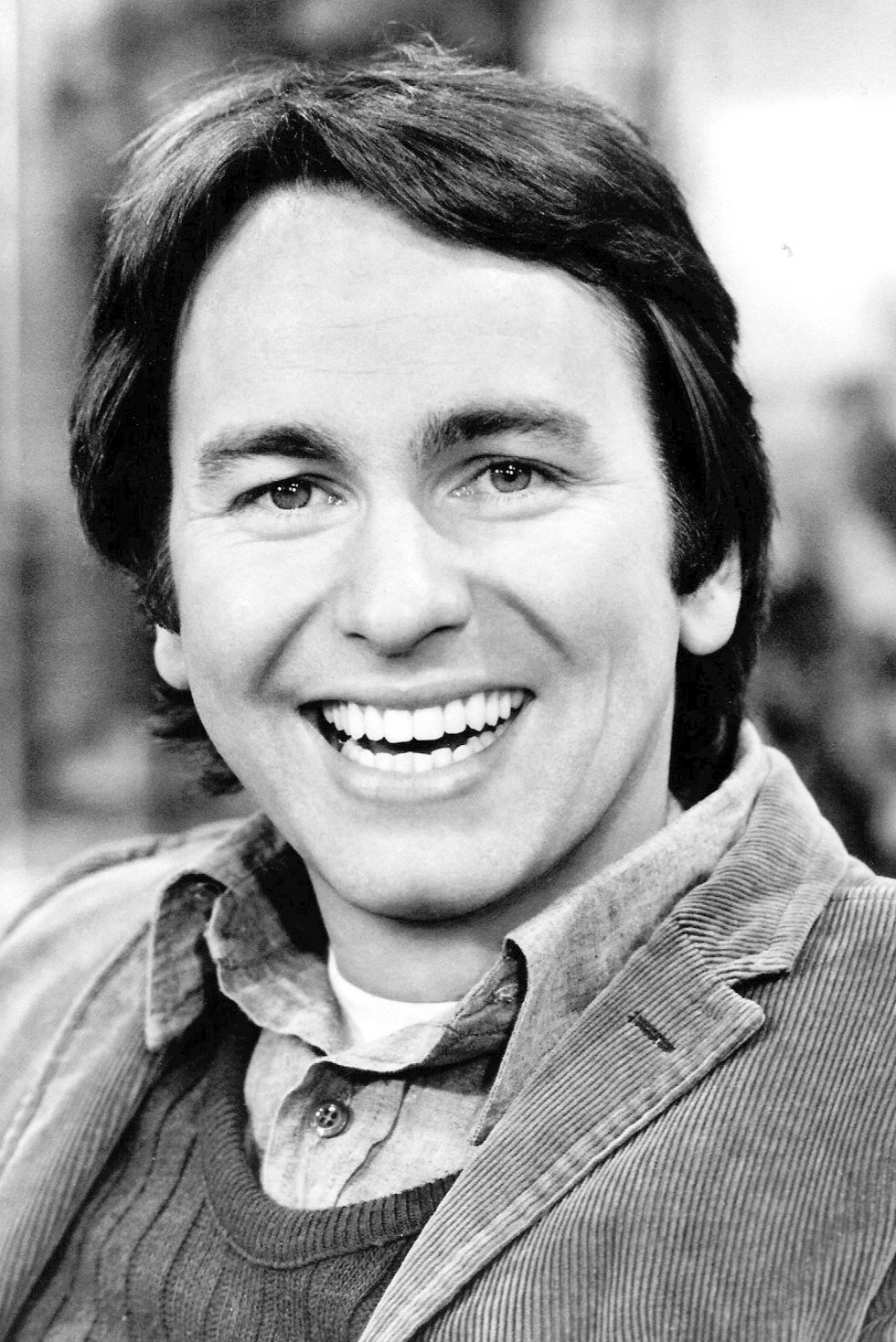
John Ritter won for Threes Company in 1983.

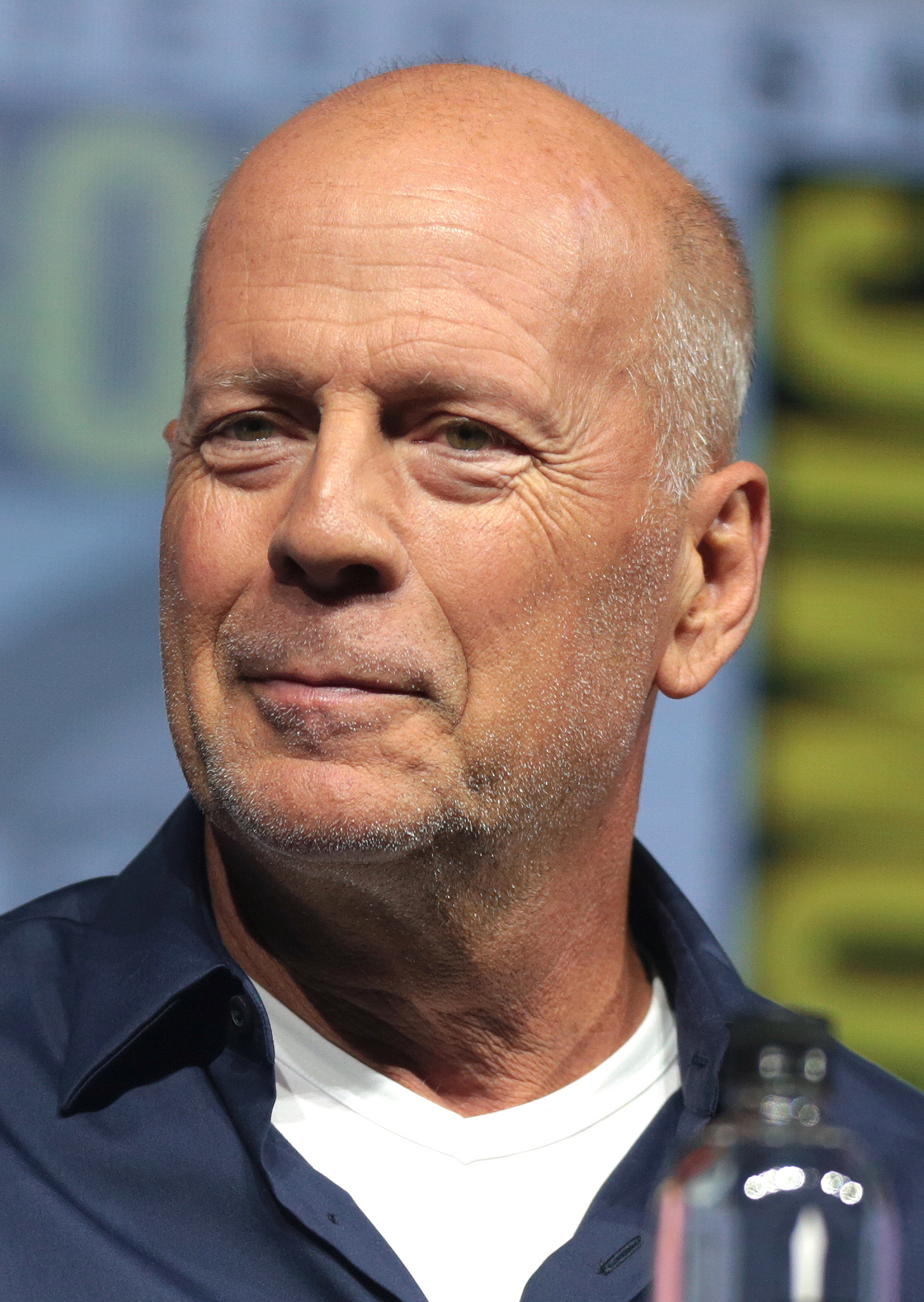
Bruce Willis won for Moonlighting in 1986.

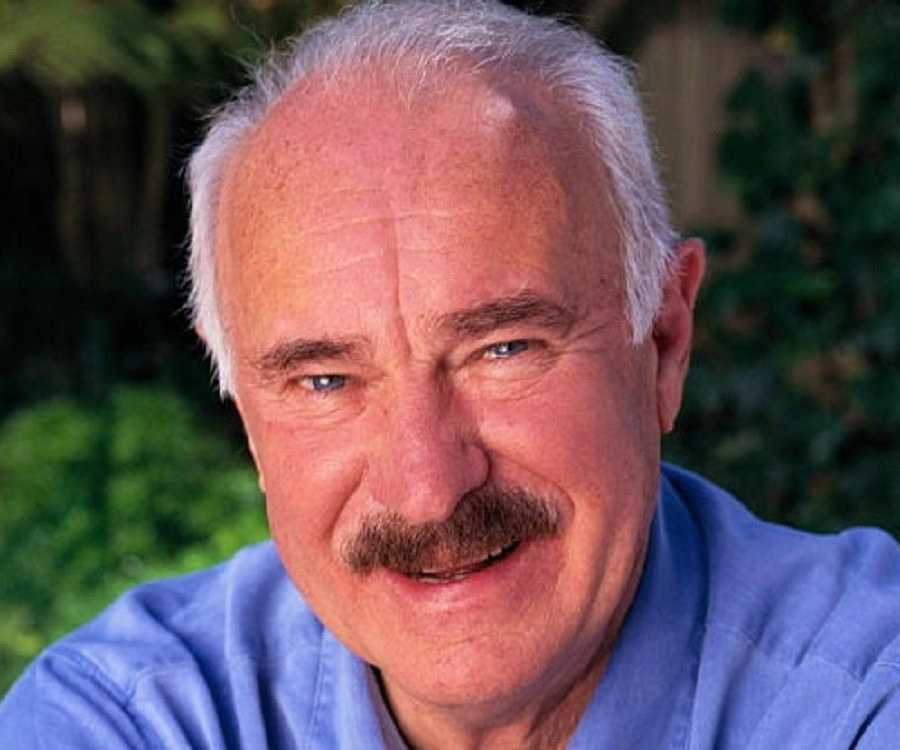
Dabney Coleman won for The Slap Maxwell Story in 1987.

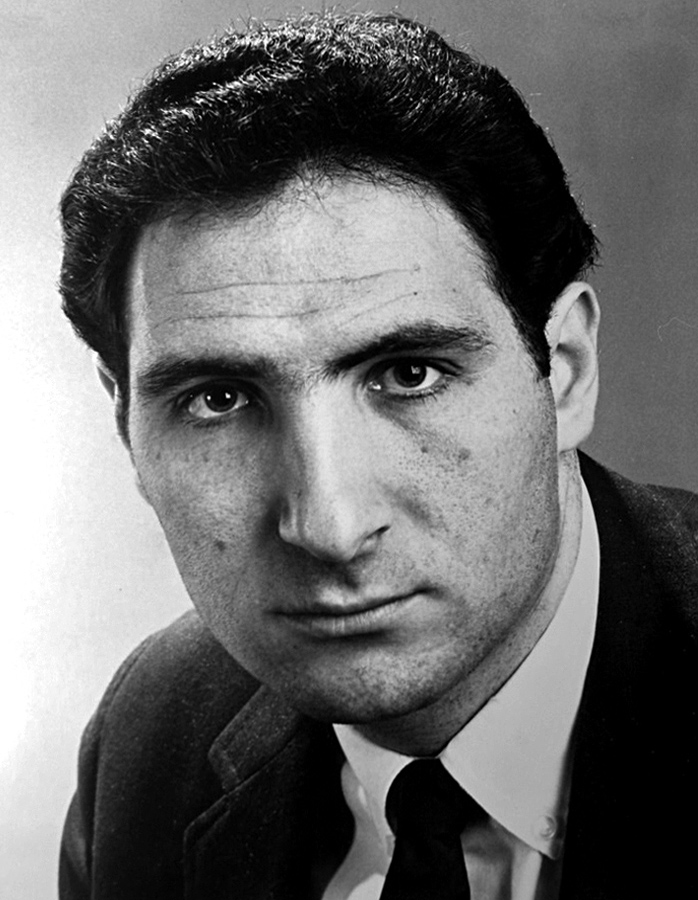
Judd Hirsch won for Dear John in 1988.

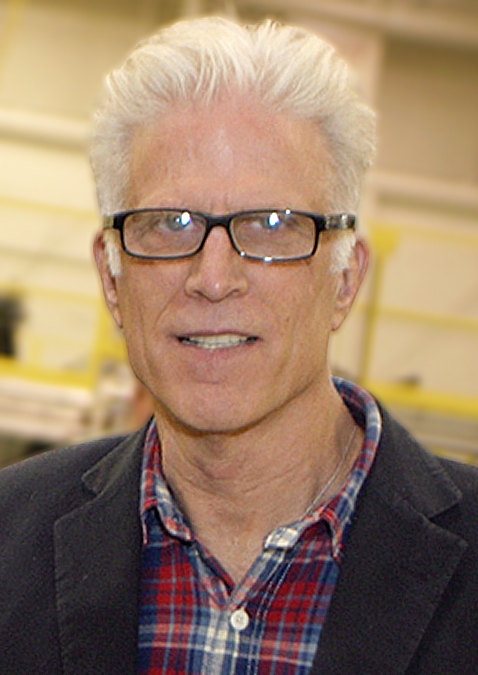
Ted Danson won twice for Cheers.

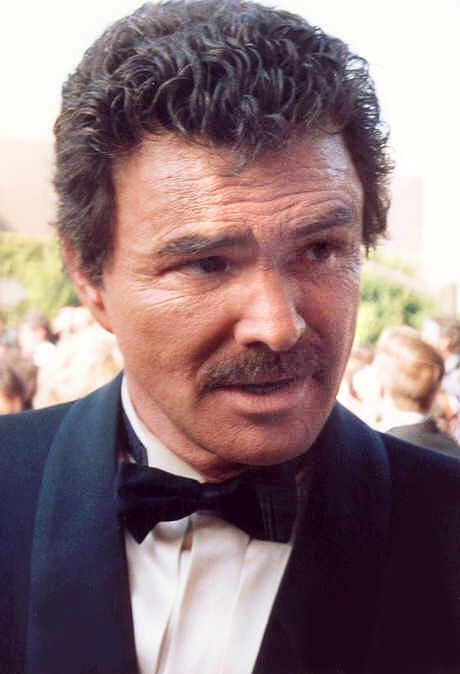
Burt Reynolds won for Evening Shade in 1991.

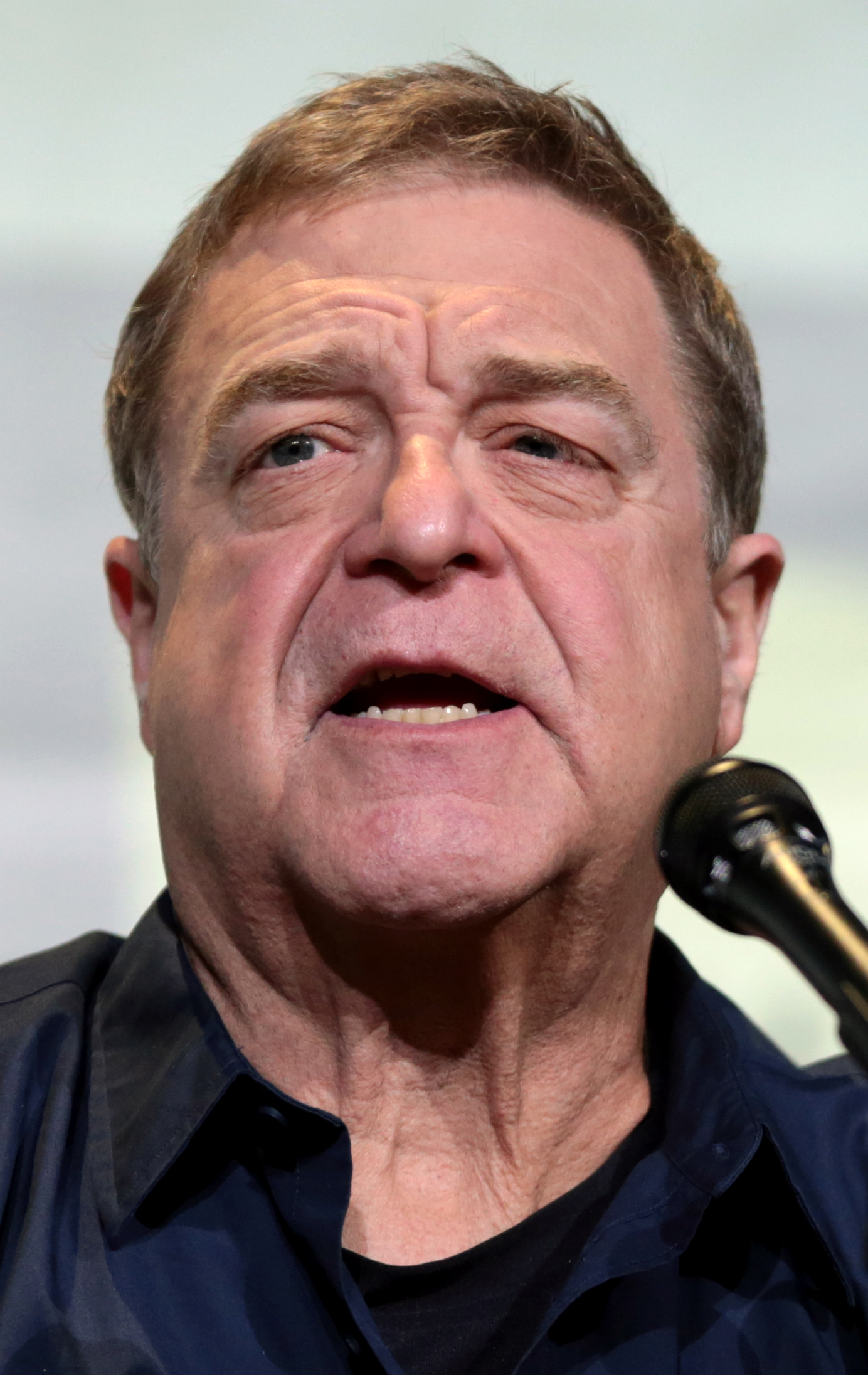
John Goodman won Dan Conner on Roseanne in 1992.

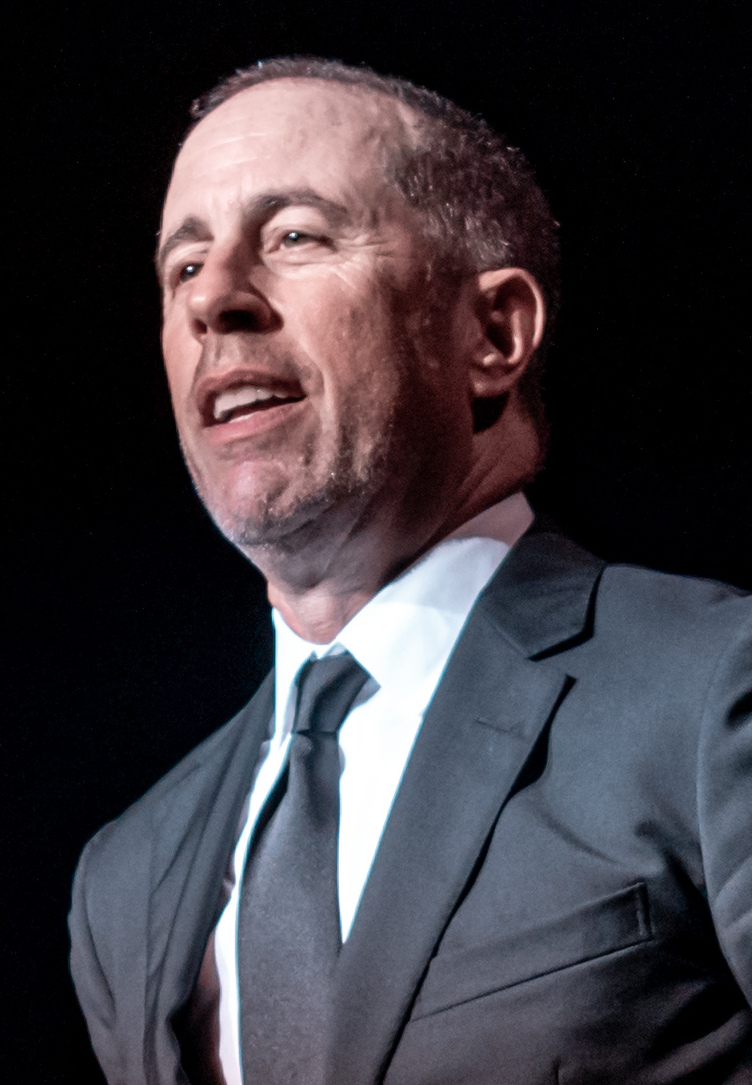
Jerry Seinfeld won the 1993 award for Seinfeld.

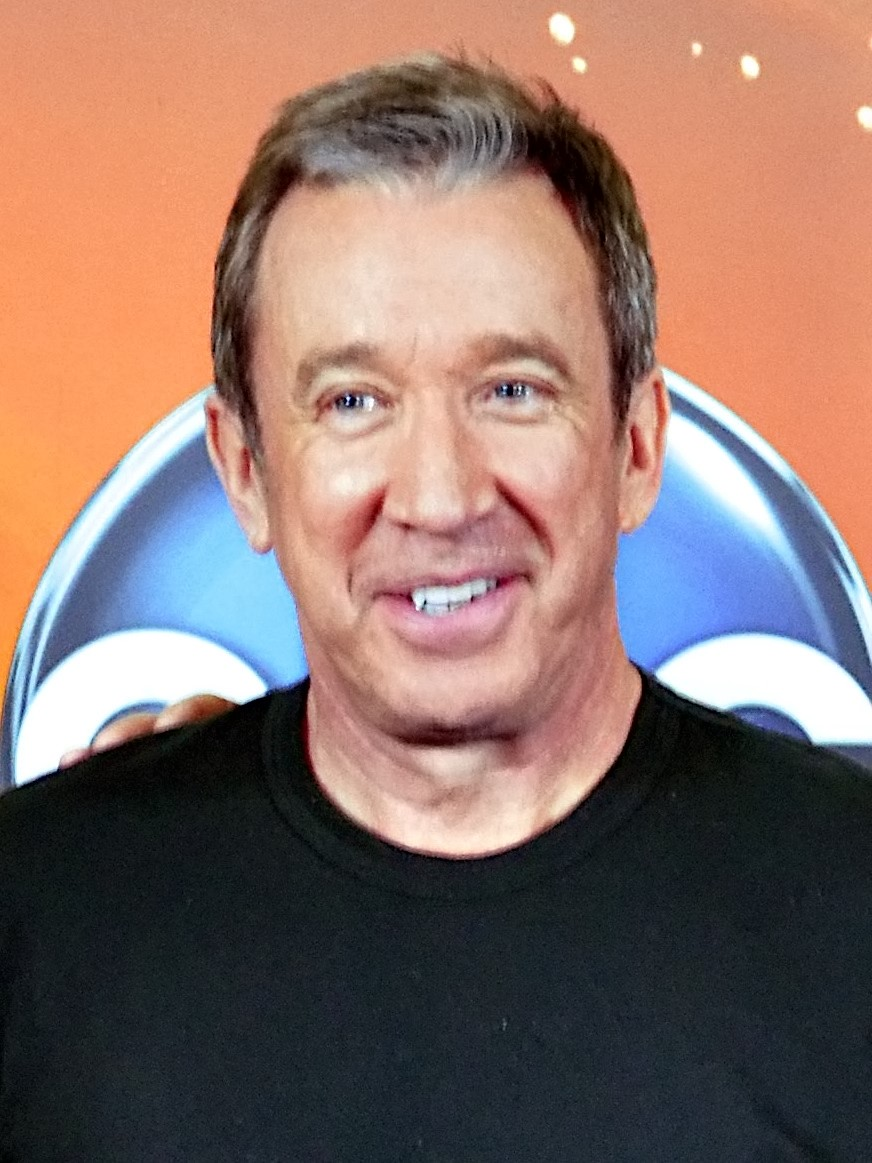
Tim Allen won in 1994 for his role on Home Improvement.

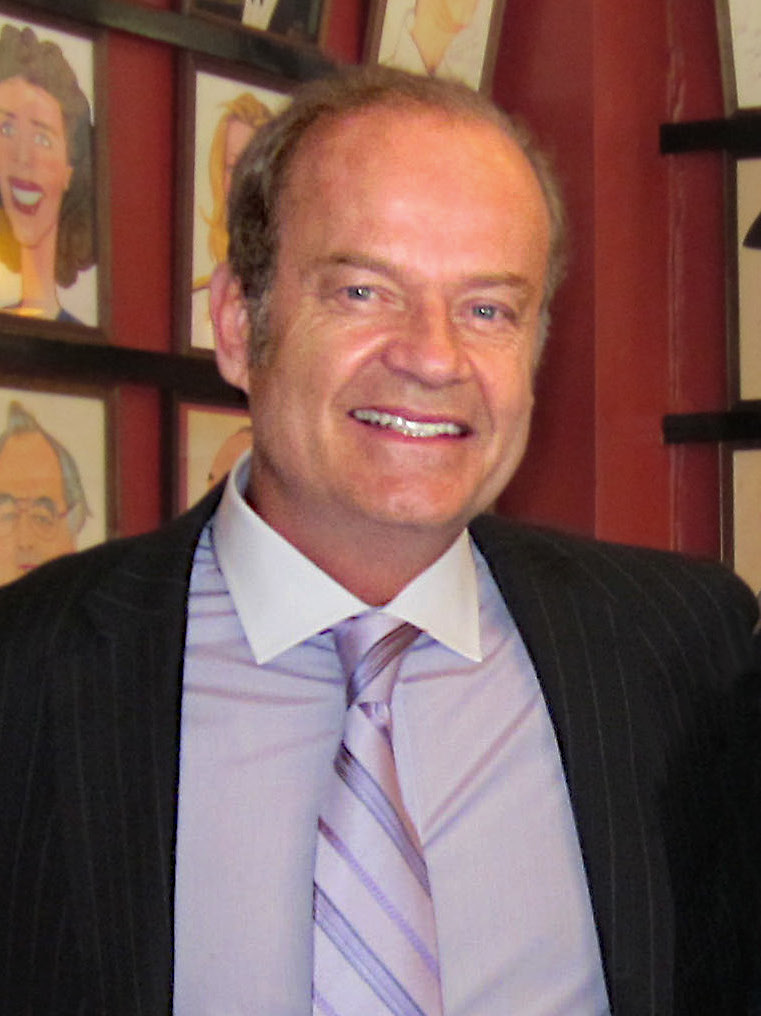
Kelsey Grammer won twice playing the titular character on Frasier.

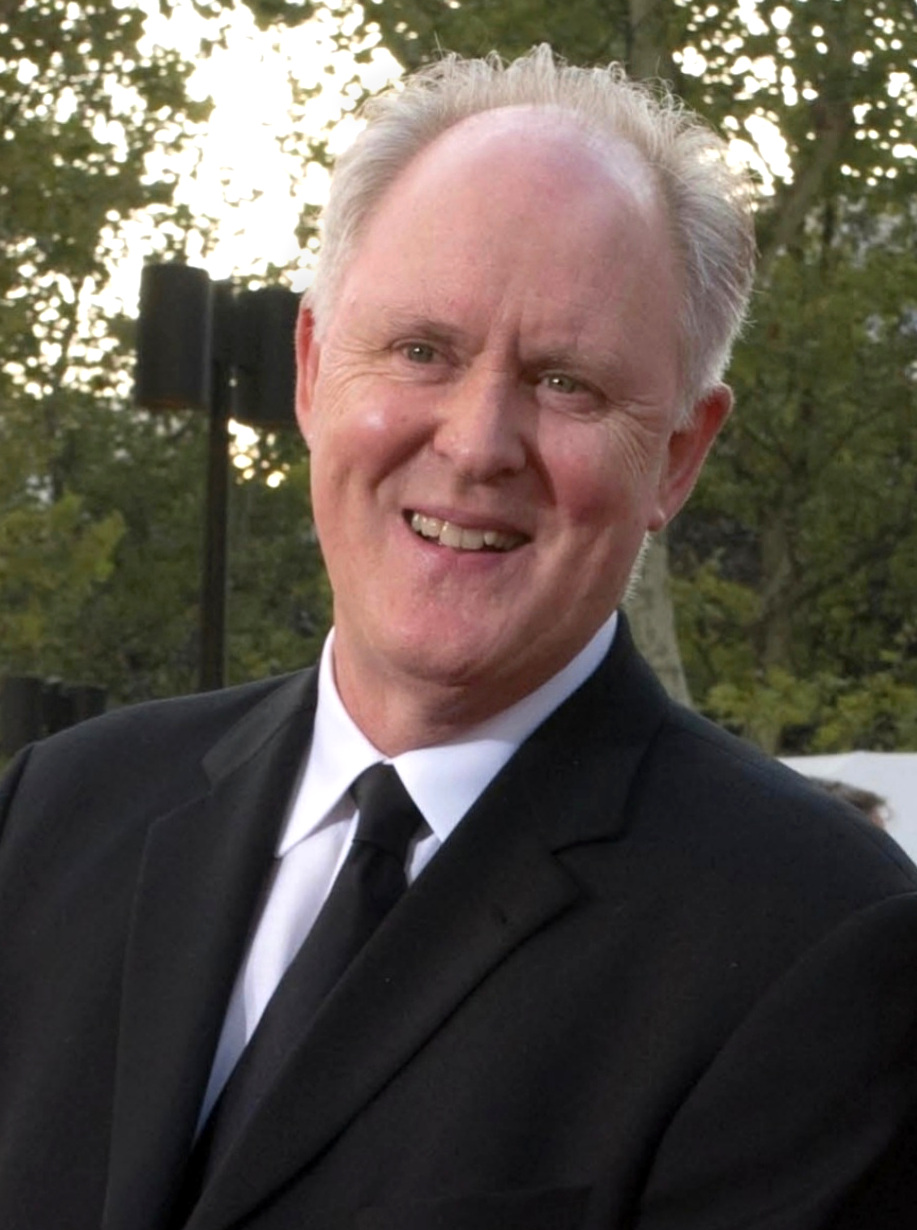
John Lithgow won for 3rd Rock from the Sun in 1996.

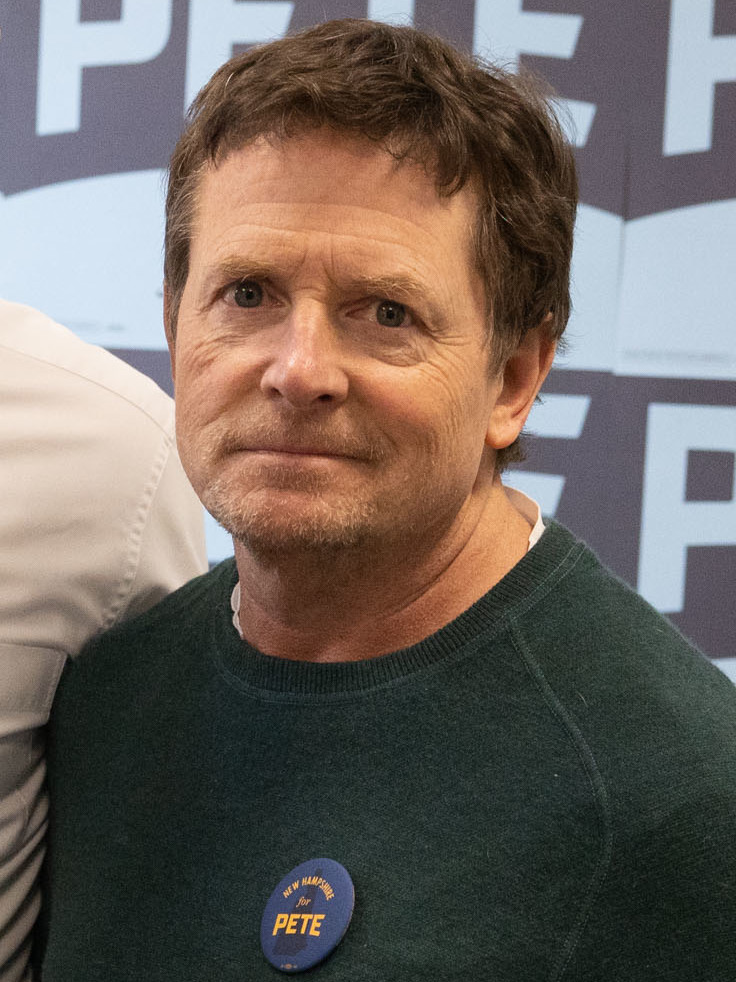
Michael J. Fox won the award three consecutive times for his role on Spin City as well as a fourth award in 1988 for his role on Family Ties.

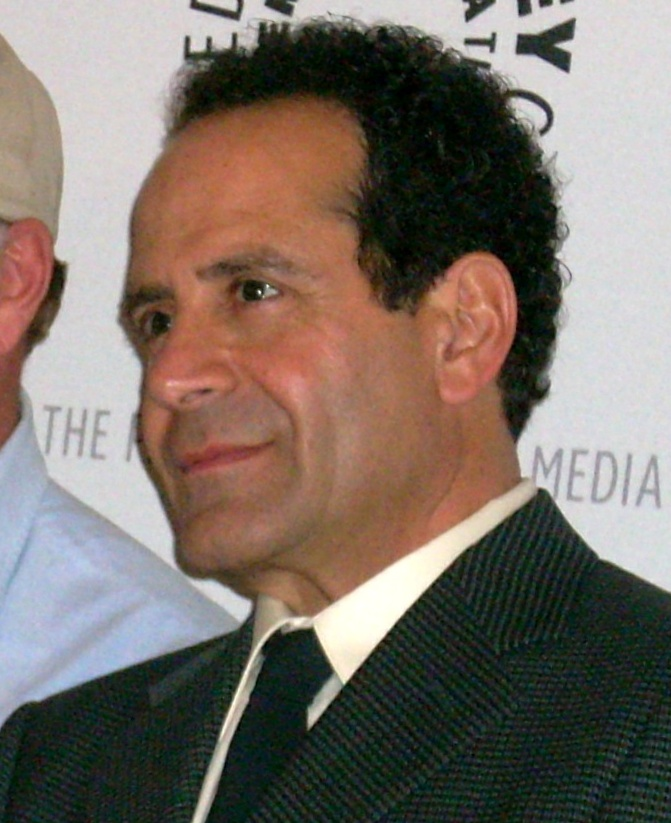
Tony Shalhoub won for Monk in 2002.

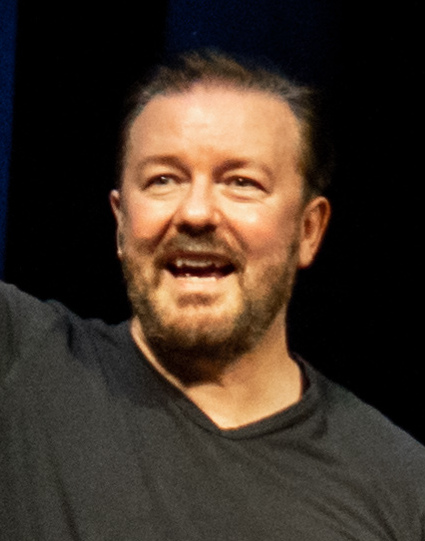
Ricky Gervais won for David Brent on The Office in 2003.

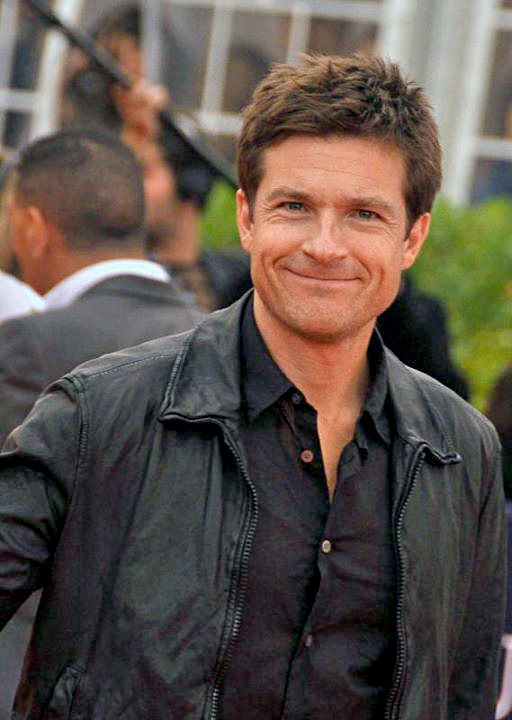
Jason Bateman won for Arrested Development playing Michael Bluth in 2004.

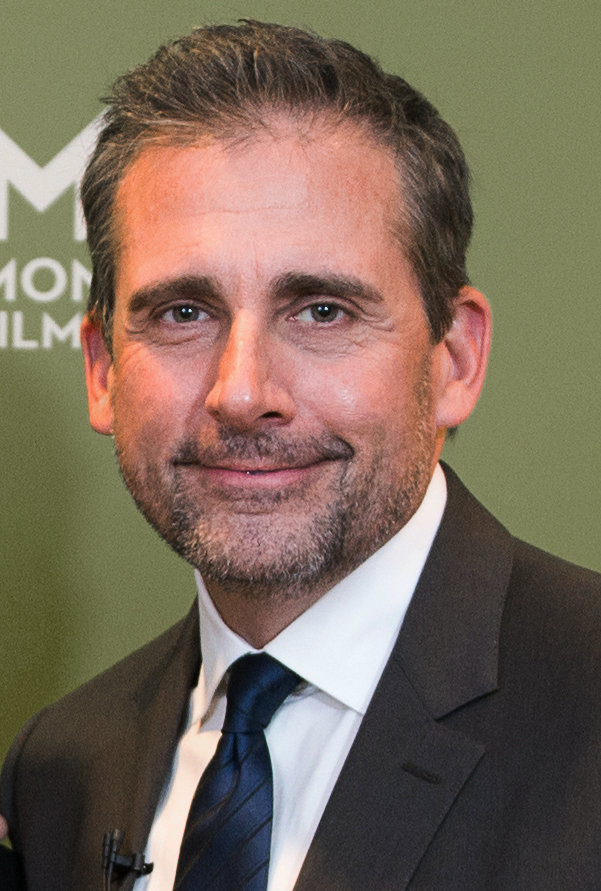
Steve Carell won for Michael Scott in The Office in 2005.

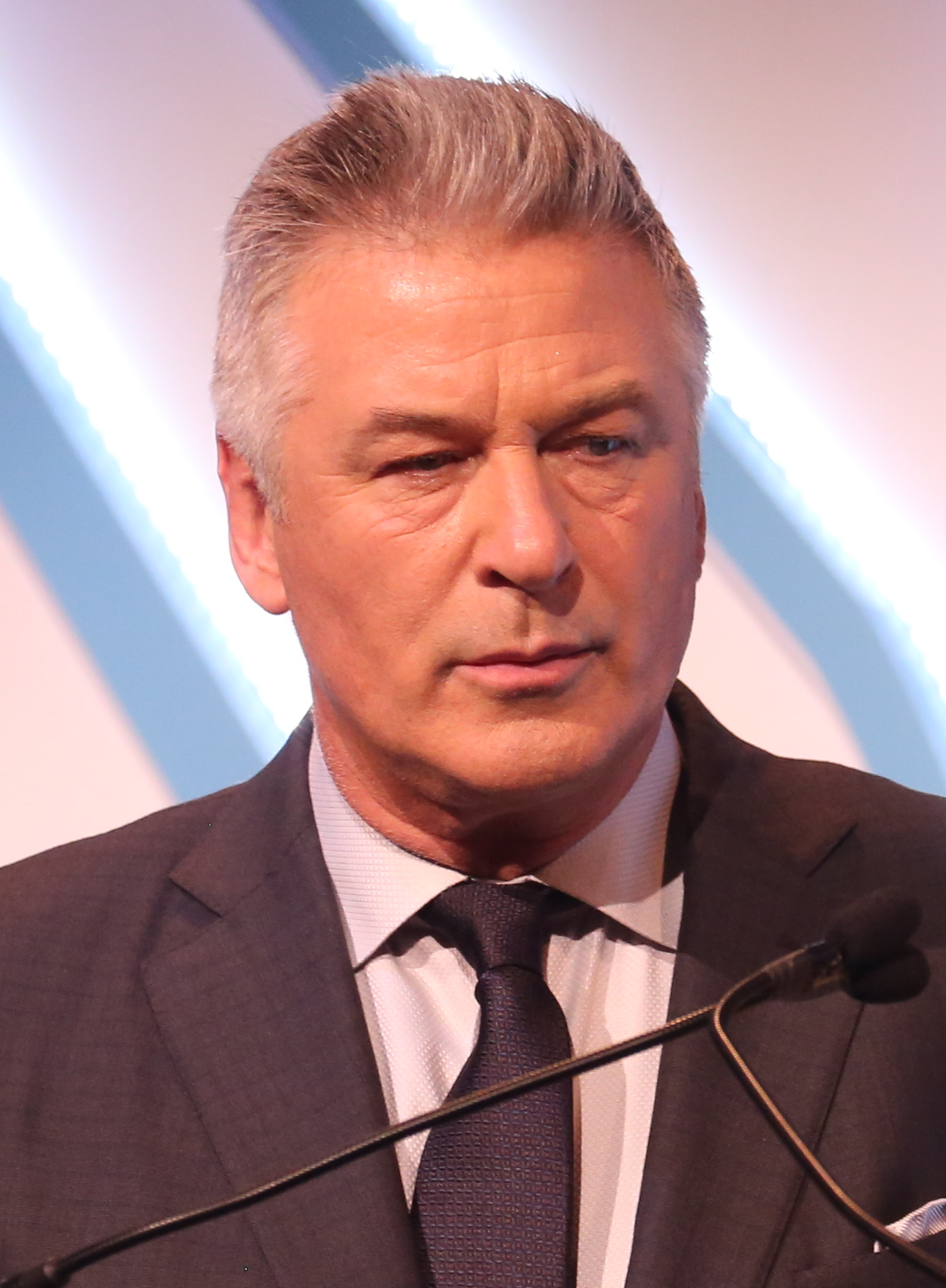
Alec Baldwin won three times for his role on 30 Rock as Jack Donaghy.

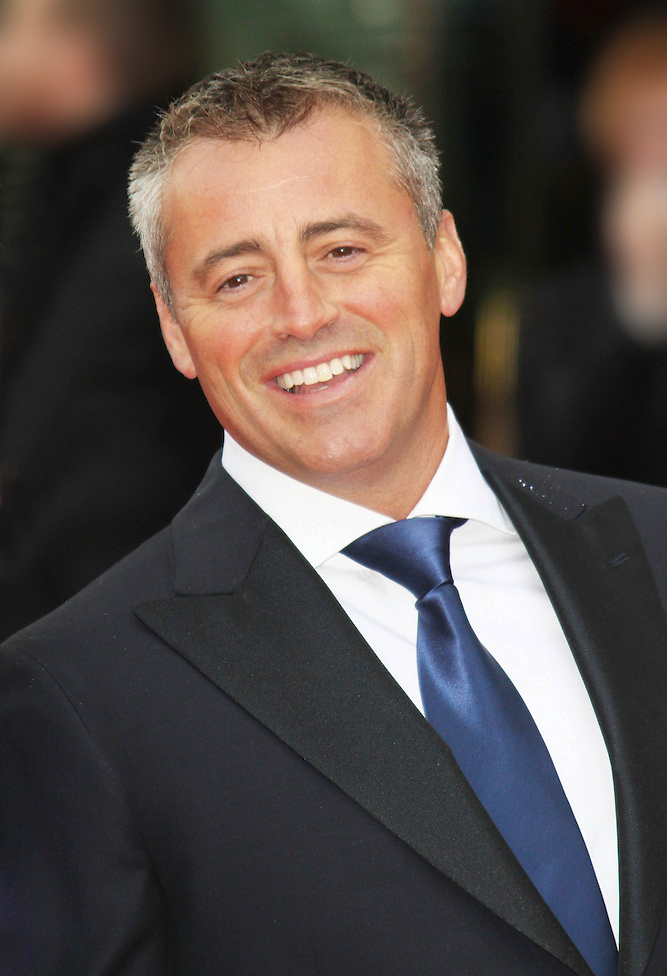
Matt LeBlanc won Episodes in 2011.

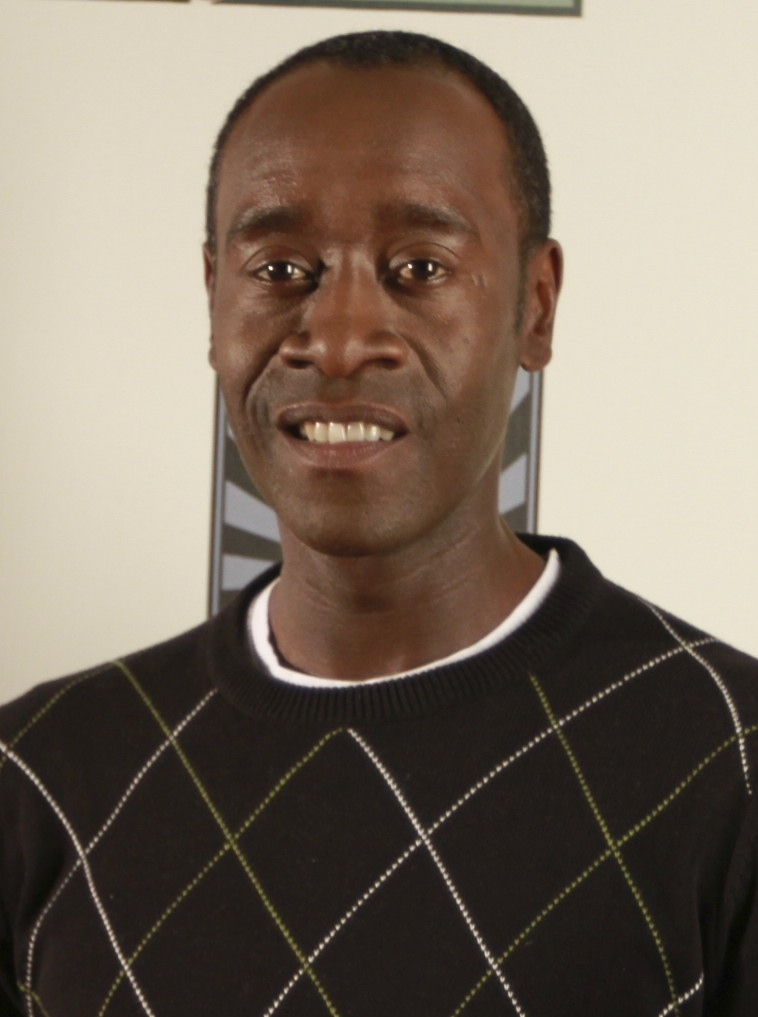
Don Cheadle won for House of Lies in 2012.

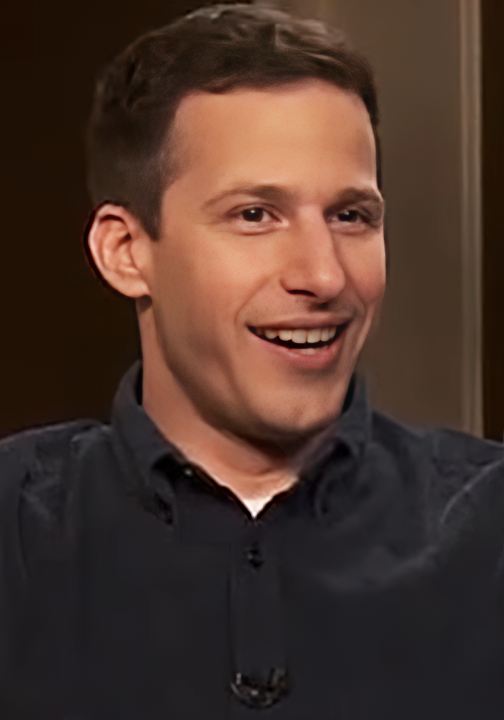
Andy Samberg won for Brooklyn Nine-Nine in 2013.

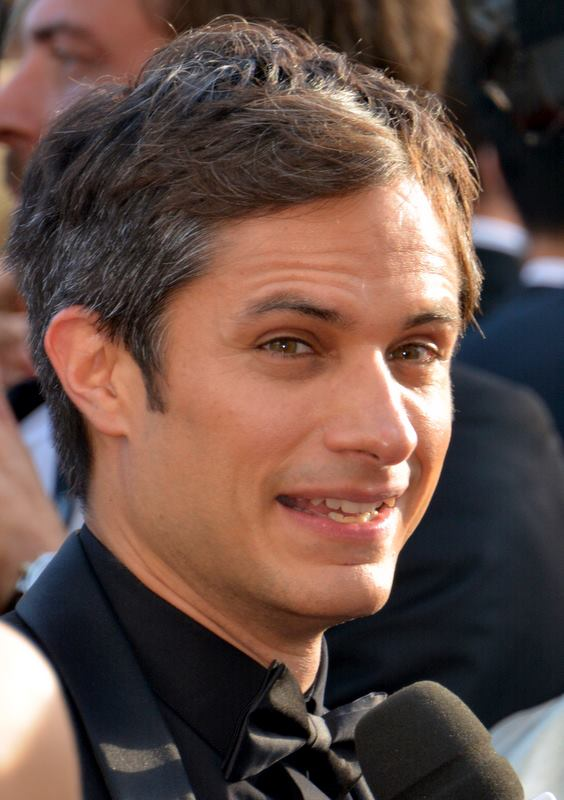
Gael García Bernal won for Mozart in the Jungle in 2015.

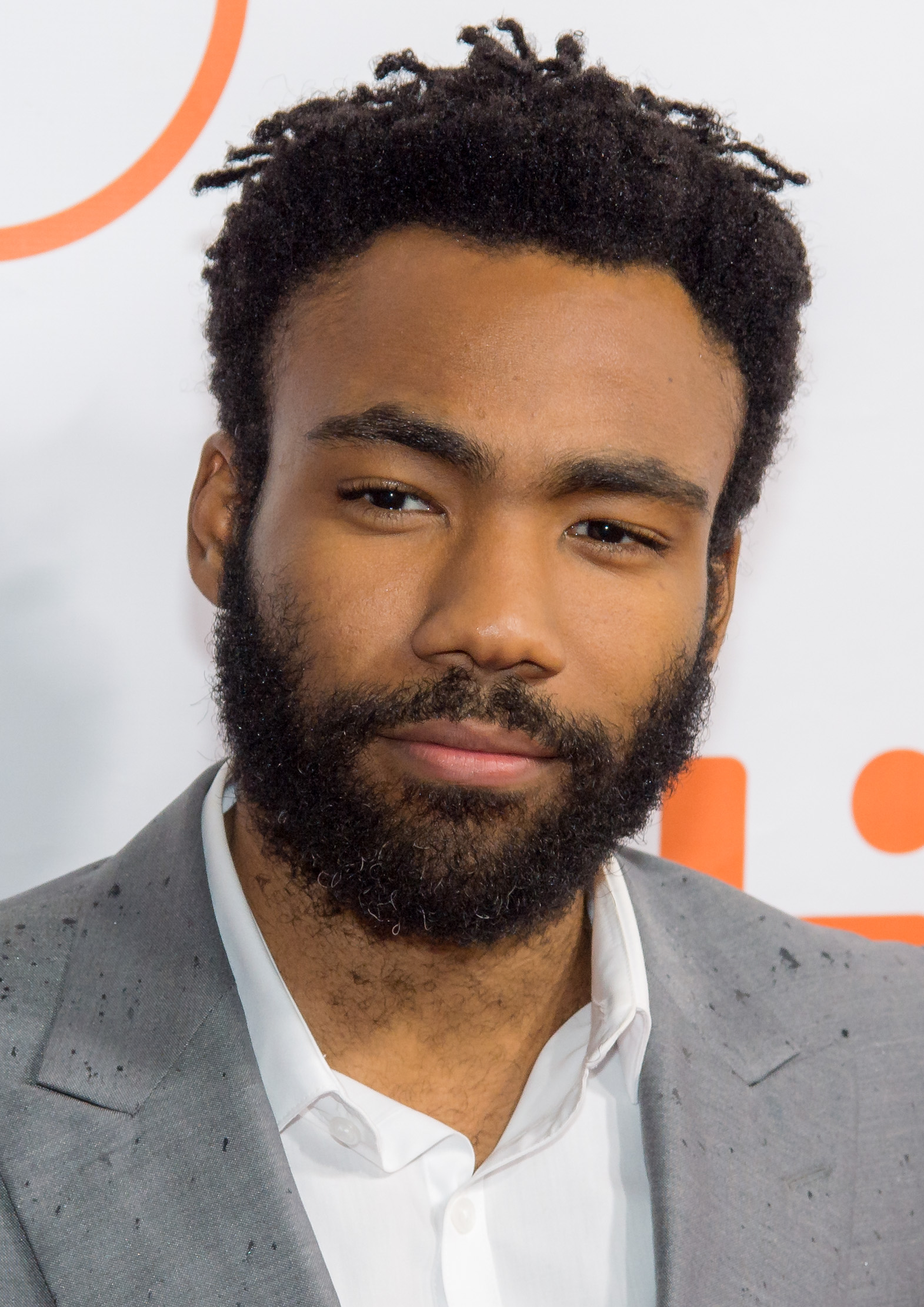
Donald Glover won for Atlanta in 2016.

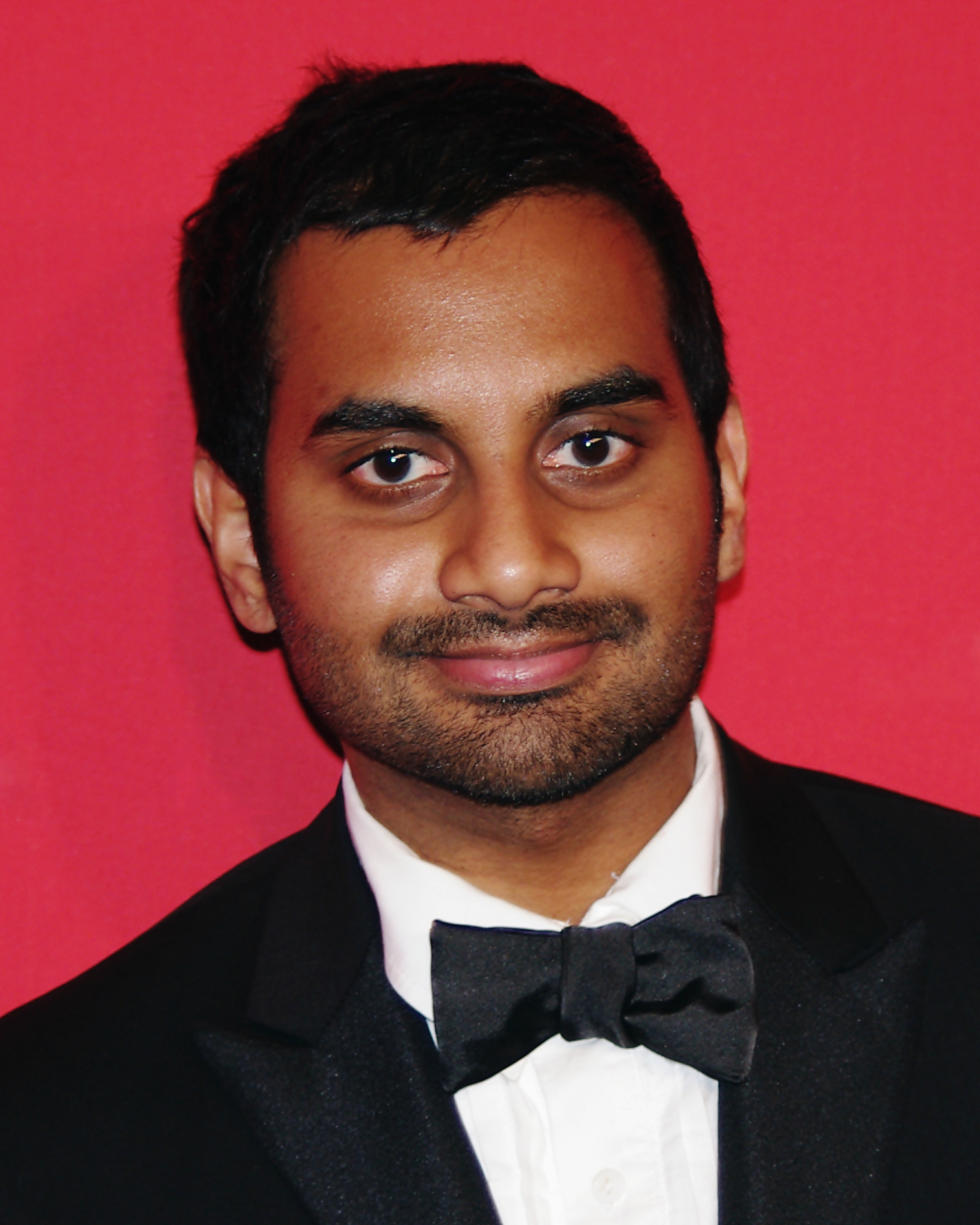
Aziz Ansari won for Master of None in 2017.

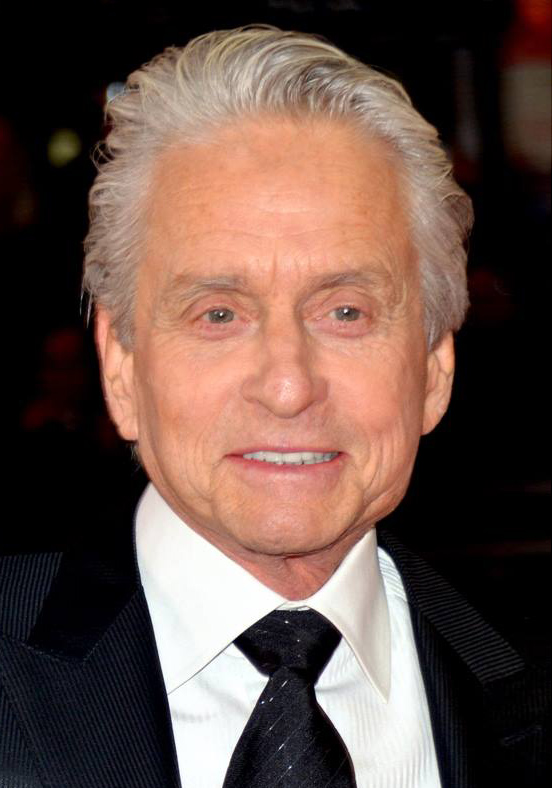
Michael Douglas won for The Kominsky Method in 2018.

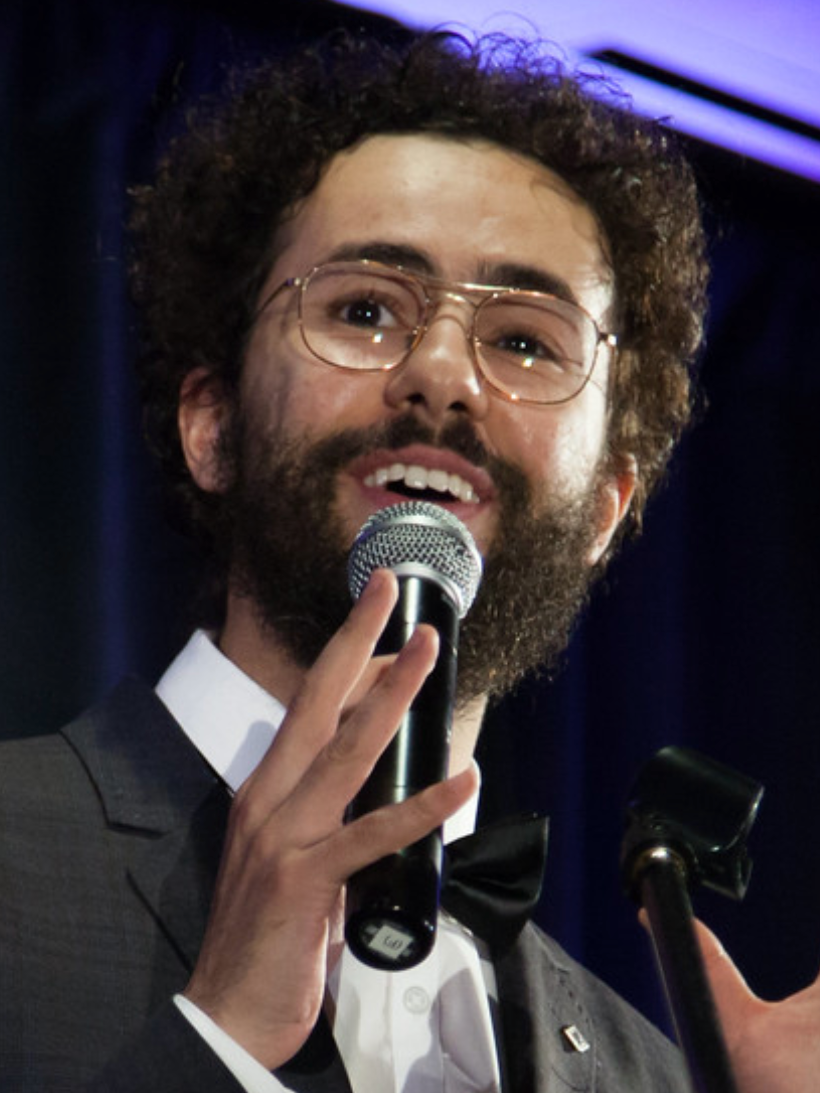
Ramy Youssef won for Ramy in 2019.

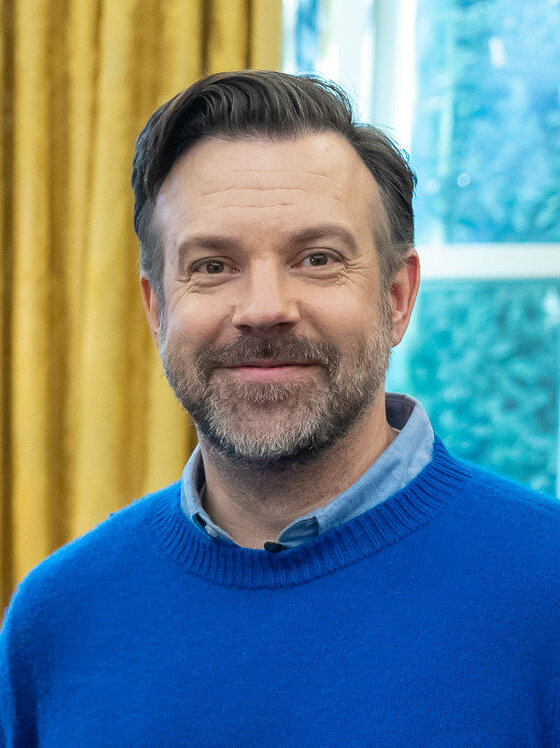
Jason Sudeikis won twice for Ted Lasso.

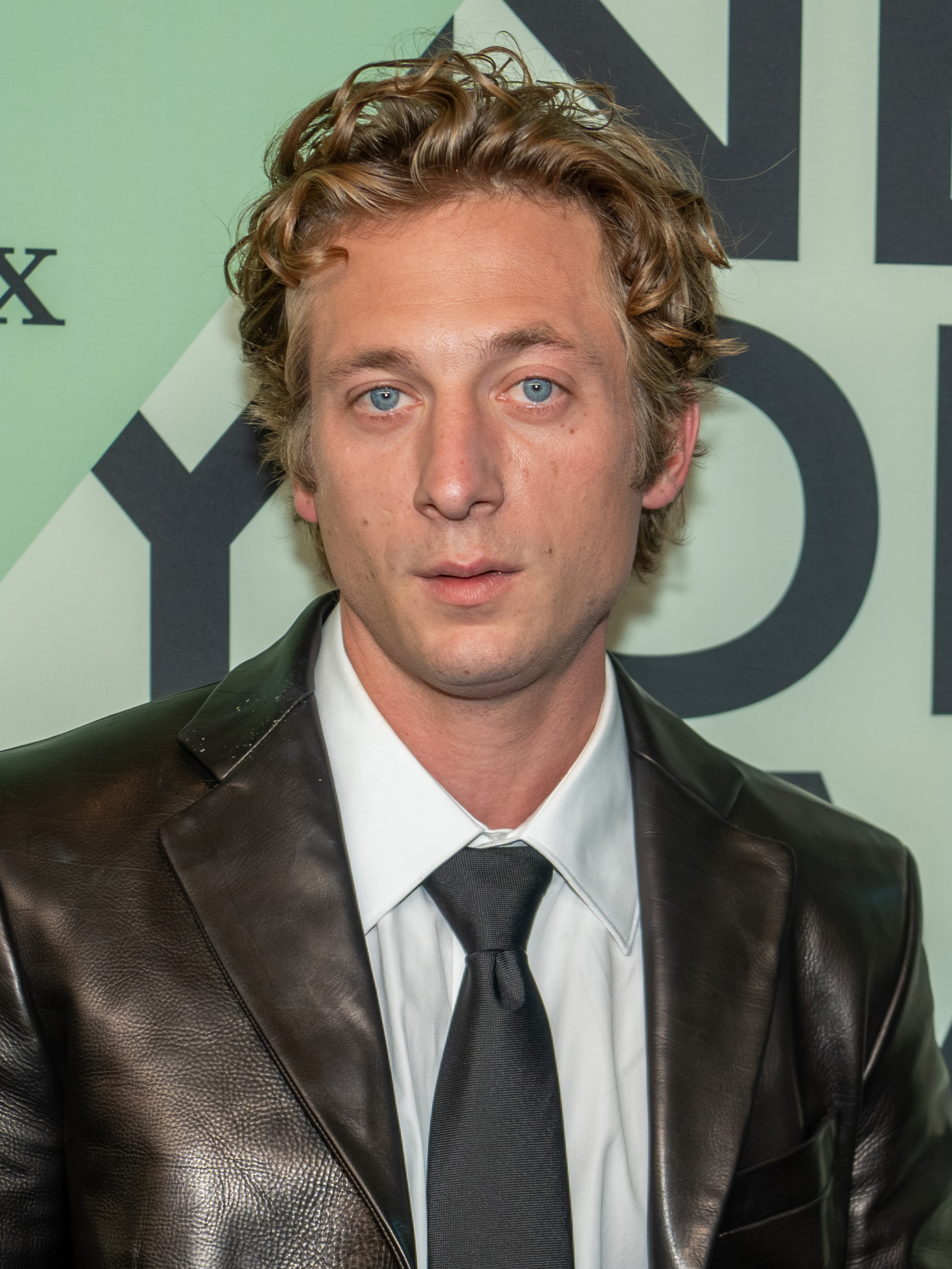
Jeremy Allen White won thrice for The Bear.

=== Best TV Star – Male ===
==== 1960s ====
Year	Actor	Role	Program	Network	Ref
Best TV Star – Male
1961 (19th)
1961 (19th)	John Charles Daly ‡				
1961 (19th)	Bob Newhart ‡				
1962 (20th)
1962 (20th)	Richard Chamberlain ‡	James Kildare	Dr. Kildare	NBC	
1963 (21st)
1963 (21st)	Mickey Rooney ‡	Mickey Grady	Mickey	ABC	
1963 (21st)	Richard Boone	Various Characters	The Richard Boone Show	NBC	
1963 (21st)	Jackie Gleason	Various Characters	American Scene Magazine	CBS	
1963 (21st)	Lorne Greene	Ben Cartwright	Bonanza	NBC	
1963 (21st)	E.G. Marshall	Lawrence Preston	The Defenders	CBS	
1964 (22nd)
1964 (22nd)	Gene Barry ‡	Amos Burke	Burke's Law	ABC	
1964 (22nd)	Richard Crenna	James Slattery	Slattery's People	CBS	
1964 (22nd)	James Franciscus	John Novak	Mr. Novak	NBC	
1964 (22nd)	David Janssen	Richard Kimble	The Fugitive	ABC	
1964 (22nd)	Robert Vaughn	Napoleon Solo	The Man from U.N.C.L.E.	NBC	
1965 (23rd)
1965 (23rd)	David Janssen ‡	Richard Kimble	The Fugitive	ABC	
1965 (23rd)	Ben Gazzara	Paul Bryan	Run for Your Life	NBC	
1965 (23rd)	David McCallum	Illya Kuryakin	The Man from U.N.C.L.E.	NBC	
1965 (23rd)	Robert Vaughn	Napoleon Solo	The Man from U.N.C.L.E.	NBC	
1966 (24th)
1966 (24th)	Dean Martin ‡	Various characters	The Dean Martin Show	NBC	
1966 (24th)	Bill Cosby	Alexander Scott	I Spy	NBC	
1966 (24th)	Robert Culp	Kelly Robinson	I Spy	NBC	
1966 (24th)	Ben Gazzara	Paul Bryan	Run for Your Life	NBC	
1966 (24th)	Christopher George	Sam Troy	The Rat Patrol	ABC	
1967 (25th)
1967 (25th)	Martin Landau ‡	Rollin Hand	Mission: Impossible	CBS	
1967 (25th)	Brendon Boone	Chief	Garrison's Gorillas	ABC	
1967 (25th)	Ben Gazzara	Paul Bryan	Run for Your Life	NBC	
1967 (25th)	Dean Martin	Various characters	The Dean Martin Show	NBC	
1967 (25th)	Andy Williams	Various characters	The Andy Williams Show	NBC	
1968 (26th)
1968 (26th)	Carl Betz ‡	Clinton Judd	Judd, for the Defense	ABC	
1968 (26th)	Raymond Burr	Robert T. Ironside	Ironside	NBC	
1968 (26th)	Peter Graves	Jim Phelps	Mission: Impossible	CBS	
1968 (26th)	Dean Martin	Various characters	The Dean Martin Show	NBC	
1968 (26th)	Efrem Zimbalist Jr.	Lewis Erskine	The F.B.I.	ABC	
Best TV Actor – Musical or Comedy
1969 (27th)
1969 (27th)	Dan Dailey ‡	William Drinkwater	The Governor & J.J.	CBS	
1969 (27th)	Glen Campbell	Himself	The Glen Campbell Goodtime Hour	CBS	
1969 (27th)	Tom Jones	Himself	This Is Tom Jones	ABC	
1969 (27th)	Dean Martin	Himself	The Dean Martin Show	NBC	
1969 (27th)	Jim Nabors	Himself	The Jim Nabors Hour	CBS	

==== 1970s ====
Year	Actor	Role	Program	Network	Ref
1970 (28th)
1970 (28th)	Flip Wilson ‡	Various characters	The Flip Wilson Show	NBC	
1970 (28th)	Herschel Bernardi	Arnie Nuvo	Arnie	CBS	
1970 (28th)	David Frost	Himself	The David Frost Show	Syndicated	
1970 (28th)	Merv Griffin	Himself	The Merv Griffin Show	CBS	
1970 (28th)	Danny Thomas	Danny Williams	Make Room for Granddaddy	ABC	
1971 (29th)
1971 (29th)	Carroll O'Connor ‡	Archie Bunker	All in the Family	CBS	
1971 (29th)	Herschel Bernardi	Arnie Nuvo	Arnie	CBS	
1971 (29th)	Jack Klugman	Oscar Madison	The Odd Couple	ABC	
1971 (29th)	Dick Van Dyke	Dick Preston	The New Dick Van Dyke Show	CBS	
1971 (29th)	Flip Wilson	Various characters	The Flip Wilson Show	NBC	
1972 (30th)
1972 (30th)	Redd Foxx ‡	Fred G. Sanford	Sanford and Son	NBC	
1972 (30th)	Alan Alda	Hawkeye Pierce	M*A*S*H	CBS	
1972 (30th)	Bill Cosby	Various characters	The New Bill Cosby Show	CBS	
1972 (30th)	Paul Lynde	Paul Simms	The Paul Lynde Show	ABC	
1972 (30th)	Carroll O'Connor	Archie Bunker	All in the Family	CBS	
1972 (30th)	Flip Wilson	Various characters	The Flip Wilson Show	NBC	
1973 (31st)
1973 (31st)	Jack Klugman ‡	Oscar Madison	The Odd Couple	ABC	
1973 (31st)	Alan Alda	Hawkeye Pierce	M*A*S*H	CBS	
1973 (31st)	Dom DeLuise	Stanley Belmont	Lotsa Luck	NBC	
1973 (31st)	Redd Foxx	Fred G. Sanford	Sanford and Son	NBC	
1973 (31st)	Carroll O'Connor	Archie Bunker	All in the Family	CBS	
1974 (32nd)
1974 (32nd)	Alan Alda ‡	Hawkeye Pierce	M*A*S*H	CBS	
1974 (32nd)	Ed Asner	Lou Grant	The Mary Tyler Moore Show	CBS	
1974 (32nd)	Redd Foxx	Fred G. Sanford	Sanford and Son	NBC	
1974 (32nd)	Bob Newhart	Robert Hartley, Ph.D.	The Bob Newhart Show	CBS	
1974 (32nd)	Carroll O'Connor	Archie Bunker	All in the Family	CBS	
1975 (33rd)
1975 (33rd)	Alan Alda ‡	Hawkeye Pierce	M*A*S*H	CBS	
1975 (33rd)	Johnny Carson	Various characters	The Tonight Show Starring Johnny Carson	NBC	
1975 (33rd)	Redd Foxx	Fred G. Sanford	Sanford and Son	NBC	
1975 (33rd)	Hal Linden	Captain Barney Miller	Barney Miller	ABC	
1975 (33rd)	Bob Newhart	Robert Hartley, Ph.D.	The Bob Newhart Show	CBS	
1975 (33rd)	Carroll O'Connor	Archie Bunker	All in the Family	CBS	
1976 (34th)
1976 (34th)	Henry Winkler ‡	Fonzie	Happy Days	ABC	
1976 (34th)	Alan Alda	Hawkeye Pierce	M*A*S*H	CBS	
1976 (34th)	Michael Constantine	Judge Matthew Sirota	Sirota's Court	NBC	
1976 (34th)	Sammy Davis Jr.	Various characters	Sammy and Company	Syndicated	
1976 (34th)	Hal Linden	Captain Barney Miller	Barney Miller	ABC	
1976 (34th)	Freddie Prinze	Chico Rodriguez	Chico and the Man	NBC	
1976 (34th)	Tony Randall	Walter Franklin	The Tony Randall Show	ABC	
1977 (35th)
1977 (35th)	Ron Howard ‡	Richie Cunningham	Happy Days	ABC	
1977 (35th)	Henry Winkler ‡	Fonzie	Happy Days	ABC	
1977 (35th)	Alan Alda	Hawkeye Pierce	M*A*S*H	CBS	
1977 (35th)	Hal Linden	Captain Barney Miller	Barney Miller	ABC	
1977 (35th)	Carroll O'Connor	Archie Bunker	All in the Family	CBS	
1978 (36th)
1978 (36th)	Robin Williams ‡	Mork	Mork & Mindy	ABC	
1978 (36th)	Alan Alda	Hawkeye Pierce	M*A*S*H	CBS	
1978 (36th)	Gavin MacLeod	Captain Merrill Stubing	The Love Boat	ABC	
1978 (36th)	Judd Hirsch	Alex Rieger	Taxi	ABC	
1978 (36th)	John Ritter	Jack Tripper	Three's Company	ABC	
1979 (37th)					
1979 (37th)	Alan Alda ‡	Hawkeye Pierce	M*A*S*H	CBS	
1979 (37th)	Judd Hirsch	Alex Rieger	Taxi	ABC	
1979 (37th)	Wilfrid Hyde-White	Emerson Marshall	The Associates	ABC	
1979 (37th)	John Ritter	Jack Tripper	Three's Company	ABC	
1979 (37th)	Robin Williams	Mork	Mork & Mindy	ABC	

=== Best Actor – Television Series Musical or Comedy ===
==== 1980s ====
Year	Actor	Role	Program	Network	Ref
1980 (38th)
1980 (38th)	Alan Alda ‡	Hawkeye Pierce	M*A*S*H	CBS	
1980 (38th)	Judd Hirsch	Alex Reiger	Taxi	ABC	
1980 (38th)	Hal Linden	Barney Miller	Barney Miller	ABC	
1980 (38th)	Gavin MacLeod	Merrill Stubing	The Love Boat	ABC	
1980 (38th)	Wayne Rogers	Charley Michaels	House Calls	CBS	
1981 (39th)
1981 (39th)	Alan Alda ‡	Hawkeye Pierce	M*A*S*H	CBS	
1981 (39th)	James Garner	Bret Maverick	Bret Maverick	NBC	
1981 (39th)	Judd Hirsch	Alex Reiger	Taxi	ABC	
1981 (39th)	Gavin MacLeod	Merrill Stubing	The Love Boat	ABC	
1981 (39th)	Tony Randall	Sidney Shore	Love, Sidney	NBC	
1982 (40th)
1982 (40th)	Alan Alda ‡	Hawkeye Pierce	M*A*S*H	CBS	
1982 (40th)	Robert Guillaume	Benson DuBois	Benson	ABC	
1982 (40th)	Judd Hirsch	Alex Reiger	Taxi	ABC	
1982 (40th)	Bob Newhart	Dick Loudon	Newhart	CBS	
1982 (40th)	Tony Randall	Sidney Shore	Love, Sidney	NBC	
1983 (41st)
1983 (41st)	John Ritter ‡	Jack Tripper	Three's Company	ABC	
1983 (41st)	Dabney Coleman	Bill Bittinger	Buffalo Bill	NBC	
1983 (41st)	Ted Danson	Sam Malone	Cheers	NBC	
1983 (41st)	Robert Guillaume	Benson DuBois	Benson	ABC	
1983 (41st)	Bob Newhart	Dick Loudon	Newhart	CBS	
1984 (42nd)
1984 (42nd)	Bill Cosby ‡	Cliff Huxtable	The Cosby Show	NBC	
1984 (42nd)	Ted Danson	Sam Malone	Cheers	NBC	
1984 (42nd)	Robert Guillaume	Benson DuBois	Benson	ABC	
1984 (42nd)	Sherman Hemsley	George Jefferson	The Jeffersons	CBS	
1984 (42nd)	Bob Newhart	Dick Loudon	Newhart	CBS	
1985 (43rd)
1985 (43rd)	Bill Cosby ‡	Cliff Huxtable	The Cosby Show	NBC	
1985 (43rd)	Tony Danza	Tony Micelli	Who's the Boss?	ABC	
1985 (43rd)	Michael J. Fox	Alex P. Keaton	Family Ties	NBC	
1985 (43rd)	Bob Newhart	Dick Loudon	Newhart	CBS	
1985 (43rd)	Bruce Willis	David Addison	Moonlighting	ABC	
1986 (44th)
1986 (44th)	Bruce Willis ‡	David Addison	Moonlighting	ABC	
1986 (44th)	Bill Cosby	Cliff Huxtable	The Cosby Show	NBC	
1986 (44th)	Ted Danson	Sam Malone	Cheers	NBC	
1986 (44th)	Tony Danza	Tony Micelli	Who's the Boss?	ABC	
1986 (44th)	Michael J. Fox	Alex P. Keaton	Family Ties	NBC	
1987 (45th)
1987 (45th)	Dabney Coleman ‡	Slap Maxwell	The Slap Maxwell Story	ABC	
1987 (45th)	Michael J. Fox	Alex P. Keaton	Family Ties	NBC	
1987 (45th)	John Ritter	Det. Harry Hooperman	Hooperman	ABC	
1987 (45th)	Alan Thicke	Jason Seaver	Growing Pains	ABC	
1987 (45th)	Bruce Willis	David Addison	Moonlighting	ABC	
1988 (46th)
1988 (46th)	Michael J. Fox ‡	Alex P. Keaton	Family Ties	NBC	
1988 (46th)	Judd Hirsch ‡	John Lacey	Dear John	NBC	
1988 (46th)	Richard Mulligan ‡	Harry Weston	Empty Nest	NBC	
1988 (46th)	Ted Danson	Sam Malone	Cheers	NBC	
1988 (46th)	John Goodman	Dan Conner	Roseanne	ABC	
1989 (47th)
1989 (47th)	Ted Danson ‡	Sam Malone	Cheers	NBC	
1989 (47th)	John Goodman	Dan Conner	Roseanne	ABC	
1989 (47th)	Judd Hirsch	John Lacey	Dear John	NBC	
1989 (47th)	Richard Mulligan	Harry Weston	Empty Nest	NBC	
1989 (47th)	Fred Savage	Kevin Arnold	The Wonder Years	ABC	

==== 1990s ====
Year	Actor	Role	Program	Network	Ref
1990 (48th)
1990 (48th)	Ted Danson ‡	Sam Malone	Cheers	NBC	
1990 (48th)	John Goodman	Dan Conner	Roseanne	ABC	
1990 (48th)	Richard Mulligan	Harry Weston	Empty Nest	NBC	
1990 (48th)	Burt Reynolds	Wood Newton	Evening Shade	CBS	
1990 (48th)	Fred Savage	Kevin Arnold	The Wonder Years	ABC	
1991 (49th)
1991 (49th)	Burt Reynolds ‡	Wood Newton	Evening Shade	CBS	
1991 (49th)	Ted Danson	Sam Malone	Cheers	NBC	
1991 (49th)	Neil Patrick Harris	Doogie Howser	Doogie Howser, M.D.	ABC	
1991 (49th)	Craig T. Nelson	Hayden Fox	Coach	ABC	
1991 (49th)	Ed O'Neill	Al Bundy	Married... with Children	Fox	
1992 (50th)
1992 (50th)	John Goodman ‡	Dan Conner	Roseanne	ABC	
1992 (50th)	Tim Allen	Tim Taylor	Home Improvement	ABC	
1992 (50th)	Ted Danson	Sam Malone	Cheers	NBC	
1992 (50th)	Craig T. Nelson	Hayden Fox	Coach	ABC	
1992 (50th)	Ed O'Neill	Al Bundy	Married... with Children	Fox	
1992 (50th)	Burt Reynolds	Wood Newton	Evening Shade	CBS	
1992 (50th)	Will Smith	Will Smith	The Fresh Prince of Bel-Air	NBC	
1993 (51st)
1993 (51st)	Jerry Seinfeld ‡	Jerry Seinfeld	Seinfeld	NBC	
1993 (51st)	Tim Allen	Tim Taylor	Home Improvement	ABC	
1993 (51st)	Kelsey Grammer	Frasier Crane	Frasier	NBC	
1993 (51st)	Craig T. Nelson	Hayden Fox	Coach	ABC	
1993 (51st)	Will Smith	Will Smith	The Fresh Prince of Bel-Air	NBC	
1994 (52nd)
1994 (52nd)	Tim Allen ‡	Tim Taylor	Home Improvement	ABC	
1994 (52nd)	Kelsey Grammer	Frasier Crane	Frasier	NBC	
1994 (52nd)	Craig T. Nelson	Hayden Fox	Coach	ABC	
1994 (52nd)	Paul Reiser	Paul Buchman	Mad About You	NBC	
1994 (52nd)	Jerry Seinfeld	Jerry Seinfeld	Seinfeld	NBC	
1994 (52nd)	Garry Shandling	Larry Sanders	The Larry Sanders Show	HBO	
1995 (53rd)
1995 (53rd)	Kelsey Grammer ‡	Frasier Crane	Frasier	NBC	
1995 (53rd)	Tim Allen	Tim Taylor	Home Improvement	ABC	
1995 (53rd)	Paul Reiser	Paul Buchman	Mad About You	NBC	
1995 (53rd)	Jerry Seinfeld	Jerry Seinfeld	Seinfeld	NBC	
1995 (53rd)	Garry Shandling	Larry Sanders	The Larry Sanders Show	HBO	
1996 (54th)
1996 (54th)	John Lithgow ‡	Dick Solomon	3rd Rock from the Sun	NBC	
1996 (54th)	Tim Allen	Tim Taylor	Home Improvement	ABC	
1996 (54th)	Michael J. Fox	Mike Flaherty	Spin City	ABC	
1996 (54th)	Kelsey Grammer	Frasier Crane	Frasier	NBC	
1996 (54th)	Paul Reiser	Paul Buchman	Mad About You	NBC	
1997 (55th)
1997 (55th)	Michael J. Fox ‡	Mike Flaherty	Spin City	ABC	
1997 (55th)	Kelsey Grammer	Frasier Crane	Frasier	NBC	
1997 (55th)	John Lithgow	Dick Solomon	3rd Rock from the Sun	NBC	
1997 (55th)	Paul Reiser	Paul Buchman	Mad About You	NBC	
1997 (55th)	Jerry Seinfeld	Jerry Seinfeld	Seinfeld	NBC	
1998 (56th)
1998 (56th)	Michael J. Fox ‡	Mike Flaherty	Spin City	ABC	
1998 (56th)	Thomas Gibson	Greg Montgomery	Dharma & Greg	ABC	
1998 (56th)	Kelsey Grammer	Frasier Crane	Frasier	NBC	
1998 (56th)	John Lithgow	Dick Solomon	3rd Rock from the Sun	NBC	
1998 (56th)	George Segal	Jack Gallo	Just Shoot Me!	NBC	
1999 (57th)
1999 (57th)	Michael J. Fox ‡	Mike Flaherty	Spin City	ABC	
1999 (57th)	Thomas Gibson	Greg Montgomery	Dharma & Greg	ABC	
1999 (57th)	Eric McCormack	Will Truman	Will & Grace	NBC	
1999 (57th)	Ray Romano	Raymond Barone	Everybody Loves Raymond	CBS	
1999 (57th)	George Segal	Jack Gallo	Just Shoot Me!	NBC	

==== 2000s ====
Year	Actor	Role	Program	Network	Ref
2000 (58th)
2000 (58th)	Kelsey Grammer ‡	Frasier Crane	Frasier	NBC	
2000 (58th)	Ted Danson	John Becker	Becker	CBS	
2000 (58th)	Eric McCormack	Will Truman	Will & Grace	NBC	
2000 (58th)	Frankie Muniz	Malcolm Wilkerson	Malcolm in the Middle	Fox	
2000 (58th)	Ray Romano	Raymond Barone	Everybody Loves Raymond	CBS	
2001 (59th)
2001 (59th)	Charlie Sheen ‡	Charlie Crawford	Spin City	ABC	
2001 (59th)	Tom Cavanagh	Ed Stevens	Ed	NBC	
2001 (59th)	Kelsey Grammer	Frasier Crane	Frasier	NBC	
2001 (59th)	Eric McCormack	Will Truman	Will & Grace	NBC	
2001 (59th)	Frankie Muniz	Malcolm Wilkerson	Malcolm in the Middle	Fox	
2002 (60th)
2002 (60th)	Tony Shalhoub ‡	Adrian Monk	Monk	USA	
2002 (60th)	Larry David	Himself	Curb Your Enthusiasm	HBO	
2002 (60th)	Matt LeBlanc	Joey Tribbiani	Friends	NBC	
2002 (60th)	Bernie Mac	Bernie McCullough	The Bernie Mac Show	Fox	
2002 (60th)	Eric McCormack	Will Truman	Will & Grace	NBC	
2003 (61st)
2003 (61st)	Ricky Gervais ‡	David Brent	The Office	BBC	
2003 (61st)	Matt LeBlanc	Joey Tribbiani	Friends	NBC	
2003 (61st)	Bernie Mac	Bernie McCullough	The Bernie Mac Show	Fox	
2003 (61st)	Eric McCormack	Will Truman	Will & Grace	NBC	
2003 (61st)	Tony Shalhoub	Adrian Monk	Monk	USA	
2004 (62nd)
2004 (62nd)	Jason Bateman ‡	Michael Bluth	Arrested Development	Fox	
2004 (62nd)	Zach Braff	John "J.D." Dorian	Scrubs	NBC	
2004 (62nd)	Larry David	Himself	Curb Your Enthusiasm	HBO	
2004 (62nd)	Matt LeBlanc	Joey Tribbiani	Joey	NBC	
2004 (62nd)	Tony Shalhoub	Adrian Monk	Monk	USA	
2004 (62nd)	Charlie Sheen	Charlie Harper	Two and a Half Men	CBS	
2005 (63rd)
2005 (63rd)	Steve Carell ‡	Michael Scott	The Office	NBC	
2005 (63rd)	Zach Braff	John "J.D." Dorian	Scrubs	NBC	
2005 (63rd)	Larry David	Himself	Curb Your Enthusiasm	HBO	
2005 (63rd)	Jason Lee	Earl Hickey	My Name Is Earl	NBC	
2005 (63rd)	Charlie Sheen	Charlie Harper	Two and a Half Men	CBS	
2006 (64th)
2006 (64th)	Alec Baldwin ‡	Jack Donaghy	30 Rock	NBC	
2006 (64th)	Zach Braff	John "J.D." Dorian	Scrubs	NBC	
2006 (64th)	Steve Carell	Michael Scott	The Office	NBC	
2006 (64th)	Jason Lee	Earl Hickey	My Name Is Earl	NBC	
2006 (64th)	Tony Shalhoub	Adrian Monk	Monk	USA	
2007 (65th)
2007 (65th)	David Duchovny ‡	Hank Moody	Californication	Showtime	
2007 (65th)	Alec Baldwin	Jack Donaghy	30 Rock	NBC	
2007 (65th)	Steve Carell	Michael Scott	The Office	NBC	
2007 (65th)	Ricky Gervais	Andy Millman	Extras	HBO	
2007 (65th)	Lee Pace	Ned	Pushing Daisies	ABC	
2008 (66th)
2008 (66th)	Alec Baldwin ‡	Jack Donaghy	30 Rock	NBC	
2008 (66th)	Steve Carell	Michael Scott	The Office	NBC	
2008 (66th)	Kevin Connolly	Eric Murphy	Entourage	HBO	
2008 (66th)	David Duchovny	Hank Moody	Californication	Showtime	
2008 (66th)	Tony Shalhoub	Adrian Monk	Monk	USA	
2009 (67th)
2009 (67th)	Alec Baldwin ‡	Jack Donaghy	30 Rock	NBC	
2009 (67th)	Steve Carell	Michael Scott	The Office	NBC	
2009 (67th)	David Duchovny	Hank Moody	Californication	Showtime	
2009 (67th)	Thomas Jane	Ray Drecker	Hung	HBO	
2009 (67th)	Matthew Morrison	Will Schuester	Glee	Fox	

==== 2010s ====
Year	Actor	Role	Program	Network	Ref
2010 (68th)
2010 (68th)	Jim Parsons ‡	Sheldon Cooper	The Big Bang Theory	CBS	
2010 (68th)	Alec Baldwin	Jack Donaghy	30 Rock	NBC	
2010 (68th)	Steve Carell	Michael Scott	The Office	NBC	
2010 (68th)	Thomas Jane	Ray Drecker	Hung	HBO	
2010 (68th)	Matthew Morrison	Will Schuester	Glee	Fox	
2011 (69th)
2011 (69th)	Matt LeBlanc ‡	Matt LeBlanc	Episodes	Showtime	
2011 (69th)	Alec Baldwin	Jack Donaghy	30 Rock	NBC	
2011 (69th)	David Duchovny	Hank Moody	Californication	Showtime	
2011 (69th)	Johnny Galecki	Leonard Hofstadter	The Big Bang Theory	CBS	
2011 (69th)	Thomas Jane	Ray Drecker	Hung	HBO	
2012 (70th)
2012 (70th)	Don Cheadle ‡	Marty Kaan	House of Lies	Showtime	
2012 (70th)	Alec Baldwin	Jack Donaghy	30 Rock	NBC	
2012 (70th)	Louis C.K.	Louie	Louie	FX	
2012 (70th)	Matt LeBlanc	Matt LeBlanc	Episodes	Showtime	
2012 (70th)	Jim Parsons	Sheldon Cooper	The Big Bang Theory	CBS	
2013 (71st)
2013 (71st)	Andy Samberg ‡	Jake Peralta	Brooklyn Nine-Nine	Fox	
2013 (71st)	Jason Bateman	Michael Bluth	Arrested Development	Netflix	
2013 (71st)	Don Cheadle	Marty Kaan	House of Lies	Showtime	
2013 (71st)	Michael J. Fox	Mike Henry	The Michael J. Fox Show	NBC	
2013 (71st)	Jim Parsons	Sheldon Cooper	The Big Bang Theory	CBS	
2014 (72nd)
2014 (72nd)	Jeffrey Tambor ‡	Maura Pfefferman	Transparent	Amazon Prime Video	
2014 (72nd)	Louis C.K.	Louie	Louie	FX	
2014 (72nd)	Don Cheadle	Marty Kaan	House of Lies	Showtime	
2014 (72nd)	Ricky Gervais	Derek Noakes	Derek	Netflix	
2014 (72nd)	William H. Macy	Frank Gallagher	Shameless	Showtime	
2015 (73rd)
2015 (73rd)	Gael García Bernal ‡	Rodrigo De Souza	Mozart in the Jungle	Prime Video	
2015 (73rd)	Aziz Ansari	Dev Shah	Master of None	Netflix	
2015 (73rd)	Rob Lowe	Dean Sanderson Jr.	The Grinder	Fox	
2015 (73rd)	Patrick Stewart	Walter Blunt	Blunt Talk	Starz	
2015 (73rd)	Jeffrey Tambor	Maura Pfefferman	Transparent	Prime Video	
2016 (74th)
2016 (74th)	Donald Glover ‡	Earnest "Earn" Marks	Atlanta	FX	
2016 (74th)	Anthony Anderson	Andre "Dre" Johnson Sr.	Black-ish	ABC	
2016 (74th)	Gael García Bernal	Rodrigo De Souza	Mozart in the Jungle	Prime Video	
2016 (74th)	Nick Nolte	Richard Graves	Graves	Epix	
2016 (74th)	Jeffrey Tambor	Maura Pfefferman	Transparent	Prime Video	
2017 (75th)
2017 (75th)	Aziz Ansari ‡	Dev Shah	Master of None	Netflix	
2017 (75th)	Anthony Anderson	Andre "Dre" Johnson Sr.	Black-ish	ABC	
2017 (75th)	Kevin Bacon	Dick	I Love Dick	Prime Video	
2017 (75th)	William H. Macy	Frank Gallagher	Shameless	Showtime	
2017 (75th)	Eric McCormack	Will Truman	Will & Grace	NBC	
2018 (76th)	Michael Douglas ‡	Sandy Kominsky	The Kominsky Method	Netflix	
2018 (76th)	Jim Carrey	Jeff Piccirillo	Kidding	Showtime	
2018 (76th)	Sacha Baron Cohen	Various Characters	Who Is America?	Showtime	
2018 (76th)	Donald Glover	Earnest "Earn" Marks	Atlanta	FX	
2018 (76th)	Bill Hader	Barry Berkman / Barry Block	Barry	HBO	
2019 (77th)	Ramy Youssef ‡	Ramy Hassan	Ramy	Hulu	
2019 (77th)	Michael Douglas	Sandy Kominsky	The Kominsky Method	Netflix	
2019 (77th)	Bill Hader	Barry Berkman / Barry Block	Barry	HBO	
2019 (77th)	Ben Platt	Payton Hobart	The Politician	Netflix	
2019 (77th)	Paul Rudd	Miles Elliot / Miles Elliot's Clone	Living with Yourself	Netflix	

==== 2020s ====
Year	Actor	Role	Program	Network	Ref
2020 (78th)	Jason Sudeikis ‡	Ted Lasso	Ted Lasso	Apple TV+	
2020 (78th)	Don Cheadle	Maurice Monroe	Black Monday	Showtime	
2020 (78th)	Nicholas Hoult	Peter III of Russia	The Great	Hulu	
2020 (78th)	Eugene Levy	Johnny Rose	Schitt's Creek	Pop TV	
2020 (78th)	Ramy Youssef	Ramy Hassan	Ramy	Hulu	
2021 (79th)	Jason Sudeikis ‡	Ted Lasso	Ted Lasso	Apple TV+	
2021 (79th)	Anthony Anderson	Andre "Dre" Johnson Sr.	Black-ish	ABC	
2021 (79th)	Nicholas Hoult	Peter III of Russia	The Great	Hulu	
2021 (79th)	Steve Martin	Charles Haden-Savage	Only Murders in the Building	Hulu	
2021 (79th)	Martin Short	Oliver Putnam	Only Murders in the Building	Hulu	
2022 (80th)	Jeremy Allen White ‡	Carmen 'Carmy' Berzatto	The Bear	FX	
2022 (80th)	Donald Glover	Earnest "Earn" Marks	Atlanta	FX	
2022 (80th)	Bill Hader	Barry Berkman / Barry Block	Barry	HBO	
2022 (80th)	Steve Martin	Charles-Haden Savage	Only Murders in the Building	Hulu	
2022 (80th)	Martin Short	Oliver Putnam	Only Murders in the Building	Hulu	
2023 (81st)	Jeremy Allen White ‡	Carmen "Carmy" Berzatto	The Bear	FX	
2023 (81st)	Bill Hader	Barry Berkman	Barry	HBO	
2023 (81st)	Steve Martin	Charles-Haden Savage	Only Murders in the Building	Hulu	
2023 (81st)	Jason Segel	Jimmy Laird	Shrinking	Apple TV+	
2023 (81st)	Martin Short	Oliver Putnam	Only Murders in the Building	Hulu	
2023 (81st)	Jason Sudeikis	Ted Lasso	Ted Lasso	Apple TV+	
2024 (82nd)	Jeremy Allen White ‡	Carmen "Carmy" Berzatto	The Bear	FX	
2024 (82nd)	Adam Brody	Noah Roklov	Nobody Wants This	Netflix	
2024 (82nd)	Ted Danson	Charles Nieuwendyck	A Man on the Inside	Netflix	
2024 (82nd)	Steve Martin	Charles-Haden Savage	Only Murders in the Building	Hulu	
2024 (82nd)	Jason Segel	Jimmy Laird	Shrinking	Apple TV+	
2024 (82nd)	Martin Short	Oliver Putnam	Only Murders in the Building	Hulu	
2025 (83rd)
2025 (83rd)	Seth Rogen ‡	Matt Remick	The Studio	Apple TV+	
2025 (83rd)	Adam Brody	Noah Roklov	Nobody Wants This	Netflix	
2025 (83rd)	Steve Martin	Charles-Haden Savage	Only Murders in the Building	Hulu	
2025 (83rd)	Glen Powell	Russ Holliday / Chad Powers	Chad Powers	Hulu	
2025 (83rd)	Martin Short	Oliver Putnam	Only Murders in the Building	Hulu	
2025 (83rd)	Jeremy Allen White	Carmen "Carmy" Berzatto	The Bear	FX	

== Actors with multiple awards ==
6 wins

- Alan Alda

4 wins

- Michael J. Fox

3 wins

- Alec Baldwin
- Jeremy Allen White

2 wins

- Bill Cosby
- Ted Danson
- Kelsey Grammer
- Jason Sudeikis
- Henry Winkler

== Series with multiple awards ==
6 wins

- M*A*S*H (CBS)

4 wins

- Spin City (ABC)

3 wins

- 30 Rock (NBC)
- The Bear (FX)
- Happy Days (ABC)

2 wins

- The Cosby Show (NBC)
- Cheers (NBC)
- Frasier (NBC)
- Ted Lasso (AppleTV+)

== Actors with multiple nominations ==
11 nominations

- Alan Alda

10 nominations

- Ted Danson

9 nominations

- Michael J. Fox

8 nominations

- Kelsey Grammer

7 nominations

- Alec Baldwin
- Judd Hirsch

6 nominations

- Steve Carell
- Eric McCormack
- Bob Newhart
- Carroll O'Connor

5 nominations

- Tim Allen
- Matt LeBlanc
- Steve Martin
- Tony Shalhoub
- Martin Short

4 nominations

- Don Cheadle
- Bill Cosby
- David Duchovny
- Redd Foxx
- John Goodman
- Bill Hader
- Hal Linden
- Craig T. Nelson
- Paul Reiser
- John Ritter
- Jerry Seinfeld
- Jeremy Allen White

3 nominations

- Anthony Anderson
- Zach Braff
- Larry David
- Ricky Gervais
- Donald Glover
- Robert Guillaume
- Thomas Jane
- John Lithgow
- Gavin MacLeod
- Richard Mulligan
- Jim Parsons
- Tony Randall
- Burt Reynolds
- Charlie Sheen
- Jason Sudeikis
- Jeffrey Tambor
- Bruce Willis
- Flip Wilson

2 nominations

- Aziz Ansari
- Jason Bateman
- Herschel Bernardi
- Adam Brody
- Louis C.K.
- Dabney Coleman
- Tony Danza
- Michael Douglas
- Gael García Bernal
- Nicholas Hoult
- Jack Klugman
- Jason Lee
- Bernie Mac
- William H. Macy
- Matthew Morrison
- Frankie Muniz
- Ed O'Neill
- Ray Romano
- Fred Savage
- George Segal
- Jason Segel
- Garry Shandling
- Will Smith
- Robin Williams
- Henry Winkler
- Ramy Youssef

== Series with multiple nominations ==
11 nominations

- M*A*S*H (CBS)

10 nominations

- Only Murders in the Building (Hulu)

8 nominations

- Cheers (NBC)
- Frasier (NBC)

7 nominations

- 30 Rock (NBC)

6 nominations

- All in the Family (CBS)
- The Office
- Will & Grace (NBC)

5 nominations

- Home Improvement (ABC)
- Monk (USA)
- Spin City (ABC)
- Taxi (ABC)

4 nominations

- Barney Miller (ABC)
- Barry (HBO)
- The Bear (FX)
- The Big Bang Theory (CBS)
- Californication (Showtime)
- Coach (ABC)
- The Dean Martin Show (NBC)
- Family Ties (NBC)
- Mad About You (NBC)
- Newhart (CBS)
- Roseanne (ABC)
- Sanford and Son (NBC)
- Seinfeld (NBC)

3 nominations

- 3rd Rock from the Sun (NBC)
- Atlanta (FX)
- Benson (ABC)
- Black-ish (ABC)
- Curb Your Enthusiasm (Fox)
- The Cosby Show (NBC)
- Empty Nest (NBC)
- Evening Shade (CBS)
- The Flip Wilson Show (NBC)
- Happy Days (ABC)
- House of Lies (Showtime)
- Hung (HBO)
- The Love Boat (ABC)
- The Man from U.N.C.L.E. (NBC)
- Moonlighting (ABC)
- Run for Your Life (NBC)
- Scrubs (NBC)
- Ted Lasso (AppleTV+)
- Three's Company (ABC)
- Transparent (Amazon)

2 nominations

- Arnie (CBS)
- Arrested Development (Fox)
- The Bernie Mac Show (Fox)
- The Bob Newhart Show (CBS)
- Dear John (NBC)
- Dharma & Greg (ABC)
- Episodes (Showtime)
- Everybody Loves Raymond (CBS)
- The Fresh Prince of Bel-Air (NBC)
- Friends (NBC)
- The Fugitive (ABC)
- Glee (Fox)
- The Great (Hulu)
- I Spy (NBC)
- Just Shoot Me! (NBC)
- The Kominsky Method (Netflix)
- The Larry Sanders Show (HBO)
- Louie (FX)
- Love, Sidney (NBC)
- Malcolm in the Middle (Fox)
- Married... with Children (Fox)
- Master of None (Netflix)
- Mission: Impossible (CBS)
- Mork & Mindy (ABC)
- Mozart in the Jungle (Amazon)
- My Name Is Earl (NBC)
- Nobody Wants This (Netflix)
- The Odd Couple (ABC)
- Ramy (Hulu)
- Shameless (Showtime)
- Shrinking (AppleTV+)
- Two and a Half Men (CBS)
- Who's the Boss? (ABC)
- The Wonder Years (ABC)

== See also ==
- TCA Award for Individual Achievement in Comedy
- Critics' Choice Television Award for Best Actor in a Comedy Series
- Primetime Emmy Award for Outstanding Lead Actor in a Comedy Series
- Screen Actors Guild Award for Outstanding Performance by a Male Actor in a Comedy Series
