= Mickey (TV series) =

American television series

- Genre: Sitcom
- Created by: Bob Fisher; Arthur Marx
- Directed by: Richard Whorf
- Starring: Mickey Rooney; Sammee Tong; Emmaline Henry
- Composer: Robert Hammack
- Country of origin: United States
- Original language: English
- No. of seasons: 1
- No. of episodes: 17 (list of episodes)

Production
- Executive producer: Selig J. Seligman
- Producers: Bob Fisher; Arthur Marx
- Cinematography: Fleet Southcott
- Editor: Floyd Knudtson
- Camera setup: Multi-camera
- Running time: 30 minutes
- Production companies: Selmur Productions; Four K's, Inc. ABC Television Network

Original release
- Network: ABC
- Release: September 16, 1964 – January 13, 1965

Mickey is an American sitcom that aired on ABC from September 1964 to January 1965. Created and produced by Bob Fisher and Arthur Marx, the series starred Mickey Rooney, and was filmed at Metro-Goldwyn-Mayer Studios.

== Synopsis ==
Mickey Grady (Mickey Rooney) had been a Coast Guard recruiter in Omaha, Nebraska who wanted to live by the ocean. When he inherits the luxury Newport Arms Hotel in Newport Beach, California, he thinks all his dreams have come true. Mickey soon learns Sammy Ling, the hotel manager with a lifetime contract, had let the hotel fall deep in debt, and the Grady family would need to find ways to make the hotel profitable.

== Cast ==
- Mickey Rooney as Mickey Grady
- Emmaline Henry as Nora Grady
- Sammee Tong as Sammy Ling

=== Recurring ===
- Tim Rooney as Tim Grady
- Brian Nash as Buddy Grady
- Bobby Van as Bobby
- Alan Reed as Mr. Swindler

== Awards ==
Rooney won a Golden Globe Award for "Best Actor in a Television Series" at the 21st Annual Golden Globe Awards ceremonies in 1964.

== Reception and cancellation ==
The series failed to sustain ratings to survive the full season in its 9 p.m. Eastern time slot on Wednesdays. Its principal competition was another sitcom, the top-ten series The Dick Van Dyke Show on CBS. NBC ran television movies at the time.

Due to low ratings, ABC was considering canceling Mickey. The network was hesitant to cancel the series due to the popularity of Sammee Tong's character, who had a solid fanbase thanks to Tong's role in Bachelor Father. Rooney wrote in his 1991 autobiography, Life Is Too Short that Tong was upset by the rumor; a heavy gambler who owed money to the mafia, Tong needed the money from the series to pay off his debts. On October 27, 1964, Tong took an overdose of barbiturates and died at his home. Tong's death effectively ended any chance for the series' survival, and ABC canceled Mickey. The series' last episode aired on January 13, 1965.

== Episode list ==
No.	Title	Directed by	Written by	Original release date
1	"Seaside, Westside"	Unknown	Unknown	September 16, 1964
2	"The Big Jump"	Unknown	Unknown	September 23, 1964
3	"The Case of the Slippery Slipsy"	Unknown	Unknown	September 30, 1964
4	"How to Raise Children Without Really Trying"	Unknown	Unknown	October 7, 1964
5	"Mickey Crashes the Movies"	Unknown	Unknown	October 14, 1964
6	"The Way the Fortune Cookie Crumbles"	Unknown	Unknown	October 21, 1964
7	"Goodnight, Whoever You Are"	Unknown	Unknown	October 28, 1964
Note: Sammee Tong died of a drug overdose the day before this episode aired.
8	"Nobody Buys Retail"	Unknown	Unknown	November 4, 1964
9	"Hard Work Never Hurt Anyone"	Unknown	Unknown	November 11, 1964
10	"Honest Injun"	Unknown	Unknown	November 25, 1964
11	"Somebody's Been Sleeping in My Bed"	Unknown	Unknown	December 2, 1964
12	"For the Love of Grandpa Toddie"	Richard Whorf	John Fenton Murray	December 9, 1964
13	"One More Kiss"	Richard Whorf	Peter Barry & Bob Kaufman	December 16, 1964
14	"Luck O' the Irish"	Unknown	Unknown	December 23, 1964
15	"The Elephant Mickey Won't Forget"	Richard Whorf	Bob Fisher & Arthur Marx	December 30, 1964
16	"Be My Guest"	Unknown	Unknown	January 6, 1965
17	"Mickey Takes Over"	Unknown	Unknown	January 13, 1965
