= List of 20th Century Fox films (1970–1979) =

This is a list of films produced by 20th Century Fox (now 20th Century Studios) beginning in 1970 up until 1979.

Release date	Title	Notes
January 21, 1970	The Only Game in Town	
January 25, 1970	M*A*S*H	Nominated for the Academy Award for Best Picture. Winner of the Golden Globe Award for Best Motion Picture – Musical or Comedy. Inducted into the National Film Registry in 1996.
February 1, 1970	The Kremlin Letter	
March 29, 1970	The Sicilian Clan	French/Italian film
April 2, 1970	Patton	Winner of the Academy Award for Best Picture. Nominated for the Golden Globe Award for Best Motion Picture – Drama. Inducted into the National Film Registry in 2003.
June 12, 1970	Beneath the Planet of the Apes	
June 17, 1970	Beyond the Valley of the Dolls	
June 26, 1970	Myra Breckinridge	
July 15, 1970	Hello-Goodbye	British
July 31, 1970	Move	
August 7, 1970	The Games	British
September 23, 1970	4 Clowns	
September 25, 1970	Tora! Tora! Tora!	
October 1, 1970	Cover Me Babe	
October 11, 1970	The Great White Hope	
December 6, 1970	Gimme Shelter	US theatrical distribution only; produced by Maysles Films
January 31, 1971	Countess Dracula	USA distribution only; produced by The Rank Organisation (Note: Owned by ITV Studios) and Hammer Film Productions
February 9, 1971	Little Murders	
March 13, 1971	Vanishing Point	
March 26, 1971	Making It	
March 31, 1971	B.S. I Love You	
April 9, 1971	The Mephisto Waltz	
May 9, 1971	The Panic in Needle Park	
May 21, 1971	Escape from the Planet of the Apes	
July 1, 1971	Walkabout	
July 23, 1971	The Seven Minutes	
August 19, 1971	The Marriage of a Young Stockbroker	
October 1, 1971	The French Connection	Winner of the Academy Award for Best Picture. Nominated for the Golden Globe Award for Best Motion Picture – Drama. Inducted into the National Film Registry in 2005.
November 17, 1971	Blindman	co produced by Abkco Films
December 10, 1971	Welcome Home Soldier Boys	
December 12, 1971	Made for Each Other	
January 26, 1972	The Hot Rock	
February 13, 1972,	Cabaret	international theatrical distribution only; produced by Allied Artists & ABC Pictures
February 19, 1972	Without Apparent Motive	French film USA distribution only (Note: Owned by StudioCanal)
March 23, 1972	The Concert for Bangladesh	US theatrical distribution only; produced by Apple Corps
April 16, 1972	The Culpepper Cattle Co.	
May 26, 1972	The Other	
June 14, 1972	Fillmore	US theatrical distribution only
June 16, 1972	What Became of Jack and Jill? (Note: Owned by Bristol Myers Squibb)	distribution only; produced by Palomar Pictures
June 16, 1972	The Strange Vengeance of Rosalie	distribution only; produced by Palomar Pictures
June 30, 1972	Conquest of the Planet of the Apes	
August 23, 1972	To Kill a Clown	distribution only; produced by Palomar Pictures
August 30, 1972	The Salzburg Connection	
September 24, 1972	Sounder	theatrical distribution only; produced by Robert B. Radnitz. Nominated for the Academy Award for Best Picture. Inducted into the National Film Registry in 2021.
September 27, 1972	The Darwin Adventure	distribution only; produced by Palomar Pictures
October 11, 1972	Vampire Circus	USA distribution only; produced by The Rank Organisation and Hammer Film Productions
October 19, 1972	When the Legends Die	
October 22, 1972	The Discreet Charm of the Bourgeoisie	US theatrical distribution only
November 1, 1972	Trouble Man	
November 29, 1972	And Hope to Die	French/Italian film USA/Australia/Norway theatrical distribution only
December 13, 1972	The Poseidon Adventure	Nominated for the Golden Globe Award for Best Motion Picture – Drama.
December 17, 1972	The Heartbreak Kid	distribution only; produced by Palomar Pictures
December 20, 1972	The Effect of Gamma Rays on the Man-in-the-Moon Marigolds	
December 20, 1972	Sleuth	distribution only; produced by Palomar Pictures; Nominated for the Golden Globe Award for Best Motion Picture – Drama.
March 30, 1973	Gospel Road: A Story of Jesus	
April 4, 1973	Ace Eli and Rodger of the Skies	
May 1973	Kid Blue	
June 1, 1973	Emperor of the North Pole	
June 6, 1973	The Legend of Hell House	British
June 14, 1973	Battle for the Planet of the Apes	
July 26, 1973	The Last American Hero	
August 10, 1973	Gordon's War	co-production with Palomar Pictures
August 15, 1973	The Neptune Factor	
September 28, 1973	Hex	
October 16, 1973	The Paper Chase	
October 17, 1973	The Mad Adventures of Rabbi Jacob	France / Italy
December 12, 1973	The Three Musketeers	Nominated for the Golden Globe Award for Best Motion Picture – Musical or Comedy British; produced by Film Trust S.A.
December 14, 1973	The Seven-Ups	
December 19, 1973	Cinderella Liberty	Nominated for the Golden Globe Award for Best Motion Picture – Drama.
December 21, 1973	The Laughing Policeman	
February 6, 1974	Zardoz	
March 27, 1974	Conrack	
April 22, 1974	Claudine	co-production with Third World Cinema Corporation
May 17, 1974	Dirty Mary Crazy Larry	
June 28, 1974	S*P*Y*S	co produced by EMI Films
August 7, 1974	Together Brothers	
August 12, 1974	Harry and Tonto	Nominated for the Golden Globe Award for Best Motion Picture – Musical or Comedy.
August 29, 1974	99 and 44/100% Dead	
September 26, 1974	11 Harrowhouse	British
October 1974	The House on Skull Mountain	
October 18, 1974	The Crazy World of Julius Vrooder	
October 27, 1974	The Phantom of Liberty	USA theatrical distribution
October 31, 1974	Phantom of the Paradise	
December 13, 1974	The Towering Inferno	Nominated for the Academy Award for Best Picture co-production with Warner Bros.
December 18, 1974	Young Frankenstein	Inducted into the National Film Registry in 2003.
January 15, 1975	The Nickel Ride	
February 26, 1975	The Four Musketeers	USA/UK/Japan/Norway theatrical distribution only; produced by Film Trust S.A.
March 1, 1975	At Long Last Love	
April 16, 1975	Capone	
April 16, 1975	Ransom	USA & Australia distribution only; produced by British Lion Films
May 21, 1975	French Connection II	
May 21, 1975	W.W. and the Dixie Dancekings	
June 27, 1975	Race with the Devil	
August 1975	The Man from Hong Kong	USA distribution only; produced by Golden Harvest (Note: Owned by Star China Media (via Fortune Star Media Limited))
September 4, 1975	Tarzoon, la honte de la jungle	distribution in France only
September 26, 1975	The Rocky Horror Picture Show	Inducted into the National Film Registry in 2005.
September 30, 1975	Black Moon	USA/Australia/Italy theatrical distribution only
October 10, 1975	Royal Flash	
October 15, 1975	Whiffs	distribution only; produced by Brut Productions (Note: Owned by Warner Bros. (via Turner Entertainment Co.))
October 17, 1975	Down the Ancient Staircase	Italian/French film
October 29, 1975	Take a Hard Ride	
December 3, 1975	Peeper	
December 14, 1975	The Adventure of Sherlock Holmes' Smarter Brother	
December 25, 1975	Lucky Lady	
1976	Survival	filmed in December 1969
January 23, 1976	Hugo the Hippo	distribution only; produced by Brut Productions
January 25, 1976	Scent of a Woman	USA theatrical distribution only
February 4, 1976	Next Stop, Greenwich Village	
February 18, 1976	I Will, I Will... for Now	distribution only; produced by Brut Productions
March 26, 1976	Sky Riders	
April 1, 1976	The Duchess and the Dirtwater Fox	
April 5, 1976	The Blue Bird	Fifth adaptation of novel by Maurice Maeterlinck co-production with Lenfilm; American-Soviet co-production co-production with Lenfilm
May 12, 1976	End of the Game	German film USA theatrical distribution only
May 26, 1976	Mother, Jugs & Speed	
June 1, 1976	The Last Hard Men	
June 2, 1976	Breaking Point	distribution only; produced by Astral Films
June 16, 1976	Silent Movie	Nominated for the Golden Globe Award for Best Motion Picture – Musical or Comedy.
June 25, 1976	The Omen	co-production with Mace Neufeld Productions
July 1976	Moving Violation	
September 26, 1976	The Sunday Woman	theatrical distribution only
October 3, 1976	Alex & the Gypsy	
October 8, 1976	Fighting Mad	
November 1976	Kenny & Company	
November 12, 1976	All This and World War II	
December 3, 1976	Silver Streak	
February 9, 1977	Wizards	co-production with Bakshi Productions
March 3, 1977	Mr. Billion	
April 1977	Lovers Like Us	French film distribution only
April 1, 1977	Raggedy Ann & Andy: A Musical Adventure	distribution only; co-production with the Bobbs-Merrill Company and Richard Williams Productions
April 3, 1977	3 Women	
May 25, 1977	Star Wars	Nominated for Academy Award for Best Picture. Nominated for Golden Globe Award for Best Motion Picture – Drama. Nominated for BAFTA Award for Best Film. Inducted into the National Film Registry in 1989. Retitled Star Wars: Episode IV – A New Hope in 1981. co-production with Lucasfilm
June 8, 1977	The Other Side of Midnight	
June 9, 1977	Fire Sale	
August 1977	The Black Pearl	
August 24, 1977	Thunder and Lightning	
October 2, 1977	Julia	Nominated for the Academy Award for Best Picture. Nominated for the Golden Globe Award for Best Motion Picture – Drama.
October 21, 1977	Damnation Alley	
November 14, 1977	The Turning Point	Nominee of the Academy Award for Best Picture. Winner of the Golden Globe Award for Best Motion Picture – Drama.
December 18, 1977	The World's Greatest Lover	
December 25, 1977	High Anxiety	Nominated for the Golden Globe Award for Best Motion Picture – Musical or Comedy.
March 5, 1978	An Unmarried Woman	Nominated for the Academy Award for Best Picture. Nominated for the Golden Globe Award for Best Motion Picture – Drama.
March 10, 1978	The Fury	
June 9, 1978	Damien: Omen II	co-production with Mace Neufeld Productions
June 28, 1978	The Driver	USA distribution only; produced by EMI Films
August 29, 1978	A Wedding	co-production with Lion's Gate Films, Inc.
October 4, 1978	The Boys from Brazil	USA distribution only; produced by ITC Entertainment
November 8, 1978	Magic (Note: Owned by Dark Sky Films)	USA distribution only; produced by Joseph E. Levine
February 9, 1979	Quintet	co-production with Lion's Gate Films, Inc.
March 2, 1979	Norma Rae	Nominated for the Academy Award for Best Picture. Nominated for the Golden Globe Award for Best Motion Picture – Drama.
April 6, 1979	A Perfect Couple	
April 27, 1979	Dreamer	
May 25, 1979	Alien	co-production with Brandywine Productions; Inducted into the National Film Registry in 2002.
June 15, 1979	Butch and Sundance: The Early Days	
July 20, 1979	Breaking Away	Nominated for the Academy Award for Best Picture. Winner of the Golden Globe Award for Best Motion Picture – Musical or Comedy.
September 1979	The Strange Case of Alice Cooper	distribution only; produced by Jaybar Industries; Direct-to-video release
September 30, 1979	La Luna	
October 1, 1979	Nosferatu the Vampyre	theatrical distribution only
October 19, 1979	Avalanche Express	distribution only; produced by Lorimar Productions (Note: Owned by Warner Bros.)
November 7, 1979	The Rose	Nominated for the Golden Globe Award for Best Motion Picture – Musical or Comedy.
November 16, 1979	The Runner Stumbles	distribution only; produced by Melvin Simon Productions
December 20, 1979	All That Jazz	North American theatrical and worldwide home video distribution only; co-production with Columbia Pictures; Nominated for the Academy Award for Best Picture. Inducted into the National Film Registry in 2001.
December 21, 1979	Scavenger Hunt	distribution only; produced by Melvin Simon Productions
