= Hugo the Hippo =

- Hungarian theatrical release poster
- Directed by: William Feigenbaum; József Gémes (Animation)
- Written by: Thomas Baum; William Feigenbaum; József Szalóky
- Produced by: Robert Halmi Sr.
- Starring: English version: Robert Morley; Paul Lynde; Jesse Emmett; Ronnie Cox
- Narrated by: English version: Burl Ives
- Edited by: Sid Cooper; Magda Hap; Mária Kern
- Music by: Burt Keyes; Robert Larimer
- Production companies: Brut Productions; Pannónia Filmstúdió
- Distributed by: 20th Century Fox
- Release dates: 25 December 1975 (Hungary); 23 January 1976 (U.S.)
- Running time: 86 minutes (Hungary); 91 minutes (U.S.)
- Countries: Hungary; United States
- Languages: English; Hungarian
- Budget: US$1 million

Hugo the Hippo (Hungarian: Hugó, a víziló) is a 1975 animated film produced by the Pannónia Filmstúdió of Hungary and co-produced in the United States by Brut Productions, a division of French perfume company Faberge. It was released in Hungary in 1975 and in the United States in 1976 by 20th Century Fox (as its first animated feature film distribution). The film was directed by William Feigenbaum and József Gémes (who directed the animation).

== Plot ==
The harbor of Zanzibar becomes infested with a gang of vicious great white sharks, which makes it impossible for trading ships to dock. In an attempt to fix the problem, the Sultan charges his advisor, Aban-Khan, to bring twelve hippopotamuses into the harbor to keep the sharks away. His idea works well enough, but once the hippos are no longer a novelty and the people no longer feed them, they begin to starve. After the hungry hippos rampage through the city looking for food, Aban-Khan brutally slaughters all the hippos except one, a baby hippo named Hugo. Hugo escapes across the sea to the city of Dar es Salaam, on the African mainland.

A group of children, led by a farmer boy named Jorma, find Hugo and attempt to hide him as best they can, building a garden to feed and take care of him. However, Hugo is discovered, and the garden is burned by the angry parents to prevent their children wasting their time with him and neglecting their schoolwork. As a result, Hugo is forced to scavenge from the local farms for food. When Aban-Khan, still obsessed about catching Hugo, hears of the incident, he travels to Dar es Salaam and with the aid of the Sultan's court wizard converts the farm of Jorma's family into an enchanted garden filled with gigantic fruits and vegetables. Once Hugo is lured into the trap, the plants turn into monsters thirsting to kill both Hugo and Jorma, who has come to Hugo's aid. Despite their best efforts to get away, they end up overwhelmed and captured by Aban-Khan.

Hugo is put on trial for the damage his nighttime raids caused. Fortunately, the children manage to contact the Sultan, who agrees to appear in court to speak for Hugo. The ruler makes a powerfully impassioned speech about how the hippos were mistreated both by their neglect and their uncalled-for culling, which removes all doubt that Hugo is the true injured party in this affair. As a result, while Aban-Khan comes to feel the wrath of a populace's mind turning against him, Hugo is released and the children are charged by the judge to care for him for the rest of his days.

== Cast and crew ==
- Directors - William Feigenbaum and József Gémes
- Screenplay - Thomas Baum, William Feigenbaum and József Szalóky
- Production Design - Graham Percy

=== Voices ===
Character	English (Original)	Hungarian
Narrator	Burl Ives	Ferenc Bessenyei
Magin Sultan	Robert Morley	László Márkus
Aban-Khan	Paul Lynde	Tamás Major
Royal Magician	Jesse Emmett	István Szatmári
Jorma	Ronnie Cox	Gábor Berkes
Jorma's Father	Percy Rodriguez	István Bujtor
Mr. M'Bow-Wow	Lance Taylor Sr.	János Körmendi
Judge	Len Maxwell	György Győrffy
Singers	Marie Osmond; Jimmy Osmond; Burl Ives	Kati Kovács; Erzsébet Kútvölgyi; Péter Máté

Additional English (Original) Voices

- Don Marshall

== Production ==
Hugo the Hippo was the first international release of a PannoniaFilm production; prior to this, they had also made Hungary's first animated feature, János Vitéz, in 1973. The film, produced over a two-year period, received funding from the Faberge company via its Brut Productions label. Its U.S. distributor, 20th Century-Fox, acquired Hugo along with two other Brut films starring Elliott Gould, Whiffs and I Will, I Will... for Now though current rights to these films are now owned by Warner Bros. as a result of Turner Entertainment's acquisition of the company followed by the Turner-Time Warner merger in 1996.

== Home media ==
After an unsuccessful box-office run, Hugo was briefly released to the American home video market in the early 1980s by Magnetic Video Corporation. It was first released on DVD in Hungary and Italy. Reviewer Phil Hall suggested that Hugo the Hippo would never get a DVD release due to being psychedelic, weird, politically incorrect and violent. However, Warner Home Video did eventually release the film on DVD through the Warner Archive Collection on June 23, 2015.

== Other media ==
A version of the song The Best Day Ever Made was used in the 1988–1992 animatronic show Care Bears Care-A-Lot Castle Show which was located in Dorney Park & Wildwater Kingdom.

== See also ==
- List of American films of 1975
- List of animated feature-length films
- List of 20th Century Fox theatrical animated features
- Zanzibar
- Hippopotamus
- Yellow Submarine (film)

== Bibliography ==
- Mbonde, John Pantaleon (2004) [1972]. Hugo the Hippo (Paperback). Dar es Salaam, Tanzania: Mathews Bookstore & Stationers. ISBN 9987-602-29-0.
