= Whiffs =

1975 film by Ted Post

- Directed by: Ted Post
- Written by: Malcolm Marmorstein
- Produced by: George Barrie
- Starring: Elliott Gould; Eddie Albert; Harry Guardino; Godfrey Cambridge; Jennifer O'Neill
- Cinematography: David M. Walsh
- Edited by: Robert Lawrence
- Music by: John Cameron
- Production company: Brut Productions
- Distributed by: 20th Century Fox
- Release date: October 15, 1975
- Running time: 91 minutes
- Country: United States
- Language: English

Whiffs is a 1975 comedy film directed by Ted Post and starring Elliott Gould, Eddie Albert, Harry Guardino, Godfrey Cambridge, and Jennifer O'Neill. It was produced by Brut Productions and released theatrically in the U.S. by 20th Century Fox.

The film was released in the UK as C.A.S.H.

== Plot ==
A group of gullible military private volunteers to be the subject of numerous military biological and chemical weaponry experiments, and later robs banks as a result.

== Cast ==
- Elliott Gould as Dudley Frapper
- Eddie Albert as Col. Lockyer
- Harry Guardino as Chops Mulligan
- Godfrey Cambridge as Dusty
- Jennifer O'Neill as Lt. Scottie Hallam
- Don "Red" Barry as Sgt. Post
- James Brown as State Trooper
- Richard Masur as Lockyer's Aide
- Howard Hesseman as Dr. Gopian
- Jack Colley performing the stunt piloting maneuvers

== Production ==
=== Development ===
The film was made by Brut Productions, a short lived film production company that was an off-shoot of Faberge Cosmetics under George Barrie. Their early films included Night Watch, Welcome to Arrow Beach, A Touch of Class and Count Your Bullets.

In June 1974 Barrie announced he would turn producer with Whiffs based on an original story and script by Malcolm Mamorstein, with Ted Post to direct. "It's a comedy-satire about a young man, an expert on testing gases, who winds up using all that knowledge for other purposes," said Barrie.

=== Casting ===
Marmorstein later recalled, "George Barrie knew that I had done S*P*Y*S and was looking for someone with a comedic touch, so he suggested Elliott Gould."

Elliott Gould insisted his then-girlfriend Jennifer O'Neill play the female lead.

“We really didn't want to hire her,” said Marmorstein, “because we thought, what if their romance breaks up in the middle of the film?... We had good choices [for her part]. Everybody wanted to play it, but Gould wanted her.””

"I thought I was gonna marry Jennifer,” Gould said later. “Since I couldn’t, I thought that she’d be perfect to be my nurse [in “Whiffs.”] Teri Garr was up for the part. I needed a funny girl. But I wanted to be loyal to the beautiful, amazing person that Jennifer is...” She signed in August 1974.

=== Filming ===
Parts of the film were shot in Dugway, Stockton and Tooele, Utah.

Gould and O'Neill broke up during filming. “I physically got in between them, stuff like that,” said Marmorstein. Jennifer O’Neill was not much of an actress at the time, and it was tough."

Marmorstein said "Ted Post was a very amiable guy. Except he had no idea how to shoot comedy. Also, he was too in love with zoom lenses, which is fine for TV. I conspired with the director of photography to switch to a prime lens each time Ted was ready for a new setup. For his first shot, he chose a huge, complex, all-encompassing shot that put us days behind schedule.”

The film was going to be made for Warner Bros. but ended up being released by 20th Century Fox. However, film ownership eventually went to Warner Bros. through Turner Entertainment Co. Warner Home Video released the film on 2013 through the Warner Archive Collection.

== Reception ==
TV Guide wrote, in reference to the story line of Elliott Gould's character behaving like a chimpanzee because he breathed in an experimental chemical, "The scriptwriter must have taken a good whiff of the gas himself each time he sat down at his typewriter."

The Los Angeles Times called it "as funny as a fire at an old folk's home."

"That picture didn't work," said Gould. "They went with the obvious comedy."

In 1976 he said the film featured his least favourite performance.

=== Awards and nominations ===
Award	Category	Nominee(s)	Result	Ref.
Academy Awards	Best Original Song	"Now That We're in Love"; Music by George Barrie; Lyrics by Sammy Cahn	Nominated	
Golden Globe Awards	Best Original Song	"Now That We're in Love"; Music by George Barrie; Lyrics by Sammy Cahn	Nominated	

== See also ==
- List of American films of 1975
