= Michael Frank (disambiguation) =

Michael Frank (1804–1894) was an American pioneer, newspaper editor, and politician.

Michael Frank may also refer to:

- Michael Frank (music producer), the founder of the Earwig Music Company
- Michael Sigismund Frank (1770–1847), Catholic artist and rediscoverer of the lost art of glass-painting
- Michael C. Frank, developmental psychologist at Stanford University
- Michael J. Frank, neuroscientist
- Mike Frank, American Major League Baseball outfielder
- Michael Frank (film director), Australian film director
- Michael Frank, creator of the Museum of Bad Art
- Michael Frank (writer), American writer

== See also ==
- Frank Michael (disambiguation)
- Hans Michael Frank
- Stephen Michael Frank
- Michael Franks (disambiguation)
