= Night Watch (1973 film) =

1973 film by Brian G. Hutton

- Theatrical release poster
- Directed by: Brian G. Hutton
- Screenplay by: Tony Williamson
- Based on: Night Watch by Lucille Fletcher
- Produced by: Martin Poll; George W. George; Barnard S. Straus
- Starring: Elizabeth Taylor; Laurence Harvey; Billie Whitelaw
- Cinematography: Billy Williams
- Edited by: John Jympson
- Music by: John Cameron
- Production companies: Brut Productions; Night Watch Films
- Distributed by: Avco Embassy Pictures
- Release dates: 10 August 1973 (United States); 6 September 1973 (United Kingdom)
- Running time: 99 minutes
- Countries: United Kingdom; United States
- Language: English

Night Watch is a 1973 mystery horror thriller film directed by Brian G. Hutton from a screenplay by Tony Williamson, based on the 1972 play of the same name by Lucille Fletcher. An international co-production between the United Kingdom and the United States, the film reunited Elizabeth Taylor with co-star Laurence Harvey from their 1960 collaboration BUtterfield 8. It was the last time the pair acted together on screen. Some of the story elements recall the plot outline of the 1944 film Gaslight.

== Plot ==
In London, during a raging thunderstorm one night, Ellen Wheeler frantically tells her husband, John, that from the living-room window she has seen a man with his throat slit in a chair by the window in the deserted house across the way. John calls the police, but a search of the old house finds no evidence of a murder.

The next morning, Ellen notices a freshly planted bed of Laburnum in the garden next to the old house that was not there before. She calls the investigating detective, Inspector Walker, and suggests that the body of the murder victim she witnessed may be buried there. Inspector Walker questions the neighbour, Mr. Appleby, who confirms that he planted the trees the night before during the storm, but refuses to let the police search the garden or dig up the trees.

Ellen is recovering from a nervous breakdown that occurred after her unfaithful first husband, Carl, was killed a few years earlier in a car accident with his young paramour, and continues to suffer from recurring nightmares of the event. After learning that Ellen has called Inspector Walker multiple times about the investigation, John suggests that she see his psychiatrist friend, Tony. Indignant, Ellen continues to insist that she saw a murder in the house, but since there is no proof, John remains sceptical.

Ellen's visiting friend Sarah Cooke is equally sceptical, suggesting that Ellen sees what she thinks she sees because of her recent breakdown. That night, when both Ellen and Sarah see a light moving behind the old house's shutters, they call the police, who discover Mr. Appleby wandering around with a flashlight and arrest him for trespassing. A second search of the house and excavation of the garden reveal nothing, and Inspector Walker privately tells John that the case is officially closed.

That evening, Ellen tells John and Sarah that she saw another body in the old house, that of a woman. Ellen is then sedated by John and Sarah, who believe that Ellen is losing her mind. The next day, Ellen agrees to see Tony and recounts to him Carl's fatal car accident. Tony advises her to check into a clinic in Switzerland for a few weeks, to which Ellen agrees. Shortly afterwards, Ellen calls Inspector Walker and urges him to search the old house again. After falsely promising to do so, he reveals that the premise was purchased six months earlier by a private company, DIPCO.

The following evening, as Ellen prepares to depart for Switzerland, John asks her to sign several financial documents, including a power of attorney granting him control over their financial holdings. She complies, before noticing in the documents that John had recently acquired DIPCO. Ellen angrily accuses John and Sarah of having an affair, revealing that she had discovered their tickets for Bermuda. She assails them for plotting to torment her in order to have her committed, and claims Sarah was trying to poison her. When John denies Ellen's accusations, she runs to the old house and lets herself inside; John and Sarah both chase after her. Ellen lures the two to the second-floor room where she claimed to have seen the bodies. There, she slashes John's throat and stabs Sarah to death, before positioning them in exactly the same manner that she claimed to have seen the two bodies.

She then calls the police and once again claims to have seen two murdered bodies in the abandoned house, wearying them into apathy over investigating her actual killings. Mr. Appleby, who had grown up in John and Ellen's house as a child, makes a surprise visit, congratulating Ellen on pulling off her scheme. He assures her that he does not intend to report the murders, as Inspector Walker would not believe him. Ellen asks Mr. Appleby to look after her house and the garden while she is away, indefinitely. Mr. Appleby happily agrees to the bargain as Ellen bids him goodbye and departs.

== Cast ==
- Elizabeth Taylor as Ellen Wheeler
- Laurence Harvey as John Wheeler
- Billie Whitelaw as Sarah Cooke
- Robert Lang as Mr. Appleby
- Tony Britton as Tony
- Bill Dean as Inspector Walker
- Michael Danvers-Walker as Sergeant Norris
- Rosario Serrano as Dolores
- Pauline Jameson as secretary
- Linda Hayden as girl in car
- Kevin Colson as Carl
- Laon Maybanke as florist
- David Jackson as Wilson

== Production ==
Night Watch was based on the play of the same name by Lucille Fletcher, starring Joan Hackett. The play opened in February 1972. The New York Times called it "a most excellent thriller... a first class example of its genre".

Film rights to the play were bought prior to the play reaching Broadway by producer Martin Poll. He set up the film at Brut Productions, a newly formed film division of the Fabergé Company, run by Fabergé owner George Barrie. It was one of the first films from that company. Poll said, "It's really a lot more now than a suspense story. It deals with the relationship between people torn by their emotions, their betrayals and jealousies."

It was decided to relocate the story to England. The screenplay was by Tony Williamson, with additional dialogue by Evan Jones. The film was shot at Elstree Studios in London. Brut financed the film entirely, with Taylor taking a smaller salary in exchange for a larger percentage. Director Brian G. Hutton had just made X Y & Zee (1972) with Taylor. Harvey's casting was announced in April 1972. Barrie would later finance Harvey's last film, Welcome to Arrow Beach (1974).

Filming was interrupted several times. It shut down for a week when Hutton contracted bronchitis, and then later for six more weeks so Harvey could have an operation on his stomach. Harvey said at the time that the operation was due to appendicitis, but it was in fact stomach cancer, which would kill him shortly after the picture was released. Filming wrapped in September 1972.

Although Barrie and John Cameron composed the musical score of the film, and Cameron was credited for it, the background music for a significant part of the film is Brahms' Piano Concerto No. 2 and Schubert's Unfinished Symphony.

In February 1973, Avco Embassy agreed to distribute the film along with another Brut Production, A Touch of Class.

== Critical reception ==
Time Out called it a "tired, old-fashioned thriller"; whereas The New York Times wrote, "Elizabeth Taylor, and about time, has got herself a good picture and a whodunit at that"; and Variety opined, "Lucille Fletcher's Night Watch isn't the first average stage play to be turned into a better than average film. Astute direction and an improved cast more than help". On the review aggregator website Rotten Tomatoes, 40% of 10 critics' reviews are positive, with an average rating of 4.5/10.
