= George Barrie =

American film producer

- Born: George Baranoff; 9 February 1912; New York City, New York, United States
- Died: 16 November 2002 (aged 90)
- Occupations: Company director, film producer, record producer
- Spouses: Lucille Schlussel (m. 1936; div. 1959); Gloria Litzenberg (m. 1960; div. 1978) Georgette Mosbacher (m. 1979; div. 1982) Dorothy Barrie (m. 1992; div. 1994) Dorothy Barrie (m. 1996; div. 2002)
- Children: 3

George Barrie (9 February 1912 – 16 November 2002) was an American entrepreneur and businessman best known as a pioneering figure in the American cosmetics industry, As owner and CEO Barrie consolidated and managed Rayette, Inc. and Fabergé Inc. for three decades. He created high demand hair care, cologne and grooming products, skillfully using product endorsement and sponsorships to build international brand awareness and sales.

Barrie said "the cosmetic business is much like the entertainment business in that you deal with illusions".

Barrie was also an executive film producer, an executive record producer and a songwriter, nominated twice for the Academy Award for Best Original Song and once for the Golden Globe Award for Best Original Song.

== Biography ==
George Barrie, born George Baranoff was the first of three children to Abraham "Abe" and Sonia (née Gershowitz) Baranoff in Brooklyn, New York and raised in Sandisfield, Massachusetts. Barrie's parents had emigrated to the US, his father, a painter and wall paper hanger from Kiev, Russia and his mother from Libau, Latvia.

Barrie taught himself to play the clarinet, guitar, piano and saxophone as a child. As a teenager, he moved back to New York City and supported himself playing in bands around Brooklyn.

== Cosmetics career ==
=== Early cosmetology products career ===
Married in the 1930s, Barrie took a salesman position with the St. Paul, Minnesota-based cosmetology products company Rayette, Inc. Barrie left the company and founded "Caryl Richards", a hair care products company named after his two children. The company sold both salon and home hair care products. In 1959 Barrie's success allowed him to merge Caryl Richards with his former employer Rayette, Inc. Joining him was Mark L. Arend, then executive vice president of Rayette. Arend initially served as chairman and Barrie was president.

Barrie immediately began an aggressive marketing campaign, increasing Rayette's sales by 700%.

=== Expanded through acquisitions ===
Barrie added graphic arts and printing capabilities through a 1961 acquisition of the Weaver Organization, Inc., a printing company at Long Island City, Queens.

In 1962 Barrie purchased smaller salon hair care product and fragrance companies including the Odell Company, Inc., which sold a line of salon hair care products, and Parfum Lorle, Inc., which manufactured and sold women's perfumes, colognes and deodorants and a line of men's deodorants and after-shave lotions.

In 1964 Barrie purchased the Omaha, Nebraska Tip-Top Products Company for $25 million (equivalent to $259,522,532 in 2025). In purchasing Tip-Top, Barrie acquired that company's 24 patents and their over 600 salon and home hair care products. The company's patents included their popular version of the bobby pin and the "Tip Top Easy (hair) Curler".

=== Aqua Net hairspray sold direct to consumers ===
In 1962 Rayette expanded its retail hair care business selling the formerly salon only Aqua Net aerosol hair spray direct to home consumers. Consumer sales were extremely high due to the then in vogue beehive and bouffant hairstyles. Marketed as the “AllWeather Hairspray”, the product was able to keep a hairstyle in place regardless or high humidity or rain. Aqua Net become the second best selling hairspray in six months. In 1963 Aqua Net became the best selling hairspray in the US as hairspray overtook lipstick as the country's most purchased beauty product.

=== Purchased Fabergé ===
In 1963 Rayette, Inc. purchased the perfume and hair-care company Fabergé Inc. for $20 million in cash and securities (equivalent to $210,326,087 in 2025). That year Fabergé was said to have earned annual sales between $15 and $20 million, while Rayette had earned $23 million.

=== Rayette, Inc. listed on the New York Stock Exchange ===
In July 1964 Barrie reported Rayette, Inc. had earned sales of $25.4 million (equivalent to $263,674,893 in 2025) in the first four months of the year. The common stock of Rayette, Inc. was listed that month on the New York Stock Exchange after five years of Barrie's efforts. The company was renamed Rayette-Fabergé, Inc.

Barrie changed the corporate name from Rayette-Fabergé to Fabergé in 1971.

== Fragrance marketing success ==
Barrie's promotion created world-wide awareness and demand for the company's line of fragrances and body care.

In the 1950s, Rayette created retail counter top testing displays allowing customers to sample five Rayette or Fabergé branded perfumes. Employing those Rayette product displays narrowed a fragrance shopper's choices to just Barrie's products, minimizing competition from competing products.

In 1969 Barrie increased annual advertising expenditures to $15,000,000 (equivalent to $138,875,598 in 2025) a 50% increase from $10,000,000 the previous year.

=== Tigress perfume ===
Introduced by Fabergé in 1938, the Tigress oriental fougère perfume was offered in faux-fur embossed packaging. The original slogan "To be worn by the light of the moon" was updated in the 1970s. The ads featured singer and dancer Lola Falana wearing a tiger striped bodysuit and used the slogan "Tigress, because men are such animals".

=== Brut men's cologne ===
Barrie had developed men's fragrances in the past, including Royale and Woodhue colognes. In 1964 Barrie developed high awareness and demand for Brut. Brut quickly became a highly successful men's fragrance through Barrie's use of high-profile athletes in print and television advertisements in promoting the new scent.

Barrie grew the Brut fragrance through product extension. Brut Aftershave debuted in 1966, quickly followed by Brut shaving cream, splash-on lotion, stick deodorant and Brut hairspray. Countering consumer resistance to the heavy, long-lasting Brut fragrance, Barrie introduced "Brut 33", the name referencing the formulation was 33% of the original Brut cologne.

Product endorsements for Brut from Joe Namath, Muhammad Ali, Hank Aaron and other male celebrities built awareness and demand for the brand. Extending the cologne's scent to include deodorant, grooming products and soap, annual sales increased by 51% in 1968 to $15,000,000 (equivalent to $138,875,598 in 2025). By 1969 Brut became the best selling men's fragrance in the world.

=== Babe women's perfume ===
In 1977 Babe perfume won two Fragrance Foundation awards in its first year: "Most Successful Introduction of a Women's Fragrance in Popular Distribution" and "Best Advertising Campaign". That first year saw Babe perfume become Faberge's largest selling women's fragrance worldwide.

=== Farrah Fawcett cosmetics ===
In 1977 Barrie launched the Farrah Fawcett line of shampoos, conditioners, and hair spray. Then a popular model and actress, she starred in "Charlie's Angels". The product line was endorsed by Fawcett and featured her in print and broadcast advertising.

== Celebrity endorsement pioneer ==
Barrie is considered a pioneer of celebrity endorsement marketing, hiring stars such as Farrah Fawcett, Laurence Harvey, Margaux Hemingway, Roger Moore, Muhammad Ali, Joe Namath and Pelé to endorse and promote company products to the world. In anticipation of starting a film production division, Barrie hired Cary Grant, adding him to Fabergé's board of directors.

=== Cary Grant ===
In 1968 Barrie persuaded Grant to join Fabergé serving as both a member of its board of directors and the company "creative consultant". The company's stock gained two points on the New York Stock Exchange the day Grant's appointment was announced. Grant didn't insist on a large salary. Barrie said "I told him to name his own figure (salary), but he'd only take $ 15,000 dollars. It's ludicrous isn't it?" However a Fabergé executive contradicted the claim saying "I can't really tell you how much Mr. Grant makes. It would make a lot of people jealous".

Impressed with Fabergé's international reach and its corporate jets, cars, helicopters and pilots, Grant admitted the primary reason he joined the company was free, unlimited travel. Grant explained "They think big. If I have to get into New York quickly they send a jet for me. There's a piano in one of them... we have jam sessions coast to coast". Grant was also given an office at Barrie's Fabergé Townhouse located at 5 West 54th Street in New York City. Grant often turned down appearance requests after joining Fabergé saying "my travels for Fabergé... are necessarily unscheduled and so spontaneous that I am seldom able to plan any engagement other than for a day or two in advance. Imagine being at the beck and call of a fragrance".

=== Joe Namath ===
In 1975 Barrie hired New York Giants quarterback Joe Namath as a Fabergé spokesman for $250,000 (equivalent to $1,495,826 in 2025) per year for two years with a 20-year renewal option. Barrie said Namath's contract "...could lead to payments in excess of the annual minimum... It is the most money ever paid a celebrity for promotional activities".

=== Margaux Hemingway ===
In 1977 Barrie's son Richard, then Fabergé executive vice-president and chief operating officer hired Margaux Hemingway to endorse Babe, the company's new women's perfume, saying "She is the kind of girl we are trying to attract... active, career-minded and yet into men... she is still sensuous". At that time, Fabergé's $1 million advertising contract (equivalent to $5,983,302 in 2025) with Hemingway was the largest offered to a female personality.

== Fabergé Racing ==
Barrie promoted the Brut 33 cologne and aftershave product line by sponsoring auto and motorcycle racing throughout the world during the 1970s.

=== British auto racing ===
Fabergé Racing dominated the British Saloon Car Championship in 1974 and 1975, hiring UK driver Stuart Graham who drove a green and white Brut 33 "Group 1" Chevrolet Camaro Z28.

=== British motorcycle racing ===
Fabergé Racing hired two-time 500cc Grand Prix World Champion Barry Sheene to promote the Brut cologne line with boxer Henry Cooper.

=== Australian auto racing ===
In 1973 Australian driver Allan Moffat drove a Brut 33-sponsored Ford Mustang in the 1973 Australian Touring Car Championship. Moffat won the championship 36 times. In 1974 Moffat won the Sandown 250 race driving the Brut 33 Ford Falcon GT XB.

== Faux commercial sparked Brut Productions ==
Mike Frankovich asked Barrie to create both product samples and a commercial for "Xanadu", a fictional perfume featured in his film The Love Machine. Public demand for the non-existent scent convinced Barrie that controlling product placement of Fabergé products in films and television would result in greater awareness and sales.

Barrie launched Brut Productions, initially producing feature films and television shows under that name. He then published sheet music and books under the subsidiary Brut Publications and issued recordings under Brut Records.

=== Brut Productions movies ===
Barrie was executive producer of a dozen Brut Productions movies. The 1973 film A Touch of Class (1973), starring Glenda Jackson and George Segal, was very successful, earning $8.4 million (equivalent to $60,922,039 in 2025). The film earned five Academy Award nominations including the Best Actress Oscar Jackson won for her performance in the film.

In 1973 Barrie named Ross Hunter president of Brut Productions (while remaining Chairman and CEO of the division) citing Hunter's Airport movie's success.

Other Brut Productions films were Night Watch, Whiffs (1975), Sweet Hostage (1975), Thieves (1977), Nasty Habits (1977), and Fingers (1978).

=== Brut Productions in Europe ===
To build Brut's presence in Europe, he added Roger Moore to the division's board as managing director for European production.

=== Brut Records ===
Prompted by positive reaction to the Fabergé sponsored television broadcast of "Good Vibrations from London" which aired June 28, 1972 on NBC, Barrie attempted to extend the Brut brand by creating Brut Records. Neil Bogart agreed to exclusively distribute Fabergé's music products through his Buddah Group. Brut Records' artists included Michael Franks, Sugarloaf and comedian Robert Klein.

Barrie planned to use Fabergé's over 7,000 retail cosmetic counters to advertise new Brut Records recordings, saying "We are attempting a new and innovative approach to effect better penetration for the vast existing record market".

== Lavish corporate office ==
In 1948 Barrie purchased the 5 West 54th Street mansion (known as the Dr. Moses Allen Starr Residence) from Robert Lehman for Fabergé's corporate office. The four-story building was designed by R. H. Robertson in the Italian Renaissance Revival style and was constructed between 1897 and 1899 as a private residence.

Barrie installed many luxury touches in the mansion including a "shower-for-two" and a fully appointed music room. People Magazine described Barrie's "business quarters, tailored to his taste, are a space-age vision in mirrored walls, fluorescent colors, chrome and Lucite; his gleaming black, crescent-shaped desk stands cluttered with perfumes, hairsprays and records. Nearby is his "playroom," equipped with two Baldwin pianos (there is an electric piano on Barrie's company jet), an organ, bongos and drums, where he composes and holds jam sessions. By 5 p.m., when Barrie is in town, business associates begin arriving for the ritual "happy hour," a designation Barrie rejects. 'All my hours are happy,' he insists".

Barrie used the office for the presentation of the 1971 Straw Hat Award, an award for summer theatrical productions in the United States.

=== Fabergé eggs ===
Barrie's son Richard began collecting expensive Fabergé eggs for display in the New York corporate office. From 1885 to 1917 Tsar Nicholas Alexander III commissioned Peter Carl Fabergé to create the jewel encrusted enameled eggs as Easter gifts for his wife, Empress Maria Feodorovna.

== Breast cancer detection device investor ==
In 1980 Barrie purchased a 60% stake in B.C.S.I. Laboratories, Inc., a developer of a patented (US 4624264A) breast cancer screening device. The device used a series of chemical heat sensing pads designed to be worn in a woman's bra. Major temperature differences would indicate the need for a medical consult. After extensive testing, Barrie decided the device would not sell and sold his shares in 1984.

== Academy Award and Golden Globe nominated songwriter ==
In 1972 Barrie composed the music for "The Ballad Of Billy Bullet". The song's lyrics were written by Gerry Browne. The song was written for the film Cry for Me, Billy, directed by William Graham.

Barrie and Sammy Cahn wrote the song "Amore Mio" recorded in 1972 by Dean Martin and released on Martin's 1973 album "You're the Best Thing That Ever Happened To Me".

Barrie and Cahn were nominated twice for the Academy Award for Best Original Song, first in 1973 for "All That Love Went To Waste" and in 1975 for "Now That We're In Love". "Now That We're In Love" was also nominated for the Golden Globe category "Best Original Song - Motion Picture" in 1976. Barrie wrote the music and Cahn the lyrics to both songs.

Tony Bennett recorded "All That Love Went to Waste" in November 1973. Bennett's version accompanied by the Ruby Braff–George Barnes Quartet was released as a 7" single on the Brut Records label.

Barrie wrote the music, Cahn the English lyrics and Pat Noto the Italian lyrics for the song "Now Is Forever" used in Brut Productions' 1978 film Fingers directed by James Toback. Jerry Vale performed the song in the film and released a single on Buddha Records.

== Buyout and retirement ==
During buyout negotiations in 1982 it was reported Fabergé had earned $269.5 million (equivalent to $899,107,759 in 2025) that year.

In 1984 Barrie retired after the Fabergé board endorsed a leveraged buyout of the company. Barrie, then chairman of the board, agreed to terminate his contract, accepting $500,000 immediately and an additional $300,000 for nine years as well as his contractual retirement benefits. In 1982 he received a salary and bonuses of $1.12 million (equivalent to $4,003,448 in 2025).

=== Straight Inc. ===
In 1987 Barrie was a member of the national board of directors of Straight Inc., at the time a drug rehabilitation program for adolescents. He solicited $75,000 from the Los Angeles chapter of Variety Clubs International, helping found a Straight Inc. treatment center there.

== Personal life ==
He was married four times, twice and last to Dorothy Barrie. Barrie had three children: Caryl Barrie Kaplan, Richard Barrie, and Craig Barrie.

== Accolades ==
- 1973: Academy Award for Best Original Song Nominee – "All That Love Went to Waste" (music)
- 1975: Academy Award for Best Original Song Nominee – "Now That We're in Love" (music)
- 1976: ShoWest Award – Producer of the Year
- 1976: Golden Globe for Best Original Song Nominee – "Now That We're in Love" (music)
