= Black Market Baby (film) =

1977 American made-for-television film

- Genre: Drama
- Based on: Black Market Baby by Elizabeth Christman
- Teleplay by: Andrew Peter Marin
- Directed by: Robert Day (as Robert F. Day)
- Starring: Linda Purl; Desi Arnaz Jr. Jessica Walter; Tom Bosley; David Doyle; Bill Bixby
- Country of origin: United States
- Original language: English

Production
- Executive producer: James Green
- Producer: Milton Sperling
- Production location: San Francisco
- Cinematography: Richard C. Glouner
- Editor: George Jay Nicholson
- Running time: 96 minutes
- Production company: Brut Productions

Original release
- Network: ABC
- Release: October 7, 1977

Black Market Baby is a 1977 American film directed by Robert Day. It was the second TV movie made by Brut Productions, the first being Sweet Hostage.

== Plot ==
A childless couple persuade a college student to have their child.

== Cast ==
- Linda Purl as Anne Macarino
- Desi Arnaz Jr. as Steve Aletti
- Jessica Walter as Louise Carmino
- David Doyle as Joseph Carmino
- Tom Bosley as Dr. Andrew Brantford
- Bill Bixby as Herbert Freemont
- Lucille Benson as Mrs. Krieg
- Annie Potts as Linda Cleary
- Tracy Brooks Swope as Babs
- Allen Joseph as Albert Macarino
- Mark Thomas as Mario Macarino
- Argentina Brunetti as Aunt Imelda

== Reception ==
The Los Angeles Times called it "outstanding in all respects".

It was the 36th highest rated show of the week.
