= List of 20th Century Studios theatrical animated feature films =

Logo of 20th Century Studios (representing 20th Century Animation)

This list of theatrical animated feature films consists of animated films produced or released by 20th Century Studios, a subsidiary of The Walt Disney Company.

20th Century releases films from 20th Century-owned and non-20th Century owned animation studios. Most films listed below are from 20th Century Animation, which produced its first feature-length animated film Anastasia in 1997, and Blue Sky Studios which began as a feature animation department of 20th Century Animation, producing its first feature-length animated film Ice Age in 2002. Beginning with Hugo the Hippo in 1975, 20th Century has released animated films by other production companies, such as DreamWorks Animation (which is now owned by Universal Pictures).

Other studio units have also released films theatrically, primarily 20th Century Animation's first in-house subsidiary Fox Animation Studios which only produced two theatrical feature films, the aforementioned Anastasia and Titan A.E. before being closed in 2000, and the studio's distribution unit, which acquires film rights from outside animation studios to release films under the 20th Century Studios, or Searchlight Pictures film labels.

== Films ==
Color legend
Fox Family Films (1997); 20th Century Fox Animation (2000–2019); 20th Century Animation (2020–present)	
Fox Animation Studios (1997–2000)	
DreamWorks Animation (2013–2017); (rights now owned by Universal Pictures)	
Blue Sky Studios (2002–2019)	
Other Fox studio (1975–2020); Other 20th Century Studio films (2020–present)	
Other studio	
An adult animated production	^{A}
Live-action/animation hybrid	^{S}
Distribution only	^{D}

=== American releases ===
Title	Original theatrical release date (Note: Listed are the original theatrical release dates in the United States (or other non-U.S. territories) when the film was contributed by 20th Century. Different distributors are attributed and credited for distributing each film throughout the history of 20th Century.)	Animation studio
Hugo the Hippo^{[D]}	January 23, 1976	Brut Productions and Pannónia Filmstúdió (Note: Owned by Warner Bros. (via Turner Entertainment Co.))
Wizards^{[D]}	February 9, 1977	Bakshi Productions
Raggedy Ann & Andy: A Musical Adventure^{[D]}	April 1, 1977	The Bobbs-Merrill Company, Lester Osterman Productions and Richard Williams Productions (Note: Owned by Kohlberg Kravis Roberts through Simon & Schuster; currently unavailable for distribution)
Fire and Ice^{[D]}	August 26, 1983	Aspen Productions, Film Finance Group and Producers Sales Organization (Note: Owned by AMBI Group (via Exclusive Media), with home media distribution licensed to Blue Underground)
FernGully: The Last Rainforest^{[D]}	April 10, 1992	Kroyer Films and FAI Films (Note: Owned by Machine Media Advisors, with distribution rights currently licensed to Shout! Studios)
Once Upon a Forest^{[D]}	June 18, 1993	Hanna-Barbera, Endangered Film Company and HTV Cymru/Wales
The Pagemaster^{[S]}^{[D]}	November 23, 1994	Turner Feature Animation
Anastasia	November 21, 1997	Fox Family Films and Fox Animation Studios
Titan A.E.	June 16, 2000	20th Century Fox Animation and Fox Animation Studios
Digimon: The Movie	October 6, 2000	Saban Entertainment and Toei Animation (Note: Owned by Toei Animation, with U.S. distribution rights licensed to Discotek Media)
Waking Life^{[A]}	October 19, 2001	Thousand Words (Note: Released by Fox Searchlight Pictures.)
Ice Age	March 15, 2002	20th Century Fox Animation and Blue Sky Studios
Robots	March 11, 2005	20th Century Fox Animation and Blue Sky Studios
Ice Age: The Meltdown	March 31, 2006	20th Century Fox Animation and Blue Sky Studios
Everyone's Hero^{[D]}	September 15, 2006	IDT Entertainment
The Simpsons Movie^{[A]}	July 27, 2007	20th Century Fox Animation and Gracie Films
Horton Hears a Who!	March 14, 2008	20th Century Fox Animation and Blue Sky Studios
Space Chimps^{[D]}	July 18, 2008	Vanguard Animation and Starz Animation (Note: Owned by Lionsgate)
Ice Age: Dawn of the Dinosaurs	July 1, 2009	20th Century Fox Animation and Blue Sky Studios
Fantastic Mr. Fox	November 13, 2009	20th Century Fox Animation, Regency Enterprises, Indian Paintbrush, and American Empirical Pictures
Rio	April 15, 2011	20th Century Fox Animation and Blue Sky Studios
Ice Age: Continental Drift	July 13, 2012	20th Century Fox Animation and Blue Sky Studios
The Croods^{[D]}	March 22, 2013	DreamWorks Animation (Note: Owned by Universal Pictures (via DreamWorks Animation))
Cheech & Chong's Animated Movie^{[D]}^{[A]}	March 18, 2013	Houston Curtis Productions
Epic	May 24, 2013	20th Century Fox Animation and Blue Sky Studios
Turbo^{[D]}	July 17, 2013	DreamWorks Animation
Walking with Dinosaurs^{[S]}^{[D]}	December 20, 2013	Animal Logic
Mr. Peabody & Sherman^{[D]}	March 7, 2014	DreamWorks Animation and PDI/DreamWorks
Rio 2	April 11, 2014	20th Century Fox Animation and Blue Sky Studios
How to Train Your Dragon 2^{[D]}	June 13, 2014	DreamWorks Animation
The Book of Life^{[D]}	October 17, 2014	20th Century Fox Animation and Reel FX Animation Studios
Penguins of Madagascar^{[D]}	November 26, 2014	DreamWorks Animation and PDI/DreamWorks
Home^{[D]}	March 27, 2015	DreamWorks Animation
The Peanuts Movie	November 6, 2015	20th Century Fox Animation and Blue Sky Studios
Kung Fu Panda 3^{[D]}	January 29, 2016	DreamWorks Animation and Oriental DreamWorks
Ice Age: Collision Course	July 22, 2016	20th Century Fox Animation and Blue Sky Studios
Trolls^{[D]}	November 4, 2016	DreamWorks Animation
The Boss Baby^{[D]}	March 31, 2017	DreamWorks Animation
Captain Underpants: The First Epic Movie^{[D]}	June 2, 2017	DreamWorks Animation and Scholastic Entertainment
Ferdinand	December 15, 2017	20th Century Fox Animation, Blue Sky Studios and Davis Entertainment
Isle of Dogs^{[A]}	March 23, 2018	20th Century Fox Animation, Indian Paintbrush, American Empirical Pictures, and Babelsberg Studio
Spies in Disguise	December 25, 2019	20th Century Fox Animation, Blue Sky Studios and Chernin Entertainment
Ron's Gone Wrong^{[D]}	October 22, 2021	20th Century Animation and Locksmith Animation
The Bob's Burgers Movie^{[A]}	May 27, 2022	20th Century Animation, Wilo Productions and Bento Box Entertainment

=== International releases ===
Title	Original theatrical release date (Note: Listed are the original theatrical release dates in the United States (or other non-U.S. territories) when the film was contributed by 20th Century. Different distributors are attributed and credited for distributing each film throughout the history of 20th Century.)	Animation studio
Tarzoon: Shame of the Jungle^{[A]}	September 4, 1975 (France)	Picha
Fritz the Cat^{[A]}	June 23, 1977 (Australia)	Krantz Films and Fritz Productions (Note: Domestically owned by Metro-Goldwyn-Mayer.)
The Big Bang^{[A]}	March 18, 1987 (France)	Picha
Asterix Conquers America	August 11, 1995	Extrafilm Produktion GmbH
The Magic Pudding	December 14, 2000 (Australia)	Energee Entertainment
Magos y Gigantes	November 19, 2003	Ánima Estudios
The Happy Cricket and the Giant Bugs	January 9, 2009	Start Desenhos Animados
Dragon Ball Z: Battle of Gods	March 30, 2013	Toei Animation
Worms	December 20, 2013 (Brazil)	Globo Filmes (Note: Released by Fox International Productions.)
Dragon Ball Z: Resurrection 'F'	April 18, 2015	Toei Animation
Condorito: The Movie	October 12, 2017	Aronnax Studios
Dragon Ball Super: Broly	December 14, 2018	Toei Animation

=== Upcoming ===
Title	Intended theatrical release date by 20th Century Studios	Animation studio
Ice Age: Boiling Point	February 5, 2027	20th Century Animation
The New Simpsons Movie^{[A]}	September 3, 2027	20th Century Animation and Gracie Films

== Highest grossing films ==
This list does not include films combining live-action with animation.

Rank	Film	Worldwide Gross	Studio	Year	Ref.
1	Ice Age: Dawn of the Dinosaurs	$886,686,817	Blue Sky Studios	2009	
2	Ice Age: Continental Drift	$877,244,782	Blue Sky Studios	2012	
3	Ice Age: The Meltdown	$660,940,780	Blue Sky Studios	2006	
4	How to Train Your Dragon 2	$621,537,519	DreamWorks Animation	2014	
5	The Croods	$587,204,668	DreamWorks Animation	2013	
6	The Boss Baby	$527,965,936	DreamWorks Animation	2017	
7	The Simpsons Movie	$527,071,022	20th Century Fox Animation	2007	
8	Kung Fu Panda 3	$521,170,825	DreamWorks Animation	2016	
9	Rio 2	$500,101,972	Blue Sky Studios	2014	
10	Rio	$483,866,772	Blue Sky Studios	2011	

== See also ==
- Lists of 20th Century Studios films
- List of Disney theatrical animated feature films
- 20th Century Animation § Original films and co-productions
- Fox Animation Studios § Work
- List of Blue Sky Studios productions
- List of Walt Disney Animation Studios films
- List of Pixar films

== Notes ==
Release Notes

Studio/Production Notes

Film rights Notes
