= Robert Lawrence (film editor) =

Canadian film editor

- Born: November 9, 1913; Montreal, Quebec, Canada
- Died: September 19, 2004 (aged 90); Madison, Wisconsin, United States
- Occupation: Film editor
- Years active: 1953–1987

Robert Lawrence (November 9, 1913 – September 19, 2004) was a Canadian film editor who was nominated at the 33rd Academy Awards in the category of Best Film Editing for the film Spartacus.

== Filmography ==
- Stalag 17 (1953) (assistant editor) (uncredited)
- Man of Conflict (1953)
- Giant (1956) (uncredited)
- Hot Rod Rumble (1957) (associate editor)
- Anna Lucasta (1958) (uncredited)
- City of Fear (1959)
- Day of the Outlaw (1959)
- Tokyo After Dark (1959)
- Spartacus (1960)
- El Cid (1961)
- 55 Days at Peking (1963)
- A Carol for Another Christmas (1964)
- The Fall of the Roman Empire (1964)
- Is Paris Burning? (1966)
- Buona Sera, Mrs. Campbell (1968) (editorial supervisor)
- Uptight (1968)
- Loving (1970)
- Promise at Dawn (1970)
- Fiddler on the Roof (1971)
- Up the Sandbox (1972)
- S*P*Y*S (1974)
- Whiffs (1975)
- I Will, I Will... for Now (1976)
- Fingers (1978)
- Exposed (1983)
- Never Say Never Again (1983) (supervising editor)
- Fort Saganne (1984)
- Warning Sign (1985)
- 8 Million Ways to Die (1986)
- Rent-a-Cop (1987)
