= Fabergé (cosmetics) =

Defunct American perfumes and cosmetics brand

Fabergé Parfums / Fabergé Inc
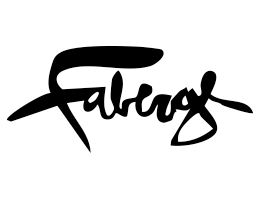
- Founded: 1937; 89 years ago
- Founder: Samuel Rubin
- Defunct: 2007; 19 years ago
- Successor: Faberge UK Limited

Fabergé Parfums (French: [fabɛʁʒe]) was a brand name of perfumes and cosmetics registered by American Samuel Rubin in 1937 without the Fabergé family's permission. Rubin was sued and paid the family for the use of their name but it was only $25,000.

Rubin's cosmetics company sold perfume and cosmetics bearing the name Fabergé and Fabergé Parfum which were manufactured under Rubin until 1964 and George Barrie (between 1964 and 1984). Sold by Barrie in 1984, the company was eventually purchased by Unilever who marketed its use across a large range of general merchandise including clothing and personal care products.

Originally founded in 1842 in Russia, the House of Fabergé grew under Peter Carl Fabergé's leadership until the Russian Revolution, and continued in Paris as Fabergé & Cie, founded by Peter Carl's sons, and was making jewellery in France until 2001.

In 2007, investment company Pallinghurst Resources consolidated the Fabergé trademarks in order to re-establish the 21st century luxury jewellery company Faberge UK Limited and established the Faberge Heritage Council.

In 2025, Fabergé UK Limited was acquired by SMG Capital LLC for $50 million, an investment company owned by London-based Russian entrepreneur Sergei Mosunov.

== History ==
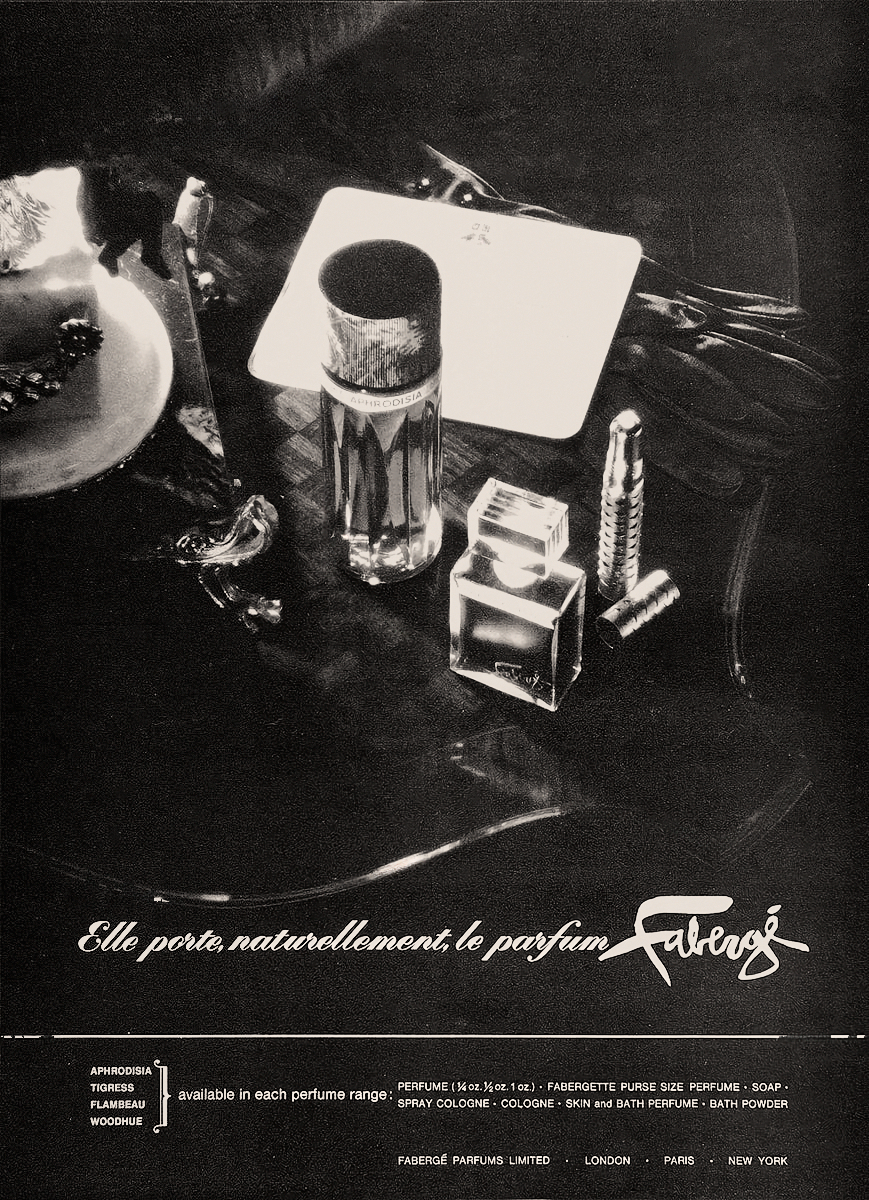
Faberge Parfums advertisement, 1955.

=== Samuel Rubin ===
American oil tycoon Armand Hammer acquired many objects made by the original House of Fabergé during the 1920s in communist Russia, including Fabergé eggs. In 1937, Hammer's friend Samuel Rubin, owner of the Spanish Trading Corporation (which imported soap and olive oil), closed his company due to the Spanish Civil War and established a new enterprise to manufacture perfumes and toiletries. Rubin registered his new firm in 1937 as Fabergé Inc., at Hammer's suggestion.

The Fabergé family did not learn about this until after World War II ended. Unable to afford protracted and expensive litigation, they settled out of court in 1951, for US$25,000 (equal to $310,096 today) for the Fabergé name to be used in connection with perfume. Soon, Rubin added cosmetics and toiletries under the Fabergé banner, usually sold in upscale department stores. Fabergé had a high-prestige status, similar to its rivals Coty, Guerlain and Elizabeth Arden.

=== George Barrie ===
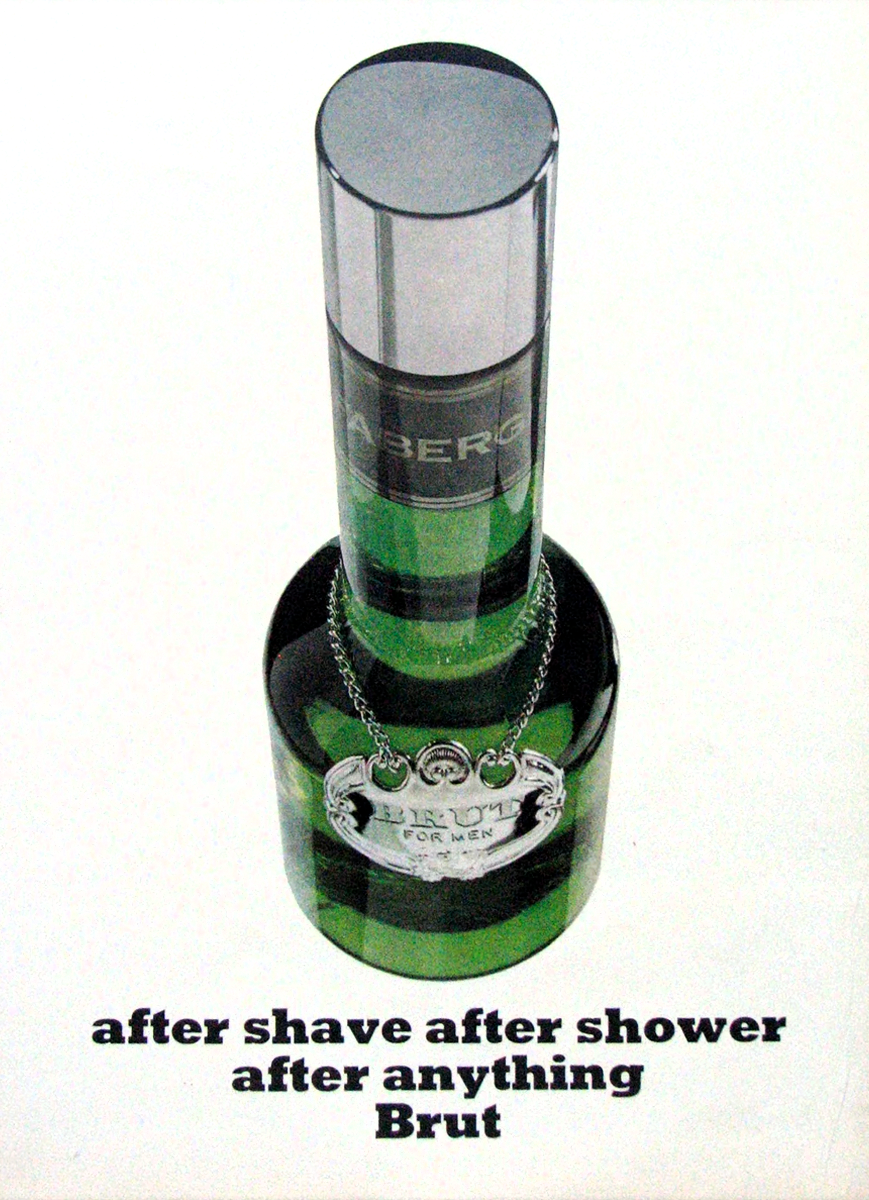
Faberge parfums Brut33 advertisement, 1967.

In 1964, Rubin sold Fabergé Inc. for $26 million to George Barrie and the Rayette cosmetics company. In 1964, Rayette changed its name to Rayette-Fabergé Inc., then in 1971, the company name was changed again to Fabergé Inc. From 1964 to 1984, under the direction of Barrie, Fabergé launched many successful cosmetics products and hired celebrities to endorse them. In addition, a media division made feature movies.

Barrie supervised the introduction of the popular Brut toiletry line for Fabergé, which was promoted by football players Joe Namath, Paul Gascoigne and Kevin Keegan, as well as boxer Henry Cooper and actress Kelly LeBrock, among others. Brut became the best-selling cologne in the world at that time.

In 1967, movie star Cary Grant was appointed as a "creative consultant" to Rayette-Fabergé. He spent a year attending sales conventions and visited Fabergé plants around the world. In May 1968, Grant was elected as a member of Fabergé's board of directors. He received a salary of $15,000 per year, a rent-paid luxury apartment in New York City (where Fabergé's HQ was located), unlimited travel expenses and use of the company's private fleet of planes and helicopters. By 1970, Grant divided his time between Los Angeles and New York. He never endorsed specific products or appeared in commercials.

In 1970, future James Bond actor Roger Moore became another celebrity board member. Also in 1970, Barrie established Fabergé's film-making division, Brut Productions, which produced the Academy Award-winning movie A Touch of Class in 1973, and other feature movies.

Barrie launched the 'Babe' fragrance in 1976 which, in its first year, became Fabergé's largest-selling women's fragrance worldwide. The granddaughter of writer Ernest Hemingway, model and actress Margaux Hemingway, received a $1 million contract to promote the 'Babe by Fabergé' perfume in a very popular advertising campaign. Her famous Babe campaign was remembered again by millions after her mysterious death in 1996. Babe received two awards from the Fragrance Foundation for its launch – 'Most Successful Introduction of a Women's Fragrance in Popular Distribution' and 'Best Advertising Campaign for Women's Fragrance'.

In 1977, Barrie launched the Farrah Fawcett hair product and fragrance lines, and he signed the actress and star of Charlie's Angels to a promotional contract with Fabergé. A famous Fabergé TV ad featured Joe Namath being shaved by Farrah Fawcett.

By 1984, the company had expanded its personal care products to Aphrodisia, Aqua Net Hair Spray, Babe, Cavale, Brut, Ceramic Nail glaze, Flambeau, Great Skin, Grande Finale, Just Wonderful, Macho, Kiku, Partage, Tip Top Accessories, Tigress, Woodhue, Xandu, Zizanie de Fragonard, Caryl Richards, Farrah Fawcett, and Fabergé Organics.

=== Meshulam Riklis ===
In 1984, McGregor Corporation (controlled by Israeli financier Meshulam Riklis), the marketer of Botany 500 clothing, acquired Fabergé and discontinued many Fabergé-branded products. The company launched Mcgregor by Fabergé cologne the same year. New product lines were introduced, including men's, women's and children's apparel under the trademarks Billy the Kid, Scoreboard and Wonderknit.

In 1986, Mark Goldston, a specialist in evaluating areas of untapped sales and profit, was named president of Fabergé. He was principally responsible for targeting and acquiring Elizabeth Arden from Eli Lilly and Company. In 1988, Fabergé bought Sea & Ski.

=== Unilever ===
In 1989, an American subsidiary of Unilever bought Fabergé Inc. (along with Elizabeth Arden) for US$1.55 billion. The chairman of Unilever stated that the acquisition would increase the size of Unilever's personal products business by more than 25 percent.

In 2001, Lever Fabergé was formed through the merger of Lever Brothers and Elida Fabergé, two long-established Unilever companies. Lever Fabergé today owns hundreds of cosmetics, household and other brands, including Dove, Impulse, Sure, Axe, Organics, Timotei, Signal, Comfort, Domestos, Surf, Sun, and Cif. Unilever removed the Fabergé name from all of its products and packaging. Brut is now marketed in Europe by Brut Parfums Prestige.

== Change of business ==
On January 3, 2007, Pallinghurst Resources (now Gemfields), an investment advisory firm based in London, announced that it had acquired Unilever's entire global portfolio of trademarks, licences and associated rights relating to the Fabergé brand name for an undisclosed sum. The trademarks, licences and associated rights were transferred to a newly constituted company, named Fabergé UK Limited, which was registered in the Cayman Islands.

In October 2007, the company announced that it intended to restore Fabergé to its rightful position as a leading purveyor of enduring and endearing personal possessions. Furthermore, it announced the reunification of the Fabergé brand and the Fabergé family, with Tatiana Fabergé and Sarah Fabergé (both great-granddaughters of Peter Carl Fabergé) becoming founding members of the Fabergé Heritage Council, a division of Fabergé UK Limited that was to offer counsel to the new company. Mark Dunhill became the CEO in 2007, and the company launched its 'Haute Couture' jewellery collection in 2009.

Since then, Fabergé has operated as a luxury brand specialising in jewellery made with precious and semi-precious stones, as well as egg objet, with guaranteed provenance and ethical sourcing of the stones.

In 2025, it was announced that SMG Capital LLC had completed the purchase of Fabergé UK Limited for $50 million.

== Perfume Advertising ==
The cologne Brut 33 by Fabergé had a product placement in the 1974 James Bond movie The Man with the Golden Gun. During a fight in the dancer's dressing room, Roger Moore sprays two of the villains in the face with an aerosol can of what is Brut-33 anti-perspirant, a nod to the Fabergé company with which Moore was associated.

Limited licences to endorse products with the Fabergé name were given to Barbie, Limoges, The Franklin Mint and others.
