= Aqua Net =

Hair spray brand

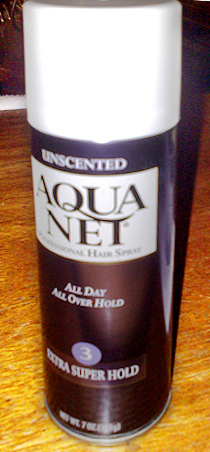
- An Aqua Net spray can
- Product type: Hair spray
- Current owner: Lornamead, Inc. (Meiyume)
- Introduced: 1950s
- Ambassadors: The Three Stooges, Donna Mills

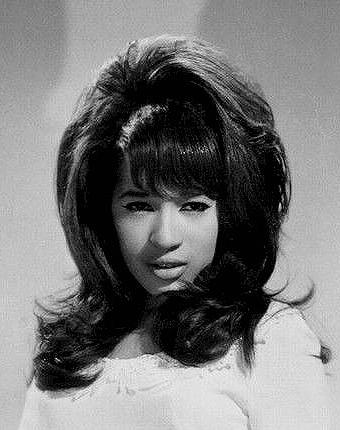
"We had high hair anyway... We used a lot of Aqua Net." - Ronnie Spector of The Ronettes

I dyed my hair platinum blond; Leah liked to help me fluff it up by teasing it and using Aqua Net hairspray—it would be just towering, six to eight inches high...

— Vince Neil of Mötley Crüe

Aqua Net is an American brand of aerosol hair spray created by Rayette of St. Paul, Minnesota. The company brought the product to retail stores in 1961. By 1964, hairspray had become the top-selling beauty product in America. The brand is known for its distinctive large purple spray cans, and the spray itself is known for its strong hold and distinctive odor.

== History ==
Aqua Net was invented by the Rayette Company of St. Paul, Minnesota in the 1950s. Rayette was founded by chemist Raymond E. Lee in 1935, and specialized in professional hair care products including shampoo and hair coloring as well as curlers, dryers, rollers, brushes, and hairnets. By 1959, the company had annual sales of over $11 million. Mark L. Arend and George Barrie took over the firm in 1959. Barrie immediately began an aggressive marketing campaign and increased sales by 700%. The company acquired Fabergé in 1963 for $20 million. Sources differ on its availability around this time. One source describes it as being initially available only in hair salons and not offered directly for sale to the public until the late 1950s. Another states that this change happened in 1961. Yet another says that it was on the market as early as 1953, but does not specify whether that included direct sale to the public, or only to salons. Regardless of how they obtained it, those who did have access to it in the 1950s and 1960s found it suitable for facilitating the bouffant hairstyles popular in those decades, such as the beehive.

In the 1960s, Aqua Net was advertised by The Three Stooges.

In the 1980s, a renewed trend for big hair, and the rise of glam rock and hair metal bands like Mötley Crüe and Cinderella resulted in the widespread use of hair spray in mainstream and alternative culture alike. Aqua Net became synonymous with these trends during that decade. In the 1980s, Aqua Net was advertised by Donna Mills.

Around January 1989, Fabergé entered talks to sell a number of brands, including Aqua Net, to Unilever. The sale was completed in February 1989.

In 1989–1992, Aqua Net was the subject of a product safety lawsuit, Nowak v. Faberge USA, that has since entered legal textbooks.

In the 1990s, Aqua Net was used by punk musicians such as Lars Fredriksen and Michelle Cruz Gonzales.

The brand was acquired from Unilever in 2006 by Lornamead, Inc. Lornamead instigated a rebranding effort intended to reference the product's heritage by reviving parts of its original design elements. Li & Fung acquired Lornamead in 2012. Lornamead is currently part of Meiyume, owned by a joint venture between the Fung Group and Hony Capital called LH Pegasus.

== Composition and health effects ==
Aqua Net's ingredients include dimethyl ether, SD alcohol 40-B, and aminomethyl propanol.

From at least 1970 through 1972, during a period in which it was manufactured by Fabergé, Aqua Net contained vinyl chloride as a propellant. Vinyl chloride exposure is associated with a raised risk of certain liver cancers.

In 2002, during the period in which it was manufactured by Unilever, Aqua Net was reported to contain the phthalates dibutyl phthalate (DBP) and diethyl phthalate (DEP). Pthalates are associated with male reproductive dysfunction.

== Alternative uses ==
Besides hairstyling, Aqua Net has been used:

- as a fixative in microbiology, typically during staining procedures;
- as a fixative for charcoal or pastel artworks;
- by ballerinas, to reduce slippage of pointe shoe ribbons;
- for stiffening or straightening crinolines, skirts and tulle;
- as a solvent for un-gluing hair extensions;
- as a stain remover for makeup;
- as an insect killer;
- as a propellant in potato cannons;
- as an inhalant in recreational substance abuse;
- as a lubricant and fixative for installing tool handles and handlebar grips;
- for increasing print adhesion in 3D Printing.

== In popular culture ==
- In the film After Hours (1985), the beehive-wearing, 1960s-obsessed character Julie is shown to have a large backup supply of Aqua Net.
- In the film When Harry Met Sally... (1989), Sally Albright uses Aqua Net on her Farrah Fawcett-style hairdo. The use of a well-known product with a strong "set" may have been chosen by the film's writers in order to add a subtext.
- In the television series Mad Men (2009), the lead characters' advertising agency pitches for the Aqua Net account.
- The song AquaNet by Yelawolf
