= I Will, I Will... for Now =

1976 film by Norman Panama

- Directed by: Norman Panama
- Written by: Norman Panama; Albert E. Lewin
- Produced by: George Barrie
- Starring: Elliott Gould; Diane Keaton; Paul Sorvino
- Cinematography: John A. Alonzo
- Edited by: Robert Lawrence
- Music by: John Cameron
- Production company: Brut Productions
- Distributed by: 20th Century Fox
- Release date: February 18, 1976; (New York)
- Running time: 107 min.
- Country: United States
- Language: English
- Box office: $1,740,000 (worldwide)

I Will, I Will... for Now is a 1976 American romantic-comedy film starring Elliott Gould, Diane Keaton and Paul Sorvino. Released in 1976 by Twentieth Century-Fox, it is the last feature film directed by Norman Panama.

== Plot ==
The marriage of Les and Katie Bingham is in big trouble. They've already split up once, and now they're giving it one more try, but the bedroom of their New York apartment is not a happy place. Les finds her too cold. Katie finds him too fast.

The Binghams weigh the opinions of lawyer Lou, who also has a romantic interest in Katie. There's also temptation for Les in the form of sexy neighbor Jackie, who gives him a copy of "The Joy of Sex" as a gift. But as soon as he tries out one of the positions in it, Les throws out his back.

The couple takes one last desperate try to revive their passion and save their relationship. They travel to California to join a sex-therapy group, where much goes wrong, but all ends well.

== Cast ==
- Elliott Gould as Les Bingham
- Diane Keaton as Katie Bingham
- Paul Sorvino as Lou Springer
- Victoria Principal as Jackie Martin
- Robert Alda as Dr. Magnus
- Warren Berlinger as Steve Martin
- Candy Clark as Sally Bingham

== Production ==
The film was based on an original script by Norman Panama and Alfred Lewin. It was made by Brut Productions the short lived film company of Faberge, headed by George Barrie. When Ross Hunter took over as president of the company in December 1973, he listed the film as among his potential projects.

Hunter left the company after only a few months but in December 1974 Barrie said Brut would make the film. "We think it is a very funny, new wrinkle on marriage," said Barrie. He said the film was about a separated couple who reunite at their daughter's wedding. The wedding ceremony involves reading out a clause with options for renewal or dissolution of the marriage. The couple decide to try again using this arrangement.

Barrie wanted Paul Newman and Glenda Jackson to star.

Norman Panama had made Brut's most successful film to date, A Touch of Class. "I'm hoping lightning will strike twice", said Barrie.

By January 1975 Elliott Gould, who had just made Whiffs for Brut, agreed to star.

== Reception ==
Roger Ebert of the Chicago Sun-Times gave the film one star out of four and wrote, "The film moves at a leaden pace, interrupted only by its dead halts, and the actors stand around looking appalled at themselves after being forced to recite dialog like, 'I still love that hard-nosed little dumpling.' There will be worse movies this year, but probably none so stupefying." Richard Eder of The New York Times called the film "a stale 1950s poundcake of a movie" that "should make people happy that they don't make movies like that any more." Arthur D. Murphy of Variety described the film as "passable contemporary fluff." Gene Siskel of the Chicago Tribune gave the film two stars out of four and called it a "tired sex comedy" with humor "about as modern as a whoopee cushion." Charles Champlin of the Los Angeles Times panned the film as a "tone-deaf and grimly forced" attempt to update the screwball comedy formula, though he added that "the movie is almost worth seeing just for the pleasure of gazing upon Ms. Keaton who is beautiful, intelligent, warm, amusing and sympathetic." Gary Arnold of The Washington Post wrote, "Gould and Keaton are no negligible screen personalities or comic performers, so it's especially agonizing to see them trapped inside of an antiquated laugh-provoking machine." John Pym of The Monthly Film Bulletin wrote, "A relentless flow of innuendo, limp wisecracks and an attempted tone of sexual sophistication (buttressed by a series of ludicrously opulent sets) suggest that I Will...I Will... For Now was derived from some rejected Doris Day—Rock Hudson script of the Fifties."

Gould said the film "was almost fully not realized" but had "an interesting story and idea. I wouldn’t have necessarily cast Paul Sorvino in that part, but I love Paul Sorvino, I love his family. And anytime I can work with Diane Keaton is a great bonus for me.”
