= Elliott Gould =

American actor (born 1938)

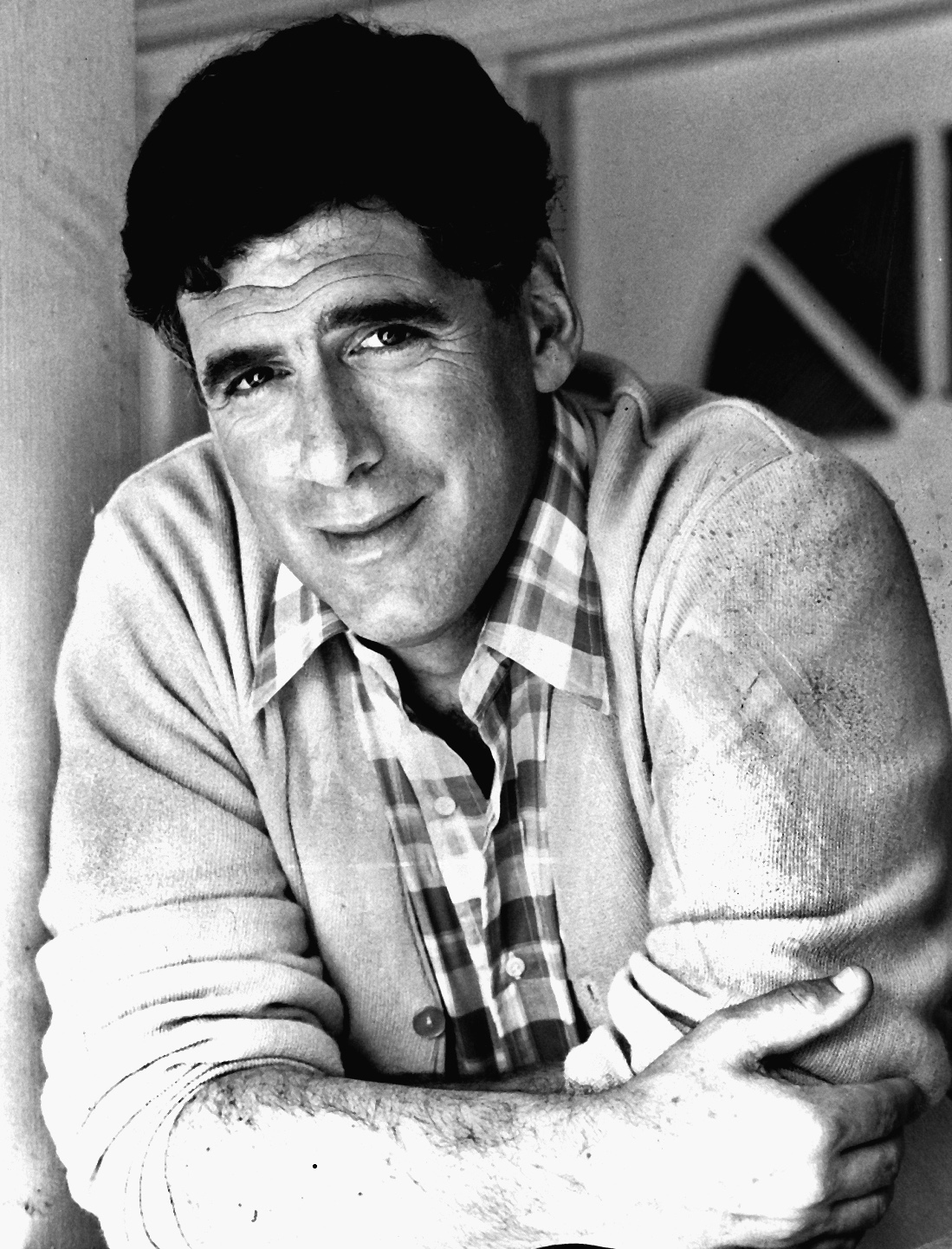
- Gould in 1986
- Born: Elliott Goldstein; August 29, 1938 (age 88); New York City, U.S.
- Occupation: Actor
- Years active: 1964–present
- Spouses: Barbra Streisand (m. 1963; div. 1971); Jennifer Bogart (m. 1973; div. 1975) (m. 1978; div. 1989)
- Children: 3, including Jason
- Relatives: Paul Bogart (former father-in-law)

Elliott Gould (/ɡuːld/; né Goldstein; born August 29, 1938) is an American actor.

Gould's breakthrough role was in the film Bob & Carol & Ted & Alice (1969), for which he received a nomination for the Academy Award for Best Supporting Actor. The following year, he starred as Capt. Trapper John McIntyre in the Robert Altman film M*A*S*H (1970), for which he received nominations for a BAFTA Award and Golden Globe Award. Gould continued working with Altman in The Long Goodbye (1973) and California Split (1974). Other notable film roles include Getting Straight (1970), Alan Arkin's Little Murders (1971), Ingmar Bergman's The Touch (1971), Richard Attenborough's A Bridge Too Far (1977), Capricorn One (1978), The Silent Partner (1978), Barry Levinson's Bugsy (1991), American History X (1998), Steven Soderbergh's Contagion (2011), and Ruby Sparks (2012). He also starred as Reuben Tishkoff in the Ocean's film series (2001, 2004, 2007, and 2018).

Gould is a member of Saturday Night Live's Five Timers' Club, having hosted six times from 1976 to 1980. He is also known on television for his recurring roles as Jack Geller on the NBC sitcom Friends (1994–2004) and Ezra Goldman in the Showtime series Ray Donovan (2013–2016).

== Early life ==
Gould was born in Bensonhurst, Brooklyn, New York City. His mother, Lucille (née Raver), sold artificial flowers to beauty shops, and his father, Bernard Goldstein, worked in the garment business as a textiles buyer. His family is Jewish of Russian-Jewish, Polish-Jewish and Lithuanian-Jewish descent. He graduated from the Professional Children's School.

== Career ==
=== Early roles ===
Gould began acting on Broadway in the late 1950s, making his professional debut in a minor role in the musical Rumple (1957). The musical starred Eddie Foy Jr., Gretchen Wyler, and Stephen Douglass with music and lyrics by Ernest G. Schweikert and Frank Reardon. He followed this with small parts in successful productions such as the Betty Comden and Adolph Green musical Say, Darling (1958–59) featuring Robert Morse, David Wayne, and Vivian Blaine. He also appeared in the French musical Irma La Douce (1960–61) with Elizabeth Seal and Clive Revill.

=== 1960s ===
In 1962, Gould had a starring role in the Broadway production of I Can Get It for You Wholesale, which ran for 300 performances and where he met future wife Barbra Streisand. Following that, he landed prominent roles in Drat! The Cat! (1965) and in Little Murders (1971). He was also cast in A Way of Life by Murray Schisgal but walked out before the play made it to Broadway.

Gould made his feature film debut in the William Dieterle comedy Quick, Let's Get Married (1964) starring Ginger Rogers, Ray Milland, and Barbara Eden. The film was an attempt to revitalize Rogers' career, but did not get a full release until 1971. In the film Gould plays a mute character. He received star billing for his performance. Gould's next film appearance was in William Friedkin's musical comedy film The Night They Raided Minsky's (1968) produced by Norman Lear. The film gives a fictional account of the invention of the striptease at Minsky's Burlesque in 1925. The film also starred Jason Robards, Denholm Elliott, and Jack Burns.

In January 1969, Gould announced he had formed his own film production company with Jack Brodsky, Brodsky-Gould Productions. The company would make two films: The Assistant, based on a novel by Bernard Malamud, and Little Murders. (The Assistant was never produced.) In April 1970, Brodsky and Gould announced plans to make The Dick, from the novel by Bruce Jay Friedman, but it was never made. That same year, Gould reached a new level of prominence playing one of the four leads in Paul Mazursky's zeitgeisty social comedy Bob & Carol & Ted & Alice starring alongside Natalie Wood, Robert Culp, and Dyan Cannon. Gould played Ted Henderson. The film was released in September 1969. The film was a critical and financial success. In Roger Ebert's review in the Chicago Sun-Times, he wrote that "Gould emerges, not so much a star, more of a 'personality,' like Severn Darden or Estelle Parsons. He's very funny." For his performance, Gould earned a nomination for the Academy Award for Best Supporting Actor losing to Gig Young for They Shoot Horses, Don't They? "I'm the hottest thing in Hollywood right now", he said in October 1969.

=== 1970s ===
In March 1969, Gould signed a non-exclusive, four-picture contract with 20th Century Fox, the first of which was to be Robert Altman's M*A*S*H and the second Move both released in 1970. His first film released after Bob & Carol was the wartime satire M*A*S*H (1970), directed by Robert Altman, where Gould played Trapper John McIntyre. It was a huge hit at the box office and was nominated for the Academy Award for Best Picture. The Hollywood Reporter film critic John Mahoney wrote in his review "If Elliott Gould keeps selecting and performing in films the way he has thus far, people may start going to pictures just because he is in them." With significant successes of Bob & Carol & Ted & Alice and M*A*S*H, Gould appeared on the cover of Time magazine that year, where he was described as a "star for an uptight age".

Gould's other films of 1970 included the Richard Rush directed comedy-drama film Getting Straight, where he played a Vietnam veteran who gets involved in student protests. Candice Bergen also stars as his girlfriend. The film was not as popular as the other two movies, but it was nonetheless still considered a success – the only student protest film to make money – and cemented Gould's place as one of the biggest film stars in the country. Also released that year was Move (1970), co-starring Paula Prentiss, which was his first critical and commercial flop. Also unsuccessful was I Love My Wife (1970), with Brenda Vaccaro, for which Gould had turned down a reunion with Altman on McCabe & Mrs. Miller (1971). He had also turned down the lead in Sam Peckinpah's Straw Dogs (1971).

Gould's next efforts would turn mixed results, including his decision to buy the rights for Little Murders with an eye to producing and reprising his lead role in a film adaptation. Directed by Alan Arkin, and released in 1971, it was another commercial disappointment, but has since earned a cult following. Gould went to Sweden to play the lead role in Ingmar Bergman's English-language debut The Touch (1971). He was the first Hollywood star to appear in a Bergman film. The Touch received mixed reviews and was not one of Bergman's more successful films commercially.

Gould and his producing partner helped make Woody Allen's satirical slapstick comedy Everything You Always Wanted to Know About Sex* (*But Were Afraid to Ask) (1972), later selling it to United Artists. He was reportedly offered the lead role in Pocket Money (1972), but turned it down because he did not want to work with director Stuart Rosenberg again after his experience making Move. Gould continued developing projects in a behind-the-scenes capacity, including a failed adaptation of the novel A Glimpse of Tiger. Filming was abandoned after four days of shooting, following rumours that Gould was addicted to drugs, something the actor has strenuously denied.

In 1972, he was among the guests in David Winters' musical television special The Special London Bridge Special, starring Tom Jones, and Jennifer O'Neill.

Gould reemerged with one of his most iconic roles in 1973's The Long Goodbye, Robert Altman's adaptation of Raymond Chandler's novel. Gould starred as detective Philip Marlowe, a role which had previously been played by Humphrey Bogart and Dick Powell. By comparison, Gould's performance was more naturalistic, with the screenplay by Leigh Brackett (who had previously adapted The Big Sleep for Howard Hawks and Bogart) updating the setting to contemporary Los Angeles. Although not a major hit, the film was later regarded as one of Gould's best. Alan R. Howard of The Hollywood Reporter wrote "The eccentric casting of Elliott Gould is altogether successful and allows the filmmakers to embrace the detective genre affectionately, transforming it into a dreamlike excursion through modern Los Angeles."

The following year, Gould reunited with Robert Altman for the film, California Split (1974), an acclaimed gambling dramedy that co-starred George Segal. Additionally, Gould made a brief cameo appearance as himself in the Altman film Nashville (1975).

He soon made two more "buddy" movies: Busting (1974), a cop movie with Robert Blake, directed by Peter Hyams; and S*P*Y*S (1975), a spy spoof which reunited him with Sutherland. Neither was particularly popular. Returning to comedy, he played the lead in two films for Brut Productions, both comedies: Whiffs (1975) and then opposite Diane Keaton in I Will, I Will... for Now (1976). He and Keaton also starred in Harry and Walter Go to New York (1976) with James Caan and Michael Caine. All flopped at the box office. He joined the ensemble cast of Richard Attenborough's World War II drama film A Bridge Too Far (1977). Gould played Col. Robert Stout, a role based on Robert Sink. The ensemble cast included Robert Redford, James Caan, Michael Caine, Sean Connery, Anthony Hopkins, Gene Hackman, Liv Ullmann, and Laurence Olivier. The film was a financial and critical success.

The following year Gould returned to mainstream success with Capricorn One (1978), directed by Peter Hyams and starring James Brolin, Sam Waterston, and O. J. Simpson. The film was financed by producer Lew Grade, who later arranged Gould's guest appearances in The Muppets and its movie spin-offs. After making Capricorn One Gould was announced to direct A New Life from a novel by Bernard Malamud with Robert Altman producing but the film was not made. Gould went to Canada to star in the highly regarded thriller The Silent Partner (1978) starring Christopher Plummer before working again with Grade on Escape to Athena (1979). He starred in the much-maligned remake of The Lady Vanishes (1979). Also in 1979, Gould appeared as Cher's dance partner at the end of the music video for her Top 10 disco hit "Take Me Home".

During this period Gould hosted Saturday Night Live six times, his final time being the first episode of the disastrous Jean Doumanian season (season 6) in November 1980, where he was shocked to find that the original cast and producer Lorne Michaels were gone and had been replaced. Although he never hosted SNL again, he did appear in a season 16 (1990–1991) episode hosted by Tom Hanks where Hanks is welcomed into the Five-Timers club, a society for celebrities who have hosted the show five times. He returned in season 47 (2021–2022) in a similar skit welcoming John Mulaney into the club.

It has been argued "Gould possibly had the most fascinating filmography of any ‘70s stars."

=== 1980s ===
In 1980, Gould starred in the romantic comedy film Falling in Love Again (1980), alongside Susannah York. Gould also made two films for Disney, The Last Flight of Noah's Ark (1980) and The Devil and Max Devlin (1981). Gould chose to return to Broadway with The Guys in the Truck in 1983 but left the production after the first week of previews, replaced by Harris Laskawy. The play closed on opening night.

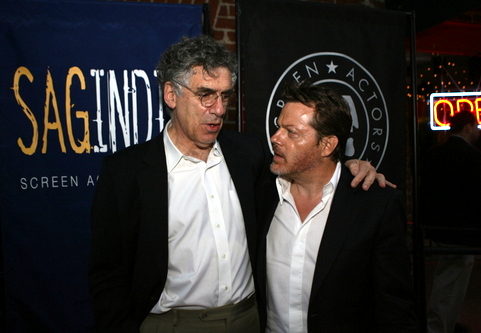
Elliott Gould and Eddie Izzard

Gould transitioned to television acting. From 1984 to 1985 Gould appeared on the CBS medical sitcom E/R playing the role of Dr. Howard Sheinfeld for 23 episodes. He appeared in 1986 The Twilight Zone episode: "The Misfortune Cookie". He also starred in the HBO television film Conspiracy: The Trial of the Chicago 8 (1987) playing criminal defense lawyer Leonard Weinglass. The film was directed and written by Jeremy Kagan and starred Carl Lumbly, Peter Boyle, Robert Loggia, Martin Sheen, and Billy Zane. He also continued acting in guest star roles on shows such as Murder, She Wrote. He continued to act in film, though his roles tended to be less impactful than those from preceding decades: he had leading roles in films such as Inside Out (1986) and Dangerous Love (1988) and he played a supporting role to Whoopi Goldberg in The Telephone (1988).

=== 1990s ===
Over time, Gould began to act more frequently in supporting roles. He received critical praise for his performance as an aging mobster in Warren Beatty's 1991 film Bugsy and once again performed a cameo as "himself" in Robert Altman's The Player (1992).

During the 1990s, Gould continued starring in guest roles in shows such as L.A. Law, Moon Over Miami, Lois & Clark: The New Adventures of Superman and Diagnosis: Murder. He co-starred with Michael McKean in Billy Crystal's 1991 six-part HBO comedy miniseries Sessions. He also became known to a new generation of viewers thanks to a recurring role as Jack Geller, the father of Courteney Cox's and David Schwimmer's characters Monica and Ross, on the NBC sitcom Friends, first appearing in 1994 and in twenty total episodes over the course of the show's run.

Around the same time he took a more dramatic role, as the boyfriend of the protagonist's mother, in the controversial drama American History X (1998) starring Edward Norton. While first reading the script, he believed the movie was a comedy similar to The Great Dictator, until he read the part where Norton's character curb stomps a black man.

=== 2000s ===
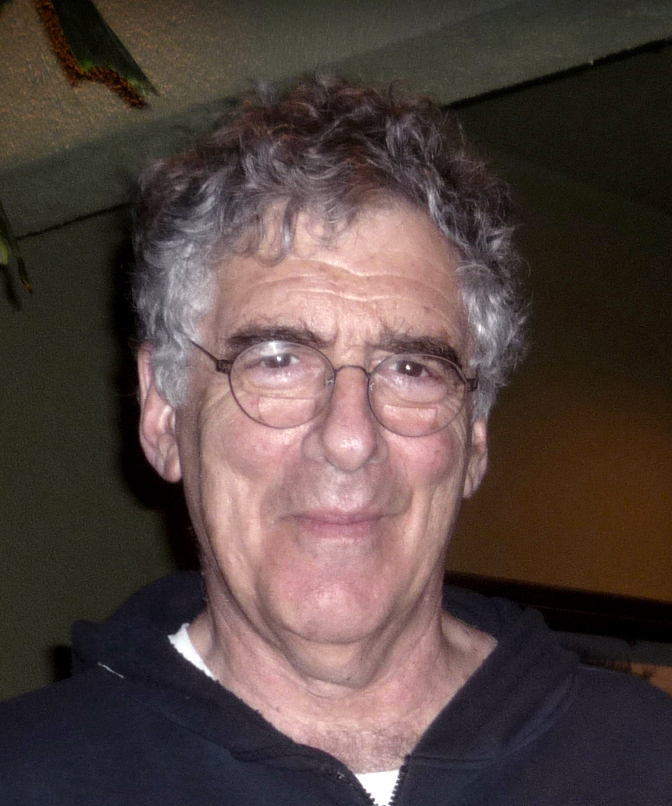
Gould at The 1 Second Film in June 2009

In 2001, Gould co-starred in Steven Soderbergh's heist film Ocean's Eleven, a 2001 remake of the classic Rat Pack caper film. The film starred George Clooney, Brad Pitt, Matt Damon, Julia Roberts, Andy García, Don Cheadle, Bernie Mac, and Carl Reiner. The film earned positive reviews and was an immense financial success. Gould played their wealthy friend, a former casino owner Reuben Tishkoff. He reprised the role for its sequels, Ocean's Twelve in 2004 and Ocean's Thirteen in 2007.

In 2005 he guest starred in a feature-length episode of the UK TV series Poirot, subsequently appearing in similar one-off or small roles in television series including Law & Order and CSI, and a more significant role in Showtime's Ray Donovan from 2013 to 2016. He has loaned his voice to several animated series, including the role of Mr. Stoppable, Ron Stoppable's dad in the Disney Channel Animated series Kim Possible (2003–2007). He also lent his voice for Hey Arnold!, The Simpsons and American Dad.

=== 2010s and 2020s ===
In 2011, Gould appeared in a supporting role in Soderbergh's ensemble thriller Contagion (2011) about virus outbreak leading to a worldwide pandemic. The cast included Matt Damon, Kate Winslet, Jude Law, Marion Cotillard, Laurence Fishburne, and Jennifer Ehle. The film received critical acclaim and was a box office success. The following year he appeared in Jonathan Dayton and Valerie Faris' romantic comedy-drama film Ruby Sparks (2012) starring Paul Dano, Zoe Kazan. More recently, he co-starred with Jemaine Clement in the human comedy Humor Me (2017). In 2018, Gould reprised his role of Reuben in Ocean's 8. He appeared in 2020's Dangerous Lies.

Gould appeared in guest starring roles in detective shows such as CSI: Crime Scene Investigation (2010) and Law & Order: Special Victims Unit (2012). He also appeared in a recurring role as Ezra Goldman in the Showtime crime series Ray Donovan (2013–2016) starring Liev Schreiber and Jon Voight. Gould also played John Mulaney's neighbor in the sitcom Mulaney (2014–2015). He also appeared in guest roles in Maron (2015), The Kominsky Method (2018), and Grace and Frankie (2020). He also briefly appeared in Friends: The Reunion along with Christina Pickles and the rest of the Friends cast. He played a recurring role as retired lawyer David "Legal" Siegel from the second season of The Lincoln Lawyer (2023)..

== Personal life ==
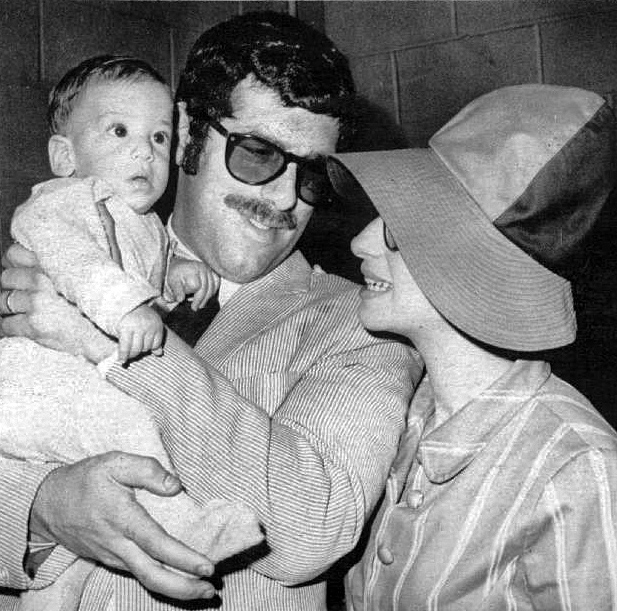
Gould and Barbra Streisand in 1967

=== Marriages ===
Gould has said that he has a "very deep Jewish identity". He has been married three times, twice to the same woman:

- Barbra Streisand (September 13, 1963 – July 6, 1971; divorced after a two-year separation; one child, actor Jason Gould)
- Jennifer Bogart (December 8, 1973 – October 5, 1975; June 9, 1978 – September 5, 1989), daughter of Paul Bogart. They were divorced twice. The couple had a daughter and a son before their marriage.

Gould serves on the SAG-AFTRA National Board of Directors. He is associated with the Save Ellis Island cause and narrated the documentary Forgotten Ellis Island.

In 2010, Gould said that he had intensified his study of Judaism and maintained close ties with Chabad.

== Awards and nominations ==
Year	Association	Category	Title	Result
1969	Academy Award	Best Supporting Actor	Bob & Carol & Ted & Alice	Nominated
1969	British Academy Film Award	Best Actor	Bob & Carol & Ted & Alice	Nominated
1969	New York Film Critics Circle	Best Supporting Actor	Bob & Carol & Ted & Alice	Nominated
1969	Laurel Awards	Male New Face	Bob & Carol & Ted & Alice	Nominated
1970	British Academy Film Award	Best Actor	M*A*S*H	Nominated
1970	Golden Globe Award	Best Actor – Motion Picture Musical or Comedy	M*A*S*H	Nominated
1970	Laurel Awards	Comedy Performance – Male	M*A*S*H	Won
1991	National Society of Film Critics	Best Supporting Actor	Bugsy	Nominated
