= Frank Michael (disambiguation) =

Frank Michael or Frank-Michael may refer to:

== Frank Michael ==
- Frank Michael, Belgian singer of Italian origin
- Frank Michael Beyer (1928–2008), German composer

== Frank-Michael ==
- Frank-Michael Wahl (born 1956), German handball player
- Frank-Michael Marczewski (born 1954), German football (soccer) player

== See also ==
- Michael Franks
