= John Cameron (musician) =

British composer, arranger, conductor and instrumentalist (born 1944)

- Born: 20 March 1944 (age 82); Woodford, Essex, England
- Occupations: Composer, arranger, conductor, record producer
- Years active: 1966–present

John Cameron (born 20 March 1944) is a British composer, arranger, conductor and musician. He is well known for his many film, TV and stage credits, and for his contributions to pop recordings, notably those by Donovan, Cilla Black and the group Hot Chocolate. Cameron's instrumental version of Led Zeppelin's "Whole Lotta Love", became a hit for his group CCS and, for many years, a version of Cameron's arrangement was used as the theme music for the BBC TV show Top of the Pops.

== Biography ==
Cameron was born in Woodford, Essex, England. By the age of 12, he had started performing in talent shows, and at 14 played jazz piano in pubs in Croydon. He was educated at Wallington County Grammar School and at Corpus Christi College, Cambridge, where he was a contemporary of Daryl Runswick. Aside from performing on the local jazz scene, Cameron also became Vice-President of the Cambridge Footlights comedy club, where he collaborated on lyrics and performed with Eric Idle.

After leaving Cambridge, he played in jazz groups, often performing satirical material, and recorded an album, Cover Lover, in 1966. He also began working as an arranger for pop and rock artists, including Alex Harvey, before being introduced to folk-pop artist Donovan. His credits include Donovan's number 1 U.S. hit "Sunshine Superman" (co-arranged with Spike Heatley). Cameron eventually became Donovan's music director, but there was an unexpected hiatus of several months following the recording of the Sunshine Superman album. Donovan's British label, Pye Records, who had a US licensing deal with Warner Bros. Records, filed a lawsuit when they found out that Donovan had signed an American recording deal with rival label Epic Records. The legal proceedings held up the UK release of the album, and prevented Donovan from touring or recording for several months in early 1966. In the interim Cameron was obliged to go back to conducting pantomime at his local Watford Palace Theatre.

From mid-1966, with the lawsuit resolved, Cameron began touring and recording regularly with Donovan, and he arranged and played on many of his hit singles "Jennifer Juniper" and "Epistle to Dippy", the albums Sunshine Superman and Mellow Yellow, as well as Donovan's music for the 1967 Ken Loach film, Poor Cow.

Cameron also began working in television; one of his first major credits in this area was as music director and arranger for three seasons of the TV variety series Once More with Felix with folk-singer Julie Felix (1967–69), The Bobbie Gentry Show and numerous episodes of Stanley Dorfman's In Concert series for the BBC, which featured artists including James Taylor, Joni Mitchell and Randy Newman.

Cameron also scored two British hits as a songwriter with "If I Thought You'd Ever Change Your Mind", a number 20 UK hit for Cilla Black (which was also a number 11 UK hit for Agnetha Fältskog in 2004) and "Sweet Inspiration", a Top 10 single for Johnny Johnson and the Bandwagon.

Cameron's first venture in film composition was for director Ken Loach, who asked him to compose the score for Kes (1969). This led to further commissions, including The Ruling Class (1972) with Peter O'Toole, Night Watch (1973) with Elizabeth Taylor, and A Touch of Class (1973) with Glenda Jackson and George Segal, for which Cameron was nominated for an Academy Award. His other film scores included The Rise and Rise of Michael Rimmer (1970) and the cult horror film Psychomania (1973), among many others. He also collaborated with Keith Mansfield on albums of library music.

In the early 1970s, Cameron formed CCS, a jazz-rock big band that included Cameron, Mickie Most, Alexis Korner and Herbie Flowers; they scored four UK hits—a mainly instrumental version of Led Zeppelin's "Whole Lotta Love" (UK number 13), a version of which was also used as the theme music for Top of the Pops from 1970 to 1981; the Donovan songs "Walkin'" (UK number 7); and "Tap Turns on the Water" (UK number 5) and "Brother" (UK number 25), both written by Cameron and Korner.

Cameron had further success as pop arranger with UK soul-funk band Hot Chocolate, working on all their hit singles including "Emma", "Heaven Is in the Back Seat of My Cadillac", "You Sexy Thing" and "Every 1's a Winner". Similarly, he worked as arranger with Heatwave on three albums, including the singles "Boogie Nights", "Always and Forever", "The Groove Line" and "Gangsters of the Groove". He is also credited for the score on the 1974 UK hit single "Central Park Arrest" by vocal trio Thunderthighs, working alongside Steve Rowland and songwriter Lynsey de Paul.

In the late 1970s, Cameron was approached by Alain Boublil and Claude-Michel Schönberg to arrange and conduct a concept album based on Victor Hugo's Les Misérables. Initially staged in Paris, France, by Robert Hossein, it was then produced in the UK by Cameron Mackintosh and the Royal Shakespeare Company, directed by Trevor Nunn and John Caird. Les Misérables became one of the most successful musicals of all time, winning Cameron the Drama Desk Award for Outstanding Orchestrations and a National Broadway Theatre Award. He also orchestrated the 1991 London Palladium revival of Joseph and the Amazing Technicolor Dreamcoat, Honk! and Spend Spend Spend.

Cameron's numerous TV credits include The Protectors television series, the Emmy Award-winning TV miniseries Jack the Ripper (starring Michael Caine), Disney's Little House on the Prairie, To End All Wars and The Path to 9/11, for which Cameron was nominated for an Emmy Award.

Cameron has also worked with artists such as José Carreras and the Choir of New College Oxford and Swedish baritone Carry Persson. He produced and arranged Lux Aeterna, a choral setting of Elgar’s Nimrod, and conducted his own composition, Missa Celtica, recorded with the English Chamber Orchestra and the Choir of New College Oxford.

The song "Paper Habits" by Jet Life (Currensy's rap group), sampled Cameron's "Liquid Sunshine", and is from the group's collaboration album Jet World Order (2011).

== Filmography ==
- Kes (1969)
- Every Home Should Have One (1970)
- The Rise and Rise of Michael Rimmer (1970)
- The Strange Vengeance of Rosalie (1972)
- Made (1972)
- The Ruling Class (1972)
- Night Watch (1973)
- A Touch of Class (1973)
- Psychomania (1973)
- Charley One-Eye (1973)
- Scalawag (1973)
- Moments (1974)
- Who? (1974)
- Out of Season (1975)
- Whiffs (1975)
- I Will, I Will... for Now (1976)
- Guardian of the Wilderness (1976)
- Pure as a Lily (1976)
- The Great Scout & Cathouse Thursday (1976)
- Nasty Habits (1977)
- Spectre (1977)
- The Thief of Baghdad (1978)
- Lost and Found (1979)
- The London Connection (1979)
- Sunburn (1979)
- The Mirror Crack'd (1980)
- Jimmy the Kid (1982)
- Witness for the Prosecution (1982)
- The Jigsaw Man (1984)
- The Secret Garden (1987)
- Mister Corbett's Ghost (1987)
- Jack the Ripper (1988)
- Frankenstein (1992)
- To End All Wars (2001)
- After... (2006)

== Selected discography ==
- Jazzrock, KPM 1097 (1972)
- Afro Rock, KPM 1130 (1973) (with Alan Parker)
- Voices in Harmony, KPM 1125 (1973) (with Keith Mansfield)
- The Protectors (CD, Networkonair. Original incidental music from the 1972-3 series, released in 2009)
- Folk, Funk and Beyond: the arrangements of John Cameron. Ace Records CDTOP 1631 (2023)
