= Brut (cologne) =

Men's grooming products by Fabergé

- Product type: Men's grooming products
- Current owner: Unilever; Sodalis USA (formerly High Ridge Brands) (United States, Canada, Mexico, Puerto Rico and Latin America); Pharmacare Laboratories (Australia, New Zealand and the Pacific Islands)
- Introduced: 1964; 62 years ago
- Markets: Worldwide
- Previous owners: Fabergé, Inc. (1964-1989); Helen of Troy Limited (2003-2021)

Brut (French pronunciation: [bʁyt]) is a brand name for a line of men's grooming and fragrance products marketed around the world by Unilever – except in the United States, Canada, Mexico, Puerto Rico and Latin America, where it is owned by Sodalis USA (formerly High Ridge Brands Company); and in Australia, New Zealand and the Pacific Islands, where it is owned by Pharmacare Laboratories.

== History ==
Brut was launched in 1964 by the American firm Fabergé Inc. and has been owned since 1990 by the British multinational company Unilever.

In 2003, Unilever divested the rights to the brand in several countries – in the United States, Canada, Mexico, Puerto Rico and Latin America, the rights were acquired by Helen of Troy Limited – for Australia, New Zealand and the Pacific Islands, the rights were acquired by Pharmacare Laboratories. In June 2021, High Ridge Brands (HRB) acquired Brut and several personal care brands from Helen of Troy Limited. HRB was acquired by Italian company Sodalis Group in October 2024.

== Products ==
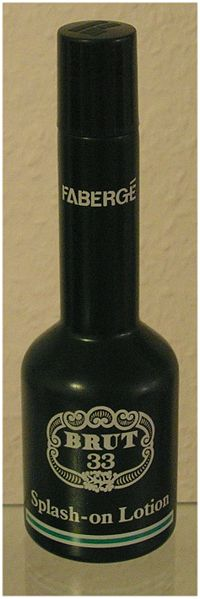
Brut 33 by Fabergé

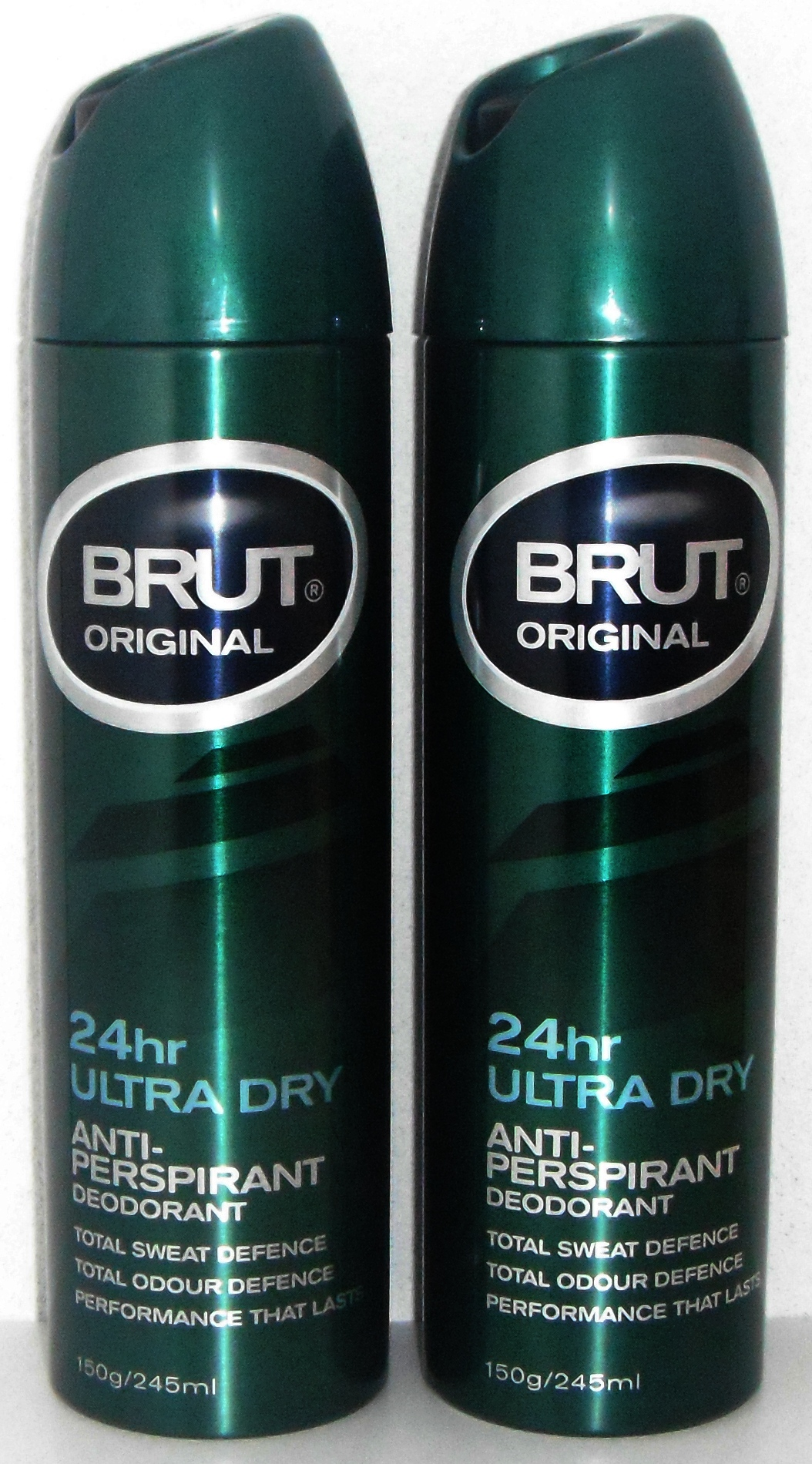
Brut Original anti-perspirant spray by Unilever

The Brut line grew to include aftershave, balms and deodorant. Packaged in a green glass bottle with a silver-coloured medallion, it is still sold as of 2025.

In 1968, a budget range was marketed as Brut 33, because it contained 33% of the fragrance of the original product. Packaged in cheaper plastic bottles, it was described by the company as a "lighter fragrance."

Fabergé was taken over by Unilever in 1990 and was transferred to the Chesebrough-Ponds division in 1990. There, the Brut 33 range took over the name Brut. The Fabergé version became "Brut Classic by Fabergé" and retained its distinctive packaging.

Apart from some regions, Unilever sells Brut around the world, with major markets in the United Kingdom, France and the Far East. Australia produces its own Brut aftershave, which is purported to have a slightly different scent. In Brazil, there is a Brut-branded lather shaving cream in a tube, with the classic Brut fragrance.

== Celebrity endorsements ==
The star of the 1970s and early 1980s United Kingdom advertising campaign was boxer Henry Cooper, who used the slogan "splash it all over". Motorcycling world champion Barry Sheene, athlete David Hemery, showjumper Harvey Smith and footballer Kevin Keegan, also appeared in the campaigns. In Germany, the brand was endorsed in the 1970s by football player, Franz Beckenbauer.

In 1973, Allan Moffat drove a Brut 33 sponsored Ford Mustang in the Australian Touring Car Championship, followed by a Brut 33 sponsored XB Ford Falcon GT in 1974.

== Popular culture ==
Elvis Presley used Brut. In 2015, Jim Harbaugh was quoted as saying, "I've been a Brut man since I was 10 years old."
