= Cry for Me, Billy =

1972 film by William A. Graham

- Theatrical release poster
- Directed by: William A. Graham
- Written by: David Markson
- Produced by: Harvey Matofsky
- Starring: Cliff Potts; Xochitl; Harry Dean Stanton
- Cinematography: Jordan Cronenweth
- Edited by: Jim Benson
- Music by: Richard Markowitz
- Production company: Brut Productions
- Distributed by: Warner Bros.
- Release date: August 1972
- Running time: 93 minutes
- Country: United States
- Language: English
- Budget: $500,000

Cry for Me, Billy (also known as Count Your Bullets) is a 1972 American Western film directed by William A. Graham and starring Cliff Potts and Xochitl. It was one of the first films from Brut Productions. It was known as Face to the Wind.

== Plot ==
Hardened gunslinger Billy Williams is tired of violence and bloodshed. After encountering and giving water to a group of Apache prisoners under the care of a racist US Army sergeant and his men, Billy speaks with his friend Luke Todd about a possible job position far from there. When out, he discovers that all the Indians were murdered save for Flower, a girl taken as sex slave for the soldiers.

Billy follows the soldiers, intending to save Flower, finding that she escaped on her own. After earning her trust, both Billy and Flower travel together. They come across a cabin where Billy avoids an ambush by the owner Henry and his son Amos, keeping them both at hand with his shotgun. Decided to take some goods from the cabin, Henry offer to sell what he wants for money or in exchange for sex with Flower, to which he reacts angrily, forcing them to run.

Billy and Flower keep their march together in the wilderness using only Billy's horse, until they found a wild horse that Billy domesticates. They fall in love soon after and make love. Then they are found by the sergeant and his men who were alerted of their whereabouts by Henry and Amos. They beat up Billy and tie him to a trunk, kill the wild horse, gang-rape Flower and steal the remaining horse. After the men leave, Flower releases Billy from his bindings but when he separates from her for a few moments, she kills herself. Heartbroken, Billy buries Flower and searches for vengeance.

Billy follows the soldiers, ambushing them in the middle of the night and killing them. After that he returns to the town, willing to take the job Luke offered him in order to leave forever the gunslinger life. While leaving the place, he is shot by the town blacksmith, whose hand he had shot earlier.

== Cast ==
- Cliff Potts as Billy Williams
- Xochitl as Flower
- Harry Dean Stanton as Luke Todd
- Don Wilbanks as Sergeant
- Woody Chambliss as Prospector
- James Gammon as Amos
- William Carstens as Henry
- Roy Jensen as Blacksmith

== See also ==
- List of American films of 1972
