= Timotei =

Shampoo brand owned by Unilever

- Timotei shampoo and conditioner
- Product type: Shampoo
- Current owner: Unilever
- Country: Finland
- Tagline: "So mild you can wash your hair as often as you like"
- Website: timoteicodaa.com

Timotei is a shampoo brand owned by Unilever. The name Timotei comes from the Finnish word for a wild grass called timothy (timotei in Finnish). The Timotei brand was conceived and designed by Lintas Helsinki in Finland. Timotei shampoo was launched in the early 1980s, but some countries only sold Timotei for a short period. The tagline was 'So mild you can wash your hair as often as you like'.

== Media ==
The early 1990s rock band Nelson were derisively nicknamed "the Timotei twins" by the British magazine Kerrang! for their waist-length blond hair.

In the episode "Parade" of the 1990s BBC comedy TV series Bottom, Richie (Rik Mayall) attempts to chat up a barmaid (Julia Sawalha) by asking her if she uses Timotei.

Timotei was featured in the Japanese anime Lucky Star, episode 6. The character Konata Izumi makes a dated reference to a Japanese Timotei commercial, is disappointed when her friends don't get it, but is then vindicated when her adult cousin Yui gets it.

In episode 6 of the BBC series Dead Boss, the main character Helen refers to being violated with a Timotei bottle while in prison.
