= Sweet Hostage =

- Film poster
- Genre: Drama; Romance
- Written by: Edward Hume; Nathaniel Benchley; Antonio Calderón; William Douglas Lansford
- Directed by: Lee Philips
- Starring: Linda Blair; Martin Sheen; Jeanne Cooper
- Theme music composer: Luchi De Jesus
- Country of origin: United States
- Original language: English

Production
- Executive producer: George Barrie
- Producers: Sidney Balkin; Richard Lyons
- Production location: Taos, New Mexico
- Cinematography: Richard Glouner
- Editor: George Jay Nicholson
- Running time: 95 minutes
- Production company: Brut Productions

Original release
- Network: ABC
- Release: October 10, 1975

Sweet Hostage is a 1975 American made-for-television drama film based on the novel Welcome to Xanadu by Nathaniel Benchley. The film stars Linda Blair and Martin Sheen. It was filmed in Taos County, New Mexico. It was featured in ABC's Friday Night Movie series. Film and television critic Leonard Maltin rated the movie as "Average" in his biennial ratings guide TV Movies. In his capsule review, Maltin said "the performances by Sheen and Blair almost made this talky adaptation of the Nathaniel Benchley novel worthwhile". The film was only a moderate success in the Nielsen ratings, and failed to generate the type of provocative press which was then-standard for a Linda Blair movie.

== Synopsis ==
A disillusioned impoverished high school dropout, Doris Mae is forced to do most of the grunt work on her family’s dirt farm. While returning from errands, her truck breaks down, and she hitches a ride with an escaped mental patient who decides to take her with him to his cabin hideout when she talks about how miserable her life is.

Known to her only as Kubla Kahn and rechristened Cristabell by her captor, Doris Mae is alternately regaled by his poetry, regal manners, and imagination – and subjected to his violent mood swings, mostly triggered by her sassiness and escape attempts. We are given to understand that Leonard’s issues stem from smother mothering so extreme that it left him friendless and impotent, although he was once married.

Leonard and Doris Mae rapidly fall in love. It doesn’t take much to see that their kindness towards each other is likely the first kindness either one of them has ever experienced from another human being. Both are overwhelmed and changed by the experience, but Leonard’s change is especially stark. His impotence behind him, the two of them make love at a moment when they should have fled instead. After the afterglow, the cabin is surrounded. Seeing no way out, Leonard sees Doris Mae safe inside the fireplace and shoots himself rather than be recaptured.

== Cast ==
- Linda Blair as Doris Mae Withers
- Martin Sheen as Leonard Hatch
- Jeanne Cooper as Mrs. Withers
- Lee de Broux as Sheriff Emmet
- Bert Remsen as Mr. Withers
- Dehl Berti as Harry Fox
- Al Hopson as Mr. Smathers
- William Sterchi as Hank Smathers
- Roberto Valentino De Leon as Juan
- Michael Eiland as Tom Martinez
- Mary Michael Carnes as dry goods clerk
- Don Hann as liquor store proprietor
- Ross Elder as hospital attendant
- Chris Williams as man in bungalow

== DVD ==
Sweet Hostage was released to DVD by Warner Home Video on November 2, 2011, as a Region 1 MOD DVD made available through Warner Archive Collection.

== See also ==
- Stockholm syndrome
