= S*P*Y*S =

1974 film by Irvin Kershner

- Theatrical release poster
- Directed by: Irvin Kershner
- Written by: Malcolm Marmorstein; Lawrence J. Cohen; Fred Freeman
- Produced by: Robert Chartoff; Irwin Winkler
- Starring: Elliott Gould; Donald Sutherland
- Cinematography: Gerry Fisher
- Edited by: Robert Lawrence; Keith Palmer
- Music by: Jerry Goldsmith
- Production companies: American Film Properties; Dymphana
- Distributed by: 20th Century Fox
- Release date: June 28, 1974
- Running time: 100 minutes
- Country: United States
- Language: English
- Box office: $4 million (US/Canada)

S*P*Y*S is a 1974 American spy comedy film directed by Irvin Kershner, and starring Elliott Gould, Donald Sutherland and Zouzou. It was screened at the 1974 Cannes Film Festival, but it was not entered into the main competition.

The film is set in Paris. It depicts a deal between high-ranking operatives of the KGB and CIA. Two American agents are going to be killed, in answer to the recent deaths of two Russian agents. The two intended victims find out about the deal and flee. They seek refuge with French anarchists.

== Plot ==
Following an accident where two KGB agents are mistakenly killed during a failed attempt to help a Russian athlete's defection to the West, the head of the CIA in Paris stipulates an agreement with his Russian counterpart to have two American agents killed in order to avoid retaliation.

The choice falls on Bruland, an uptight agent passionate about his job and on the promotion ladder, and Griff, a somehow cynical and disillusioned courier. When the two men discover the plot, they form an uneasy alliance to try to escape, eventually getting involved with a French anarchist group and an independent French agent.

== Cast ==
- Elliott Gould as Griff
- Donald Sutherland as Bruland
- Zouzou as Sybil (credited as Zou Zou)
- Joss Ackland as Martinson
- Xavier Gélin as Paul, Revolutionary
- Vladek Sheybal as Borisenko, Russian Spy Chief
- Michael Petrovitch as Sevitsky, Defector
- Shane Rimmer as Hessler
- Kenneth Griffith as Lippet
- Pierre Oudrey as Revolutionary (credited as Pierre Oudry)
- Kenneth J. Warren as Grubov
- Jacques Marin as Lafayette
- Jeffrey Wickham as Seely
- Nigel Hawthorne as Croft
- John Bardon as Evans

== Production ==
The film was originally called Wet Stuff, after spy slang for blood. It was announced in March 1973 by Nat Cohen as part of a slate of films worth £5 million.

Filming took place in Paris and England. "Donald and I are very funny together," said Gould. "We're sort of Laurel and Hardy gone straight. Or half straight. And Kershner is very serious. It makes a good balance."

The asterisks in the title are designed to remind viewers of MASH, which also starred Gould and Sutherland, and whose title is generally rendered with the same asterisks. Beyond this, there is no connection between the films.

John Scott originally wrote the music score but this was replaced by one from Jerry Goldsmith. Scott said he "wrote a contemporary sounding, rhythm-oriented, caper-type score using a small orchestra. The Americans wanted something else."

== Reception ==
Nora Sayre of The New York Times wrote, "The only mystery contained in 'S*P*Y*S'—a feeble attempt to spoof the Central Intelligence Agency is why Donald Sutherland and Elliott Gould ever chose to be in it." Arthur D. Murphy of Variety called the film "a mess ... The script is tasteless, Irvin Kershner's direction is futile, and the whole effort comes across as vulgar, offensive and tawdry." Gene Siskel of the Chicago Tribune gave the film one-and-a-half stars out of four and criticized it for "creaky old jokes," writing that Kershner "plays for laughs as if the world has stood still for 20 years. The film's visual style has the look of a Hope and Crosby 'Road' picture, whereas the pacing and personalities of Sutherland and Gould are strictly contemporary." Charles Champlin of the Los Angeles Times called it "a trivial spy caper comedy ... not without its amusing touches but with almost nothing on its mind." Gary Arnold of The Washington Post wrote, "The material is not in the least fresh. The script sounds as if it had been sitting around gathering dust for several years, and whoever dusted it off failed to inject much in the way of new jokes or verbal wit. However, director Irvin Kershner brings so much energy and professionalism to this essentially tired assignment that it plays with considerable verve."

The film grossed $1,148,674 in its opening weekend from 79 theaters.

== Novelization ==
Shortly before the release of the film, as customary in the era, Pocket Books published a novelization of the screenplay, as by T. Robert Joyce. The by-line seems to exist nowhere else and may be a pseudonym.

== See also ==
- List of American films of 1974
