= Welcome to Arrow Beach =

1974 American horror film directed by Laurence Harvey

- Theatrical release poster
- Directed by: Laurence Harvey
- Written by: Laurence Harvey; Jack Gross, Jr.
- Based on: story by Wallace Bennett
- Produced by: Laurence Harvey; Jack Cushingham
- Starring: Laurence Harvey; Joanna Pettet; Meg Foster; Stuart Whitman; John Ireland
- Cinematography: Gerald Perry Finnerman
- Music by: Tony Camillo
- Production company: Brut Productions
- Distributed by: Warner Bros.
- Release date: May 1974
- Running time: 85 minutes
- Country: United States
- Language: English

Welcome to Arrow Beach is a 1974 American horror film directed by and starring Laurence Harvey. Following its limited theatrical release, an edited version of the film was reissued in 1976 under the title Tender Flesh. This was Harvey's final film.

== Plot ==
Robbin Stanley, a young hitchhiker, left stranded after a car crash and wandering on a California beach, is taken in by Jason Henry, a photographer and Korean War veteran, who lives in a nearby beach front house with his sister Grace. After Jason confides that Grace has some mental problems, Robbin soon begins to suspect that the opposite applies and that the mansion is home to some very strange goings-on.

== Cast ==
- Laurence Harvey as Jason Henry
- Joanna Pettet as Grace Henry
- Stuart Whitman as Deputy Rakes
- John Ireland as Sheriff Duke Bingham
- Meg Foster as Robbin Stanley
- Gloria LeRoy as Ginger
- David Macklin as Alex Heath
- Dodie Heath as Felice
- Altovise Davis as Deputy Molly
- Elizabeth St. Clair as Head Nurse
- Robert Lussier as Deputy Lippencourt
- Jesse Vint as Hot Rod Driver
- Tony Ballen as Pharmacist
- John Hart as Doctor
- Andy Romano as Bryant
- Florence Lake as Landlady

== Production ==
Filming began in February 1973. Harvey was very ill during the shoot from cancer. Harvey died in late 1973 before the film's release. Lou Rawls sings the opening song "Who Can Tell Us Why".

The full-length running time of the film is 99 minutes.

== Reception ==
The film took a year to be released. The Los Angeles Times called the film "a dreary, tedious tale".

Harvey said the film was "vaguely reminiscent of Suddenly Last Summer... it could be labeled a contemporary parable about innocence in a very sick world". He later called the film a thriller "which makes no comment on anything."
