= Brut Productions =

American film production company (1972-1981)

Brut Productions was a film production company that was an offshoot of Fabergé cosmetics under George Barrie.

== History ==
Barrie began considering becoming involved in film production when producer Mike Frankovich asked Fabergé to create a mock advertisement for a scene in his film of The Love Machine (1971). Barrie made an advertisement for a perfume, Xanadu. Sales of the perfume shot up as a result of its appearance in the film.

Brut Productions was launched in March 1972. Cary Grant was on the board of directors and Roger Moore was an ambassador at large. Barrie said in July 1972 "We're not in business just for Cary or Roger to make the films they want."

"It's a diversification of Fabergé and is strictly commercial", said Moore.

Brut initially announced they would make five feature films and four TV productions. The features were Hugo the Hippo, then being filmed; Night Watch with Elizabeth Taylor and Laurence Harvey; A Touch of Class with Glenda Jackson; The Book of Numbers; and Getting Rid of Mr Straker with Roger Moore.

The four TV productions were The Protectors with Robert Vaughn and Nyree Dawn Porter; Anita in Jumbo Land with Anita Harris; Rexford with Glenn Stanley; and The Whistling Wizard, a Bil Baird puppet show. (Brut did not finance the TV productions, they distributed them in America.)

The company decided to move into film distribution as well.

=== First films ===
In October 1972, the company announced they were moving to Los Angeles and that Martin Rackin was appointed senior vice president. The first three films they financed were Nightwatch, A Touch of Class and Book of Numbers. They were working on an animated musical in Hungary, Hugo the Hippo and paid $500,000 to distribute Count Your Bullets. Barrie wanted to move into television production and music, including their own music label. Avco Embassy agreed to distribute the features .

Production of Getting Rid of Mr Straker was postponed after Roger Moore was cast as James Bond. The company financed Miracles Still Happen and Welcome to Arrow Beach.

The company had a big early success with A Touch of Class (1973).

In October 1973, songwriter Sammy Cahn joined as a creative consultant. In December of 1973, Ross Hunter was appointed president. He signed a distribution agreement with Warner Bros.

=== Struggles ===
However, Hunter left a few months later in April of 1974. George Barrie moved into producing with Whiffs.

Later films performed less well at the box office. Brut suffered losses from 1975 onwards.

They made two TV movies, Sweet Hostage and Black Market Baby.

=== Final years and current ownership status ===
Fabergé reported in 1981 the company lost $5.4 million. Fabergé sold their interest in 17 films in 1982 for an undisclosed amount to the Turner Broadcasting System.

Brut Productions entire library is currently owned by Warner Bros. through Turner Entertainment Co.

== Select films ==
- Cry for Me, Billy (1972) aka Count Your Bullets
- Night Watch (1973)
- A Touch of Class (1973)
- Book of Numbers (1973)
- Welcome to Arrow Beach (1973)
- Miracles Still Happen (1974) aka The Story of Juliane Koepcke
- Hangup (1974)
- Mean Johnny Barrows (1974)
- Whiffs (1975)
- Sweet Hostage (1975)
- Hedda (1975)
- Hugo the Hippo (1975)
- I Will, I Will... for Now (1976)
- Nasty Habits (1977)
- Thieves (1977)
- Fingers (1978)
- Black Market Baby (1977)
- The Class of Miss MacMichael (1978)
- The Dream Merchants (1980) (TV)

=== Unmade projects ===
- Getting Rid of Mr Straker with Roger Moore, Lee Remick and Orson Welles
- The Poison Crown based on Marlowe's Edward II starring Sarah Miles for producer Martin Poll and director Hicocx
- Marble Arch
- The Department Store
- Vicki biopic of Victoria Woodhull written by James Toback
