= Michael Franks =

Michael or Mike Franks may refer to:

- Michael Franks (musician) (born 1944), American jazz singer and songwriter
  - Michael Franks (album), his eponymous album released in 1973
- Michael Franks (athlete) (born 1963), American sprinter
- Mike Franks (soccer) (born 1977), Canada soccer goalkeeper
- Mike Franks (tennis) (born 1936), American tennis player
- Mike Franks (NCIS), a fictional character from American television series NCIS
