= A Touch of Class (film) =

1973 film by Melvin Frank

- Original movie poster
- Directed by: Melvin Frank
- Screenplay by: Melvin Frank; Jack Rose
- Based on: She Loves Me, She Told Me So Last Night by Melvin Frank
- Produced by: Melvin Frank
- Starring: George Segal; Glenda Jackson; Paul Sorvino; Hildegard Neil
- Cinematography: Austin Dempster
- Edited by: Bill Butler
- Music by: John Cameron
- Production company: Brut Productions
- Distributed by: AVCO Embassy Pictures
- Release date: 20 June 1973
- Running time: 106 minutes
- Country: United Kingdom
- Budget: $1 million
- Box office: $16.8 million

A Touch of Class is a 1973 British romantic comedy film produced and directed by Melvin Frank and starring George Segal, Glenda Jackson, Hildegard Neil, Paul Sorvino and K Callan. The film tells the story of a couple (Segal and Jackson) having an affair, who find themselves falling in love. It was nominated for five Academy Awards, including Best Picture, with Jackson winning Best Actress.

The film was adapted by Melvin Frank and Jack Rose from Frank's story "She Loves Me, She Told Me So Last Night" (which also became the name of an original song briefly sung in the film by Segal and Jackson). However, it bears more than a passing resemblance to an earlier Frank film, The Facts of Life (1960), which likewise dealt with a middle-aged couple trying to have an affair, centering on a disaster-laden trip to a place where they would not be recognized.

The lead role of Steve was originally offered to Cary Grant, with a promise by Frank to rewrite the script to play up the age difference between Steve and Vickie. However, Grant opted to remain in retirement from filmmaking, and he turned the role down. Despite this, he did remain connected to the film, as it was produced by Fabergé's Brut Productions, and Grant was on the board of directors for Fabergé. Roger Moore was also offered the lead role before dropping out to star in Live and Let Die, his first appearance as James Bond. Moore did, however, have a hand in the production of this film.

Glenda Jackson revealed that she was approached by the director Melvin Frank after appearing on the comedy sketch and variety program The Morecambe & Wise Show on the BBC in the United Kingdom in 1971, in the "Antony and Cleopatra" sketch. After her role in this film won her an Oscar, Eric Morecambe sent her a telegram reading, "Stick with us and we will get you another one".

== Plot ==
Vickie Allessio, a divorced British mother of two, meets Steve Blackburn, an American married man, while sharing a taxi in London. Steve is attracted to Vickie and invites her to tea, then lunch, and eventually suggests they have sex. Vickie agrees but expresses her desire to have uncomplicated sex in a sunny location. Steve arranges a trip to Málaga, Spain.

Their plans are disrupted when Steve's wife, Gloria, unexpectedly shows up. To hide their affair, Steve pretends that Vickie is his mother. He cancels the plane tickets he had arranged for his family and encounters his friend Walter Menkes, a movie producer, at the airport. Steve, unable to admit that he is with Vickie, spends the flight next to Walter while Vickie sits elsewhere.

Upon arriving in Málaga, Steve gives the last decent rental car to Walter to get rid of him. He ends up driving an Italian car with an awkward clutch, causing discomfort and annoyance to Vickie. They struggle up several flights of stairs to reach their hotel room.

Their first night together becomes awkward as they argue about their preferences during sex. Steve injures his back, requiring medical attention and sleep. In the morning, Vickie encounters an American woman named Patty but declines her invitation to dinner. Steve wakes up to find Vickie sunbathing on the balcony and they finally have sex.

Steve becomes disappointed when Vickie does not show enthusiasm afterward, leading to anger and tension between them. During a golf game, Vickie takes offense at Steve's competitive nature against a local boy. The tension continues to mount, and Vickie decides to have dinner with Patty while Steve arranges dinner with Walter. To their surprise, Vickie discovers that Patty is Walter's wife, leading to an uncomfortable dinner for the four of them.

After an argument in their hotel room, Steve and Vickie decide to return to London. At the airport, they realize that the last two plane tickets have been sold. Frustrated, they return to the hotel room and start attacking each other playfully. The situation turns humorous, and their relationship begins to blossom.

Walter and Patty notice the developing relationship between Steve and Vickie. Walter shares his own experience of a holiday romance and warns Steve that it won't work out. Despite this, Steve expresses his desire to continue seeing Vickie when they return to London. They rent a secret flat together, concealing their affair.

As their relationship progresses, it becomes more complicated. Vickie puts in a lot of effort to be with Steve, but he often disappoints her. Steve rushes off after sex without realizing that Vickie has prepared a lavish meal for him. Vickie tries to seek companionship with her gay coworker, but he is unavailable. Steve feels guilty and brings flowers to Vickie, only to leave without saying a word.

The tension between them grows, and Steve's coworkers become aware of something going on. Steve tries to meet Vickie in the evening but forgets that he has plans with his wife. When his wife calls, Steve is unable to reach Vickie, and Vickie sees Steve and Gloria together at the theater. She feels betrayed and confronts Steve when he finally arrives at their flat.

The next morning, Steve sends a telegram to end their relationship but changes his mind and rushes to the flat; but Vickie has already received the telegram and begins packing to leave. As Steve arrives, he sees Vickie standing at a bus stop. Despite his efforts to get her attention, Vickie leaves in a taxi that another man had hailed. She asks the man if he is married, and upon his affirmative response, she walks away, leaving the taxi for him.

The story concludes with Vickie moving on from the failed affair and finding a new direction in her life.

== Cast ==
- George Segal as Steve Blackburn
- Glenda Jackson as Vickie Allessio
- Paul Sorvino as Walter Menkes
- K Callan as Patty Menkes
- Cec Linder as Wendell Thompson
- Nadim Sawalha as the night hotel manager
- David de Keyser as Doctor Alvarez
- Michael Elwyn as Cecil
- Mary Barclay as Martha Thompson
- Eve Karpf as Miss Ramos
- Hildegarde Neil as Gloria Blackburn
- Lisa Vanderpump as Julia Allessio (uncredited)

== Release ==
The film had its world premiere in London in May 1973, and opened in Los Angeles on June 27, 1973. The film earned $4,125,600 in North American rentals in 1973. Other accounts put rentals at $8.4 million.

== Reception ==
=== Critical response ===
Roger Ebert gave the film three stars out of four, calling it "a sharp-edged, often very funny dissection of a love affair between two possibly incompatible people. But then it gets serious with itself and ends on a note that doesn't satisfy us." Gene Siskel had a similar opinion, awarding two-and-a-half stars out of four and writing that in the film's best moments it "reminds one of those wonderful screen battles between Spencer Tracy and Katharine Hepburn," but then it "tries to get serious" which "leads to an unsatisfying conclusion totally removed from the dominant tone of the movie, which is raucous at best, contrived silliness at worst." Vincent Canby of The New York Times called it "a very patchy movie—enormously funny in bits and pieces and sometimes downright dumb." Variety wrote: "George Segal herein justifies superbly a reputation for comedy ability while Glenda Jackson's full-spectrum talent is again confirmed." Penelope Gilliatt of The New Yorker wrote that the film had "moments of reckless funniness" but observed that the "muddle of period convention is odd," as it blended the "Hepburn-Tracy tradition" and an "old-style slapstick" scene with "modern and naturalistic eroticism." Sylvia Millar of The Monthly Film Bulletin called the film "a waste of two considerable talents," stating that "Frank has written a script which is not devoid of wit; but it's never effortless, and a battering of coarse sexual polemic is always thrusting in to spoil the fun."

The film has a score of 86% on Rotten Tomatoes based on 14 reviews, with an average grade of 6.8 out of 10.

=== Awards and honours ===
Award	Category	Nominee(s)	Result	Ref.
Academy Awards	Best Picture	Melvin Frank	Nominated	
Academy Awards	Best Actress	Glenda Jackson	Won	
Academy Awards	Best Original Screenplay	Melvin Frank and Jack Rose	Nominated	
Academy Awards	Best Original Dramatic Score	John Cameron	Nominated	
Academy Awards	Best Song	"All That Love Went to Waste"; Music by George Barrie; Lyrics by Sammy Cahn	Nominated	
British Academy Film Awards	Best Actress in a Leading Role	Glenda Jackson	Nominated	
British Academy Film Awards	Best Screenplay	Melvin Frank and Jack Rose	Nominated	
Evening Standard British Film Awards	Best Actress	Glenda Jackson	Won	
Golden Globe Awards	Best Motion Picture – Musical or Comedy		Nominated	
Golden Globe Awards	Best Actor in a Motion Picture – Musical or Comedy	George Segal	Won	
Golden Globe Awards	Best Actress in a Motion Picture – Musical or Comedy	Glenda Jackson	Won	
Golden Globe Awards	Best Screenplay – Motion Picture	Melvin Frank and Jack Rose	Nominated	
Golden Globe Awards	Best Original Song – Motion Picture	"All That Love Went to Waste"; Music by George Barrie; Lyrics by Sammy Cahn	Nominated	
Kansas City Film Critics Circle Awards	Best Actor	George Segal	Won	
New York Film Critics Circle Awards	Best Actress	Glenda Jackson	Runner-up	
San Sebastián International Film Festival	Silver Seashell	Melvin Frank	Won	
San Sebastián International Film Festival	Best Actress	Glenda Jackson	Won (Note: Tied with Françoise Fabian for Happy New Year.)	
Writers Guild of America Awards	Best Comedy – Written Directly for the Screen	Melvin Frank and Jack Rose	Won	
Writers' Guild of Great Britain Awards	Best British Screenplay	Melvin Frank and Jack Rose	Won	
Writers' Guild of Great Britain Awards	Best British Original Screenplay	Melvin Frank and Jack Rose	Won	
Writers' Guild of Great Britain Awards	Best British Comedy Screenplay	Melvin Frank and Jack Rose	Won	

== Home media ==
A Touch of Class was released on DVD in North America by Warner Bros. on February 2, 2002, and on Blu-ray by the Warner Archive Collection on September 10, 2019.
