= Domino (2005 film) =

UK-France-USA action film

- Theatrical release poster
- Directed by: Tony Scott
- Screenplay by: Richard Kelly
- Story by: Richard Kelly; Steve Barancik
- Produced by: Samuel Hadida; Tony Scott
- Starring: Keira Knightley; Mickey Rourke; Édgar Ramírez; Delroy Lindo; Mena Suvari; Lucy Liu; Christopher Walken
- Cinematography: Dan Mindel
- Edited by: William Goldenberg; Christian Wagner
- Music by: Harry Gregson-Williams
- Production companies: Scott Free Productions; Davis Films; Summit Entertainment
- Distributed by: Metropolitan Filmexport (France); New Line Cinema (North America); Entertainment Film Distributors (United Kingdom); Summit Entertainment (Overseas)
- Release dates: September 25, 2005 (WFF); October 14, 2005 (United States); November 23, 2005 (France)
- Running time: 127 minutes
- Countries: France; United States; United Kingdom
- Language: English
- Budget: $50 million
- Box office: $23.5 million

Domino is a 2005 action crime film directed by Tony Scott with a screenplay by Richard Kelly from a story by Kelly and Steve Barancik. An international co-production between France, the United States, and the United Kingdom, the film is inspired by Domino Harvey, the English daughter of stage and screen actor Laurence Harvey, who became a Los Angeles bounty hunter.

Its plot flashes back as Domino (Keira Knightley), a fashion-model-turned-bounty-hunter, narrates how a $10 million robbery came about 36 hours before. Supporting actors include Mickey Rourke, Édgar Ramírez, Delroy Lindo, Mena Suvari, Mo'Nique, Lucy Liu, and Christopher Walken. The film is dedicated to Harvey, who died at age 35 from an overdose of fentanyl on 27 June 2005, a few months before the film was released. The film received generally negative reviews from critics, who criticized its plot as overly complicated and excessive. The film bombed at the box office, making $23.5 million on an estimated $50 million budget.

== Plot ==
Domino Harvey, a bounty hunter, has been arrested by the FBI, investigating the theft of $10 million from an armored truck. She is interviewed by criminal psychologist Taryn Mills who tells her everything she knows about the case. Domino explains her profession and the events leading up to the theft with Mills occasionally prompting her to give more detail.

Domino is a former model living in Los Angeles who becomes a bounty hunter when, after being kicked out of college, she notices a newspaper advertisement for a bounty hunter training seminar. Her colleagues are Ed Moseby, Choco, and Afghan driver, Alf. They are employed by Claremont Williams III, a bail bondsman who also runs an armored car business, and whose mistress, Lateesha Rodriguez, works for the California Department of Motor Vehicles. Lateesha's granddaughter Mica is suffering from a blood disease and needs an operation that costs $300,000. Claremont sets up the robbery of $10 million from Drake Bishop, the owner of the Stratosphere Hotel and Casino in Las Vegas and a client of Claremont. His bounty hunters would return the stolen money and collect a $300,000 finder's fee from Bishop.

Lateesha has been running a counterfeit driver's license racket at the DMV. A teenager named Frances arrives at the DMV and asks Lateesha for fake licenses for himself, his brother, and two of their friends. The FBI are tipped about Lateesha's racket. They threaten to send her to jail unless she gives them information about Frances, whom they have been surveilling. Lateesha throws them off the trail by saying that Frances, his brother, and his two friends are going to commit the armored car robbery when in reality she and Claremont are doing it themselves.

Lateesha carries out the robbery with the help of three co-workers. Claremont finds that Frances and his brother are the sons of mafia boss Anthony Cigliutti. He phones Lateesha and tells her to abort the plan, leaving the money with getaway driver Locus Fender, who takes the money to his mother's trailer home. Claremont has the bounty hunters apprehend Frances, his brother, and his two friends and then tells them to deliver them to men working for Drake Bishop. Claremont tells them to retrieve the money from Fender and to deliver it to Bishop at the Stratosphere Casino. Following a shootout with Fender's mother, the $10 million is retrieved. Cigliutti is told about his sons' arrest and is led to believe that Bishop had his sons killed. In reality, Bishop's men released the boys after learning that they did not know anything about the robbery. Believing his sons dead, Cigliutti wants revenge and heads for the Stratosphere. In Las Vegas, Domino takes $300,000 of Bishop's money and gives it to Lateesha for Mica's operation.

At the Stratosphere, the bounty hunters meet with Bishop, who has an armed crew with him. Domino and Bishop discuss the $10 million and what should happen next. Alf has stolen the money and filled the sacks with plastic explosives. He then reveals that he has the remote detonator taped to his hand, and has shipped the money to free Afghanistan. Shortly after this revelation, Cigliutti turns up with his crew. Though Bishop denies he had Cigliutti's sons killed, Cigliutti shoots him and Beckett. In the ensuing gunfight, Choco and Ed are severely wounded but make it into the elevator with Domino. Alf, critically wounded, sacrifices himself to blow up the top of the Stratosphere and Domino is the only survivor.

After telling Taryn Mills everything, Domino is released by the FBI. Mills advises her to retire from bounty hunting. The (nearly) $10 million in boxes is delivered to Afghanistan and opened by celebrating children in the streets, Mica gets her $300,000 operation, and Domino shares a moment with her mother.

== Cast ==
- Keira Knightley as Domino Harvey
- Mickey Rourke as Ed Moseby
- Édgar Ramírez as Choco
- Delroy Lindo as Claremont Williams
- Mo'Nique as Lateesha Rodriguez
- Mena Suvari as Kimmie
- Macy Gray as Lashandra Davis
- Jacqueline Bisset as Sophie Wynn, Domino's mother
- Dabney Coleman as Drake Bishop
- Brian Austin Green as himself
- Ian Ziering as himself
- Stanley Kamel as Anthony Cigliutti
- Peter Jacobson as Burke Beckett
- T. K. Carter as Lester Kincaid
- Kel O'Neill as Frances Cigliutti
- Shondrella Avery as Lashindra Davis
- Lew Temple as Locus Fender
- Lucy Liu as Taryn Mills
- Christopher Walken as Mark Heiss
- Joe Nunez as Raul Chavez
- Morgan Nagler as Stacee Stevens

In addition, Dale Dickey plays Edna Fender, Tom Waits plays the Wanderer, and Riz Abbasi is Alf, the team's driver from Afghanistan. Jerry Springer makes a cameo appearance as himself, hosting his show.

== Production ==
=== Development ===
The real Domino Harvey (1994)

In 1994 director Tony Scott was sent an article from the British newspaper The Mail on Sunday by his business manager Neville Shulman. The article, written by Sacha Gervasi and titled My gun for hire: Why a movie star's rebel daughter turned into a bounty hunter, was about an English woman named Domino Harvey who was working as a bounty hunter, apprehending fugitives who had skipped bail for the Celes King Bail Bond agency in South Central Los Angeles. While Harvey was one of the few female bounty hunters, what caught the attention of Shulman and Scott was that she was the daughter of actor Laurence Harvey.

Tony Scott tracked Domino to Beverly Hills, where she was living at the time with her mother Paulene Stone and Stone's then-husband Peter Morton. He invited Domino to his office, where he proposed a film of her life. Domino agreed and sold Scott the film rights. According to the Los Angeles Times, Harvey was paid $360,000 for the rights. Tony Scott interviewed Harvey about her life and her work bounty hunting. Scott also met and interviewed Ed Martinez and Choco, who were Domino's bounty-hunting colleagues. She took him to meet Celes King III, the bail bondsman they worked for.

20th Century Fox, which had a first refusal deal on the project, turned it down and in the end the film was financed by New Line Cinema.

Steve Barancik wrote the first draft of the screenplay, in 1997, which Scott rejected. A second script was written by Roger Avary, but was also rejected by Scott. Scott described the two rejected screenplays as conventional biopics of Domino Harvey's life, which was not what he had in mind. Finally, Richard Kelly was asked to write the screenplay after Scott read his script for Southland Tales. Kelly was sent transcripts of Domino Harvey's interviews with Tony Scott, but he did not read the scripts that Scott had rejected. In discussing the finished product, Kelly commented that "...Domino might be one of the most subversive films released by a major studio since Fight Club".

Tony Scott thought of Keira Knightley for the role of Domino after seeing her in Pirates of the Caribbean: The Curse of the Black Pearl. Mickey Rourke initially turned down the film, describing the part of bounty hunter Ed Moseby as "one-dimensional"; he agreed to do the film when Scott had the role rewritten.

=== Filming ===
Filming began in Los Angeles on October 4, 2004. Filming locations included the Ambassador Hotel, the Hotel Alexandria, and the Wilshire Grand Hotel. Scenes were also shot at the Santa Monica Department of Motor Vehicles. Filming moved to Nevada in early December 2004. Scenes were filmed at the Valley of Fire State Park, as well as Hoover Dam and Needles, California.

During the final week of production, scenes were filmed over six days at the Stratosphere Hotel and Casino in Las Vegas. Interior shots included the resort's Top of the World restaurant, which was closed at the time for renovations. The Stratosphere was not in the original script. Executive producer Barry Waldman met with the casino's owners in the summer of 2004 to discuss featuring it in the movie, which the owners agreed to after small changes were made to the script. Tony Scott said an eight-minute BMW commercial he shot at the resort was "a testing ground" for Domino.

Scenes were filmed at the Bonnie Springs Ranch motel on December 20, 2004. Scott had wanted to include the ranch and the Valley of Fire in one of his movies. The following day, scenes were filmed at the Stardust Resort and Casino's Starlight Lounge. Filming concluded on December 22, 2004, after scenes were shot at the intersection of South Las Vegas Boulevard and Sahara Avenue. Filming lasted a combined total of 62 days.

== Release ==
The release date of the film was announced and delayed several times. The original release date was August 19, 2005. On May 22, 2005, the release date was changed to November 4, 2005. On June 28, 2005, a day after Harvey's death, the release date was changed to November 23, 2005. On July 11, 2005, it was moved to October 14, 2005, which was the date the film was released on. The film had its premiere on October 11, 2005, in Los Angeles.

The film was released on October 14, 2005, in 2,223 theaters across America and grossed $4,670,120 on its opening weekend. The film stayed in release for four weeks and ended up with a gross of $10,169,202. In other territories, the film grossed $13,404,855 which, added to the domestic gross, gave the film a total worldwide gross of $23,574,057. This was a box-office flop compared to the film's estimated $50 million cost.

== Reception ==
On the review aggregator website Rotten Tomatoes, 18% of 154 critics' reviews are positive, with an average rating of 4.1/10. The website's consensus reads: "The life story of model-turned-bounty-hunter Domino Harvey struggles to get out of this overwrought and excessive biopic." On Metacritic, the film has a weighted average score of 37 out of 100, based on 36 reviews, which it ranks as "generally unfavorable". Audiences surveyed by CinemaScore gave the film a grade "C+" on scale of A to F.

Owen Gleiberman in Entertainment Weekly gave Domino a 'D' grade, describing it as "trash shot to look like art imitating trash". Gleiberman criticized the plot as "so dense with ersatz Elmore Leonard convolutions that it manages to stay three steps ahead of the audience and four steps behind common sense". Kenneth Turan in the Los Angeles Times also criticized the story, saying that the film was "so over-plotted that it's borderline incomprehensible". A more positive review came from Jeff Otto at IGN who praised the film for originality and also praised the acting. Otto stated that "the final result is a bit of a mess, but it's one hell of an entertaining mess". Roger Ebert of the Chicago Sun-Times also wrote a positive review, giving the film three stars and saying he admired it. The film was among Tony Scott's favorites of his own films, although he was also very critical of it, saying, "I didn't let the movie breathe enough. The script was great—Richard Kelly wrote a great script—and I got overcome by the insanity of the world I was touching. I think I fucked up on that one."

== Home media ==
The film was released on DVD and VHS on February 21, 2006. The DVD contained several extra features including an audio commentary with Tony Scott and Richard Kelly, deleted scenes from the film, featurettes on Domino Harvey and the visual style of the film, the teaser trailer and the theatrical trailer. While the film was released in its original widescreen format in all DVD regions, the film was also released in a full screen format on Region 1. The film was released on Blu-ray on January 20, 2009.

== See also ==
- List of American films of 2005
- List of films set in Las Vegas
