= Peter Morton =

American businessman (born 1947)

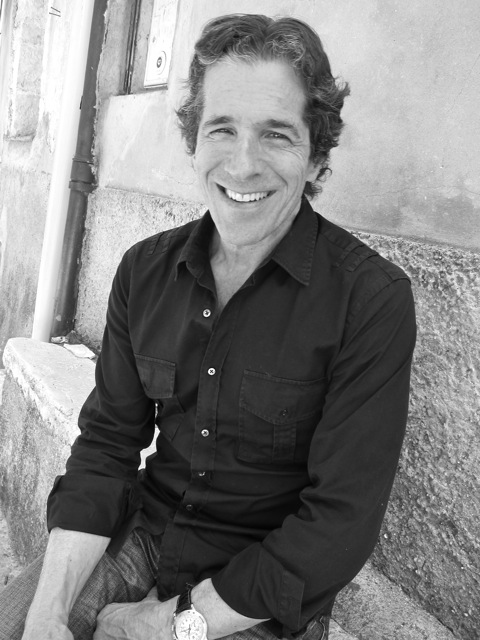
- Morton in 2011
- Born: Peter Alan Morton; August 7, 1947 (age 79); Chicago, Illinois, U.S.
- Education: University of Denver
- Occupation: Businessman
- Known for: Co-founder of Hard Rock Cafe
- Spouses: Paulene Stone (m. 1980–1986) Tarlton Pauley (m. 1990–1997)
- Children: 3, including Harry Morton
- Parent: Arnie Morton

Peter Alan Morton (born August 7, 1947) is an American businessman. He is the co-founder of Hard Rock Cafe (along with Isaac Burton Tigrett), a chain of casual dining restaurants.

== Early life and education ==
Morton is the son of Adleen June (Savin) and Arnie Morton, founder of the Morton's Steakhouse chain. He is of Jewish heritage. In 1969, he graduated from the University of Denver with a B.S.B.A. in restaurant and hotel management. His twin sister is Pam Morton; and his half-brother is restaurateur and businessman Michael Morton. He was a member of the Phi Sigma Delta fraternity.

== Career ==
Morton's first Hard Rock Cafe opened near Hyde Park Corner in London. The chain began global expansion in 1982 when Morton and his partner, Isaac Tigrett, agreed to develop their own cafes in various cities. Morton (Hard Rock America) opened Hard Rocks in Los Angeles, San Francisco, Chicago, and Houston, Las Vegas; San Diego, La Jolla, and Newport Beach, California; Sydney and Melbourne, Australia; Honolulu and Maui, Hawaii; among others. In 1995, The Rank Organisation (now The Rank Group) acquired the cafes owned by Morton, but Morton retained the Hard Rock Hotel & Casino in Las Vegas.

In May 2006, Morton sold the Hard Rock Hotel & Casino in Las Vegas to New York-based Morgans Hotel Group. The sale included the rights to the Hard Rock Hotel brand West of the Mississippi River which includes Texas, California, Australia and Vancouver, British Columbia. Morton later founded Morton's Restaurant in Los Angeles.

== Personal life ==
His first wife was Paulene Stone, the widow of actor Laurence Harvey and later wife of actor Mark Burns. They had one son, Harry Morton (1981–2019), the founder of Pink Taco restaurants. His former stepdaughter with Stone was Domino Harvey, the subject of the October 2005 film Domino starring Keira Knightley and directed by Tony Scott. They divorced in 1986.

In 1990, he married Tarlton Pauley (1962–2017); they had two children, before divorcing in 1997.

=== Community involvement ===
Morton is a member of the Board of Trustees for the Museum of Contemporary Art, Los Angeles (MOCA) and sits on the board of trustees for the Natural Resources Defense Council (NRDC). After Morton made a donation to UCLA, the building at 200 UCLA Medical Plaza was renamed the Peter Morton Medical Building.
