= Alexander Archdale =

British actor and theater producer (1905–1986)

- Alexander Archdale in 1960's Village of the Damned
- Born: Alexander Mervvn Archdale; 26 November 1905; Jhansi, United Provinces of Agra and Oudh, British India
- Died: 13 May 1986 (aged 80); Sydney, Australia
- Occupations: Actor, manager, theatre producer
- Family: Betty Archdale (sister)

Alexander Mervyn Archdale (26 November 1905 – 13 May 1986) was a British actor, manager and theatre producer. He had a very long career in both the theatre and in film, stretching from the 1930s to the 1980s. He spent the latter part of his life and career in Australia.

== Biography ==
He was born Alexander Mervyn Archdale in Jhansi, United Provinces of Agra and Oudh, British India, to British parents Theodore Montgomery Archdale and Helen Alexandra Russell, the famous suffragette and educationalist. His younger sister was the educationalist and cricketer Betty Archdale.

In 1934 he was in a Broadway production of The Wind and the Rain at the Ritz Theatre, New York City.

In 1937 he acted in Jeffrey Dell's play Night Alone at the Embassy Theatre in London, with Richard Bird, Julian Somers, and Anna Konstam in the cast. In the same year he acted in J. B. Priestley's play Time and the Conways at the Duchess Theatre in London, with Jean Forbes-Robertson, Raymond Huntley, Barbara Everest, Mervyn Johns, Helen Horsey, Eileen Erskine, Wilfred Babbage, Molly Rankin, Rosemary Scott, and Irene Hentschel in the cast.

He appeared in British films of the 1930s and 1940s, for instance Lucky Days and House of Darkness (with a young Laurence Harvey) before going on to appear in TV series such as Ivanhoe, No Hiding Place and Emergency Ward 10.

Later in his career he was a regular on Australian television performing in Hunter, Skippy and Division 4.

He was Sir Charles in Newsfront, a 1978 film directed by Phillip Noyce, which tells the story of rival companies making newsreels in the pre-television Australia of the late 1940s and 1950s.

He played the part of retired Professor B. C. Simmonds in the 1981 Australian thriller The Killing of Angel Street, which won an Honourable Mention at the Berlin International Film Festival in 1982.

His last credited appearance was in Runaway Island, which was set in 1830s Sydney.

He died on 13 May 1986 at the age of 80 in Sydney.

== Selected filmography ==
=== Film ===
- Lucky Days (1935) as Alec
- House of Darkness (1948) as John
- Floodtide (1949) as 2nd Director
- His Majesty O'Keefe (1954)
- Three in One (1957) as Firbank
- The Scapegoat (1959) as Gamekeeper
- The Headless Ghost (1959) as Randolph
- Marriage of Convenience (1960) as Governor
- Village of the Damned (1960)
- Invasion Quartet (1961) as Brigadier, War Office
- I Have Been Here Before (TV movie, 1964) as Walter Ormond
- The Adventures of Barry McKenzie (1972)
- The Night the Prowler (1978)
- Newsfront (1978) as Sir Charles
- The Killing of Angel Street (1981) as B.C. Simmonds
- Runaway Island (TV movie, 1982)

=== Television ===
- The Twelve Pound Look (1956)
- Redheap (1972, TV series)
- Hunter as regular cast
- Skippy the Bush Kangaroo as regular cast
- Division 4 as regular cast
- Ivanhoe (1970)
- No Hiding Place
- Emergency Ward 10

== Theatre ==
- The Mews (1932) at Arts Theatre Club
- The Wind and the Rain (1934) at Ritz Theatre, New York
- Night Alone (1937) at Embassy Theatre, London
- Time and the Conways (1937) at Duchess Theatre, London
- Charley's Aunt (1953) (also director) at St James' Hall with Mercury Theatre
- Night on Bald Mountain (1964) as Professor Hugo Swire
- No Man's Land (1977) with The Actors' Company

== External sources ==
- Alexander Archdale at the Internet Movie Database
- Alexander Archdale at the Internet Broadway Database
- Photos of Alexander Archdale at Aveleyman
- A Who's who of Australian and New Zealand Film Actors: The Sound Era h
- Theatre Australia (un)limited: Australian Theatre Since the 1950s h
- The importance of Marian Street Theatre – images of Alexander Archdale http://www.savemariansttheatre.com/a-brief-history/
