= Othello (1950 film) =

- Sunday Night Theatre episode
- Episode no.: Series 1 Episode 17
- Directed by: George More O'Farrall
- Teleplay by: George Skillan
- Based on: "Othello" by William Shakespeare
- Original air date: April 23, 1950
- Running time: 143 minutes

Othello is a British television play, produced by the BBC and first broadcast live on Sunday, April 23, 1950. It is an adaptation of the tragedy of the same name by William Shakespeare. The production ran as part of the BBC's Sunday Night Theatre series. A second live performance took place the following Thursday, April 27.

Actor and Shakespearean scholar George Skillan penned the adaptation for television, which was directed by Kevin Sheldon. The play was produced by George More O’Ferrall for the BBC with Sheldon additionally serving as associate producer. Music was composed by Clifton Parker, with art direction by Barry Learoyd.

The production is notable for being one of the earliest major televised versions of the play in the United Kingdom, featuring André Morell in the title role. Additionally, it is the television debut of Joan Hopkins.

A preview of the production in Radio Times noted, "we spent an hour the other day watching George More O’Ferrall rehearse a distinguished cast in Othello," going on to say that O’Ferrall made advantageous use of the intimacy of the television medium when handling Iago’s reflective soliloquies: "by allowing the actor to speak softly he gives an impression of musing aloud that could hardly be achieved if the voice had to carry through a theatre."

The production received mixed reviews; Manchester Evening News called it "brilliant" while The Observer called it "dull as a duster". Lionel Hale, television drama critic for Radio Times, found "Andre Morrell’s Othello himself too much confined, too conversational, in this production ... Stephen Murray’s Iago, though missing all the sergeant-major quality of the part, substituted a mastery of its own; and, throughout, the production elucidated the play with a magnificent command of both meaning and movement." He ended the review, "I confess to having found Othello enthralling."

== Cast ==
- André Morell as Othello
- Frank Birch as Brabantio
- Stephen Murray as Iago
- Joan Hopkins as Desdemona
- Pamela Arliss as Bianca
- Laurence Harvey as Cassio
- Alan Wheatley as Roderigo
- Arthur Wontner as the Duke of Venice
- Bryan Coleman as Montano
- Patrick Macnee as Lodovico
- Charles Doran as Senator
- David Askey as Senator
- Donovan Winter as Sailor
- George Skillan as Gratiano
- John Benson as Gentleman
- Lisa Bodington as Attendant
