= Domino Harvey =

English bounty hunter (1969–2005)

- Harvey in 1994
- Born: 7 August 1969; London, England
- Died: 27 June 2005 (aged 35); Los Angeles, California, U.S.
- Occupation: Bounty hunter
- Parent(s): Laurence Harvey; Paulene Stone
- Relatives: Harry Morton (half-brother)

Domino Harvey (7 August 1969 – 27 June 2005) was an English bounty hunter in the United States. She came from a well-to-do background, and was the daughter of actor Laurence Harvey and fashion model Paulene Stone. Harvey's fame was increased posthumously by the 2005 release of the film Domino, which was loosely based on her life, in which Harvey was portrayed by Keira Knightley.

== Early life ==
Domino Harvey was born on 7 August 1969 in Hammersmith, London, to the actor Laurence Harvey and fashion model Paulene Stone. Laurence Harvey was still married to Joan Cohn until 1972; he married Stone shortly after divorcing Cohn. After Laurence Harvey died of cancer in 1973, Stone raised Domino in Belgravia, a very affluent area of London. As a girl, Harvey was a tomboy and enjoyed playing with action figures. She later recalled that she studied martial arts and frequently fought other children. She attended four boarding schools, including Dartington Hall and Frensham Heights, and was expelled from some of them.

== Career ==
Harvey dropped out of school as a teenager to pursue a career in modelling, but did not enjoy it. She later claimed to have attended the Lee Strasberg Institute and been represented by the Ford Modeling Agency; in a 2005 article, Aida Edemariam of The Guardian noted that she was unable to verify these claims independently, no-one having any recollection of Harvey. Harvey studied sound engineering and worked as a DJ at several clubs in London, managing one of them. Around that time, she lived in Notting Hill and also designed and sold T-shirts at Kensington Market, London. At age 19, after spending time on a kibbutz in Israel, Harvey moved to Southern California, where her mother had relocated years earlier after marrying the American businessman Peter Morton. Harvey had previously resisted the idea of moving to the United States.

In California, Harvey initially started working as a DJ at clubs in Los Angeles. She then worked on a ranch near San Diego, and served as a volunteer firefighter in Boulevard, California. At that time, her friends trained her in the use of firearms. After serving as a volunteer firefighter for a year, Harvey trained as an EMT and took courses in fire science. In 1993, she unsuccessfully applied to the Los Angeles Fire Department, and then enrolled in a short course to become a bail recovery agent, or bounty hunter.

== Bounty hunting ==
After completing a bail recovery agent training course, Harvey began working with the teacher of the course, Ed Martinez, at a bail bond agency in South Los Angeles run by Celes King III. As one of very few women working as bounty hunters in the United States, she primarily sought drug dealers and thieves, but occasionally tracked murderers. She enjoyed the work, and Martinez later said she was one of the most skilled bounty hunters he knew. She primarily worked with two other bounty hunters when tracking fugitives. During their operations, she occasionally posed as a lost tourist.

Harvey collected swords and knives, and kept AK-47s in her apartment. As a bounty hunter in the mid-1990s, Harvey earned roughly $30,000–40,000 annually. The agency where Harvey worked was paid 10% of the bail posted by each fugitive they caught. She said she chose bounty hunting for the excitement of the work, even though it was not a high-paying job. She typically worked in Southern California, but on one occasion travelled across the United States to Atlanta, Georgia, to seek one of the FBI Ten Most Wanted Fugitives.

Harvey lived above the garage of her mother's home in Beverly Hills, California. After she began working as a bounty hunter, the Daily Mail published an article about her. Director Tony Scott read the article and contacted Harvey. They soon became friends and regularly visited each other; Scott spent time observing her while she tracked fugitives. Their friendship lasted for the rest of her life.

== Addiction and death ==
Harvey entered drug rehabilitation clinics four times; each stay was funded by her mother. Scott claims that Harvey and the bounty hunters with whom she worked would often keep drugs they found when arresting criminals. Martinez has said that they used marijuana, cocaine and heroin. In 1997, Harvey went to a drug rehabilitation clinic in Hawaii. She lived in Hawaii for two years. In 2001, having returned to California, she attempted to become a bounty hunter again but was unable to find work with her previous employer.

In 2003, Harvey was arrested on charges of possession of crystal methamphetamine after sheriff's deputies found the drug at her home while investigating a burglar alarm call-out. She pleaded guilty and attended a treatment program; the arrest was consequently expunged from her criminal record. In May 2005, Harvey was arrested on federal charges of trafficking methamphetamine; she maintained that she was innocent. She spent three weeks in the Metropolitan Detention Center, Los Angeles. She posted $1 million bail and was placed under house arrest, staying at her home in West Hollywood. While under house arrest, Harvey wore an electronic monitoring ankle bracelet.

Harvey continually denied that she was a drug trafficker, claiming to have been set up. While under house arrest, she lived with a person whom she had hired as a "sober guardian" to help her refrain from drug use. On the night of 27 June 2005, her aide discovered her unconscious in her bath. She was taken to a hospital but could not be resuscitated. The Los Angeles County Department of Medical Examiner-Coroner determined that she had overdosed on fentanyl.

Harvey and her father are buried next to one another at the Santa Barbara Cemetery in California.

== In popular culture ==
A film inspired by her life, Domino, was released in 2005. In his preparations for the film, director Tony Scott taped hours of conversations he had with Harvey about bounty hunting incidents. During filming, Harvey spent three weeks on the set. Following tabloid reports that the ending was changed after her death, Scott confirmed that those speculations were untrue. The same tabloids had stated that she was unhappy with the film's portrayal of her. The film studio countered that she was involved with the project for nearly 12 years, with promotional featurettes for the movie including Harvey on set with the cast and crew; she contributed to the soundtrack and also attended the movie's wrap party in December 2004. Harvey herself appears at the very end of the cast credits of the film. She never saw the film released, dying four months before its premiere in October 2005.

== Bibliography ==
- "Model, bounty hunter, addict—The story of Domino Harvey". The Times. 29 June 2005.
- Edemariam, Aida (29 June 2005). "She loved bringing in sleazebags". The Guardian.
- "Domino Harvey". The Telegraph. 30 June 2005.
- Evans, Peter (4 September 2005). "Farewell to my gun-toting daughter". The Sunday Times.
- Weiner, Allison Hope (9 October 2005). "A Lust for Life and Danger". The New York Times.
- Meyer, Norma (October 14, 2005). "Real 'Domino' took a bad turn, with a San Diego stop". U-T San Diego. Copley News Service.
