= Rebecca N. Porter =

American author, educator (1883–1963)

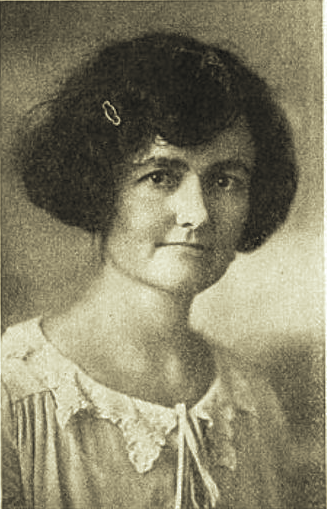
- Porter in 1925
- Born: January 5, 1883; Chicago, Illinois, U.S.
- Died: September 26, 1963 (aged 80); Santa Barbara, California, U.S.
- Resting place: Santa Barbara Cemetery
- Education: University of California, Berkeley
- Occupations: educator; author; journalist
- Spouses: Archer Moresby-White; 1931
- Writing career
- Genres: features; film reviews; short stories; novels; essays
- Notable work: Raisin Valley
- Notable awards: Essay prize, American Federation of Women's Clubs

Rebecca N. Porter (after marriage, White; 1883–1963) was an American educator, author, and journalist. With a career that included newspaper reporting, reviewing movies, and lecturing, she wrote innumerable short stories and articles, as well as novels. Porter was a writing instructor in short stories and novels, under the University of California Extension Division. Scribner's Magazine printed a series of her articles on adult education based primarily on her work with extension students in her classes in short story writing. She published many articles on general subjects and also novels. Her gift for developing craftsmanship in her students was characterized as unusual. It was the books of traveling buyers who stayed at her father's raisin ranch in California which first made Porter want to write.

== Early life and education ==
Rebecca Newman Porter was born in Chicago, Illinois, on January 5, 1883. Her parents were William S. and Martha Newman Porter. Rebecca had at least three siblings.

Her first impetus to write came on her father's raisin ranch in California. Raisin-growing was a hard business in those days. To the always precarious problem of weather were added labor, transportation and market difficulties. She became fond of "traveling men" – buyers from Chicago and New York City who brought romance and adventure in the form of paperback novels. By the time she was ten, she had exhausted all the classics in the family's bookcase, and the circulating library in the home town was both remote and impoverished. The traveling men who stayed at the Porter house brought with them and left in their rooms, the books they had purchased to relieve the tedium of a transcontinental journey. Porter hid her collection of fiction from her mother. Her reading was also supplemented by Bible lore and English and French classics. The fiction broadened her vision and give her some foretaste of life. It was this paperback fiction, some of it good, some very bad, which first gave Porter the desire to write. Love for some of the classics grew stronger with many re-readings, but it was the books of the traveling buyers which first made Porter want to write.

Her high school education was in Hanford, California.

There were some excellent writing courses in college between the years 1905 and 1909, and the instructors offered some individual conferences, which were very helpful to Porter. Social service work on the Oakland, California waterfront during Porter's college days gave her some excellent contacts. These social clubs did everything from debating and giving plays to weaving rag rugs and holding dances. While a college student, she wrote for the San Francisco Bulletin. She graduated University of California, Berkeley in 1909.

== Career ==
Her real training for fiction writing was given in newspaper offices. In her college days, Porter reported for a San Francisco paper, and later went on that same paper as a staff feature writer. Other newspaper positions followed during the period of 1912–16. She described it as good discipline for the writing game, but also that a prospective writer must realize about newspaper work is that there comes a time when it should be given up as staying in it too long ruins style and outlook.

The atmosphere of the raisin ranch and the Oakland waterfront gave Porter the material for her first published stories. In several of them, she combined the two; these were accepted by The Ladies' Home Journal and the Woman's Home Companion. She also wrote short stories for Munsey's, Scribner's, Century, and Pictorial Review.

The novels, The Girl from Four Corners (Holt) and The Rest Hollow Mystery (Century; later also published in England) were both written while Porter was doing newspaper work in Santa Barbara, California for the Morning Press.

Porter was a teacher of English at Miss Head's School, Berkeley, California, 1908–11, and a Coach in English at the A-to-Zed School, 1915. Immediately following the publication of The Rest Hollow Mystery, she joined the University of California Extension faculty as instructor in short story-writing and lecturer on subjects related to fiction-writing. For Porter, the next greatest pleasure to writing successfully was to help other people write successfully. She got a thrill every time one of her students appeared in print. She served as a lecturer at large for ten years. Her lecture topics included: "Story Writing as a Profession", "Tendencies In Modern Day Fic"Adventures in a Fiction Factory", and "The Literary Critic: Who and Why Is He?".

She published four mystery novels as well as I’d Love to Write, which included student writer character sketches. Raisin Valley, an autobiographical novel, was her best-known novel. Other novels included The Rhinestone Helmet, The Man from Nowhere, and Open House; Resthollow was set in Montecito, California.

The university work gave impetus to another line of literary endeavor: essay-writing. It was a profitable field for Porter, and relieved the strain of protracted fiction work. In 1925, she went to England where she had been sent by an Eastern magazine to study the development of adult education, preparatory to writing a series of articles on the subject.

When asked why she didn't give up helping others to write and devote herself exclusively to writing, she responded that not only did it give her pleasure to be responsible in some measure for another person's success, but teaching others provided an ever-growing circle of human contacts, which Porter needed in her own fiction-writing business.

During World War II, Porter White worked in Hollywood as a film reviewer.

She was a member of the American Association of University Women, the Santa Barbara Woman's Club, the Cottage Hospital Auxiliary, and the First Presbyterian Church. Porter was also a member of PEN San Francisco and co-organizer of PEN Los Angeles.

== Personal life ==
On May 28, 1931, in Santa Barbara, she married Archer Moresby-White, who had served in the British diplomatic corps, before his work as an attorney in Hollywood.

For years, she made her home in Berkeley, California. A resident of Santa Barbara since 1942, Rebecca Newman Porter Smith died there on September 26, 1963. Interment was at Santa Barbara Cemetery.

== Awards and honors ==
- 1924, essay prize for "What Two Million Women Want of the Publishers", American Federation of Women's Clubs

== Selected works ==
=== Novels ===
- Afterglow, 1963 (text)
- The Girl from Four Corners : a romance of California to-day, 1920 (text)
- The Man from Nowhere, 1931
- Open House, 1956
- Raisin Valley, 1953 (text)
- The Rest Hollow Mystery, 1922 (text)
- The Rhinestone Helmet, 1927

=== Non-fiction ===
- I’d Love to Write

=== Short stories ===
- As He Told It to Her Daughter, Ladies' Home Journal, July 1914
- The Corner Table, National Magazine, November 1913
- For the Benefit of the Belgians, Scribner's Magazine, June 1922
- God of Luck, Ladies' Home Journal, April 1913
- The Rhinestone Helmet, Argosy Allstory Weekly. Mar 10, Mar 17, Mar 24 1928
- "Some Story", The Youth's Companion, October 5, 1922
- The Wives of Xerxes, Scribner's Magazine, January 1921
