= Paulene Stone =

British former model (born 1941)

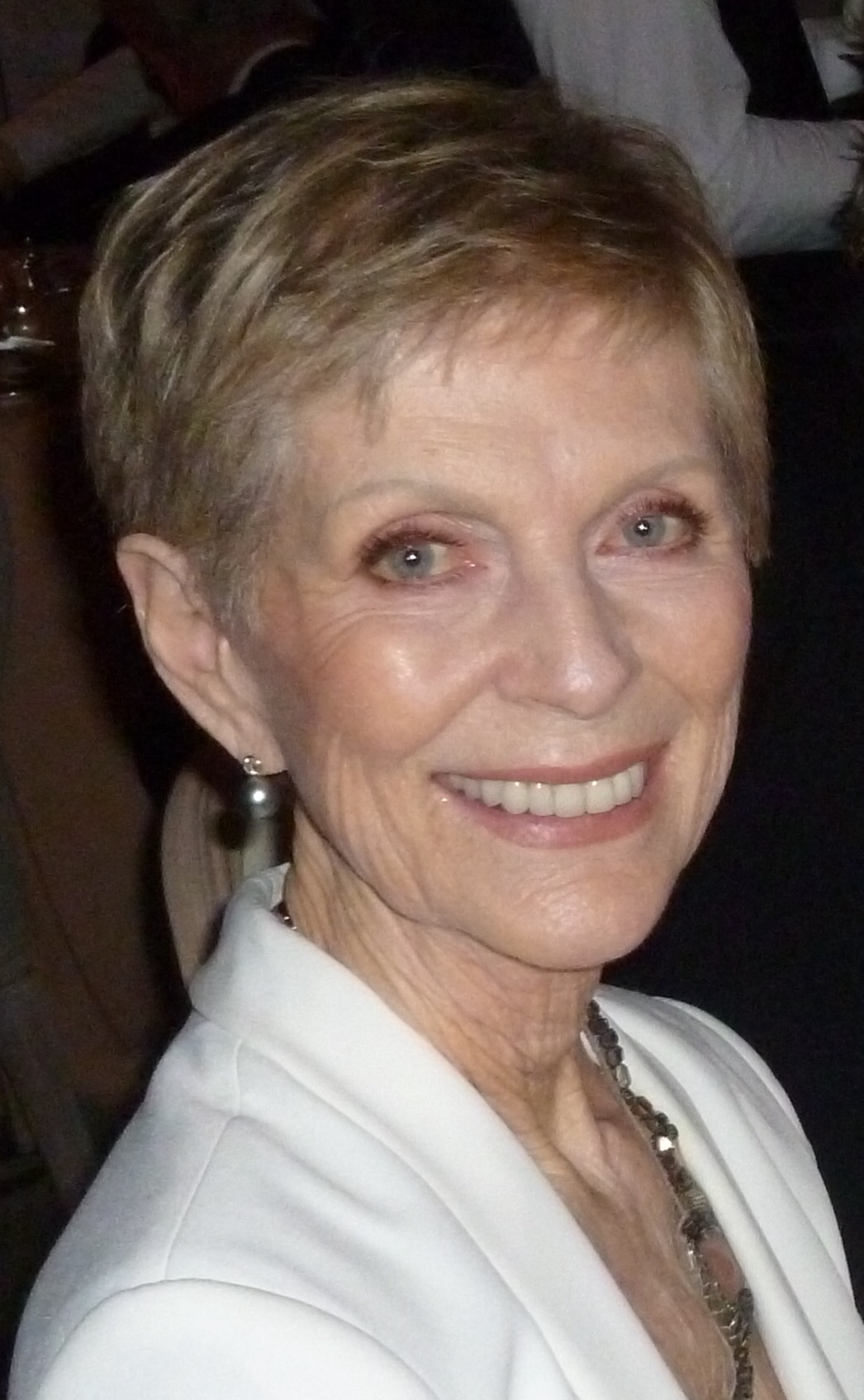
- Stone in 2016
- Born: 10 May 1941 (age 84); Guildford, England
- Occupation: Fashion model
- Spouses: Tony Norris (m. 1963; div. 1967) Laurence Harvey (m. 1972; died 1973) Peter Morton (m. 1978; div. 1986) Mark Burns (m. 1995; died 2007)
- Children: 3 (2 deceased), including Domino Harvey and Harry Morton

Paulene Stone (born 10 May 1941) is a British former model. She was a Vogue cover girl who embodied Swinging London in the 1960s.

== Early life and career ==
Born in Guildford, she left school at the age of 16 to work in central London, commuting daily from her home in Goring-by-Sea. After winning a modeling competition (the prize being £100 and a three-week course at the Cherry Marshall Modelling Agency), she began her career as a model. A 1960 photo that ran in the Daily Express of her crouching down with a squirrel led to a contract with Vogue magazine and also launched the career of the photographer David Bailey.

== Personal life ==
In 1963, Stone married Tony Norris, with whom she had one daughter, Sophie Harvey. The couple divorced in 1967.

In 1969, Stone gave birth to actor Laurence Harvey's only child, Domino Harvey, while he was still married to Joan Perry. Stone eventually married Harvey in 1972, the marriage lasting only a year before his sudden death from cancer in 1973.

In 1978, Paulene Stone married Peter Morton, co-founder of the Hard Rock Cafe restaurant chain, and moved to Los Angeles. They had one son, restaurateur Harry Morton. They divorced in 1986.

Stone's fourth marriage, in 1995, was to actor Mark Burns to whom she remained married until his death in May 2007.

In Domino, the film about the life of Stone's daughter Domino, Paulene is played by actress Jacqueline Bisset. Stone, however, requested that her name not be used in the film and therefore the character was renamed Sophie Wynn.
