= The Actors' Company =

Theatre company in Sydney, Australia

The Actors’ Company was a co-operative theatre company formed by a group of actors and directors in Sydney, Australia in 1975. It was the first serious attempt at a professional co-operative theatre in that city.

The company's name was inspired by the Actors’ Company founded by Ian McKellen, Edward Petherbridge and John Moreno in the UK in 1972. (The title was again used for an ensemble of actors created by the Sydney Theatre Company which functioned between 2006 and 2008.)

== History ==
Between 1975 and 1979, the company staged more than 40 productions at various venues in Sydney, many of which then toured New South Wales, Queensland and South Australia. The company was established in late 1974 by four actors and directors – Rodney Delaney, Matthew O'Sullivan, Betty Cheal and Lynne Porteous. The fledgling company, with Rodney Delaney and Matthew O'Sullivan as co-artistic directors, secured, for their opening productions, the building in King's Cross that had been the Nimrod Street Theatre, the Nimrod company having moved to their new space in Belvoir Street, Surrey Hills. The Nimrod Street Theatre had been renamed the Loft. (Currently home to the Griffin Theatre Company, it is now known as the Stables Theatre.)

== First season ==
On Thursday, March 27, 1975 The Actors Company opened their first season. Dubbed a ‘Season of Anger’, it comprised John Osborne's “Look Back in Anger” directed by Rodney Delaney, with Matthew O'Sullivan as Jimmy Porter and Lynne Porteous as Helena and (two days later) “A Taste of Honey” by Shelagh Delaney, directed by Matthew O'Sullivan, with Rodney Delaney as Geoffrey and Betty Cheal as Helen. Neither play had been seen in Sydney for many years. They were performed on alternate nights for six weeks. The season returned a small net profit allowing token fees for the cast and crew. . With the success of this first outing, the group decided on a second season keeping to the same formula of two plays in repertoire, with the same cast where ever possible.

The Loft was no longer available. so the next season was staged in the Village Centre Playhouse, a converted church hall in Paddington. The season comprised the Australian premiere of “The Golden Pathway Annual” by John Harding and John Burrows, and Harold Pinter's “The Caretaker”.

The critics were unanimous in their praise and both productions were picked up by the Arts Council of New South Wales for a seven-week tour of regional centres.

== Seymour Centre ==
The company was offered the chance to take over the Downstairs Theatre of the newly opened Seymour Centre, a three-theatre complex on the campus of the University of Sydney. For the third season, their first in the new theatre, the company staged two Australian premieres: Woody Allen's “Play it Again, Sam” (with Les Asmussen as Allen) and “The Foursome” by E.A.Whitehead, plus a late night show, “Brecht on Brecht”.

The critics and audiences were divided on the merits of the somewhat confronting (for its time) “The Foursome”, but “Play It Again, Sam” was a runaway hit playing an additional two weeks. The company could not meet the costs of operating in what was basically a commercially-run theatre. At the end of their first year of operation, with three seasons in three different venues, they were again looking for a home.

== Their own theatre ==
A search led them to the Esme Hackett Memorial Hall in the inner-city suburb of Ultimo. It was an all-purpose community hall dating from the 1950s, ill-served by public transport – but it was available and it was cheap. At the beginning of 1976, “The Golden Pathway Annual” toured to Queensland, then played a short return season in Sydney as the opening production of what was now The Actors Company Theatre. An American programme of “Promenade, All” by David Robison (another Australian premiere) and Eugene O'Neill's little-seen “Desire Under the Elms” played through April and May. At the same time, “The Golden Pathway Annual” and “Play It Again, Sam” were revived in Adelaide, South Australia at the invitation of the Adelaide Festival Centre. In June “Hamlet”, with Matthew O'Sullivan in the title role, was staged at the Bondi Pavilion Theatre. Official recognition also came with a one-off grant of $8,000 from the Australia Council and $1,000 from the NSW Government. July saw a return season of “Play It Again, Sam”, followed by the company's first children's show, “The Happy Apples”. A double bill of Ionesco's “The Lesson” and Olwyn Wymark's “Lunchtime Concert” played through September–October; “Waiting for Godot” by Samuel Beckett was staged in October–November. The year ended with a revue, “And Now at Last the Nibble Nobby's Nuts Show”, devised and directed by Rodney Delaney (who was also in the cast) and, by day, Matthew O'Sullivan's adaptation (he also directed) of “Winnie The Pooh”.

== Staff ==
The company comprised a core group of five people – Rodney Delaney and Matthew O'Sullivan (the two artistic directors), administrator Michael Tobin, Sonia Lester (public relations and marketing) and stage manager Tony Wright (who also directed “The Happy Apples”). Guest directors were hired for ”Hamlet”, “Lunchtime Concert” and “Waiting for Godot”.

== Third year ==
The company went into its third year with a major reconfiguration of the acting space. A triangular stage was created in the centre of the hall with raked bench seating on two sides, seating approximately 100 people. The year began with a revival of Harold Pinter's “The Caretaker” in March, directed this time by Alan Faulkner, but the repertoire system of two plays was resumed in June with “The ‘Naked’ Hamlet”, Joseph Papp's radical reworking of “Hamlet”, and Tom Stoppard's “Rosencrantz and Guildenstern Are Dead”. The latter play hadn't been seen in Sydney since its original production and became one of the company's biggest successes. Both plays were directed by Rodney Delaney with a total of twelve actors - the largest casts employed so far. The cast played the same roles in both productions with Peter de Salis as Hamlet, Les Asmussen and Scott Lambert as Rosencrantz and Guildenstern. September and October saw a children's play, “The Tails of Koalaroo” during the day, and Ibsen's “Ghosts” and “City Sugar” by Stephen Poliakoff with Bevan Wilson(another Australian premiere) alternating at night. November–December brought another Pinter play, the Australian premiere of “No Man's Land” with Rodney Delaney directing veteran British actor Alexander Archdale.

== Last year ==
Shakespeare's Othello was the opening production of 1978, and Matthew O'Sullivan's final production as co-artistic director. The eight-week season was almost booked out before it opened but a huge fire in the block behind the Ultimo theatre forced the closure of the building for some weeks. The Mayfair Theatre, an 800-seat Hoyts cinema in the Sydney CBD, was offered as an alternative. “Othello” transferred there for a further week before a short tour to NSW regional centres. Othello was initially played by Fred Steele, the first time in Australia that the role had been played by an African-American actor. The Actors’ Company Theatre reopened with a production of “Romeo and Juliet” directed by Steve Agnew. This was followed by the company's most successful production, both critically and financially: Rodney Delaney directed “The Glass Menagerie” with Shirley Cameron and Diana O’Connor. “Razzle Dazzle, the Silver Screen Blues” with Sally McKenzie occupied the late-night spot. Amanda Field directed another children's show at this time: “The Ugly Duckling” with Bernadette Ludwig.

In September–October the Company did three Australian works: David Williamson's “The Removalists”, “Halloran’s Little Boat” by Thomas Keneally and “An Evening with Adolf Hitler”. This latter was the world premiere of a play co-written by poet and playwright Jennifer Compton and Matthew O’Sullivan, who also directed and played Hitler.

The Actors’ Company did its first (and as it turned out, only) musical in December 1978. This was Kander and Ebb's “Cabaret” featuring Anne Phelan as Sally Bowles and Les Asmussen as the Emcee. The children's play during January, again directed by Amanda Field, was “Phoebe Moonglow and the Singing Astronaut”. Late night: Tim Gooding's “The Amazing Optisimo Show”.

A new production of “Othello” directed by David Goddard and starring Monroe Reimers, opened in late March and played through till May. This became the final production in the Actors’ Company Theatre.

== Closing ==
The last Actors’ Company production opened on August 8, 1979 at another Hoyts cinema, the Paris. It was a revival of the previous year's The Glass Menagerie, again directed by Rodney Delaney, but with a different cast. It closed August 25.

The Actors’ Company was dismantled after that production. It had lasted over four years. Matthew O’Sullivan left the company in 1978 to further his career in theatre and film. Rodney Delaney became, for a time, the Regional Theatre Co-ordinator for the NSW government and has continued his successful directing career. Sonia Lester, publicity officer for the company, remarried and, as Sonia Gidley-King, created Wrap With Love in 1992, for which she was awarded an OAM. She died in 2010.
