= House of Darkness (1948 film) =

- Original trade ad in Kinematograph Weekly
- Directed by: Oswald Mitchell
- Written by: John Gilling
- Based on: radio play Duet by Betty Davies
- Produced by: Harry Reynolds
- Starring: Henry Oscar; Laurence Harvey
- Cinematography: Cyril Bristow
- Music by: George Melachrino (musical director)
- Production company: International Motion Pictures
- Distributed by: British Lion
- Release date: 1948
- Country: UK
- Language: English

House of Darkness is a 1948 British film directed by Oswald Mitchell and starring Henry Oscar and Laurence Harvey. It was written by John Gilling based on the 1947 radio play Duet by Betty Davies. It marked the film debut of Laurence Harvey.

== Plot ==
A young man plans to get his hands on the family fortune.

== Cast ==
- Henry Oscar as film director
- Laurence Harvey as Francis (billed as Lawrence Harvey)
- Lesley Osmond as Elaine
- Alexander Archdale as John
- John Teed as Noel
- Grace Arnold as Tessa
- Pauline Winter as maid
- Charles Paton as solicitor's clerk
- John Stuart as Crabtree
- Sidney Monckton as Dr. Graham
- Lesley Brook as Lucy
- George Melachrino as conductor of orchestra

== Production ==
Harvey had been spotted by a talent scout while performing in Manchester Rep.

== Reception ==
The Monthly Film Bulletin wrote: "This film could have become boring in parts if it were not so well cast. Lawrence Harvey, as the embittered Francis, is outstanding, as also are Lesley Osmond, his forbearing wife in a difficult household, and Grace Arnold as Tessa, the devoted housekeeper. The haunting music of George Melachrino's First Rhapsody completes the eerie atmosphere of this film."

Kine Weekly wrote: "Unpretentious, yet holding, psychological melodrama, embellished with George Melachrino's melodies. ... Lawrence Harvey gives a most promising performance as megalomaniac Francis. Talented and self-confident, he should go far. ...The film, unfolded in one uninterrupted flashback, is quite a good romantic thriller, even though its abracadabra takes a bit of swallowing. Lawrence Harvey has a lot to learn, but in spite of his lack of experience his sense of the dramatic and his power to convey hysteria are more than capable of meeting the comparatively modest demands of its plush upholstered macabre."
