= Lucky Days (film) =

- Contemporary advertisement
- Directed by: Reginald Denham
- Written by: Margaret McDonnell; Gordon McDonnell
- Produced by: Anthony Havelock-Allan
- Starring: Chili Bouchier; Whitmore Humphries; Leslie Perrins
- Cinematography: Francis Carver
- Production company: British and Dominions
- Distributed by: Paramount British Pictures
- Release date: August 1935
- Running time: 67 minutes
- Country: United Kingdom
- Language: English

Lucky Days is a 1935 British comedy film directed by Reginald Denham and starring Chili Bouchier, Whitmore Humphries and Leslie Perrins. It was written by Margaret McDonnell and Gordon McDonnell, and made at British and Dominions Elstree Studios as a quota quickie.

== Preservation status ==
The British Film Institute National Archive holds a collection of ephemera and stills but no film or video materials.

== Plot ==
Patsy Cartwright takes financial advice from an astrologer, and plays the market. When her first investment fails, her husband Paul, a rather staid stockbroker, is annoyed. In order to recover her losses, Patsy secretly enlists the help of rival financier Jack Hurst, who has a reputation as a ladies' man. Her innocent relationship with Hurst leads to marital problems with Paul, but the story has a happy ending.

== Cast ==
- Chili Bouchier as Patsy Cartwright
- Whitmore Humphries as Paul Cartwright
- Leslie Perrins as Jack Hurst
- Ann Codrington as Eve Tandring
- Derek Gorst as Prosser
- Ronald Simpson as Smedley
- Eric Cowley as Eric
- Alexander Archdale as Alec
- Sally Gray as Alice
- Patricia Russell as Nora
- Eric Hales
- Deering Wells

== Reception ==
Kine Weekly wrote: "The theme of this unpretentious British drama is bright and original, but it is not exploited with the imagination and technical skill it deserves. However, in spite of its shortcomings it still finds in its shy flirtations with elementary finance and the foibles of the fair sex some popular entertainment. Feminine appeal is not lacking, the acting is sound, and the presentation is modern."

The Daily Film Renter wrote: "Good basic idea spoiled by weak treatment, with acting at best only competent. Dialogue along trite lines, but some humour in central theme and subordinate incident. Passable second feature, with possible woman interest."
