= John Philip Hogan =

American civil engineer (1861–1961)

- Born: December 6, 1881; Chicago, Illinois, U.S.
- Died: June 9, 1961 (aged 79); Santa Barbara, California, U.S.
- Resting place: Santa Barbara Cemetery
- Education: Harvard College (AB); Harvard University (SB)
- Spouse: Helen Scott Fargo (m. 1929)
- Engineering career
- Employers: Rapid Transit Commission (1904); Brooklyn Rapid Transit Company (1905); New York City Board of Water Supply (1906–1920); Parsons, Klapp, Brinckerhoff & Douglas (1923–1943); Parsons, Brinckerhoff, Hogan & MacDonald (1943–1947)
- Projects: Catskill Aqueduct; Bonneville Dam; 1939 New York World's Fair
- Military career
- Branch: United States Army
- Service years: 1917–1919
- Rank: Lieutenant colonel
- Unit: 11th Engineer Regiment
- Conflict: World War I
- Awards: Conspicuous Service Cross; Distinguished Service Medal; Legion of Honor of France; Purple Heart

John Philip Hogan (December 6, 1881 – June 9, 1961) was an American civil engineer and an expert in water supply and hydroelectric projects. He was employed by the New York City Board of Water Supply from 1906 until 1920—interrupted by two years of military service during World War I—where he worked on the construction of the Catskill Aqueduct and dams associated with the water supply system. Hogan joined Parsons, Klapp, Brinckerhoff & Douglas in 1923 and continued working at the firm until his retirement in 1947, serving on the consulting board for the design of the Bonneville Dam and as the chief engineer of the 1939 New York World's Fair. Hogan was president of the American Society of Civil Engineers in 1940.

== Early life and education ==
John Philip Hogan was born in Chicago, Illinois on December 6, 1881 to Denis John Hogan and Mary Agnes Hogan (née Duhig). His father was a lawyer.

Hogan was educated at the University School in Chicago and moved to Massachusetts to attend college from 1899 to 1904. Although he completed his coursework for a Bachelor of Arts (AB) degree at Harvard College in 1902, Hogan waited until the following year receive his degree with the rest of his class. He spent his last two years at college studying engineering at the Lawrence Scientific School of Harvard University, earning a Bachelor of Science (SB) degree in 1904.

== Career ==
In 1904, Hogan began working as an assistant engineer in New York City for the Rapid Transit Commission on the construction of the first Interborough Rapid Transit (IRT) subway. The following year, he became a resident engineer for the Brooklyn Rapid Transit Company (BRT) and was involved with extensions of elevated lines. Hogan moved to High Falls, New York in 1906, where began working for the New York City Board of Water Supply on the construction of the Catskill Aqueduct. He designed and supervised work on the water supply project until 1917, including 27 miles (43 km) of aqueduct and the dams that formed the Ashokan and Schoharie reservoirs.

Hogan attended a Plattsburgh camp and was commissioned as a captain in the Engineer Officers' Reserve Corps. He then served as the secretary of both the Military Engineering Committee of New York and the Engineers' Training Battalion. During World War I, Hogan served in the United States Army in France from 1917 to 1919, where he attained the rank of lieutenant colonel and became the deputy chief of Topographic Sections for the American Expeditionary Forces. He received the Conspicuous Service Cross from the New York State, the Distinguished Service Medal from the United States Army, the Order of the Purple Heart and was made a Chevalier of the Legion of Honor of France.

After completing his military service, Hogan resumed working at the Board of Water Supply, where shortly thereafter he was appointed as the acting deputy chief engineer. He continued working at the Board of Water Supply until 1920.

For the next three years, Hogan directed the New York Water Power Investigation, which was a study sponsored by utility companies of New York State that focused on the development of the Adirondack Region as a source of hydroelectric power and was managed out of the office of Parsons, Klapp, Brinckerhoff & Douglas. After the study concluded in 1923, Hogan began working at Parsons, Klapp, Brinckerhoff & Douglas. (Note: Hogan was very familiar with two partners of the firm. During the early part of his career, he had served as an assistant to Eugene Klapp on the construction of the first IRT subway and the extension of the BRT. During World War I, he served with Klapp and William Barclay Parsons.) He became a partner of the firm in 1926. (Note: The name of the firm was changed to Parsons, Brinckerhoff, Hogan & MacDonald in 1943. After Hogan's retirement in 1947, the name of the firm was changed to Parsons, Brinckerhoff, Hall & MacDonald.)

As an expert in water supply and hydroelectric projects, Hogan served as a consultant to numerous private utilities and government entities. Hogan helped to prepare a report for the United States Army Corps of Engineers that studied the potential of the Delaware River for hydroelectric power and water supply. (Note: The report was part of a nationwide study known as the "308 Report".) He was also hired by the Corps of Engineers as a consultant on the design of the Bonneville Dam on the Columbia River and played an important role in the development of innovations related to the dam's hydraulics and turbines.

In 1937, Hogan was appointed as chief engineer of the 1939 New York World's Fair. He was responsible for transforming the site of a former ash dump in Queens (now part of Flushing Meadows–Corona Park) into fairgrounds, with soil engineering and foundation testing, construction of new buildings, and the addition of transportation infrastructure (including new roads and a subway branch) capable of accommodating the arrival or departure of 168,000 attendees per hour.

Hogan received an honorary Doctor of Engineering degree at the commencement exercises of New York University in June 1940. After the destroyers-for-bases deal was made between the United States and the United Kingdom later that same year, Hogan designed air bases at Antigua, British Guiana, Trinidad, and Saint Lucia in the Caribbean as part of a joint partnership with the firm of Voorhees, Walker, Foley & Smith.

Hogan intended to retire in 1946 upon the recommendation of his doctor. However, he was appointed by New York City Mayor William O'Dwyer to a board tasked with selecting and developing a site for the headquarters of the United Nations (UN). Although Flushing Meadows was originally selected as the site for the UN headquarters (the former location of the 1939 World's Fair, which Hogan was very familiar with), the location was subsequently changed to the East Side of Manhattan. The new location required the widening of streets and the construction of new interchanges with the East River Drive, but the main challenge involved creating a tunnel to reroute First Avenue adjacent to the site of the UN. Hogan obtained an easement from the UN to reroute the utilities that had been located under the roadway, which allowed for cut-and-cover construction and resulted in a cost savings of $5 million. Hogan remarked, "What I entered into as a public duty developed into a large job with considerable prestige attached. There could be no thought of retirement until it was well under way." He finally retired in 1947.

== Professional societies ==
Hogan was elected as a junior member of the American Society of Civil Engineers (ASCE) in 1904. He became an associate member and a member of ASCE in 1912 and 1915, respectively. He later served as director (1921–1923), vice-president (1934–1935), and president (1940) of ASCE.

Hogan also was a member of the American Institute of Electrical Engineers, American Society of Mechanical Engineers, and the Society of American Military Engineers, serving as vice-president of the latter.

== Personal life and death ==
As a bachelor, Hogan was a roommate of fellow civil engineer J. Waldo Smith for several years. He married Helen Fargo (née Scott) on October 4, 1929 in New York City; she was the former wife of William C. Fargo.

Hogan enjoyed golf and travel as recreational activities. He was a member of the Century Club, Harvard Club, and Engineers' Club of New York City. For the last five years of his life, Hogan split his time between New York and Santa Barbara, California. He died in Santa Barbara on June 9, 1961 and was buried at Santa Barbara Cemetery.
