= The Ceremony (1963 film) =

1963 film by Laurence Harvey

- Theatrical release poster
- Directed by: Laurence Harvey
- Written by: Alun Falconer (Addl dial)
- Screenplay by: Ben Barzman
- Based on: La cérémonie 1951 novel by Frédéric Grendel
- Produced by: Laurence Harvey
- Starring: Laurence Harvey; Sarah Miles; Robert Walker Jr. John Ireland; Ross Martin; Lee Patterson; Jack MacGowran; Murray Melvin; Noel Purcell
- Cinematography: Oswald Morris
- Edited by: Ralph Kemplen
- Music by: Gerard Schurmann, Carlo Martelli
- Production company: Magla
- Distributed by: United Artists
- Release date: December 18, 1963
- Running time: 105 minutes
- Country: United States
- Language: English

The Ceremony is a 1963 American neo-noir crime film directed by Laurence Harvey and written by Ben Barzman. The film stars Laurence Harvey, Sarah Miles, Robert Walker Jr., John Ireland, Ross Martin, Lee Patterson, Jack MacGowran, Murray Melvin and Noel Purcell. The film was released on December 18, 1963, by United Artists.

== Plot ==
The story is set in Tangier when it was an internationally controlled territory separate from Morocco during the years leading towards Morocco regaining its independence. Sean (Harvey) is held in a castle prison awaiting execution after a bank guard has been killed during a robbery. The robbery may have political implications. Various administrative officials want Sean to say where the money is and the execution is politically important to show that the administration is upholding the law. Sean, an atheist, refuses to see a priest, Fr O’Brien. Outside Sean’s girlfriend, Catherine, is drawn into an escape plot and intimacy with Sean’s brother, Dominic. Catherine visits Sean and tells him to see a priest. Dominic arrives at the prison impersonating a priest and with the help of a guard they escape. Sean and Dominic are reunited with Catherine but they are traced by armed forces. Dominic gets to a car and leads the police away from the others as a decoy. He is chased until he is forced off the road and engulfed in his flaming car. Disfigured and thought to be Sean, he is brought back to prison for execution. Fr O’Brien finds Sean and reveals Dominic is awaiting execution telling Sean that his sacrifice is proof that God exists. Most of the firing squad are disgusted at the execution and fire into the sky but Dominic is executed just before Sean arrives. Sean lifts up his body and declares to the other prisoners that his brother has died to save him.

== Cast ==
- Laurence Harvey as Sean McKenna
- Sarah Miles as Catherine
- Robert Walker Jr. as Dominic McKenna
- John Ireland as Prison Warden
- Ross Martin as Lecoq
- Lee Patterson as Nicky
- Jack MacGowran as O'Brian
- Murray Melvin as First Gendarme
- Noel Purcell as Finigan
- Carlos Casaravilla as Ramades
- Fernando Rey as Sanchez
- Fernando Sancho as Shaoush
- José Nieto as Inspector

== See also ==
- List of American films of 1963
