= Santa Barbara Cemetery =

Nonsectarian cemetery in Santa Barbara, California

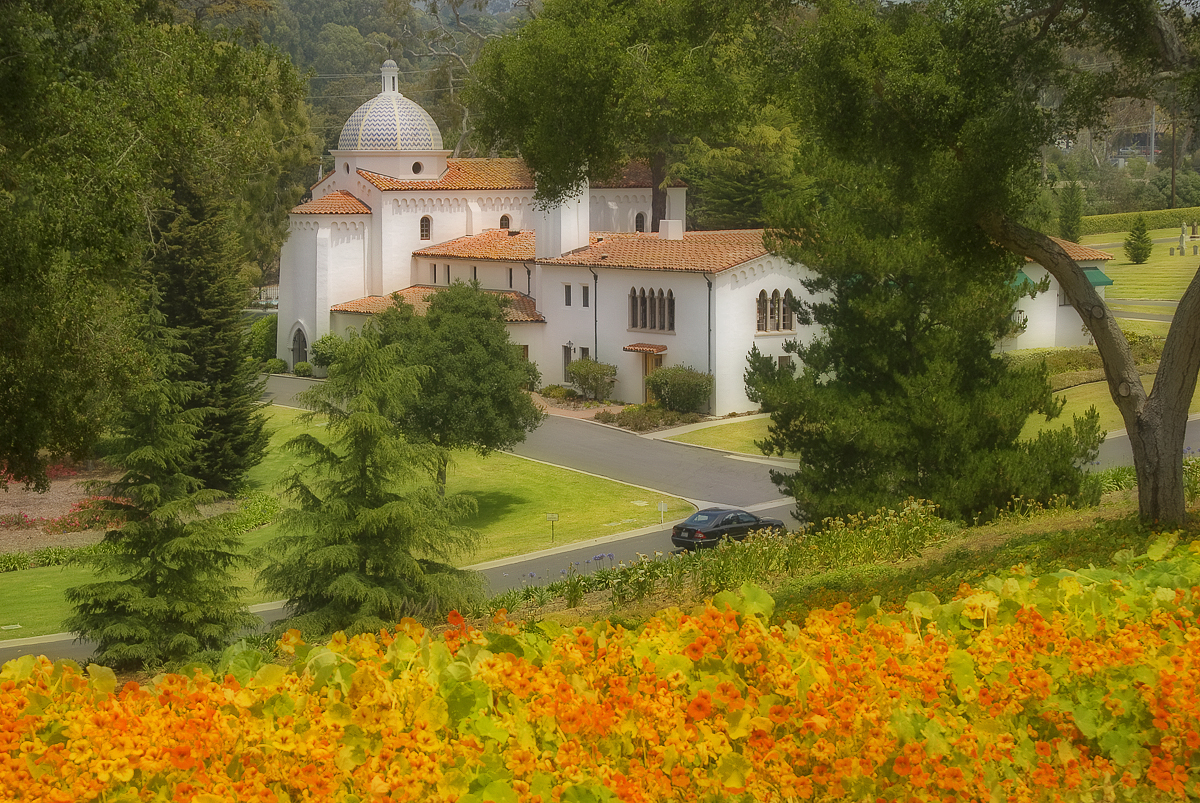
- Interactive map of Santa Barbara Cemetery

Details
- Established: July 10, 1867
- Location: Santa Barbara, California
- Country: United States
- Coordinates: 34.419°N 119.656°W
- Type: Nonsectarian
- Find a Grave: Santa Barbara Cemetery

Santa Barbara Cemetery is a cemetery located at 901 Channel Drive in Santa Barbara, California. Founded in 1867, it serves as a nonsectarian cemetery.

== Notable interments ==
- Heather Angel (1909–1986), actress
- Peter J. Barber (1830–1905), architect
- Christopher Bernau (1940–1989), actor
- Scott Cordelle Bone (1860–1936), politician
- Stephan W. Burns (1954–1990), actor
- Walter Capps (1934–1997), politician
- Sabin Carr (1904–1983), pole vaulter
- Curtis H. Castle (1848–1928), politician
- Virginia Cherrill (1908–1996), actress
- Eric Christmas (1916–2000), actor
- Ronald Colman (1891–1958), actor
- Jeanne Crain (1925–2003), actress
- Bradford Dillman (1930–2018), actor
- Leslie Fenton (1902–1978), actor and director
- Norman Gimbel (1927–2018), songwriter
- Al Gionfriddo (1922–2003), baseball player
- Pierpont M. Hamilton (1898–1982), U.S. Air Force general
- Haji (1946–2013), actress
- Domino Harvey (1969–2005), bounty hunter and model
- Laurence Harvey (1928–1973), actor
- Byron Haskin (1899–1984), director
- John Philip Hogan (1881–1961), civil engineer
- William Welles Hollister (1818–1886), rancher and entrepreneur
- Tab Hunter (1931–2018), actor
- John Ireland (1914–1992), actor
- Murray Kinnell (1889–1954), actor
- George Owen Knapp (1855–1945), industrialist and philanthropist
- William Lassiter (1867–1959), U.S. Army major general
- Walter F. Lineberger (1883–1943), politician
- Katherine MacDonald (1891–1956), silent-film actress and producer
- Eddie Mathews (1931–2001), baseball player
- John McLiam (1918–1994), actor
- Jerry Miley (1899–1979), actor
- Charles A. Ott Jr. (1920–2006) U.S. Army major general
- Fess Parker (1924–2010), actor
- Suzy Parker (1932–2003), model and actress
- Donald C. Peattie (1898–1964), scientist
- Herb Peterson (1919–2008), inventor
- Rebecca N. Porter (1883–1963), educator, author, journalist
- Vera Ralston (1923–2003), figure skater and actress
- Peggy Rea (1921–2011), actress
- Jheri Redding (1907–1998), hairdresser and chemist
- Ivan Reitman (1946–2022), film director
- Mark L. Requa (1866–1937), mining engineer and conservationist
- Kenneth Rexroth (1905–1982), poet
- Marguerite Roberts (1905–1989), screenwriter
- George Rowe (1894–1975), actor
- Eva Marie Saint (1924–2026), actress
- John Sanford (1904–2003), author and screenwriter
- Robert B. Sinclair (1905–1970), film and television director
- George Washington Smith (1876–1930), architect and painter
- Thomas M. Storke (1876–1971), politician
- Lynn Strait (1968–1998), singer
- Robert K. Straus, politician
- Alan Thicke (1947–2016), singer and actor
- Norma Varden (1898–1989), actress
- Haskell Wexler (1922–2015), filmmaker, cinematographer and documentarian
