= Harry Morton (restaurateur) =

American restaurateur (1981–2019)

- Born: Harry Aubrey Morton; April 7, 1981; Chatterton, Lancashire, England, UK
- Died: November 23, 2019 (aged 38); Beverly Hills, California, U.S.
- Occupation: Restaurateur
- Known for: Founder of Pink Taco
- Parent(s): Paulene Stone; Peter Morton
- Family: Arnie Morton (grandfather); Domino Harvey (half-sister); Michael Morton (uncle)

Harry Aubrey Morton (April 7, 1981 – November 23, 2019) was an American restaurateur and founder of the restaurant chain Pink Taco. Morton was a former owner of the nightclub The Viper Room.

Morton was the son of Peter Morton, co-founder of the restaurant chain Hard Rock Cafe, and the grandson of Arnie Morton, founder of the restaurant chain Morton's The Steakhouse. His mother was fashion model Paulene Stone and his maternal half-sister was bounty hunter Domino Harvey.

On November 23, 2019, Morton was found dead at his home in Beverly Hills, California. The cause of death was sudden cardiac arrest due to undiagnosed coronary artery disease.

Following his death, the company released a statement calling Morton "a visionary and restaurateur ahead of his time," and adding that "his contributions, both professionally to our brand and personally to those he worked with, were numerous."

Morton is eulogized in the post-credits scene of the 2021 film The King's Man, where he is called "a true gentleman who led by example, helped others and knew his duty."
