= Rebus (film) =

- Directed by: Nino Zanchin
- Written by: Sergio Donati; Matthew Marsh
- Produced by: Alberto Grimaldi
- Starring: Laurence Harvey; Ann-Margret
- Music by: Luis Bacalov
- Release date: 1969
- Running time: 80 minute
- Countries: Argentina; Italy; Spain; West Germany
- Language: English

Rebus or Appointment in Beirut is a 1969 crime film directed by Nino Zanchin and starring Laurence Harvey and Ann-Margret. An international co-production, it was largely filmed in Venezuela, the UK, Lebanon, Syria, and Italy.

== Cast ==
- Laurence Harvey as Jeff Miller
- Ann-Margret as Laura
- Andrea Bosic
- José Calvo as Benson
- Luis Dávila
- Alberto de Mendoza
- Ivan Desny as Guinness
- Lisa Halvorsen
- Jan Hendriks
- Camilla Horn as Evelyn Brown
- Luis Morris
- Milo Quesada
- Marcus Smith as Croupier

== Production ==
It was one of several films Ann-Margret made away from Hollywood around this time.
