= Pink Taco =

Mexican restaurant chain in Los Angeles, California

- Type: Private
- Industry: Casual dining restaurants
- Founded: 1999; 27 years ago
- Key people: Harry Morton (founder and CEO)
- Website: Pink Taco website

Pink Taco is a restaurant chain in the United States. It serves Mexican food.

== Locations ==
The first Pink Taco restaurant was opened in 1999 at the Hard Rock Hotel and Casino in Paradise, Nevada just off the Las Vegas Strip. A second location in Scottsdale, Arizona met with controversy and remained open for less than three years, between 2006 and 2009. A third location opened on June 28, 2007, in Century City, Los Angeles, California. In 2018, a location opened up in Chicago's Near North Side neighborhood.

== Name controversy ==
The name has caused controversy in Scottsdale, Arizona, where the restaurant attempted to open a second location. In response, the city government received four emails complaining about the name, "claiming it's a derogatory slang term for a portion of the female anatomy." This generated a complaint from Mayor Mary Manross who said she was offended, although she did not see the name in a sexual way until the complaints were raised. She asked the owner to change the name, but he refused.

On May 15, 2006, the Scottsdale City Council, by a unanimous vote, recommended the restaurant for a liquor license from the Arizona Department of Liquor Licenses and Control. One resident raised an objection at the meeting, saying the name "demeans and degrades women." The state agency said it had not received any complaints. The Scottsdale location closed on April 1, 2009.

The restaurant quickly gained the attention of the media, and was soon contacted by representatives from The Daily Show with Jon Stewart and Mind of Mencia with requests for interviews, which were initially turned down, however president and CEO Harry Morton appeared for an interview on the June 27, 2006, episode of The Daily Show, which also featured a story on the controversy by reporter Ed Helms. During his interview, Morton explained that the name comes from a menu item, and that if the restaurant were truly "vagina-themed", there would be "vaginas all over the walls".

In August 2006, Morton announced a $30 million bid for the naming rights to the Arizona Cardinals' new stadium in Glendale, Arizona. The offer was rejected by the Cardinals, who dismissed the announcement as a joke and a publicity stunt. On September 28, 2006, Pink Taco launched a similar bid to rename the Louisiana Superdome in New Orleans to the "Pink Taco Dome." As the State of Louisiana owns the Superdome, any name change must be approved by the Louisiana State Legislature.

== See also ==
- Hooters, another restaurant that has met with controversy for its name
