= Ritz Theater (Newburgh, New York) =

Coordinates: 41°29′59.25″N 74°0′40.94″W

The Ritz Theater is located in the city of Newburgh, New York. The theater is the last remaining historic theater in the city. The building is being restored by a local nonprofit organization.

== History ==
The original structure that would become the home of the Ritz Theater was constructed in 1883 at 107 Broadway in Newburgh, New York. “The address had been the site of other ventures that offered some of life’s small luxuries: George Barnes’ plumbing business ... a cigar factory ... and even a champagne factory.”

== 1900s ==
In 1913, the intended manufacturing building was purchased by George Cohen, “a Poughkeepsie entrepreneur,” and was named Cohen’s Opera House. The opera house opened on February 4, 1913. The opera house welcomed performers of all arts: jugglers, singers, dance troupes, theater companies, etc.

The East-West Theater Company became a part of the theater and changed the theater’s name from Cohen’s Opera House to the State Theater in 1926. The State Theater was a major participant in the vaudeville theatrical genre that was extremely popular at the time.

In 1933 Eugene Levy purchased the theater from George Cohen and “converted that playhouse of a gaudier era into an institution where cinematic and variety productions of the highest standard [were] presented with amazing skill, and affording the fascinated beholder the ultimate in comfort and convenience.” This would begin a new era for the Ritz Theater, which became a frequent stomping ground of many big name stars such as: Ella Fitzgerald, Louis Prima, Mary Martin, Peggy Lee, Wood Herman, Dick Powell, Bill “Bojangles” Robinson, Eddy Duchin, Red Skelton, Xavier Cugat, The Inkspots, Vaughn Monroe, Montana Slim, Les Brown, Ricardo Crotez, and many more.

On November 3, 1940, Frank Sinatra, an unknown singer at the time, stepped onto the Ritz Theater’s stage. The band of Tommy Dorsey backed Sinatra who captivated the Newburgh audience.

The Ritz Theater is most notably famous for being the stage where Lucille Ball made her stage debut. “On December 17th, 1941 she performed for the first time on stage and for the first time with her new husband, Desi Arnaz. It was on the Ritz stage that they planted the seeds for their sitcom, I Love Lucy.”

Shows were brought to the Ritz Theater by New York City’s Paramount Theater to test their acts on the Newburgh audience before opening in New York City.

Although the Ritz Theater continued to show movies, in the 1960s both the City of Newburgh and its once highly popular street of Broadway entered a slow decline that affected the theater as well as the city. The popular city of Newburgh was no longer as frequented as it once was as the ferry closed, and I-84 as well as the Newburgh-Beacon Bridge by-passed the downtown area of Newburgh.

In October 1969, the Ritz Theater was closed, and the theater became a movie house containing two cinemas. Cinemas one and two were carved into the house and the stage was closed and walled off from the rest of the structure. In 1981 both of the cinemas were shut down after “vandals damaged $15,000 worth of seating improvements inside the theater” and the owner of cinemas One and Two, Abram and Eva Levinson, “quit Newburgh ... quietly closing up shop.”

In February 1999, the movie theater was reopened by a former owner; however, the theater was quickly closed again for good in June of the same year due to lack of business. Throughout this span of seventeen weeks in business, the theater only had 700 customers.

== 2000s ==
In 2002, the Ritz Theater was purchased by Patricia Haggerty-Wenz, Founder and Executive Director of Safe Harbors of the Hudson, which is a “nonprofit organization that is committed to transforming lives and building communities through housing and the arts in the City of Newburgh.” The organization stumbled upon the theater in the process of restoring the adjacent former Hotel Newburgh, which is now the Cornerstone Residence, a supportive-housing facility.

This combination project, according to Haggerty-Wenz, is “the only one in the country that combines the restoration of a historic theater with a supportive housing project, all under one roof.”

With Haggerty-Wenz and Safe Harbors of the Hudson being the new owner of the establishment, the renovation of the Ritz Theater Lobby began. The renovation of the supportive housing project called the Cornerstone Residence adjacent to the theater occurred from 2004-2006.

The Cornerstone Residence consists of 128 apartments; 116 are supportive housing units and twelve are artist lofts. The apartments house a mixed tenancy of single adults, including formerly homeless, veterans, those living with a mental health diagnosis and/or physical disability, artists and other adults.

In 2008, Safe Harbors of the Hudson created a nonprofit organization called Ritz Theater-Newburgh, Inc. The mission of this particular nonprofit organization was to focus exclusively on the restoration of the Ritz Theater. It began hosting live performances in the newly restored lobby from musicians such as: Levi Kreiss, Pete Seeger and Odair Assad. The performances were part of the Tom Humphrey Guitar series.

In 2009, Ritz Theater-Newburgh, Inc. continued providing programming and performances in the restored lobby from artists such as: Bucky Pizzarelli, Arturo O’Farrill, The Michele Ramo Group, Jesse Lege, and many others. As well as providing performances in the lobby, the organization also focused on raising funds to restore the original theater to what it was. In July of the same year, Congressman Maurice Hinchey secured a federal appropriations bill which included “400,000 to begin renovating the Ritz Theater, the last remaining historic theater in Newburgh.”

In 2010, the Tom Humphrey Guitar Series continued to perform featuring artists such as: Larry Coryell, Maria Zemantauski and Duke Robillard. In October and November, Cindy Cashdollar and Frederic Hand performed and the second annual RitzKidz “Newburgh’s Got Talent” Talent Show was held. In February of the same year, the Ritz Theater secured 200,000 dollars in funding from the New York State Division of Housing and Community Renewal’s Urban Initiatives Program. This funding was directed towards the building of a box office.

== Future ==
The completion of the reconstruction of the Ritz Theater is scheduled for 2014. After the theater is finished, it will hold 825 people. There are a few nonprofit performing arts organizations who hope to make the newly renovated Ritz Theater their home; such as: “The Greater Newburgh Symphony Orchestra, the Opera Company of the Highlands and the Newburgh Performing Arts Academy” (Ritz Theater Tour).
