= George Skillan =

British actor (1893–1975)

- Born: 10 March 1893; Woodford, London, England
- Died: 23 March 1975 (aged 82); Stratford-on-Avon, Warwickshire, England
- Occupations: actor, writer, editor, scholar
- Years active: 65

William George Skillan (3 October 1893 – 23 March 1975) was a British stage, television and film actor, as well as a writer, editor, and scholar of the works of William Shakespeare.

Skillan had a significant acting career at the Royal Shakespeare Theatre with the Royal Shakespeare Company in the 1920s and 1940s, playing such roles as Othello, Macbeth, Claudius, and King Duncan. Other credited theatre productions include work at the Birmingham Repertory Theatre and Theatre Royal in Windsor.

Skillan's work as an editor, designer, and illustrator is credited on a number of Samuel French acting editions of Shakespeare plays, including Anthony and Cleopatra, As You Like It, and Twelfth Night. Skillan's work included annotations, stage design and illustration, stage direction, and suggestions regarding costumes and lighting.

== Selected filmography ==
Film

- The Merchant of Venice (1916)
- Dreyfus (1931)
- The First of the Few (1942)
- The Day Will Dawn (1942)

Television

- Cyrano de Bergerac 1938 broadcast of a shortened version of the play by Edmond Rostand - as Carbon de Castel-Jaloux, captain of the Gascon Guards.
- David Copperfield - as Mr. Wickfield (1956, 5 episodes)
- The Windmill Family - as Uncle Porteous (1956, 5 episodes)
- BBC Television World Theatre production of William Shakespeare's Henry V - as Sir Thomas Erpingham (1957)

Radio

- Pericles, Prince of Tyre - as Helicanus (1953)

== Selected bibliography ==
- William Shakespeare's The tragedy of Antony and Cleopatra (as Editor) (1970)
- William Shakespeare's Twelfth Night (as Volume Editor) (various)
