= Leontyne Butler King =

American businesswoman and clubwoman

- Leontyne Butler King, from a 1947 publication.
- Born: Leontyne Butler; July 4, 1905; New Orleans, Louisiana, US
- Died: January 23, 1976 (aged 70); Los Angeles, California, US
- Occupation(s): Businesswoman, clubwoman, library commissioner

Leontyne Butler King (July 4, 1905 – January 23, 1976) was an American businesswoman and clubwoman, based in Los Angeles, California after 1938. She was especially active as a member of the Los Angeles Public Library commission.

== Early life ==
Leontyne Butler was born in New Orleans, Louisiana. Her father worked on the railroad, and died young. Her stepfather Leon E. Brown also worked for the railroad. She attended Knoxville College. She moved to Chicago with her mother, Hattie Butler Brown, and her aunt, as a teenager.

== Career ==
=== Los Angeles Library Commission ===
Leontyne King was the first black member of the five-person Los Angeles Public Library Commission, serving from early 1961 into the mid-1970s. She was appointed to the commission seat previously held by Dolores Hope. She was elected vice-president of the commission in 1962, and was president of the commission in 1969. During her presidency, the library system's experimental "Service for Shut-Ins" book delivery service for elderly, disabled, and ill patrons continued, bilingual library aides were hired, and the libraries observed Negro History Week. Black artists and writers were invited to speak in the libraries, including painter Charles White. She spoke against paving green spaces in the city to build parking lots, even for library employees.

King represented the Los Angeles library system at the American Library Association (ALA) meetings in 1963 and 1964, and at the American Library Trustees Association (ALTA) in 1965 and 1973. At the 1963 ALA meeting, she "made an eloquent plea" in her address, asking the gathered librarians to provide patrons with "more books dealing with Negro History and Achievement". In 1966, she was national chair of Library Week for ALTA. She served on the ALTA board of directors, representing the western region, in 1969.

=== Fashion ===
In Chicago in the 1930s, King worked at a dress shop. She was later known as a fashionable clubwoman in Los Angeles. "Always chic Leontyne King is a statuesque brunette," noted Jet magazine when they included her in a 1952 feature on "America's Best Dressed Women", adding that she "stresses quiet elegance and simplicity of detail in her wardrobe and depends upon furs and expensive gems to lend greater richness to her ensembles." In 1954, she was commentator and director at fashion shows in Los Angeles.

=== Business, church, and politics ===
King also owned a jukebox franchise, with machines in black-owned businesses; her son took over that venture when he was in college. She was also a "family service adviser" at a funeral home. She was co-founder of the Church of Divine Guidance, a Baptist congregation in Los Angeles. In 1953 and 1954, King was head of the women's division of the Goodwin J. Knight for Governor Campaign committee.

== Personal life ==
Leontyne Butler married Celestus A. King Jr. in 1921. They had a son, Celestus King III, born 1923, who served in World War II and became a prominent businessman in Los Angeles. The Kings moved to Los Angeles in 1938. She died from cancer in 1976, aged 70, in Los Angeles. Her gravesite is in Inglewood Cemetery. A tribute to King was read into the Congressional record by Representative Yvonne Braithwaite Burke a week later.
