= Laurence Harvey =

Lithuanian-British actor (1928–1973)

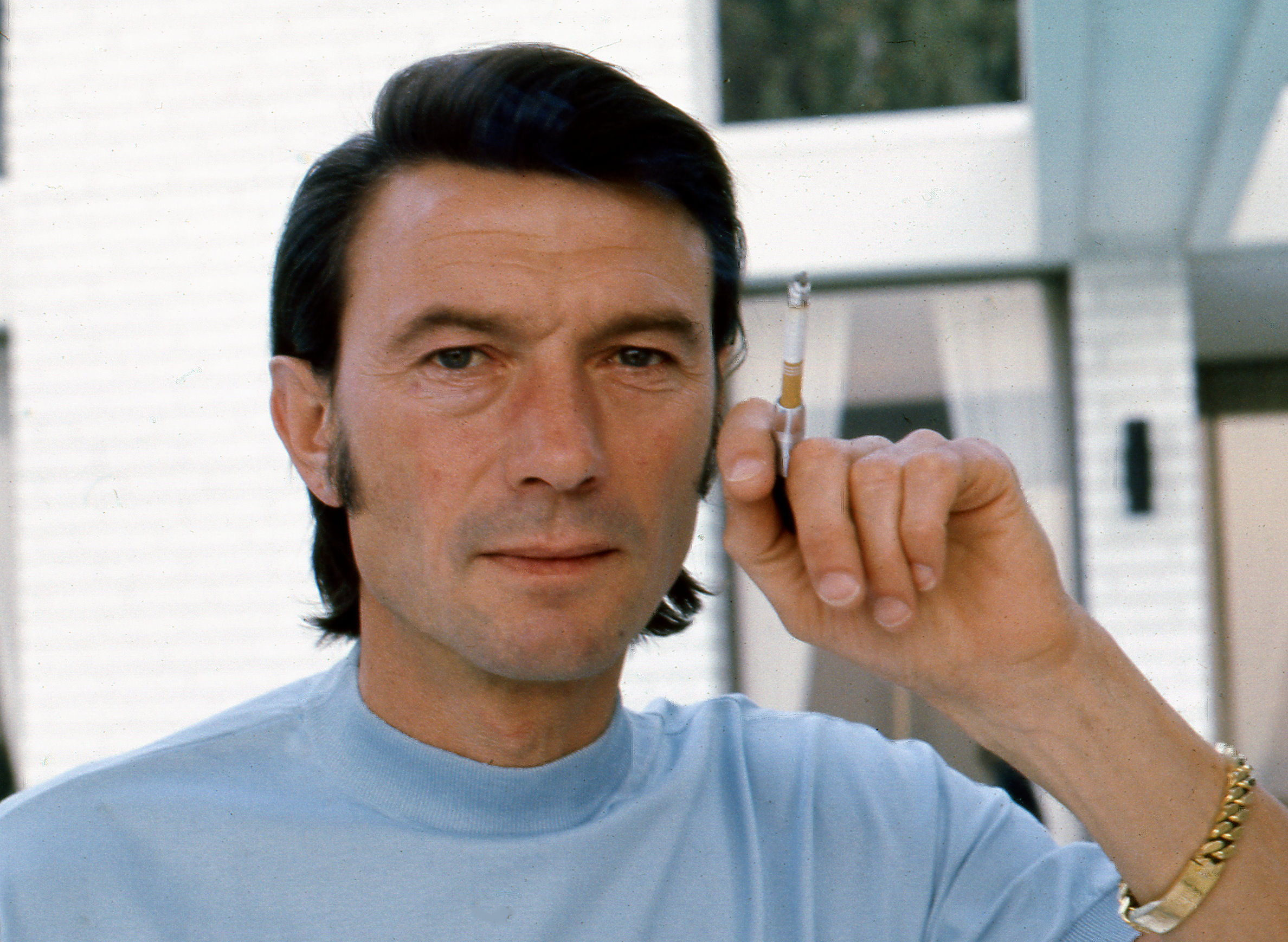
- Harvey in 1973, photograph by Allan Warren
- Born: Zvi Mosheh Skikne; 1 October 1928; Joniškis, Lithuania
- Died: 25 November 1973 (aged 45); Hampstead, London, England
- Resting place: Santa Barbara Cemetery, Santa Barbara, California, US
- Other names: Larushka Mischa Skikne; Zvi Mosheh Skikne; Hirsh Skikne; Larry Skikne
- Occupations: Actor; film director
- Years active: 1948–1973
- Spouses: Margaret Leighton (m. 1957; div. 1961) Joan Perry (m. 1968; div. 1972) Paulene Stone (m. 1972)
- Children: Domino Harvey

Laurence Harvey (born Zvi Mosheh Skikne; (Note: Yiddish: צבי משה סקיקנה) 1 October 1928 – 25 November 1973) was a Lithuanian-born British actor and film director. He was born to Lithuanian Jewish parents and immigrated to South Africa at an early age, before later settling in the United Kingdom after World War II. In a career that spanned a quarter of a century, Harvey appeared in stage, film and television productions primarily in the United Kingdom and the United States.

Harvey was known for his clipped, refined accent and cool, debonair screen persona. His performance in Room at the Top (1959) resulted in an Academy Award nomination for Best Actor. That success was followed by the roles of William Barret Travis in The Alamo and Weston Liggett in BUtterfield 8, both films released in the autumn of 1960. He also appeared as the brainwashed Sergeant Raymond Shaw in The Manchurian Candidate (1962). He made his directorial debut with The Ceremony (1963), and continued acting into the 1970s until his early death in 1973 of cancer.

== Early life and career ==
=== South Africa ===
Harvey was born in Joniškis, Lithuania, the youngest of three sons of Ella (née Zotnickaite) and Ber Skikne, Lithuanian Jewish parents. His civil birth name was Larushka Mischa Skikne, and his Hebrew name was Zvi Mosheh (Yiddish: צבי משה סקיקנה). When he was five years old, his family travelled with the family of Riva Segal and her two sons, Louis and Charles Segal on the SS Adolph Woermann to South Africa, where he was known as Harry Skikne. Harvey grew up in Johannesburg. He was only fifteen when he auditioned to join the Entertainment Unit of the South African Army during the Second World War. Sid James managed the Unit and approved his audition. They became lifelong friends. As the mystery guest on the American TV show What's My Line?, screened 1 May 1960, Harvey stated that he arrived in South Africa in 1934 and moved to the UK in 1946.

=== Move to Britain ===
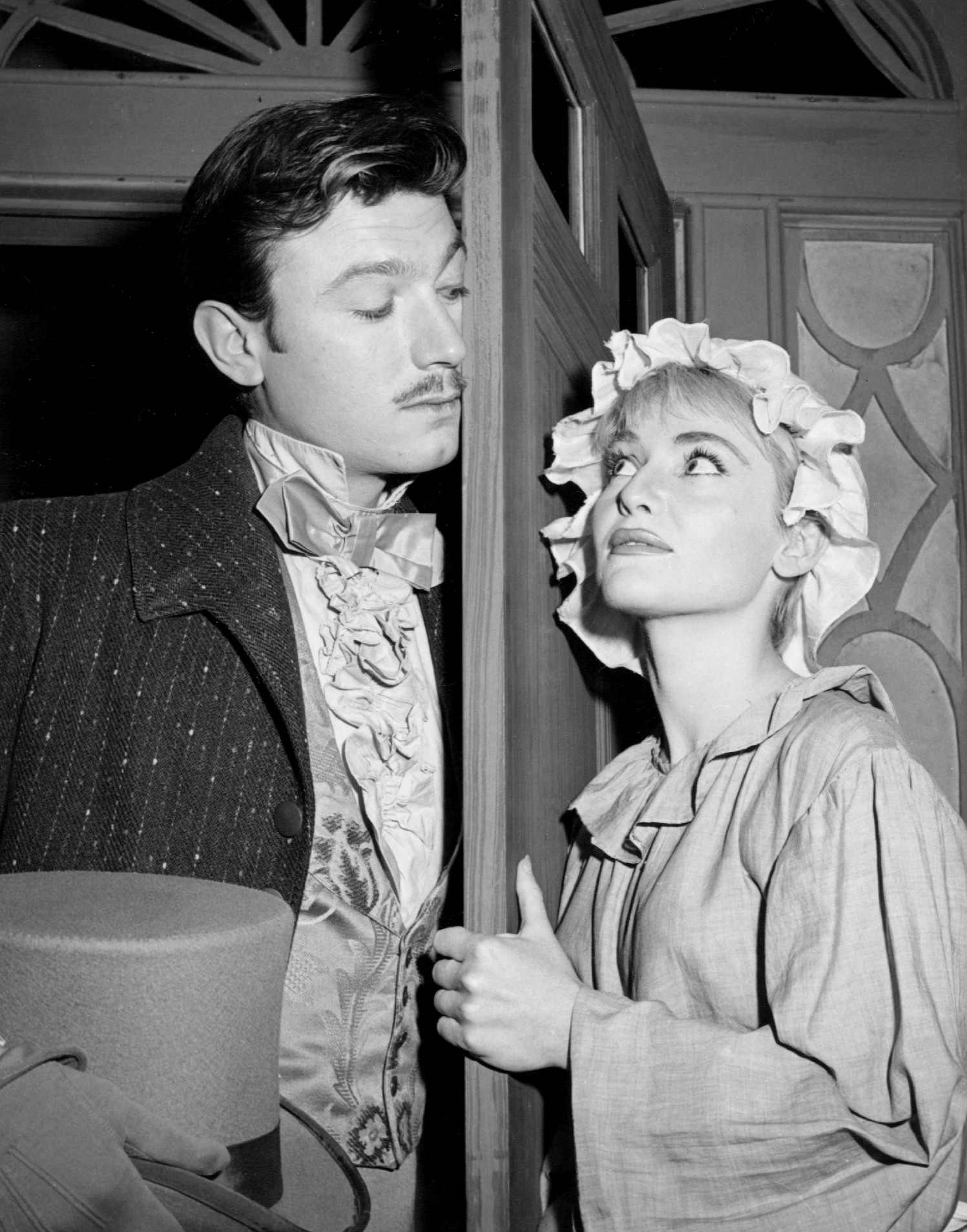
Harvey and Diane Cilento in the television play The Small Servant. Both made their U.S. television debuts in this production for The Alcoa Hour (1955).

After moving to London, he enrolled in the Royal Academy of Dramatic Art, but left RADA after three months.

Billed as Larry Skikne, he appeared in the play Uprooted at the Comedy Theatre in 1947. He also appeared on stage at the Library Theatre in Manchester. His performances in Manchester led to him being cast in his first film.

=== Film debut and new name ===
Harvey made his cinema debut in the British film House of Darkness (1948), but its distributor British Lion thought someone named Larry Skikne was not commercially viable. Accounts vary as to how the actor acquired his stage name of Laurence Harvey. One version has it that it was the idea of talent agent Gordon Harbord who decided Laurence would be an appropriate first name. In choosing a British-sounding last name, Harbord thought of two British retail institutions, Harvey Nichols and Harrods. Another is that Skikne was travelling on a London bus with Sid James who exclaimed during their journey: "It's either Laurence Nichols or Laurence Harvey." Harvey's own account differed over time.

=== Associated British Picture Corporation and leading man ===
Associated British Picture Corporation quickly offered him a two-year contract, which Harvey accepted. He appeared in supporting roles in several of their lower-budget films such as Man on the Run (1949), Landfall (1949) (directed by Ken Annakin) and The Dancing Years (1950). For International Motion Pictures he was in The Man from Yesterday (1949).

Mayflower Productions, which released through Associated British, gave Harvey his first lead, appearing alongside Eric Portman in the Egypt-set police film Cairo Road (1950). It was a minor success.

He had a small role in the Hollywood-financed The Black Rose (1950), starring Tyrone Power and Orson Welles, directed by Henry Hathaway. It was Harvey's first experience in a Hollywood film. He played Cassio in a version of Othello for BBC TV starring Andre Morell.

Harvey starred in leading roles for two B-pictures for director Lewis Gilbert at Nettleford Films: Scarlet Thread (1951) and There Is Another Sun (1951). For Ealing, he made I Believe in You (1952), directed by Basil Dearden. According to Sight and Sound this performance gave "an indication of Harvey's true metier. While Basil Dearden's direction focused on honest Harry Fowler, it was Harvey's Jordie who supplied an authentic glimpse of pin-table thuggery, his clothes and hairstyle on the cusp between cosh-boy and ted and his manner redolent of a languorous sexuality no amount of National Service could quell."

He starred in the low-budget thriller A Killer Walks (1952). In 1951 he appeared on stage in Hassan at the Cambridge Theatre.

== Romulus films ==
Harvey's career gained a boost when he appeared in Women of Twilight (1952); this was made by Romulus Films run by brothers John and James Woolf, who signed Harvey to a long-term contract. James Woolf in particular was a big admirer of Harvey and played an important role in turning the actor into a star.

In 1953 he played Orlando on a BBC TV version of As You Like It, opposite Margaret Leighton, whom he would later marry.

Romulus put him in two ensemble films: a comedy, Innocents in Paris (1953) and a crime thriller, The Good Die Young (1954). He had an especially strong role in the latter, which was directed by Lewis Gilbert, and featured Hollywood actors such as John Ireland, Richard Basehart and Gloria Grahame, along with Leighton. This has been called his "first performance of note."

Harvey received an offer to play the juvenile male lead in the Hollywood spectacular King Richard and the Crusaders (1954), a medieval swashbuckler for Warner Bros starring Rex Harrison, Virginia Mayo and George Sanders. It was a box-office disappointment, although Harvey's performance was well received.

Harvey played Romeo in Renato Castellani's adaptation of Shakespeare's Romeo and Juliet (1954), narrated by John Gielgud. His performance was generally not well received. According to a contemporary interview, he turned down an offer to appear in Helen of Troy (1955) to act at Stratford-upon-Avon, where he again performed in Romeo and Juliet, this time on stage.

Romulus gave Harvey another excellent chance when he was cast as the writer Christopher Isherwood in I Am A Camera (1955), with Julie Harris as Sally Bowles. He and Leighton starred in an adaptation of A Month in the Country for ITV Play of the Week (1955). He made his Broadway debut in 1955 in the play Island of Goats, a flop that closed after one week, though his performance won him a 1956 Theatre World Award. While in the US he appeared on TV in an episode of The Alcoa Hour called The Small Servant , co-starring Diane Cilento.

Zoltan Korda used him as one of the soldiers in Storm Over the Nile (1955), a remake of The Four Feathers (1939), playing the part taken by Ralph Richardson in the 1939 version. It was popular in Britain as was the comedy Three Men in a Boat (1956), made for Romulus under the direction of Ken Annakin.

Harvey appeared in The Bet for ITV Television Playhouse (1956) then did another for Romulus, After the Ball (1957), a biopic of Vesta Tilley, in which Harvey played Walter de Frece. He followed it with The Truth About Women (1958), a comedy directed by Muriel Box for Beaconsfield Productions.

Harvey returned to Broadway in 1957 to appear alongside Julie Harris, Pamela Brown and Colleen Dewhurst in William Wycherley's The Country Wife (a production he had originally starred in at London's Royal Court Theatre).

For Romulus, Harvey starred in The Silent Enemy (1958), with his old friend Sid James, a biopic of war hero Lionel Crabb.

== International stardom ==
=== Room at the Top ===
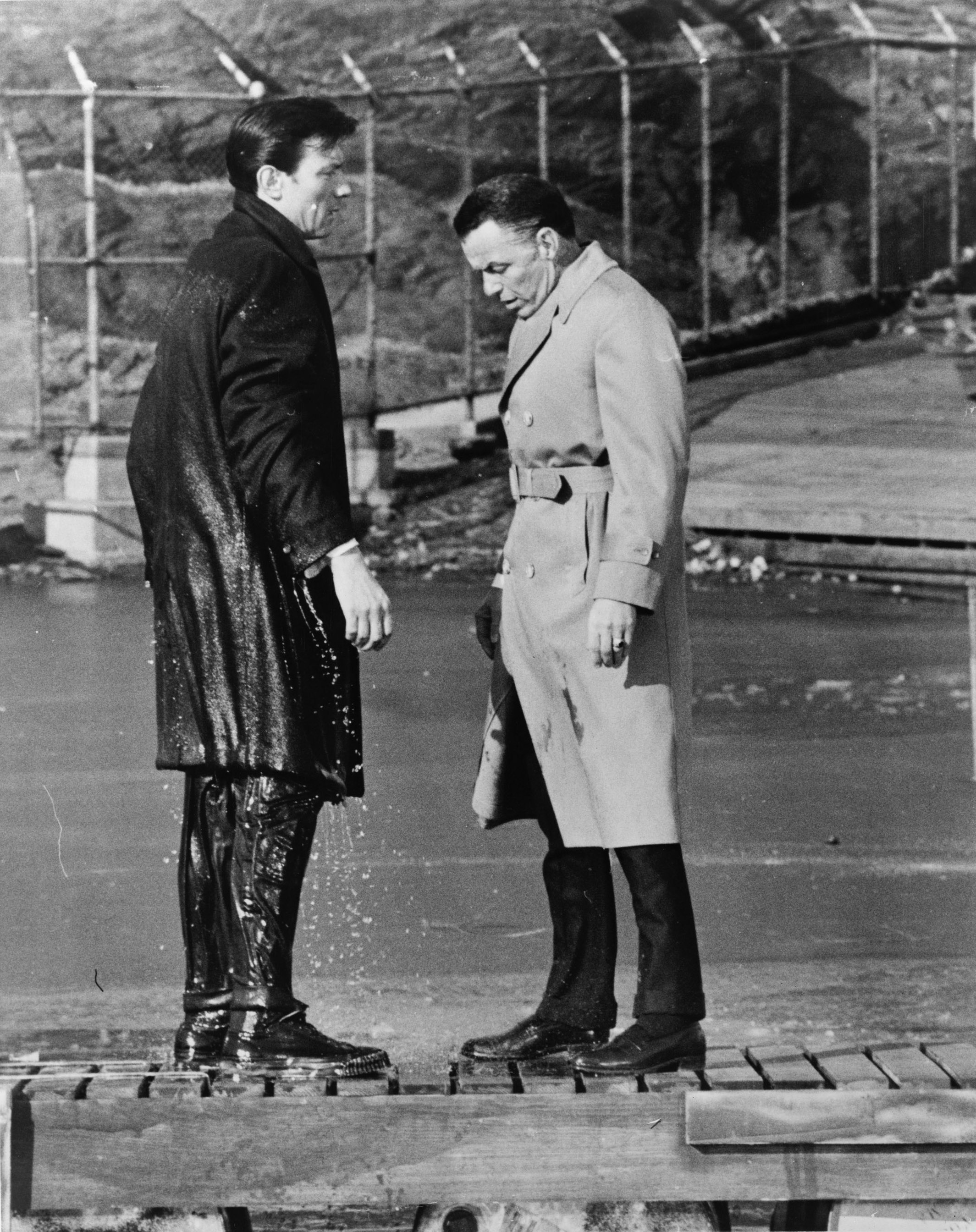
Harvey (left) with Frank Sinatra during the filming of The Manchurian Candidate

Harvey's breakthrough to international stardom came after he was cast by director Jack Clayton as the social climber Joe Lampton in Room at the Top (1959), produced by Romulus. For his performance, Harvey received a BAFTA Award nomination and a nomination for the Academy Award for Best Actor. Simone Signoret and Heather Sears co-starred as Lampton's married lover and eventual wife respectively. It was the third most popular movie at the British box office in 1959 and a hit in the U.S.

Harvey went to Broadway in 1958, as Shakespeare's Henry V, as part of the Old Vic company, which featured a young Judi Dench as Katherine, the daughter of the king of France.

Harvey followed it with the musical Expresso Bongo (1959), a film best remembered for introducing Cliff Richard. He did The Violent Years for the ITV Play of the Week (1959).

While in the US he appeared in "Arthur", an episode of Alfred Hitchcock Presents directed by Hitchcock himself.

=== Hollywood ===
The success of Room at the Top led to Hollywood offers and Harvey decided to spend the next three years focusing on films. He was in John Wayne's epic The Alamo (1960), being John Wayne's personal choice to play Alamo commandant William Barret Travis. Wayne had been impressed by Harvey's talent and ability to project the aristocratic demeanor Wayne believed Travis possessed. Harvey and Wayne later expressed their mutual admiration and satisfaction at having worked together. The Alamo was a hit.

Even more successful was Harvey's next Hollywood film, MGM's BUtterfield 8 (1960), which won Elizabeth Taylor her first Oscar. He was named for The Eddie Chapman Story but it was not made until years later, as Triple Cross with Christopher Plummer.

Back in Britain, Harvey was cast in the film version of The Long and the Short and the Tall (1961) in a role originally performed by Peter O'Toole during the play's West End run. He clashed with Richard Todd and Richard Harris during filming but the movie was a hit in Britain. He was announced for some films that were not made (The Disenchanted from the novel by Budd Schulberg, No Bail for the Judge from Alfred Hitchcock, The Lion, and The Long Walk).

In the U.S., he supported Shirley MacLaine in MGM's Two Loves (1961) and co-starred with Geraldine Page in the film adaptation of Tennessee Williams's Summer and Smoke (1961), directed by Peter Glenville. He signed to appear in the film of Five Finger Exercise but was not in the eventual film. His fee around this time was $300,000 a film.

Harvey played the male lead in Walk on the Wild Side (1962), produced by Charles Feldman, cast alongside Barbara Stanwyck, Jane Fonda and Capucine. Fonda was not positive about the experience of working with him: "There are actors and actors – and then there are the Laurence Harveys. With them, it's like acting by yourself."

The same year, he recorded an album of spoken excerpts from the book This Is My Beloved by Walter Benton, accompanied by original music by Herbie Mann. It was released on the Atlantic label. He narrated a TV musical, The Flood (1962).

MGM cast Harvey as Wilhelm Grimm in the MGM film The Wonderful World of the Brothers Grimm (1962), produced by George Pal. Harvey's performance earned him a nomination for the Golden Globe Award for Best Actor – Motion Picture Drama. The fantasy movie filmed in 3-strip Cinerama was a box office disappointment.

Harvey appeared as the brainwashed US Army Staff Sergeant Raymond Shaw in the Cold War thriller The Manchurian Candidate (1962), directed by John Frankenheimer and starring Frank Sinatra and Angela Lansbury. Film critic David Shipman wrote: "Harvey's role required him to act like a zombie and several critics cited it as his first convincing performance". The movie was a hit and has since become critically highly regarded, and is one of Harvey's better-remembered films.

Harvey went to Japan to make A Girl Named Tamiko (1962) with France Nuyen for director John Sturges and producer Hal Wallis. "I have suddenly found the gates of Hollywood opened to me," he said at the time.

He followed this with The Running Man (1963), directed by Carol Reed, with Lee Remick and Alan Bates.

=== Director ===
Harvey made his directorial debut with the crime drama The Ceremony (1963), in which he also starred. It was shot in Spain for United Artists.

Harvey played King Arthur in the 1964 London production of the Alan Jay Lerner and Frederick Loewe musical Camelot at the Theatre Royal, Drury Lane.

He was the male lead in an adaptation of W. Somerset Maugham's Of Human Bondage (1964), co starring Kim Novak. Harvey had been connected to the project for several years. It was a troubled shoot, with Harvey and Novak clashing, and original director Henry Hathaway leaving during the shoot and being replaced by Ken Hughes. During filming, kidnap threats were made against both Harvey and Novak by student organisations.

The Outrage (1964) was director Martin Ritt's remake of Akira Kurosawa's Japanese film Rashomon (1950). Besides Harvey, the film starred Paul Newman and Claire Bloom, but was unsuccessful critically and commercially.

Harvey reprised his role as Joe Lampton in Life at the Top (1965), directed by Ted Kotcheff. This is considered one of his best later performances.

He had his first commercially successful film in a number of years with Darling (1965), starring Julie Christie and Dirk Bogarde. While Harvey's role in the film is short, his involvement enabled director John Schlesinger to raise financial backing for the project. Harvey starred in a version of The Doctor and the Devils directed by Nicholas Ray from a script by Dylan Thomas but the film was not completed.

Harvey co-starred with Israeli actress Daliah Lavi in the comedy The Spy with a Cold Nose (1966), a parody of the James Bond films. Harvey did The Winter's Tale (1967) and then Dial M for Murder (1967) for American TV.

=== Charge of the Light Brigade ===
Harvey owned the rights to the book on which John Osborne's early script for the film The Charge of the Light Brigade (1968) was partially based, Cecil Woodham-Smith's book The Reason Why (1953). He intended to make his own version. A lawsuit was filed against director Tony Richardson's company Woodfall Film Productions on behalf of the book's author. There was a monetary settlement, and Harvey insisted on being cast in a cameo role (being cast as Prince Radziwill) as part of the agreement for which he was paid £60,000. Charles Wood was brought in to re-write the script. Harvey's scenes were cut from the movie at Richardson's insistence except for a brief glimpse as an anonymous member of a theatre audience which, technically, still met the requirements of the legal settlement. Osborne asserted in his autobiography that Richardson shot the scenes with Harvey "French", which is film jargon for a director "going through the motions" because of some obligation, but with no film in the camera.

Harvey completed direction of the spy thriller A Dandy in Aspic (1968) after director Anthony Mann died during production. The film co-stars Mia Farrow. This has been called "his last effective cinema role... The critics greeted it with disdain but the plot was tailor-made for Harvey, who plays a Russian spy who has adopted an English identity so he can go undercover within British Intelligence."

Harvey provided the narration for the Soviet film Tchaikovsky (1969), directed by Igor Talankin.

== Later career ==
Harvey co-starred with Ann-Margret in Rebus (1969) then appeared in The Last Roman (1968/69), a film set in Ancient Rome. The latter starred Orson Welles, who directed Harvey in The Deep, a thriller that was abandoned.

Harvey starred in She and He (1969), which he helped produce.

He had a cameo role as himself in The Magic Christian (1969), a film based on the Terry Southern novel of the same name. He gives a rendition of Hamlet's soliloquy that develops unexpectedly into a campy striptease routine.

He had a small role in WUSA (1970) and was guest murderer on Columbo: The Most Dangerous Match in 1973, portraying a chess champion who kills his opponent. For British TV he appeared in a version of Arms and the Man for ITV Sunday Night Theatre (1971). Joanna Pettet appeared with Harvey in an episode of Rod Serling's Night Gallery ("The Caterpillar", 1972), in which Harvey's character attempts to assassinate a romantic rival by having a burrowing insect dropped in the man's ear.

Harvey starred in Escape to the Sun (1972), directed by Menahem Golan and was reunited with Elizabeth Taylor in Night Watch (1973), financed by Brut Productions. The same company financed Welcome to Arrow Beach (1974), which Harvey directed and starred in; the cast also included his friend Pettet, John Ireland and Stuart Whitman. The film deals with a type of war-related post-traumatic stress disorder that turns a military veteran to cannibalism.

=== Final plans ===
In August 1973, it was reported Harvey had been ill, but he assured people he was busier than ever. Just before he died, he was planning to star in and direct two films: one on Kitty Genovese, the other a Wolf Mankowitz comedy titled Cockatrice. His death put an end to any hope that Orson Welles's The Deep would be completed. With Harvey and Jeanne Moreau in the leading roles, Welles worked on the film between his other projects, although the production was hampered by financial problems.

== Personal life ==
He met Hermione Baddeley, an established actress, when they were cast in the film There Is Another Sun in 1950. She became his live-in partner and a lucky charm for his career. She introduced him to Basil Dean and his first part on the London stage in Hassan, followed by a season at Stratford in 1952 with Glen Byam Shaw. Most significantly, she introduced him to James Woolf, of Romulus Films. Harvey left Baddeley in 1952 for actress Margaret Leighton, who was then married to publisher Max Reinhardt. Leighton and Reinhardt divorced in 1955, and she married Harvey in 1957 off the Rock of Gibraltar. The couple divorced in 1961.

In 1968 he married Joan Perry, the widow of film mogul Harry Cohn. Her marriage to Harvey lasted until 1972.

His third marriage was to British fashion model Paulene Stone. She gave birth to their daughter Domino in 1969 while he was still married to Perry. Harvey and Stone married in 1972 and soon after, he adopted her child from her previous marriage, Sophie Norris (now Sophie Harvey). The wedding took place at the home of Harold Robbins.

In his account of being Frank Sinatra's valet, Mr. S: My Life with Frank Sinatra (2003), George Jacobs writes that Harvey often made passes at him while visiting Sinatra. According to Jacobs, Sinatra was aware of Harvey's sexuality. In his autobiography Close Up (2004), British actor John Fraser claimed Harvey was gay and that his long-term lover was Harvey's manager James Woolf, who had cast Harvey in several of the films he produced in the 1950s.

After working in two films with her, Harvey remained friends with Elizabeth Taylor for the rest of his life. She visited him three weeks before he died. Upon his death, Taylor issued the statement: "He was one of the people I really loved in this world. He was part of the sun. For everyone who loved him, the sun is a bit dimmer." She and Peter Lawford held a memorial service for Harvey in California.

Harvey once responded to an assertion about himself: "Someone once asked me, 'Why is it so many people hate you?' and I said, 'Do they? How super! I'm really quite pleased about it.' "

== Death ==
A heavy smoker and drinker, Harvey died at the age of 45 from stomach cancer in Hampstead, north London, on 25 November 1973.

His daughter Domino Harvey was only four years old at the time. She moved to the United States with her mother where she later became a bounty hunter. She died in 2005 at the age of 35 after overdosing on fentanyl. She and her father are buried alongside one another in Santa Barbara Cemetery in California.

== Appraisal ==
According to his obituary in The New York Times:

With his clipped speech, cool smile and a cigarette dangling impudently from his lips, Laurence Harvey established himself as the screen's perfect pin-striped cad. He could project such utter boredom that willowy debutantes would shrivel in his presence. He could also exude such charm that the same young ladies would gladly lend him their hearts, which were usually returned utterly broken ... The image Mr Harvey carefully fostered for himself off screen was not far removed from some of the roles he played. "I'm a flamboyant character, an extrovert who doesn't want to reveal his feelings", he once said. "To bare your soul to the world, I find unutterably boring. I think part of our profession is to have a quixotic personality."

According to Sight and Sound, "Any young actor who delighted in pink bathroom suites and liked to compare himself favourably to Olivier, Gielgud and Richardson – preferably in the same sentence – was clearly going to find it hard to fit the mould of New Elizabethan chappism promoted by Rank and ABPC ... Harvey flaunted a cigarette holder almost as a parody of Terry Thomas' and boasted that his drainpipe trousers pre-dated the teddy boys'. His hairstyle always tended towards the baroque and quickly became a trademark."

== Theatre credits (partial) ==
| Year | Title | Role | Theater | Notes | Refs. |
|---|---|---|---|---|---|
| 1946 | The Winter's Tale | Camillo | Royal Academy of Dramatic Art | as 'Larry Skikne' | |
| 1947 | The Seagull | | Manchester Intimate Theatre | as 'Larry Skikne' | |
| 1947 | Amphitryon | | Manchester Intimate Theatre | as 'Larry Skikne' | |
| 1947 | The Kirby Fortune | | Manchester Intimate Theatre | as 'Larry Skikne' | |
| 1947 | The Beaux' Stratagem | | Manchester Intimate Theatre | as 'Larry Skikne' | |
| 1947 | The Circle | | Manchester Intimate Theatre | as 'Larry Skikne' | |
| 1947 | Uprooted | Nicky Horroway | Comedy Theatre | as 'Larry Skikne' | |
| 1951 | Hassan | | Cambridge Theatre, London | | |
| 1951-52 | As You Like It | | Royal Shakespeare Theatre, Stratford-upon-Avon | | |
| 1952 | Coriolanus | Tullus Aufidius | Royal Shakespeare Theatre, Stratford-upon-Avon | | |
| 1952 | As You Like It | Orlando | Royal Shakespeare Theatre, Stratford-upon-Avon | | |
| 1952 | Macbeth | Malcolm | Royal Shakespeare Theatre, Stratford-upon-Avon | | |
| 1952 | Volpone | Castrone | Royal Shakespeare Theatre, Stratford-upon-Avon | | |
| 1952-53 | Macbeth | | Royal Shakespeare Theatre, Stratford-upon-Avon | | |
| 1954 | Romeo and Juliet | Romeo | Royal Shakespeare Theatre, Stratford-upon-Avon | | |
| 1954 | Troilus and Cressida | Troilus | Royal Shakespeare Theatre, Stratford-upon-Avon | | |
| 1955 | Island of Goats | Angelo | Fulton Theatre, New York | Theatre World Award | |
| 1956 | The Rivals | Captain Jack Absolute | Saville Theatre, London | | |
| 1956 | The Rivals | Captain Jack Absolute | Royal Lyceum Theatre, Edinburgh | | |
| 1956 | The Country Wife | Mr. Horner | Royal Court Theatre, London | | |
| 1957 | The Country Wife | Mr. Horner | Adelphi Theatre, New York | | |
| 1957-58 | The Country Wife | Mr. Horner | Henry Miller's Theatre, New York | | |
| 1958 | Simply Heavenly | | UK tour | Director/presenter | |
| 1958-59 | Henry V | King Henry V | US tour | | |
| 1958-59 | Henry V | King Henry V | Broadway Theatre, New York | | |
| 1964-65 | Camelot | King Arthur | Theatre Royal, Drury Lane | | |
| 1966 | The Winter's Tale | Leontes | Edinburgh Festival Fringe | | |
| 1966 | The Winter's Tale | Leontes | UK tour | | |
| 1970 | Arms and the Man | Major Sergius Saranoff | Chichester Festival Theatre | | |
| 1971 | Child's Play | Jerome Malley | Theatre Royal, Brighton | | |
| 1971 | Child's Play | Jerome Malley | Queen's Theatre | | |

== Filmography ==
Note: Where British Film Institute (BFI) and American Film Institute (AFI) differed on release year, or if the Wikipedia article title had a different release year, whichever source is the country of production is the year used.

=== Film ===
| Year | Title | Role | Director | Notes | Refs. |
|---|---|---|---|---|---|
| 1948 | House of Darkness | Francis Merryman | Oswald Mitchell | | |
| 1949 | Man on the Run | Detective Sergeant Lawson | Lawrence Huntington | | |
| 1949 | The Man from Yesterday | John Matthews | Oswald Mitchell | | |
| 1949 | Landfall | P/O Hooper | Ken Annakin | | |
| 1950 | Cairo Road | Lieutenant Mourad | David MacDonald | | |
| 1950 | The Dancing Years | Bit part | Harold French | Uncredited | |
| 1950 | The Black Rose | Edmond | Henry Hathaway | | |
| 1950 | Seven Days to Noon | Soldier | John and Roy Boulting | Uncredited | |
| 1951 | Scarlet Thread | Freddie | Lewis Gilbert | | |
| 1951 | There Is Another Sun | Mag Maguire | Lewis Gilbert | | |
| 1952 | I Believe in You | Jordie Bennett | Michael Relph | | |
| 1952 | A Killer Walks | Ned | Ronald Drake | | |
| 1952 | Women of Twilight | Jerry Nolan | Gordon Parry | | |
| 1953 | Innocents in Paris | François | Gordon Parry | Uncredited | |
| 1954 | The Good Die Young | Miles Ravenscourt | Lewis Gilbert | | |
| 1954 | King Richard and the Crusaders | Sir Kenneth of Huntington | David Butler | | |
| 1954 | Romeo and Juliet | Romeo | Renato Castellani | | |
| 1955 | I Am a Camera | Christopher Isherwood | Henry Cornelius | | |
| 1955 | Storm Over the Nile | John Durrance | Terence Young | | |
| 1956 | Three Men in a Boat | George | Ken Annakin | | |
| 1957 | After the Ball | Walter de Frece | Compton Bennett | | |
| 1957 | The Truth About Women | Sir Humphrey Tavistock | Muriel Box | | |
| 1958 | The Silent Enemy | Lieutenant Crabb | William Fairchild | | |
| 1959 | Room at the Top | Joe Lampton | Jack Clayton | Nominated- Academy Award for Best Actor; Nominated- BAFTA Award for Best British Actor; Nominated- New York Film Critics Circle Award for Best Actor | |
| 1959 | Power Among Men | Narrator (voice) | Alexander Hackenschmied | Documentary | |
| 1959 | Expresso Bongo | Johnny Jackson | Val Guest | Nominated- BAFTA Award for Best British Actor | |
| 1960 | The Alamo | William Barret Travis | John Wayne | | |
| 1960 | BUtterfield 8 | Weston Ligget | Daniel Mann | | |
| 1961 | The Long and the Short and the Tall | Private 'Bammo' Bamforth | Leslie Norman | | |
| 1961 | Two Loves | Paul Lathrope | Charles Walters | | |
| 1961 | Summer and Smoke | John Buchanan Jr. | Peter Glenville | | |
| 1962 | Walk on the Wild Side | Dove Linkhorn | Edward Dmytryk | | |
| 1962 | The Wonderful World of the Brothers Grimm | Wilhelm Grimm / The Cobbler | Henry Levin | Nominated- Golden Globe Award for Best Actor in a Motion Picture – Drama | |
| 1962 | The Manchurian Candidate | Raymond Shaw | John Frankenheimer | | |
| 1962 | A Girl Named Tamiko | Ivan Kalin | John Sturges | | |
| 1963 | The Running Man | Rex Black | Carol Reed | | |
| 1963 | The Ceremony | Sean McKenna | Himself | Also director | |
| 1964 | Of Human Bondage | Phillip Carey | Ken Hughes | | |
| 1964 | The Outrage | Husband | Martin Ritt | | |
| 1965 | Darling | Miles Brand | John Schlesinger | | |
| 1965 | Life at the Top | Joe Lampton | Ted Kotcheff | | |
| 1966 | The Spy with a Cold Nose | Dr. Francis Trevelyan | Daniel Petrie | | |
| 1967 | The Winter's Tale | King Leontes | Frank Dunlop | | |
| 1968 | A Dandy in Aspic | Eberlin | Anthony Mann; Himself | Took over directing after Mann's death without credit | |
| 1968 | The Charge of the Light Brigade | Russian Prince | Tony Richardson | Uncredited cameo | |
| 1968 | The Last Roman | Cethegus | Robert Siodmak | | |
| 1969 | Rebus | Jeff Miller | Nino Zanchin | | |
| 1969 | L'assoluto naturale | "He" | Mauro Bolognini | Also uncredited producer | |
| 1969 | The Magic Christian | Hamlet | Joseph McGrath | | |
| 1970 | WUSA | Farley | Stuart Rosenberg | | |
| 1970 | Tchaikovsky | Narrator | Igor Talankin | | |
| 1970 | The Deep | Hughie Warriner | Orson Welles | | |
| 1972 | Escape to the Sun | Major Kirsanov | Menahem Golan | | |
| 1973 | Night Watch | John Wheeler | Brian G. Hutton | | |
| 1973 | F for Fake | Himself | Orson Welles | | |
| 1974 | Welcome to Arrow Beach | Jason Henry | Himself | Also director, posthumous release | |

=== Television ===
| Year | Title | Role | Notes | Refs. |
|---|---|---|---|---|
| 1950 | Othello | Cassio | (BBC TV) | |
| 1953 | As You Like It | Orlando | (BBC TV) | |
| 1955 | ITV Play of the Week | Beljajew | A Month in the Country | |
| 1955 | The Alcoa Hour | Dick Swiveller | The Small Servant | |
| 1956 | The Bet | | | |
| 1957 | Holiday Night Reunion | | | |
| 1959 | Alfred Hitchcock Presents | Arthur Williams | Season 5 Episode 1: Arthur | |
| 1959 | ITV Play of the Week | Chris/Misha | The Violent Years | |
| 1960 | Pontiac Star Parade | Self | The Spirit of the Alamo, wrap party in Brackettville, Texas | |
| 1960 | What's My Line? | Self | Guest panelist 6 March; mystery guest 1 May | |
| 1960 | Here's Hollywood | Self | Episode 1.19 | |
| 1962 | The Milton Berle Show | Self | 9 March episode | |
| 1962 | The Flood (Stravinsky) | Narrator | | |
| 1964 | Password | Self | Georgia Brown v. Laurence Harvey | |
| 1964 | The Ed Sullivan Show | Self | Episode 18.5 | |
| 1964 | The Eamonn Andrews Show | Self | Episode 1.2 | |
| 1965 | The Eamonn Andrews Show | Self | Episode 2.15 | |
| 1965 | The Danny Kaye Show | Self | Episode 3.14 | |
| 1966 | Hollywood Talent Scouts | Self | 31 January episode | |
| 1966 | Late Night Line-Up | Self | 5 February episode, BBC | |
| 1967 | The Merv Griffin Show | Self | 27 April episode | |
| 1967 | Dial M for Murder | Tony Wendice | TV movie | |
| 1967 | The Jerry Lewis Show | Self | 17 October 1967 episode | |
| 1968 | The Joey Bishop Show | Self | Episodes 2.245 and 3.40 | |
| 1968 | Marvelous Party! | Host | A 70th birthday tribute to Noël Coward | |
| 1969 | Rowan and Martin's Laugh-In | Self | Episode 2.25 | |
| 1969 | Joker's Wild | Self | American TV game show | |
| 1970 | The David Frost Show | Self | Episode 2.184 | |
| 1971 | ITV Saturday Night Theatre | Major Sergius Saranoff | Arms and the Man | |
| 1971 | The Dick Cavett Show | Self | 11 May episode | |
| 1971 | The Tonight Show Starring Johnny Carson | Self | 19 November episode | |
| 1971 | Celebrity Bowling | Self | Unknown episode | |
| 1972 | Night Gallery | Steven Macy | Episode: "Caterpillar" | |
| 1973 | Columbo | Emmett Clayton | Episode: "The Most Dangerous Match" | |
| 1973 | 45th Academy Awards | Self (presenter) | Special | |
| 1973 | The Tonight Show Starring Johnny Carson | Self (guest) | Episode dated 8/24/73 | |

== Awards and nominations ==
| Award | Date | Category | Nominated work | Result | Refs. |
|---|---|---|---|---|---|
| Academy Awards | 4 April 1960 | Best Actor | Room at the Top | Nominated | |
| British Academy Film Awards | 1959 | Best British Actor | Room at the Top | Nominated | |
| British Academy Film Awards | 1960 | Best British Actor | Expresso Bongo | Nominated | |
| Golden Globe Awards | 5 March 1963 | Best Actor – Motion Picture Drama | The Wonderful World of the Brothers Grimm | Nominated | |
| Golden Globe Awards | 12 February 1968 | World Film Favorite - Male | —N/a | Won | |
| Golden Laurel Awards | 1960 | Top Male New Personality | —N/a | 4th place | |
| New York Film Critics Circle Awards | 1959 | Best Actor | Room at the Top | Nominated | |
| Theatre World Award | 1956 | —N/a | Island of Goats | Won | |
| Western Heritage Awards | 1961 | Theatrical Motion Picture | The Alamo | Won | |

== Notes ==
=== References ===
- Kennedy, Dennis (2002). Looking at Shakespeare A Visual History of Twentieth-Century Performance. Cambridge University Press. ISBN 978-0-521-78548-8.
- Mullin, Michael; Gielgud, John (1996). Design by Motley. University of Delaware Press. ISBN 978-0-87413-569-5.
- Wearing, J. P. (2014). The London Stage 1940–1949: A Calendar of Productions, Performers, and Personnel. Rowman & Littlefield Publishers. ISBN 978-0-8108-9305-4.
- Wright, Adrian (2012). West End Broadway: The Golden Age of the American Musical in London. Boydell Press. ISBN 978-1-84383-791-6.
