= Brian G. Hutton =

American film director and actor (1935–2014)

- Born: Brian Geoffrey Hutton; May 2, 1935; New York City, New York, U.S.
- Died: August 19, 2014 (aged 79); Los Angeles, California, U.S.
- Education: Actors Studio
- Occupations: Film director, actor
- Years active: 1954–83

Brian Geoffrey Hutton (May 2, 1935 – August 19, 2014) was an American film director and actor. As a filmmaker, he was best known for directing the World War II action films Where Eagles Dare (1968) and Kelly's Heroes (1970).

== Early life and acting career ==
Hutton was born in New York City, and studied at the Actors Studio. He was discovered by film producer Hal B. Wallis, who first brought him to Hollywood in the mid-1950s.

He had a brief acting career between 1954 and 1962, including an appearance as an army deserter in the episode "Custer" in Gunsmoke (series 2, 1956). He played a young gunslinger, Billy Benson in season 2, episode 4 of The Rifleman. He made two guest appearances on Perry Mason in 1957: as Rod Gleason in "The Case of the Sulky Girl" and as a parking attendant in "The Case of the Moth-Eaten Mink." His last television appearance was in the series Archer in 1975.

In 1958, Hutton played a young gunfighter named The Kid in the episode "Yampa Crossing" of the western series Sugarfoot. The following year, he portrayed a remorseful defendant on trial for causing a traffic death in Alfred Hitchcock Presents (the episode "Your Witness"). Hutton played twins in an episode of Have Gun Will Travel as Adam and Sam M.

Hutton also taught acting at the Beverly Hills Playhouse, where he staged a production of The Connection that starred Robert Blake and was produced by Albert S. Ruddy.

== Director ==
Hutton made his debut as a director in 1965 with Wild Seed, a low-budget drama starring Michael Parks and Celia Kaye. His first studio film was The Pad and How to Use It (1966), produced by Ross Hunter, shot in 19 days.

Hutton then did Sol Madrid (1967) for producer Elliot Kastner. Kastner hired Hutton to direct Where Eagles Dare, from a screenplay by Alistair MacLean at MGM starring Richard Burton and Clint Eastwood. It was a huge success.

MGM hired Hutton to direct Clint Eastwood again in Kelly's Heroes.

He then directed Elizabeth Taylor in X Y & Zee (1972) and Night Watch (1973). He was going to do Sleep is for the Rich for Kastner but it was never made. In November 1972, Martin Poll announced Hutton would direct The Man Who Loved Cat Dancing; the film ended up being directed by Richard C. Sarafian..

=== Retirement ===
After Night Watch came out in 1973, Hutton stopped making films for seven years because he lost his enthusiasm for it:

"It wasn’t something I wanted to do to begin with – not my life’s work... When I finished the second Elizabeth Taylor picture I thought, ‘Well, what am I wasting my life doing this for?' I mean, a gorilla could have made those movies. All I had to do was yell ‘Action’ and ‘Cut-Print’ because everybody was doing what they had to do anyway."

— Brian G. Hutton

=== Temporary return to filmmaking ===
He came back at the behest of Elliot Kastner who needed a director to replace Roman Polanski on The First Deadly Sin (1980) with Frank Sinatra. Hutton then made High Road to China (1983), this time replacing Sidney J. Furie, with Tom Selleck.

Hutton retired from making films altogether 1980s by the end of the decade, and worked in real-estate.

== Death ==
He died in Los Angeles, California on August 19, 2014, at age 79, a week after suffering a heart attack. He was survived by his wife Victoria.

== Appraisal ==
Erin Free of FilmInk included Hutton in the publication's "Unsung Auteur" series, writing "Though not as driven to the task as most successful directors, Brian G. Hutton nevertheless helmed a number of excellent features, most notably a truly cracking Clint Eastwood double-shot with 1968’s Where Eagles Dare and 1970’s Kelly’s Heroes (....) Hutton imbued his films with something a little extra in terms of attitude and originality."

== Filmography ==
=== Director ===
Year	Title	Starring cast	Studio/Distributor
1965	Wild Seed	Michael Parks, Celia Kaye	Universal Pictures
1966	The Pad and How to Use It	Brian Bedford, Julie Sommars, James Farentino	Universal Pictures
1968	Sol Madrid	David McCallum, Stella Stevens, Telly Savalas	Metro-Goldwyn-Mayer
1968	Where Eagles Dare	Richard Burton, Clint Eastwood, Mary Ure	Metro-Goldwyn-Mayer
1970	Kelly's Heroes	Clint Eastwood, Telly Savalas, Don Rickles	Metro-Goldwyn-Mayer
1972	X Y & Zee	Elizabeth Taylor, Michael Caine, Susannah York	Columbia Pictures
1973	Night Watch	Elizabeth Taylor, Laurence Harvey, Billie Whitelaw	Avco Embassy Pictures
1980	The First Deadly Sin	Frank Sinatra, Faye Dunaway, James Whitmore	Filmways Pictures
1983	High Road to China	Tom Selleck, Bess Armstrong, Jack Weston	Warner Bros. Pictures

=== Actor ===
Film

Year	Title	Role	Notes
1955	Good Morning, Miss Dove	Student	Uncredited
1957	Fear Strikes Out	Bernie Sherwill	Uncredited
1957	Gunfight at the O.K. Corral	Rick	
1957	Carnival Rock	Stanley	
1958	The Case Against Brooklyn	Jess Johnson	
1958	King Creole	Sal	
1959	Last Train from Gun Hill	Lee Smithers	
1959	The Big Fisherman	John	
1962	Geronimo	Indian Scout	Uncredited
1962	The Interns	Dr. Joe Parelli	

Television

Year	Title	Role	Notes
1956	Gunsmoke	Joe Trimble	Episode: "Custer"
1957	Official Detective	Branton	Episode: "The Wristwatch"
1957	Perry Mason	Rod Gleason	Episode: "The Case of the Sulky Girl"
1958	The Walter Winchell File	Jerry Milner	Episode: "The Bargain"
1959, 1962	Alfred Hitchcock Presents	Kenneth Jerome, Mitch	Episodes: "Your Witness", "The Big Kick"
1961	Rawhide	Chandler	Episode: "Incident on the Road Back"
