= Bachelor pad =

Slang term

Elsdon Best, Tom Wyatt and William Williams at the Old Shebang Bachelor pad in Wellington, New Zealand. 1883.

A bachelor pad is a home (pad) in which a bachelor or bachelors (single men) live. The exact standards on what constitutes a bachelor pad are often ambiguous and debated but one definition describes it as:

A "bachelor pad" is a slang term for a living space owned by a bachelor (single man) that is designed as a collective space (as opposed to individual items) with the purpose of facilitating a bachelor in his daily activities to include but not limited to daily functionality, use of free time, hobbies and interests, entertaining friends, and seducing women. A bachelor pad can be done on a very limited budget as is the case with many young adults and college students, or to an extravagant level as seen amongst some celebrities.

It should not be confused as such with "bachelor apartment", more commonly known as a studio apartment, a real estate term which refers an apartment with no bedroom – the main room serves as a bedroom, living room, and dining room (and sometimes kitchen as well).

== History ==
In the United Kingdom the term "bachelor pad" usually refers to a flat where a single young man lives alone. Most students in the UK, who are unable to afford this luxury, perforce live with other students, hence the heightened social status attributed to this particular sense of the phrase.

In the United States it generally refers to small houses or apartments where unmarried men, often college/university students, live until they obtain larger or more luxurious houses or apartments, are married, or generally "move up" in standards of living and taste. It also became a symbol of independence and freedom for young people when leaving their parents' house for the first time.

For much of the early 20th century housekeeping was the female ideal whilst it was a man's responsibility to be the breadwinner outside of the home.

By the late 1950s into the 1960s, however, the bachelor pad was considered one of the prime possessions for a young career-minded man with the disposable income (its first mention in print was 7 June 1959, in the Chicago Tribune). In this private space of his own he was able to decorate his apartment to both suit his tastes and reflect his status (often according to the epicurian dictates or hedonistic ethos of Playboy magazine). In the 1950s, men's attitudes about marriage changed with openness of sexuality featured on-screen. At this cultural tipping point the thought of being single was welcomed as permitting freedom of action, and many men felt comfortable to court a number of women freely without matrimony in mind. Hence the bachelor pad then became a symbol, and eventually a cliché, of the Swinging '60s cosmopolitan male.

The typical accoutrements of a "pad" featured a bar, artwork, designer furniture (usually by a well-known architect), minimalistic décor, and a hi-fi stereo system (for jazz and lounge music). All of which supposedly showcased the bachelor's appreciation of culture and the arts, which in turn attracted potential female visitors themselves seeking high-status mates – which meant they were usually kept clean. Fictional examples can be seen in films such as Rock Hudson's pad in Pillow Talk (1959), Oceans 11 (1960), Come Blow Your Horn (1963), Boeing Boeing (1965), James Bond's residence in any of the early Bond films, The Ipcress File (1965), (a low-key example vis-à-vis Alfie (1966)), Brian Bedfords' in The Pad (and How to Use It) (1966), and, decades later, the Mollywood Malayalam-language remake Boeing Boeing (1985), Tony Stark's Malibu Mansion in the MCU franchise, Love Stinks (1999), Down With Love (2003), and the entirety of the Austin Powers franchise. While in some of these, the bachelor pad serves merely to connote a character's bon vivant personality, most of them are bedroom farces and romantic comedies.

After their heyday, bachelor pads were more bohemian than parvenu bourgeois, with old food and dirty dishes and clothing being strewn about the floor, sinks, and other areas in proximity to places where they are useful (examples being dirty clothes piled up near a washer and/or dryer, dirty dishes in a sink, or moldy food in a refrigerator) – often to the disgust of women related to or involved with the men living in "pads". Several men may share a pad and its expenses for financial reasons or friendship, which stereotypically worsens living conditions compared to the one person case, as depicted in The Odd Couple and its derivatives. Pads may also be the sites of wild parties. On the 2021 musical film Tick, Tick... Boom!, the song "Boho Days" depicts the bohemian lifestyle through the description of a messy and disorganized apartment with "dishes in the sink", where the "toilet's in the closet" and the "shower's in the kitchen", while the protagonist, Jonathan Larson (portrayed by Andrew Garfield), hosts a party at his apartment and sings it.

In the late 1990s, bachelor pads became unique spaces and habitat of many free-spirited youngsters as documented by photographer Michael Rababy.

Unmarried men's living accommodations are often detailed in fiction in a way in which women's flats are not. Examples from the range of fiction include: the home of Withnail and his flatmate in the film Withnail and I. A less desirable pad was depicted in the 1966 film The Pad and How to Use It. Finally, the famous shared rooms of Sherlock Holmes and Dr. Watson were a combination dining room, interview room, laboratory and library.

== See also ==
- Bedsit
- Man cave
- Pied-à-terre
- Studio apartment
