= Farentino =

Farentino is a surname of Italian origin. Notable people with the surname include:

- Debrah Farentino (born 1959), American actress
- James Farentino (1938–2012), American screen actor
- Stella Farentino (born 1962), Canadian actress, former wife of James
