= Nick Navarro =

Nick Navarro may refer to:

- Nick Navarro (sheriff) (1929-2011), Cuban-American businessman and former sheriff of Broward County, Florida
- Nick Navarro (dancer) (born 1938), Mexican-American dancer and choreographer
