= List of stage names: N =

This list of stage names lists names used by those in the entertainment industry, alphabetically by their stage name's surname (or the best approximation) followed by the given name (or the best approximation) where the surname begins with "A". One-word stage names are presented in List of one-word stage names.

Stage name	Birth name	Life	Notability	Notes
Marie N	Marija Naumova	1973–	Latvian singer	
Paul Nabor	Alfonso Palacio	1928–2014	Belizean musician	
Fearless Nadia	Mary Ann Evans	1908–1996	Australian-Indian actress and stuntwoman	
Anne Nagel	Anne Dolan	1915–1966	American actress	
Jimmy Nail	James Bradford	1954–	English singer-songwriter, actor and television writer	
Laurence Naismith	Lawrence Johnson	1908–1992	English actor	
Bif Naked	Beth Nicole Torbert	1971–	Indian-Canadian singer	Also known as Beth Hopkins
Reggie Nalder	Alfred Reginald Natzler	1907–1991	Austrian actor	
Nita Naldi	Mary Nonna Dooley	1894–1961	American actress	
Marguerite Namara	Marguerite Banks	1888–1974	American soprano	
Billy Name	William Linich	1940–2016	American photographer, filmmaker and lighting designer	
Diana Napier	Alice Mary Ellis	1905–1982	English actress	
Big Narstie	Tyrone Mark Lindo	1985–	British rapper	
Paul Naschy	Jacinto Molina Álvarez	1934–2009	Spanish actor, screenwriter and director	
Niecy Nash	Carol Denise Ensley	1970–	American actress	
Adile Naşit	Adela Özcan	1930–1987	Turkish actress	
Marie-José Nat	Marie-José Benhalassa	1940–2019	French actress	
Bernard Natan	Natan Tannenzaft	1886–1942 or 1943	French-Romanian film entrepreneur, director and actor	
Taz Stereo Nation	Tarsame Saini	1967–2022	British singer and actor	
Nick Navarro	Nicholas Covacevich	1938–	Mexican-American former dancer and choreographer	
Alla Nazimova	Marem-Ides Leventon	1879–1945	Russian-American actress	Russian language birthname: Adelaida Yakovlevna Leventon
Amedeo Nazzari	Amedeo Buffa	1907–1979	Italian actor	
Meshell Ndegeocello	Michelle Johnson	1968–	American singer-songwriter, rapper and musician	Also known as Meshell Bashir-Shakur
Anna Neagle	Florence Robertson	1904–1986	English actress and singer	
Nelson Ned	Nelson Ned d'Ávila	1947–2014	Brazilian singer-songwriter	
Connie Needham	Connie Marie Bowen	1959–	American actress	
Pola Negri	Apolonia Chałupiec	1897–1987	Polish actress and singer	
Vince Neil	Vincent Neil Wharton	1961–	American musician (Mötley Crüe)	
Roy William Neill	Roland de Gostrie	1887–1946	Irish-American film director	
Annabelle Neilson	Iona Annabelle Neilson	1969–2018	British socialite, fashion model, author, and television personality	
Perlita Neilson	Margaret Sowden	1933–2014	English actress	
Barry Nelson	Robert Nielsen	1917–2007	American actor	
Gene Nelson	Leander Eugene Berg	1920–1996	American actor	
Neil Nephew	Neil Bernstein	1939–1978	American actor	
Nadia Nerina	Nadine Judd	1927–2008	South African dancer	
Carlo Nero	Carlo Sparanero	1969–	Italian-English screenwriter and director	
Franco Nero	Francesco Sparanero	1941–	Italian actor	
Derren Nesbitt	Derren Horwitz	1935–	English actor	
Mary Newland	Lilian Mary Oldland	1903–1984	English actress	
Julie Newmar	Julia Newmeyer	1933–	American actress	
Fred Niblo	Frederick Liedtke	1874–1948	American actor, director and producer	
Hellé Nice	Mariette Hélène Delangle	1900–1984	French model and motor racing driver	
Paul Nicholas	Paul Beuselinck	1944–	English actor and singer	
Barbara Nichols	Barbara Nickerauer	1928–1976	American actress	
Dandy Nichols	Daisy Sander	1907–1986	English actress	
Mike Nichols	Igor Peschkowsky	1931–2014	American director and producer	
Wade Nichols	Dennis Posa	1946–1985	American actor and singer	Also known as Dennis Parker
Crista Nicole	Crista Nicola Wagner	1978–	American model	
Nicki Nicole	Nicole Denise Cucco	2000–	Argentine rapper and singer-songwriter	
Maggie Nicols	Margaret Nicholson	1948–	Scottish singer, dancer and performer	
Rosemary Nicols	Rosemary Claxton	1941–	English actress and writer	
Lisa Niemi	Lisa Haapaniemi	1956–	American actress and director	
Steve Nieve	Steve Nason	1958–	English musician and composer (The Attractions)	
Robert Nighthawk	Robert McCollum	1909–1967	American musician	
Willie Nile	Robert Noonan	1948–	American singer-songwriter	
Marika Ninou	Evangelia Atamian	1922–1957	Armenian-Greek singer	
Marian Nixon	Marian Nissinen	1904–1983	Finnish-American actress	
Marni Nixon	Margaret Nixon McEathron	1930–2016	American singer and actress	
Mojo Nixon	Neill McMillan Jr.	1957–2024	American musician and actor	
J Noa	Nohelys Jiménez	2005–	Dominican rapper, singer and songwriter	
Danbert Nobacon	Nigel Hunter	1962–	English musician (Chumbawamba)	
Chelsea Noble	Nancy Mueller	1964–	American actress	
Nick Noble	Nicholas Valkan	1926–2012	American pop singer	
Young Noble	Rufus Cooper III	1978–	American rapper (Outlawz)	
Magali Noël	Magali Noëlle Guiffray	1931–2015	French actress and singer	
Paulette Noizeux	Marie-Paule Coeuré	1887–1971	French actress	
Princess Nokia	Destiny Frasqueri	1992–	American rapper and songwriter	
Eda Nolan	Eda Cabilan	1988–	Filipina actress	
Kathleen Nolan	Jocelyn Schrum	1933–	American actress	
Klaus Nomi	Klaus Sperber	1944–1983	German singer	
Tommy Noonan	Thomas Noone	1921–1968	American actor, screenwriter and producer	
Lillian Nordica	Lillian Norton	1857–1914	American opera singer	
Jimmy Norman	James Norman Scott	1937–2011	American singer-songwriter	
Lucille Norman	Lucille Boileau	1921–1998	American singer, radio personality and actress	
Peter North	Alden Brown	1957–	Canadian retired pornographic actor	
Sheree North	Dawn Shirley Crang	1932–2005	American actress, dancer and singer	
Barry Norton	Alfredo Birabén	1905–1956	Argentine-American actor	
Graham Norton	Graham Walker	1963–	Irish comedian, actor and television host	
Red Norvo	Kenneth Norville	1908–1999	American musician	
Nervous Norvus	James Drake	1912–1968	American musician	
Eille Norwood	Anthony Brett	1861–1948	English actor, director and playwright	
Aldo Nova	Aldo Caporuscio	1956–	Canadian musician	
Debi Nova	Deborah Nowalski Kader	1980–	Costa Rican singer-songwriter	
Heather Nova	Heather Frith	1968–	Bermudian singer-songwriter	
Mel Novak	Milan Mrdjenovich	1934–2025	American actor	
Ramon Novarro	José Ramón Samaniego	1899–1968	Mexican-American actor	
Novello Novelli	Novellantonio Novelli	1930–2018	Italian character actor	
Jay Novello	Michael Romano	1904–1982	American actor	
Big Noyd	TaJuan Perry	1975–	American rapper	
DJ Nu-Mark	Mark Potsic	1971–	American hip hop producer and DJ	
Audrey Nuna	Audrey Chu	1999–	American singer and rapper	
France Nuyen	France Nguyen Van-Nga	1939–	French actress and model	
Carrie Nye	Caroline Nye McGeoy	1936–2006	American actress	
Louis Nye	Louis Neistat	1913–2005	American comedian and actor	
Laura Nyro	Laura Nigro	1947–1997	American songwriter and singer	
