= Woodrow Chambliss =

American actor (1914–1981)

- Woodrow Chambliss in The Andy Griffith Show 1965
- Born: Woodrow Lewis Chambliss; October 14, 1914; Bowie, Texas, U.S.
- Died: January 8, 1981 (aged 66); Ojai, California, U.S.
- Other name: Woody Chambliss
- Occupation: Actor
- Years active: 1946–1981
- Spouse: Erika Kapralik
- Children: 3

Lewis Woodrow Chambliss (October 14, 1914 – January 8, 1981) was an American character actor who appeared in both feature films and television. He is perhaps best known for his appearances as several characters in the TV hit Gunsmoke, where he eventually settled into the recurring role of storekeeper Mr. Lathrop.

== Early life ==
Chambliss was born on October 14, 1914, in Bowie, Texas. He was the son of Lorenzo Dow “L.D.” and Lucinda “Lula Mae” Mae (Thornton) Chambliss, who had a farm outside Brownfield, Texas. He attended public schools in Brownfield and Baylor University, where his first contact with drama occurred as a prompter with the Baylor Little Theater. Intending to be a lawyer, Chambliss attended Baylor's law school, but a dramatics teacher at the university influenced him to change his major to theater arts.

== Career ==
After Chambliss left Baylor, he worked as a technician apprentice for a stock theater company in Milford Connecticut. Receiving a scholarship in the summer of 1937 enabled him to go to Bath, England, as a drama exchange student and study with Michael Chekhov. He became a member of the Checkov Theater company at Dartington Hall, Devonshire, and returned to the United States when the group moved because of the threat of war. A Bath newspaper described Chambliss's portrayal of a grandfather in a production of the 1937 Summer Drama School at Citizen House, Bath, as "a performance of outstanding merit, quite worthy of the professional stage".

He made his Broadway debut in a 1939 Chekhov production of The Possessed. The cast also included his wife, Erika Kapralik, and actor Ford Rainey, but the play only ran for fourteen performances on Broadway.

During World War II, he worked at the Naval Construction Battalion Center Port Hueneme naval base in Port Hueneme, California. After the war, he and others from the Chekhov company established a repertory troupe that for four years performed in the Happy Valley Theater in Ojai, California. Chambliss went on to become the manager of the Senior Canyon Mutual Water Company prior to resuming his theater career.

Chambliss made his first on-screen appearance in 1946, in an uncredited role in Jean Negulesco's Three Strangers, followed by several uncredited roles in films such as 3:10 to Yuma and Zero Hour!. In 1965, he received a supporting role in Wild Seed, directed by Brian G. Hutton and starring Michael Parks. He appeared in the post-apocalyptic Sci-fi drama Glen and Randa in 1971, notable for its "X" rating from MPAA at the time of release. He continued appearing in film throughout the 1970s, with roles in Greaser's Palace, Cry for Me, Billy, The Devil's Rain and the jukebox musical comedy Sgt. Pepper's Lonely Hearts Club Band.

In addition to his work on Gunsmoke, where he eventually settled into the recurring role of storekeeper Mr. Lathrop, he also had a recurring role as riverboat Captain Tom of the "Sultana" on the TV show Yancy Derringer.

He also appeared in two 1958 episodes of Perry Mason: as Phil Reese in "The Case of the Fugitive Nurse," and Fred Haley in "The Case of the Lucky Loser." In 1960, he appeared in Gene Barry's TV Western series Bat Masterson as town undertaker Mr. O’Malley (S2E20). In 1965, he appeared on The Andy Griffith Show in the episode, "Aunt Bee's Invisible Beau", as their butter-and-egg-man. He and wife Erika also appeared together as grandparents in the 1978 TV movie Forever. He also played the role of Zadok Walton, cousin to Grandpa Walton, on a Season 8 episode of The Waltons.

== Personal life and death ==
He was married to Romanian actress Erika Kapralik (September 6, 1911 – May 14, 1992 in Ojai, California). They had three children. He died on January 8, 1981, in Ojai of colon cancer.

== Filmography ==
Film
Year	Title	Role	Notes	Ref.
1946	Three Strangers	Man in Pub	Uncredited	
1957	3:10 to Yuma	Blacksmith	Uncredited	
1957	Zero Hour!	Reporter	Uncredited	
1964	Invitation to a Gunfighter	Townsman	Uncredited	
1965	Wild Seed	Mr. Simms		
1966	The Chase	Salesman	Uncredited	
1970	The Wild Country	Dakota		
1971	Glen and Randa	Sidney Miller		
1972	Greaser's Palace	Father		
1972	Cry for Me, Billy	Prospector		
1973	Scorpio		Uncredited	
1975	The Devil's Rain	John		
1978	Sgt. Pepper's Lonely Hearts Club Band	Old Sgt. Pepper		
1980	Cloud Dancer	Curtis Pitts		
1981	Second-Hand Hearts	Deaf Attendant	Posthumous release	
1983	Reckless (aka Reckless and in Love)		Posthumous release	

Television
Year	Title	Role	Notes	Ref.
1957	The Gale Storm Show		Episode: "The Blarney Stone"	
1957–1975	Gunsmoke	Various roles	38 episodes	
1957–1961	Have Gun – Will Travel	Hotel Clerk	Episode: The Colonel and the Lady"	
1957–1961	Have Gun – Will Travel	McCormack	Episode: "Blind Circle"	
1957	Trackdown	Horsetrader	Episode: "End of an Outlaw" (uncredited)	
1957	Sugarfoot	Boswell Newsom	Episode: "Misfire"	
1958	Playhouse 90	Pete	Episode: "The Last Man"	
1958	Perry Mason	Philip Connors	Episode: "The Case of the Fugitive Nurse"	
1958	Perry Mason	Fred Haley	Episode: "The Case of The Lucky Loser"	
1958–1959	Yancy Derringer	Captain Tom	9 episodes	
1960–1964	Death Valley Days	Judge Bristol	Episode: "Shadows on the Window"	
1960–1964	Death Valley Days	Stage Driver	Episode: "The Vintage Years" (uncredited)	
1960–1964	Death Valley Days	Stage Driver	Episode: "The Last Stagecoach Robbery"	
1960	Bat Masterson	O'Malley	Episode: "Six Feet of Gold"	
1961	The Untouchables	Burt	Episode: "The Big Train: Part 2"	
1961	Lassie	Hank Loomis	Episode: "The Trip"	
1961	My Three Sons	Edgar Loos	Episode: "Deadline"	
1965	The Andy Griffith Show	Orville Hendricks	Episode: "Aunt Bee's Invisible Beau"	
1965	The Andy Griffith Show	Harlan Robinson	Episode: "The Church Organ"	
1966	The Wild Wild West	Bill Wingo	Episode: "The Night of the Flying Pie Plate"	
1967	Cimarron Strip	Oliver Wheelwright	Episode: "The Beast That Walks Like a Man"	
1969	Then Came Bronson	Abner Hotchman	Episode: "The Circle of Time"	
1970	The Virginian	MacIntosh	Episode: "Experiment in New Life"	
1971	Bearcats!	Mayor Evans	Episode: "The Feathered Serpent"	
1973	Doc Elliot	Kelsey	Episode: "And All Ye Need to Know"	
1974	Dirty Sally	Doc Carter	Episode: "I Never Saw the Pacific"	
1974–1976	The Six Million Dollar Man	Pop	Episode: "The Midas Touch"	
1974–1976	The Six Million Dollar Man	Mr. Savannah	Episode: "The Bionic Boy"	
1975	Disneyland	Dakota	Episode: "Wild Country: Part 2"	
1975	Three for the Road		Episode: "The Trail of Bigfoot"	
1976	Police Woman	Martin Shaw	Episode: "Night of the Full Moon"	
1977	Logan's Run	Lab Tech One	Episode: "Man Out of Time"	
1978–1979	How the West Was Won	Mr. McGreevy	Episode: "Buffalo Story"	
1978–1979	How the West Was Won	Mr. McGreevy	Episode: "Cattle Drive" (uncredited)	
1978–1979	How the West Was Won	Mr. McGreevy	Episode: "Brothers"	
1978–1979	How the West Was Won	Citizen	Episode: "Hillary"	
1980	The Waltons	Zadok Walton	Episode: "The Remembrance"	

Television film
Year	Title	Role	Notes	Ref.
1970	Cutter's Trail	Thompson		
1972	The Great Man's Whiskers	Paddleford		
1972	Footsteps	Minister		
1972	Gargoyles	Uncle Willie		
1973	Class of '63	Dr. Pillard		
1973	The Red Pony	Orville Frye		
1974	The Autobiography of Miss Jane Pittman	Freedom Investigator	Uncredited	
1974	The Stranger Who Looks Like Me	Paul		
1975	Huckleberry Finn	Auctioneer		
1975	Perilous Voyage		Uncredited	
1977	There's Always Room	McRaven		
1978	Forever	Grandfather		
1978	Lassie: The New Beginning	Victor Turkey		
1979	Better Late Than Never	Woody		
1981	Murder in Texas	Oilman	Posthumous broadcast	
1981	Through the Magic Pyramid (aka The Time Crystal)	Stable Master	Posthumous broadcast	
