= Julie Sommars =

American actress (born 1940)

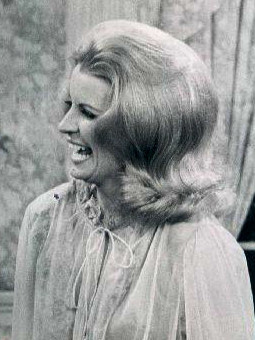
- Sommars in 1970
- Born: April 15, 1940 (age 86); Fremont, Nebraska, U.S.
- Occupation: Actress
- Years active: 1960–1994
- Known for: The Governor & J.J. Matlock; Herbie Goes to Monte Carlo
- Spouse(s): Jack Donner (m. 1960; div. 196?) Robert Trentacosta (m. 1964; div. 1965) Stuart Erwin Jr. (m. 1971; div. 1980) John Karns (m. 1984; died 2023)
- Children: 2

Julie Sommars (born April 15, 1940) is an American retired actress. She won a Golden Globe Award for Best Actress – Television Series Musical or Comedy for her role in The Governor & J.J. in 1970, and was nominated for a Golden Globe Award for Best Supporting Actress on Television for Matlock in 1990.

== Early life ==
Sommars was born in Fremont, Nebraska, on April 15, 1940 to Louis and Helen (née Drummond) Sommars. She was raised in Iowa and South Dakota, along with her three brothers. In 1958, competing in South Dakota, she was the only female delegate, in the then-48 states, to win their state in the American Legion National High School Oratorical Contest.

== Career ==
=== Television ===
Sommars is best known for her work on television. She made her television debut in 1960, at the age of 18, in an episode of The Loretta Young Show. She later appeared in Gunsmoke; Shirley Temple's Storybook; The Great Adventure; Bonanza; Run, Buddy, Run; Perry Mason; Ben Casey; Death Valley Days; The Fugitive; The Man from U.N.C.L.E.; Get Smart; and Love, American Style.

Sommars starred as Jennifer Jo "J.J." Drinkwater, the daughter of Dan Dailey's the "Governor" in the CBS comedy series, for the two-season run of The Governor & J.J. (1969–1970); her performance earned her the Golden Globe Award for Best Actress – Television Series Musical or Comedy in 1970, with Dailey winning for Best Actor.

After The Governor & J.J., Sommars played the leading roles in a number of made-for-television movies and starred in several pilots. She guest-starred on The Rockford Files; Harry O; McCloud; McMillan; Barnaby Jones; Fantasy Island; Magnum, P.I.; and Diagnosis: Murder. In 1984, she was a regular cast member in the short-lived syndicated soap opera, Rituals. From 1987 to 1994, Sommars played Assistant District Attorney Julie March on the NBC legal series, Matlock. This role also garnered her a nomination for a Golden Globe Award for Best Supporting Actress on Television in 1990.

=== Film ===
Sommars has appeared in several films. She played the female lead in the 1965 Western The Great Sioux Massacre with Joseph Cotten. The following year, she starred with Brian Bedford in the comedy The Pad and How to Use It. In 1977, Sommars co-starred with Dean Jones and Don Knotts as the beautiful, but assertive Diane Darcy in Herbie Goes to Monte Carlo.

== Personal life ==
Sommars has been married four times. She married her first husband, Jack Donner, in 1960, but had divorced by 1964, when she married her second husband, Robert Trentacosta, which also ended in divorce, in 1965. She next married Stuart Erwin Jr., in 1971; they had three children together before they divorced in 1980. She married her fourth husband, John Karns, in 1984, and they were together until his death in 2023.

Sommars has been politically active, serving on the California Commission on Judicial Performance in the 90s. She was eventually appointed to the State Bar Board of Governors in May 2000, during the term of Governor Gray Davis, where she served for three years.

== Filmography ==
- Letter to Loretta as Laury Barlow (1 episode, 1960)
- Sea Hunt as Betty Crane (season 3, episode 31, 1960)
- Shirley Temple's Storybook as Princess Mary (1 episode, 1960)
- Holiday Lodge as Cecilia (1 episode, 1961)
- The Tall Man as Anna Henry (1 episode, 1961)
- Outlaws as Ellie (1 episode, 1961)
- The Great Adventure as Meg Jethro (1 episode, 1964)
- Memo from Purgatory (1964)
- Bonanza – Episode – The Roper – Emma Hewitt (1964)
- Sex and the College Girl (1964) as Susan
- Slattery's People as Electra Walton (1 episode, 1965)
- Flipper as Tina's Mother (1 episode, 1965)
- Perry Mason as Helen Kendall (1 episode, 1965)
- Mr. Novak as Ellen Cable (1 episode, 1965)
- Ben Casey as Ruth Ann Carmody (1 episode, 1965)
- The Great Sioux Massacre (1965) as Caroline Reno
- Death Valley Days as Tulie in "Peter the Hunter", and as Sister Blandina Segale in "The Fastest Nun in the West" (2 episodes, 1964, 1966)
- Gunsmoke as Bess Campbell (4 episodes, 1964–1966; as Elsie Howell, 1 episode, 1965; as Sara Stone, 1 episode, 1966; as Gert)
- The Pad and How to Use It (1966) as Doreen Marshall
- Run, Buddy, Run as Betsy Jensen (1 episode, 1966)
- Bob Hope Presents the Chrysler Theatre as Maggie Lake (1 episode, 1966)
- The Fugitive as Carla Karac (2 episodes, 1965–1966)
- My Husband Tom...and John unaired pilot film (1966)
- The Man from U.N.C.L.E. as Darlene Sims (2 episodes, 1965–1967)
- The Invaders as Grace Vincent (1 episode, 1967)
- He & She as Rosemary Wallace (1 episode, 1967)
- Dundee and the Culhane as Lela (1 episode, 1967)
- Get Smart as Mimsi Sage (1 episode, 1968)
- European Eye (1968) as Molly
- Felony Squad as Ellen Willis (2 episodes, 1968)
- Judd, for the Defense as Trish Overbaugh (1 episode, 1968)
- The Name of the Game as Barbara Ellis (1 episode, 1968)
- The Virginian as Martha Carson (1 episode, 1968)
- The F.B.I. as Betty Caldwell (3 episodes, 1967–1969)
- Lancer as Catha Cameron (1 episode, 1969)
- The Governor & J.J. as Jennifer Jo Drinkwater (39 episodes, 1969–1970)
- Five Desperate Women (1971) as Mary Grace Brown
- The Harness (1971) as Jennifer Shagaras
- How to Steal an Airplane (1971) as Dorothy
- McCloud as Jennie (1 episode, 1971)
- Owen Marshall, Counselor at Law as Jill Peniman (1 episode, 1972)
- Rex Harrison Presents Stories of Love (1974) as Patricia
- Thriller as Ann Rogers (1 episode, 1974)
- Fools, Females and Fun as Alice Shoemaker (1974)
- Harry O as Gertrude Blainey (1 episode, 1974)
- The Rockford Files as Tawnia Baker (1 episode, 1974)
- McCloud as Police Sgt. Mildred Cross (1 episode, 1974)
- Barnaby Jones as Ruby Deems (1 episode, 1974)
- Switch as Lane Cameron (1 episode, 1975)
- The Family Holvak as Kate Gifford (1 episode, 1975)
- Three for the Road as Amy Parsons (1 episode, 1975)
- Ellery Queen as Emmy Reinhart (1 episode, 1975)
- Bronk as Sara (1 episode, 1976)
- Jigsaw John as Carol Chapman (1 episode, 1976)
- McMillan & Wife as Carol Hanover (1 episode, 1977)
- Herbie Goes to Monte Carlo (1977) as Diane Darcy
- Fantasy Island as Carmen Drake (1 episode, 1978)
- Centennial as Alice Grebe (1 episode, 1979)
- Sex and the Single Parent as Bonnie (1979)
- Barnaby Jones as Amy Cameron (1 episode, 1979)
- Beyond Westworld as Liz Nicholson (1 episode, 1980)
- Fantasy Island as Laura Crane (1 episode, 1980)
- Magnum, P.I. as Jennie 'JL' Lowry/Texas Lightning (1 episode, 1982)
- Cave-In! (1983) as Liz Johnson
- Emergency Room (1983) as Nina Cole
- Partners in Crime as Nola (1 episode, 1984)
- Perry Mason: The Case of the Glass Coffin (1991) as Betty Farmer
- Matlock as ADA Julie March (94 episodes, 1987–1992, 1 episode in 1994)
- Diagnosis: Murder as Regina Baylor (1 episode, 1994)
