= The Governor & J.J. =

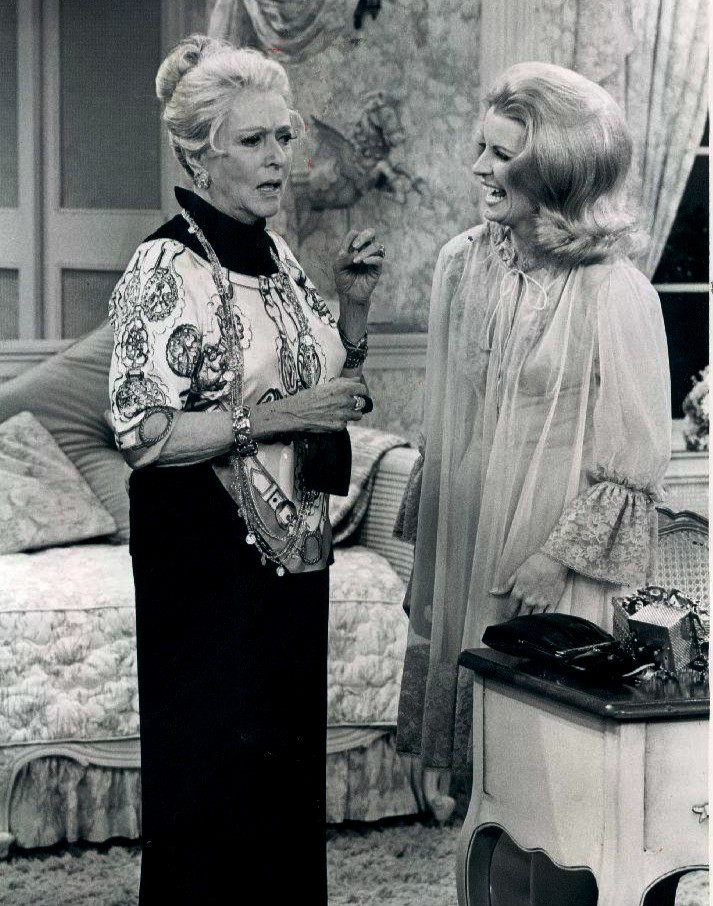
- Jessie Royce Landis and Julie Sommars, 1970.
- Genre: Comedy
- Created by: Leonard Stern; Arne Sultan
- Starring: Dan Dailey; Julie Sommars; James T. Callahan; Neva Patterson; Nora Marlowe
- Theme music composer: Jerry Fielding
- Composer: Jerry Fielding
- Country of origin: United States
- Original language: English
- No. of seasons: 2
- No. of episodes: 39

Production
- Executive producer: Leonard Stern
- Producers: Arne Sultan; David Davis
- Production locations: CBS Studio Center, Studio City, Los Angeles, California, United States
- Running time: 30 minutes
- Production company: Talent Associates-Norton Simon

Original release
- Network: CBS
- Release: 23 September 1969 – 30 December 1970

The Governor & J.J. is a television series that ran from September 1969 to December 1970 on CBS in the United States and in Canada, where it ran on CBC Television. Selected episodes were rerun by CBS during the summer of 1972. It was produced by Talent Associates and CBS Productions. CBS Media Ventures now owns the distribution rights to the program.

The series starred Dan Dailey and Julie Sommars. It focused on William Drinkwater (Dailey), a governor in an unnamed Midwestern state, who, in lieu of his late wife, had a "first lady" in his 20-something year-old daughter, Jennifer Jo (Sommars). J.J., as Jennifer Jo was called, had a regular job as an assistant curator at a zoo in the capital city and had a love for animals. She was bright and opinionated and could debate political issues with her father as well as anyone else. Despite their difference in opinions (she was more liberal, and he was more conservative), William really loved J.J., and she proved herself to be charming and efficient in her duties being "first lady" for her father. J.J. often gained support and advice from Maggie McLeod (Neva Patterson), the governor's secretary; George Callison (James T. Callahan), the governor's press secretary; and from Sara Andrews (Nora Marlowe), the housekeeper at the governor's mansion.

== Broadcast history ==
Viewership and ratings per season of The Governor & J.J.
| Season | Timeslot () | Episodes | First aired | Last aired | Ref. |
|---|---|---|---|---|---|
| 1 | Tuesday at 9:30 pm | 26 | September 23, 1969 | March 31, 1970 | N/A |
| 2 | Wednesday at 8:30 pm | 13 | September 23, 1970 | December 30, 1970 | N/A |

== Trivia ==
The series won two Golden Globe Awards in 1970 for Best Actress in a Comedy/Musical TV Series for Sommars and Best Actor in a Comedy/Musical TV Series for Dailey. It was also nominated for Best Comedy/Musical TV Series that year.

Later in the series, J.J. adopted a stray Basset Hound. They discovered its name "Governor" when it barked when people addressed Governor Drinkwater.

Francis DeSales guest-starred as Senator Loomis in the 1970 episode "Charley's Back in Town".

The series sometimes featured guest appearances by then current governors, including Robert Docking of Kansas and Deane C. Davis of Vermont.

In real life, Sommars has been involved in politics, mostly behind the scenes with the Republican Party.

When the program was canceled by CBS, it was replaced in its Wednesday timeslot by To Rome with Love, which had moved from Tuesdays to make room for All in the Family. To Rome with Love was canceled at the end of the 1970–71 season. CBS aired reruns of the series in the summer of 1972.

== Series overview ==
| Season | Episodes | Originally released | |
| Season | Episodes | First released | Last released |
|---|---|---|---|
| 1 | 26 | September 23, 1969 | March 31, 1970 |
| 2 | 13 | September 16, 1970 | December 30, 1970 |

== Episodes ==
=== Season 1 (1969–70) ===
| No. overall | No. in season | Title | Directed by | Written by | Original release date | Prod. code |
|---|---|---|---|---|---|---|
| 1 | 1 | "The Second 1st Lady" | Leonard Stern | Arne Sultan & Leonard Stern | September 23, 1969 | 2845 |
| 2 | 2 | "There Go the Judge" | Leonard Stern | Allan Burns | September 30, 1969 | 1646–0654 |
| 3 | 3 | "Romeo and J.J." | Alan Rafkin | Joanna Lee | October 14, 1969 | 1646–0657 |
| 4 | 4 | "One Little Indian" | Jay Sandrich | Earl Barret & Leonard Stern & Arne Sultan | October 21, 1969 | 1646–0653 |
| 5 | 5 | "Cat on a Hot Tin Mansion" | Leonard Stern | Arne Sultan & Leonard Stern | October 28, 1969 | 1646–0656 |
| 6 | 6 | "The Butterfly Man of Alcazar" | Jay Sandrich | Roland Wolpert | November 4, 1969 | 1646–0662 |
| 7 | 7 | "Come Fly Without Me" | Leonard Stern | Arne Sultan & Earl Barret & Leonard Stern | November 11, 1969 | 1646–0659 |
| 8 | 8 | "Rhyme with Reason" | Alan Rafkin | Chris Hayward & Earl Barret | November 18, 1969 | 1646–0655 |
| 9 | 9 | "My Good Friend, What's His Name?" | Jay Sandrich | Chris Hayward & Arne Sultan & Leonard Stern | November 25, 1969 | 1646–0652 |
| 10 | 10 | "Springtime for Maggie" | Lee Philips | Gene Thompson | December 2, 1969 | 1646–0661 |
| 11 | 11 | "State of Reunion" | Jay Sandrich | Barbara Avedon | December 9, 1969 | 1646–0660 |
| 12 | 12 | "Bunky's Buddy" | Alan Rafkin | Arne Sultan & Earl Barret | December 16, 1969 | 1646–0663 |
| 13 | 13 | "The Governor's Portrait" | Nicholas Colasanto | Harry Winkler | December 23, 1969 | 1646–0651 |
| 14 | 14 | "Profile in Discourage" | Lee Philips | Richard Morgan | December 30, 1969 | 1646–0658 |
| 15 | 15 | "Once Upon a War" | Alan Rafkin | Earl Barret | January 6, 1970 | 1646–0665 |
| 16 | 16 | "Never Judge a Book by Its Naked Cover" | Alan Rafkin | Alden Schwimmer | January 13, 1970 | 1646–0664 |
| 17 | 17 | "The Last Weekend" | Alan Rafkin | Earl Barret & Arne Sultan | January 20, 1970 | 1646–0666 |
| 18 | 18 | "The Tic Toc Tale" | Dan Dailey | Earl Barret & Arne Sultan | January 27, 1970 | 1646–0667 |
| 19 | 19 | "Luv the Guv" | George Tyne | Arne Sultan & Earl Barret | February 3, 1970 | 1646–0668 |
| 20 | 20 | "Bye, George" | Alan Rafkin | Earl Barret & Arne Sultan | February 17, 1970 | 1646–0669 |
| 21 | 21 | "Abe Lincoln Slept Here" | Jay Sandrich | Mort R. Lewis | February 24, 1970 | 1646–0671 |
| 22 | 22 | "Son of the Bride" | Dan Dailey | Barbara Avedon | March 3, 1970 | 1646–0673 |
| 23 | 23 | "The Governor Gets the Chair" | Jay Sandrich | Bill Manhoff | March 10, 1970 | 1646–0670 |
| 24 | 24 | "The Return of Doctor Livingston" | Alan Rafkin | Arne Sultan & Earl Barret | March 17, 1970 | 1646–0672 |
| 25 | 25 | "Charley's Back in Town" | Jay Sandrich | George Kirgo | March 24, 1970 | 1646–0674 |
| 26 | 26 | "Second Opinion" | Alan Rafkin | Arne Sultan & Earl Barret | March 31, 1970 | 1646–0675 |

=== Season 2 (1970) ===
| No. overall | No. in season | Title | Directed by | Written by | Original release date | Prod. code |
|---|---|---|---|---|---|---|
| 27 | 1 | "And the World Begat the Bleep" | Alan Rafkin | Arne Sultan & Earl Barret | September 23, 1970 | 1646–0902 |
| 28 | 2 | "Ben and Her" | Alan Rafkin | Bill Manhoff | September 30, 1970 | 1646–0904 |
| 29 | 3 | "Read That Leg to Me Again" | Alan Rafkin | Earl Barret & Arne Sultan | October 7, 1970 | 1646–0903 |
| 30 | 4 | "File Safe" | George Tyne | Chris Hayward & Arne Sultan & Leonard Stern | October 14, 1970 | 1646–0905 |
| 31 | 5 | "Run Ballerina, Run" | Alan Rafkin | Arne Sultan & Earl Barret | October 21, 1970 | 1646–0901 |
| 32 | 6 | "Fawcett Is Running" | Alan Rafkin | Jay Terry | October 28, 1970 | 1646–0909 |
| 33 | 7 | "Maid for Sara" | Dan Dailey | Arthur Sultan & Frank Red Benson | November 11, 1970 | 1646–0906 |
| 34 | 8 | "Check the Check" | Alan Rafkin | Arne Sultan & Earl Barret | November 18, 1970 | 1646–0908 |
| 35 | 9 | "The Making of the Governor" | Charles Walters | Burt Prelutsky | November 25, 1970 | 1646–0907 |
| 36 | 10 | "A Day in the Life" | Alan Rafkin | Roger Price | December 9, 1970 | 1646–0912 |
| 37 | 11 | "Twice in a Lifetime" | Alan Rafkin | Story by : Arthur Sultan; Teleplay by : Earl Barret | December 16, 1970 | 1646–0911 |
| 38 | 12 | "P.S. I Don't Love You" | Dan Dailey | Douglas Morrow | December 23, 1970 | 1646–0910 |
| 39 | 13 | "From Here to Maternity" | Earl Barret | Earl Barret & Arne Sultan | December 30, 1970 | 1646–0913 |
