= Fluffy (1965 film) =

1965 film by Earl Bellamy

- Theatrical release poster
- Directed by: Earl Bellamy
- Written by: Samuel Roeca
- Produced by: Gordon Kay
- Starring: Tony Randall; Shirley Jones; Edward Andrews; Howard Morris; Ernest Truex; Jim Backus; Frank Faylen; Celia Kaye; Dick Sargent
- Cinematography: Clifford Stine
- Edited by: Russell F. Schoengarth
- Music by: Irving Gertz
- Production company: Scarus
- Distributed by: Universal Pictures
- Release dates: June 27, 1965 (U.S.); December 30, 1965 (U.K.)
- Running time: 92 Minutes
- Country: United States
- Language: English

Fluffy is a 1965 American comedy film written by Samuel Roeca, directed by Earl Bellamy, and starring Tony Randall and Shirley Jones (with an uncharacteristic brunette hairstyle).

== Plot ==
A scientist (Tony Randall) attempts to prove that, with the proper training, a wild animal (in this case, a lion named Fluffy) can be made into a pet.

== Cast ==
- Tony Randall as Professor Daniel Potter
- Shirley Jones as Janice Claridge
- Edward Andrews as Griswald
- Howard Morris as Sweeney
- Ernest Truex as Mr. Claridge
- Jim Backus as Sergeant
- Frank Faylen as Catfish
- Celia Kaye as Sally Brighton
- Dick Sargent as Tommy
- Adam Roarke as Bob Brighton
- Whit Bissell as Dr. Braden
- Harriet MacGibbon as Mrs. Claridge
- Jim Boles as Pete
- Parley Baer as Police Captain
- Connie Gilchrist as Maid
- Stuart Randall as State Trooper
- Sammee Tong as Cook
- Barry O'Hara as Fireman #2
- Sam Gilman as Policeman
- Milton Frome as Tweedy Physicist
- Doodles Weaver as Yokel
