= Wild Seed (film) =

1965 film by Brian G. Hutton

- Theatrical release poster
- Directed by: Brian G. Hutton
- Screenplay by: Lester Pine
- Story by: Ike Jones; Lester Pine
- Produced by: Marlon Brando, Sr. Albert S. Ruddy
- Starring: Michael Parks; Celia Kaye
- Cinematography: Conrad L. Hall
- Edited by: Hugh S. Fowler
- Music by: Richard Markowitz
- Production company: Pennebaker Productions
- Distributed by: Universal Pictures
- Release date: May 5, 1965 (Chicago)
- Running time: 99 minutes
- Country: United States
- Language: English
- Budget: less than $300,000

Wild Seed is a 1965 American drama romance film directed by Brian G. Hutton and starring Michael Parks and Celia Kaye. The film was shot in black and white.

== Plot ==
Seventeen-year-old Daphne Simms (Kaye) learns of her biological father from letters left by her deceased mother. She runs away from her New York home and adopted parents in search of her birth father in Los Angeles. Unaware of the dangers on the road, she attempts to hitchhike but learns a valuable lesson early. A seemingly nice, middle-aged man offers her a ride then takes her into a deserted area where he tries to take advantage of her. She manages to escape, but she is left in the darkness in the middle of nowhere. She succeeds in finding the main road and eventually reaches a gas station. It is here she meets Fargo (Parks). Initially wary of his attention, they eventually start a conversation. Though it appears that Fargo's intentions are to hustle her for money, she agrees to allow him to help her get to California. Through run-ins with his fellow hobos and then the police, arguments with and misunderstandings about each other, she is able to nurse him through a fever after being exposed to inclement weather while on their journey. They develop a sympatico, and begin to have romantic feelings for each other.

Upon arriving in L.A., Daphne finds her father, but she is disappointed. At the couple's hotel, Daphne's adopted parents arrive and ask her to accompany them home. They express forgiveness and a willingness to accept Fargo, suggesting they will help him settle in New York. Fargo rejects the offer and tells Daphne to go with her parents. Later that night as he leaves a bar, he finds Daphne waiting for him outside. She has decided to stay with him and live on the road. Arms around each other, they walk along the dark street.

== Cast ==
- Michael Parks as Fargo
- Celia Kaye as Daphne
- Ross Elliott as Mr. Collinge
- Woody Chambliss as Mr. Simms
- Rupert Crosse as Hobo
- Eva Novak as Mrs. Simms
- Norman Burton as Policeman
- Merritt Bohn as Constable
- Al Lettieri as Bartender

== Production ==
The film was originally known as Daffy. The script originally was written in 1957 and sold to Marlon Brando's company, Pennebaker Productions. Initially considered as a starring vehicle for Brando, the actor was deemed too old for the part. The film was shot in 24 days. Producer Ruddy had two endings filmed: One with the lovers going their separate ways; the other with them staying together.

== See also ==
- List of American films of 1965
