= Joe and Eddie =

American gospel folk group

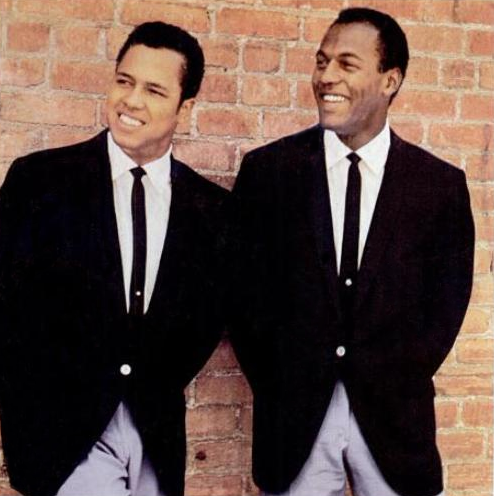
- Joe and Eddie in 1965

Background information
- Genres: Gospel, folk
- Years active: 1956–1966
- Past members: Joe Gilbert; Eddie Brown

Joe and Eddie were an American gospel folk duo. During their careers, the duo, composed of Joe Gilbert and Eddie Brown, toured the United States and Canada, appeared on more than 20 major television shows, and recorded eight albums.

== Career ==
Joe Gilbert and Eddie Brown were both born in 1941 and raised in the South. Gilbert was raised in New Orleans, Louisiana, while Brown grew up in Norfolk, Virginia. Around the same time, the two migrated to Berkeley, California, with their respective families, and met in the mid-1950s at Willard Middle School in the a cappella choir. Their first performance together was in the Berkeley High School Talent Show in 1956, where they sang a duet and won first place.

With the help of their high-school choir professor, Dr. Earle Blakeslee, the two young men formed a partnership and strove to go professional. Their first gigs were at college fraternity and sorority parties, where they performed a variety of numbers. Blakeslee advised them to audition for the Don Sherwood television show in San Francisco. They earned their spot and were asked back to the show several times. This led to engagements at the Purple Onion and the Hungry i nightclubs in San Francisco.

Through their television appearances, Joe and Eddie were introduced to Gene Norman, president of GNP Crescendo Records, and then co-owner of the Crescendo and Interlude nightclubs, who assisted in launching their career. It was through Norman that Joe and Eddie recorded their first single and, by 1962, their first album, Exciting Folk Duo: Joe & Eddie (re-released after Gilbert's death as Down to Earth). They began touring and for four years continued to record more albums with GNP/Crescendo Records.

After the release of their first album, Joe and Eddie appeared on more television shows, including The Tonight Show, The Lively Ones, Hootenanny, and The Jackie Gleason Show. During this time, they recorded their second album, There's a Meetin' Here Tonite, which peaked at No. 119 on the Billboard 200 and No. 68 on the Cash Box's Top 100 Albums. The title song, which is an adaptation of a Negro spiritual, became their signature tune. They performed this song in the film Hootenanny Hoot (1963). Their third album, Coast to Coast, charted at No. 140 on the Billboard 200 in 1964.

Along with recording their harmonies, the two took turns in recording solos ("The Work Song," and "The Things I've Saved"). Bill Munday accompanied them on his guitar, while in other songs, the Les Baxter Chorus sang back up.

Around the mid-1960s, the duo informed their childhood friend Paul Mooney of an up-and-coming comedian they saw in New York named Richard Pryor. Mooney would later become a writer for many of Pryor's jokes.

=== End of the duo ===
On August 6, 1966, Gilbert was killed in an automobile accident while driving home after a performance in the Cosmos Club in Seal Beach, California. He was survived by a wife, Judy, and two sons. Eddie Brown continued to record as a solo act. As of 2007, Brown was continuing to work as a record producer and music arranger, most recently with the musical group Gravity 180.

== Music style ==
The musical duo's focus was creating harmony with Joe Gilbert singing tenor and Eddie Brown singing baritone. Their style incorporated gospel, folk tunes, and blues with a little jazz flavor. Their songs contained a minimum of background instrumentation, since the "main objective was to focus on Joe & Eddie's singing..." The duo was known for their rapid-fire delivery and vocal improvisations, as heard in the songs "Green Grass" and "Children Go".

== Discography ==
- Exciting Folk Duo: Joe & Eddie (1962 GNP/Crescendo 75) (reissued after Gilbert's death on Sunset Records SUS-5210 as Down to Earth)
- There's A Meetin' Here Tonite (1963 GNP 86)
- Coast to Coast (1964 GNP 96)
- Volume 4 (1964 GNP 99)
- Tear Down The Walls! (1965 GNP 2005)
- Live In Hollywood (1965 GNP 2007)
- Walkin' Down The Line (1965 GNP 2014)
- The Magic of Their Singing (1966 GNP 2021)
- The Best of Joe & Eddie (1967 GNP 2032); re-released in 1993 on CD (GNPPD 2032) with additional tracks
- The Gospel Truth, (compilation album) (GNPS 2052)
