= Hootenanny Hoot =

1963 film directed by Gene Nelson

- Directed by: Gene Nelson
- Produced by: Sam Katzman
- Starring: Peter Breck; Ruta Lee; Johnny Cash
- Cinematography: Ellis W. Carter
- Edited by: Al Clark
- Distributed by: MGM
- Release date: August 1963
- Running time: 91 minutes
- Country: United States
- Language: English
- Box office: $1,200,000 (US/ Canada)

Hootenanny Hoot is a 1963 folk music musical film directed by Gene Nelson. It stars Peter Breck and Ruta Lee.

== Plot ==
A TV director, having split up with his producer-wife, decides to telecast a traveling hootenanny show.

== Cast ==
- Peter Breck as Ted Grover
- Ruta Lee as A.G. Bannister
- Joby Baker as Steve Laughlin
- Pamela Austin as Billie-Jo Henley
- Bobo Lewis as Claudia Hoffer
- Lauren Gilbert as Howard Stauton
- Nick Novarro as Jed Morse

Musical acts:

- The Brothers Four
- Johnny Cash
- Chris Crosby
- George Hamilton IV
- Judy Henske
- Joe and Eddie
- Cathie Taylor
- Sheb Wooley
- The Gateway Trio

== Production ==
Ruta Lee signed in June 1963. Gene Nelson signed to direct.

The film was shot in nine days. Katzman was so pleased he gave Nelson the job directing Elvis Presley in Kissin' Cousins.

== Reception ==
The Los Angeles Times said the plot "wouldn't stand steady in a light breeze" but the filmmakers had "assembled a lively group of hootenany experts - and that's probably enough to ensure success."
