= Robin Hood (Disney character) =

- Robin Hood character
- Robin Hood, as seen in the 1973 film of the same name
- First appearance: Robin Hood; November 8, 1973
- Based on: Robin Hood; Reynard the Fox
- Voiced by: Brian Bedford (1973 film); Daniel Wolfe (Once Upon a Studio)

In-universe information
- Species: Red fox
- Gender: Male
- Spouse: Maid Marian
- Relatives: King Richard (uncle-in-law); Prince John (uncle-in-law)
- Origin: Nottingham
- Nationality: English

Robin Hood is a fictional character in Walt Disney Animation Studios' animated feature film Robin Hood (1973). Robin Hood is voiced by Shakespearean and Tony Award winning actor Brian Bedford. The film is based on the legends of Robin Hood and Reynard the fox, a 12th-century Alsatian fairy tale character, but uses anthropomorphic animals rather than people; in Robin's case being a red fox. The story follows the adventures of Robin Hood, Little John and the inhabitants of Nottingham as they fight against the excessive taxation of Prince John, and Robin Hood wins the hand of Maid Marian.

== In Robin Hood ==
Robin Hood is the titular protagonist of the film Robin Hood (1973). He does not see himself as a criminal but as a hero. Although Robin Hood is often shown as an outlaw who chooses to rob from the rich to help the poor people, in this animated version, he is shown mainly attacking Prince John and his agents, who have impoverished Nottingham with high taxes. Robin Hood and Little John rob the tax caravans and give the money back to the peasants while trying to avoid capture by both Prince John and the Sheriff of Nottingham. He is also in love with Maid Marian.

Early in the movie, Robin Hood enters the home of a rabbit family disguised as a blind beggar immediately after the Sheriff seizes a farthing from the eldest son Skippy, who had just received it as a birthday present. After the Sheriff leaves (taking Robin's "alms" on his way out), Robin removes his disguise and gives Skippy a small bow, an arrow, and his hat as birthday gifts, and gives a small bag of money to his mother Mrs. Rabbit, responding to her thanks by saying he wished he could give more.

Maid Marian reveals she and Robin were childhood sweethearts but they have not seen one another for years. Prince John is hosting an archery tournament, and the winner will receive a kiss from Maid Marian. Robin decides to participate in the tournament disguised as a stork whilst Little John disguises himself as the Duke of Chutney to get near Prince John. Robin wins the tournament, but Prince John exposes him and sentences him to death despite Maid Marian's pleas. However, thanks to Little John, Robin escapes into the woods with Marian. As Robin and Maid Marian enjoy their reunion, the townsfolk have a troubadour festival spoofing Prince John, describing him as the "Phony King of England." The song soon becomes popular with John's soldiers, but John, enraged, demands that the denizens of Nottingham have their taxes tripled, and that anyone unable to pay those taxes be imprisoned.

When the Sheriff seizes the only coin left in the church's poor box, Friar Tuck lashes out and attacks him, and is consequently arrested for treason. Prince John orders Friar Tuck hanged, knowing Robin Hood will come out of hiding to rescue his friend. Robin and Little John sneak in, and Little John frees all of the prisoners whilst Robin steals Prince John's taxes, but Sir Hiss awakens to find Robin fleeing. Chaos ensues as Robin and the others try to escape to Sherwood Forest. The Sheriff corners Robin after he returns to rescue Skippy's younger sister Tagalong, who was nearly left behind. During the chase, Prince John's castle catches fire and the Sheriff figures he has Robin where he wants him, either to be captured, burned, or make a risky jump into the moat. Robin Hood elects to jump. Little John and Skippy fear Robin is lost, but he surfaces safely after using a reed as a breathing tube.

Later, King Richard returns to England, placing his brother, Sir Hiss and the Sheriff under arrest and allows his niece Maid Marian to marry Robin Hood, turning the former outlaw into an in-law.

=== Inspiration for the character ===
Medieval historian Andrew E. Larsen wrote that the inspiration for Disney's animated Robin Hood character was not actually the Robin Hood of literary and cinematic fame but instead was Reynard the fox, a 12th century Alsatian fairy tale character. Larsen drew parallels between many of the characters from the animated film and characters in the Reynard tales, including the lion King Leo and the rooster Chaunticleer. Disney was able to overcome concerns about Reynard being a crook and anti-authoritarian figure by turning him into the bandit Robin Hood.

=== Characteristics and physical appearance ===
==== Characteristics ====
Robin Hood is a heroic outlaw who steals from the rich and gives to the poor. He is known for his mastery of archery as well as his talent for disguising himself. Despite being declared an outlaw, Robin Hood is a good and generous person at heart, and is beloved by the townspeople for his deeds.

==== Physical appearance ====
Robin Hood is a slender red fox with brown eyes who wears a yellow or green hat with a red feather on it, and wears green clothing and shoes.

=== Voice actor ===
Tony Award-winning stage and Shakespearean actor Brian Bedford provided the voice of Robin Hood. His voicing was acclaimed for giving "...the titular fox a pleasant blend of mischief and gracious dignity."

=== Popular reception ===
Cosmopolitan called Robin Hood "the sexiest animated fox ever to appear on screen". Hollywood writer James Humphreys writing on his web site Cineramble discussed the evolution of Robin Hood in Cinema, and described the animated Robin Hood as a "...clear sign of just how universally effective Robin Hood is as a big screen hero."

== Other appearances ==
=== Film and television ===
- Robin Hood has recurring cameo appearances in the television series House of Mouse as a guest of the titular club.
- Robin Hood appears in the short film Once Upon a Studio, voiced by Daniel Wolfe.

=== Theme parks ===
Robin Hood is a meet-and-greet character at Disney Parks, where he occasionally appears in Fantasyland alongside Little John and Maid Marian.

=== Video games ===
- Robin Hood appears as a costume for the player in Disney Universe.
- Robin Hood appears as a townspeople costume in Disney Infinity.
- Robin Hood appears as a playable character in Disney Magic Kingdoms.
- Robin Hood appears as a playable character in Disney Heroes: Battle Mode.

== See also ==
- List of films and television series featuring Robin Hood
