= The School for Husbands =

Play written by Molière

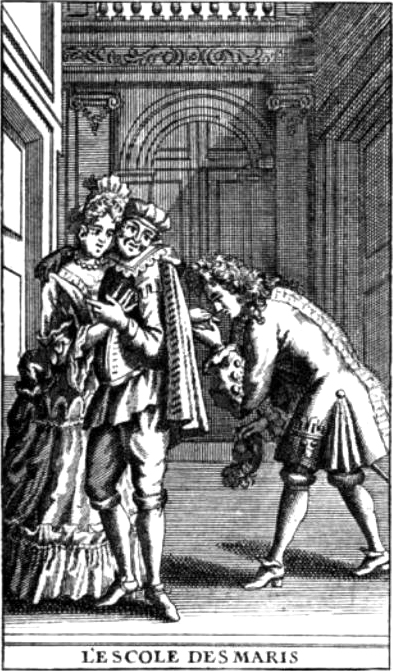
- The School for Husbands
- Original language: French
- Written by: Molière

Premiere
- Date: 1661

The School for Husbands is a play written by Molière and originally performed in 1661 in Paris. Inspired by the Adelphoe of Terence, it was the first of his full length plays, preceding The School for Wives by a year. The plot centers on the suitors of two sisters, each of whom is a ward of each of the two men. One suitor, Sganarelle, is controlling and overbearing of his intended wife Isabella. The other suitor, Sganarelle's older brother Ariste, treats his intended wife Léonor more as an equal. Ariste eventually finds success in his pursued relationship, while Sganarelle fails miserably, so much so, in fact, that he is unwittingly used by Isabella in seeking her preferred courter, Valère.

== Characters ==
- Sganarelle, 40 years old
- Ariste, 60 years old and Sganarelle's older brother
- Valère, in love with Isabella
- Ergaste, Valère's valet
- A Magistrate
- A Notary
- Isabella, in ward to Sganarelle
- Léonor, Isabella's sister, in ward to Ariste
- Lisette, Leonor's maidservant

== Audio Recordings ==
An hour-long version adapted by Lawrence Langner was broadcast on the NBC radio series Great Plays on April 2, 1938.

The L.A. Theatre Works released a production in 2010 (ISBN 1-58081-773-4) on a double bill with The Imaginary Cuckold, both productions using translations by Richard Wilbur and featuring Brian Bedford, Juliet Mills, Christopher Neame, Moira Quirk and Joanne Whalley.
