= When No One Would Listen =

1992 true crime drama made-for-TV film

- British VHS artwork
- Genre: Drama
- Written by: Cindy Myers
- Directed by: Armand Mastroianni
- Starring: Michele Lee; James Farentino; John Spencer; Lee Garlington; Ellen Crawford
- Music by: Arthur B. Rubinstein
- Country of origin: United States
- Original language: English

Production
- Executive producer: Michele Lee
- Production location: United States
- Cinematography: Richard M. Rawlings Jr.
- Editor: Daniel Cahn
- Running time: 1 hour, 31 minutes
- Production companies: Bruce Sallan Productions; Michele Lee Productions; Papazian-Hirsch Entertainment International

Original release
- Network: CBS; LMN
- Release: November 15, 1992 (CBS)

When No One Would Listen is a 1992 American made-for-television drama film, telling the story of housewife Jessica Cochran (Michele Lee), and the domestic violence she faces from her controlling, mentally unstable husband Gary Cochran (James Farentino). The film featured main actress Michele Lee as the executive producer. When No One Would Listen is set in Glen Oaks, Queens, although the case it is based upon occurred elsewhere.

== Background ==
When No One Would Listen is loosely based on David Guenther, also known as the "Make My Day Killer" due to the shooting of his neighbours in what he claimed was self-defence against their trespassing. Guenther had been the first person to invoke the State of Colorado's "Make My Day" law, which allows residents to use deadly force in their homes against intruders. Guenther later shot and murdered his estranged wife Pamela (age 30), and severely injured her boyfriend, Stanley Stinson, who survived. The Guenthers' two children, Christopher (age 13), and Jennifer (age 11), saw the shootings and were key prosecution witnesses along with Stinson. Names and places in When No One Would Listen were changed to protect remaining witnesses and the Guenther children.

== Plot ==
Timid housewife Jessica Cochran has been married to her controlling husband Gary for years. She began dating him at the age of fifteen and has two children, daughter Maggie and son Pete. Gary had hit Jessica and threatened to kill her early-on in their relationship, although he has never hit the children. Both children are aware that Gary beats their mother, but they feel powerless to stop the abuse.

After some career trouble, Gary moves the family out to the New York suburb of Glen Oaks. At first, Gary seems like a sweet and loving husband, but after getting mad at some hippie neighbours who enjoy smoking marijuana, drinking alcohol and partying, he becomes obsessed with these neighbours, constantly reporting them to the police for petty reasons. Unemployed, Gary takes out his anger on Jessica. He attempts to cover up his inability to secure a new job by buying Maggie and Pete a VCR and a VHS tape of Disney's The Little Mermaid, but then begins verbally attacking Jessica and his neighbours when Jessica asks him if he got a new job. Jessica takes up a part-time job at a bakery to help make ends meet; there she meets a new friend named Lee, who makes pottery as a hobby and shares some cigarettes with Jessica while they laugh at risque sex jokes. Lee declares that she "likes [Jessica's] buns!" (referring to Jessica's sourdough buns from the bakery), after which Jessica quips back, "well, I like your jugs!" (referring to Lee's pottery). Jessica also befriends her new boss, Walter, and becomes close with him. Meanwhile, Gary criticizes Jessica for wearing a knee-length skirt to work, telling her that she has fat legs.

Lee and Walter begin to notice bruises on Jessica's body, and urge her to divorce Gary and flee with the children. One night, during a particularly loud house party, a hippie stumbles drunk up to the Cochran home and repeatedly knocks on the door, making annoying noises. Gary responds by shooting and killing the hippie's pregnant wife, which horrifies Jessica. Gary is released from jail after claiming that the neighbours were trespassing on his private property, and arguing that the shooting was in self-defence. Meanwhile, while trying to teach Pete how to fight back against some local school bullies, he violently punches Pete in the stomach, causing the boy to collapse on the floor. Jessica catches Pete that night applying ice cubes from the kitchen freezer onto a large bruise up one side of his body. Realizing that Gary is beginning to beat the children, she sneaks out of the home and spends the night with Walter. She begins dating Walter, although Lee advises Jessica to go underground to a women's shelter because of Gary's murderous history.

Gary becomes more and more unhinged, attempting at one point to force Maggie and Pete into his car so he can abduct them. Walter and Jessica are able to pull the children away from him and rescue them. Lee takes Jessica to the police for a restraining order, but the issuing judge warns Jessica that a restraining order is merely a piece of paper, with no power to physically stop Gary from coming back. Gary lures Jessica back into the Cochran home and holds her hostage, forcing her to put on skimpy black lingerie while he proceeds to rape her. The next morning, a SWAT team arrives and a hostage negotiator is able to convince Gary to let Jessica free. Despite Gary's actions, he is once again kept out of jail.

Jessica moves into a women's shelter for the sake of Maggie and Pete, both of whom make friends at the shelter and begin resuming normal childhood activities, like drawing pictures. Jessica continues dating Walter, and they decide one evening to take the children to a diner for supper, in the hopes that it will be a fun activity to distract themselves from Gary. Unbeknownst to them, Gary has found the women's shelter and is following Jessica in his car. Jessica, Walter and the children eat a meal together while Gary watches from outside. Upon exiting the diner, Jessica and Walter share a kiss, infuriating Gary, who steps out of his hiding place and shoots Jessica and Walter with a revolver. An ending scene reveals that the real "Jessica Cochran" was mortally wounded by the gunshots and died, while the real "Walter Wheeler" recovered from his injuries and testified against Gary in court. It is revealed that the real "Maggie" and "Pete" Cochran (Christopher and Jennifer Guenther) were taken in by their grandparents after the killing of their mother.

== Cast ==
- Michele Lee as Jessica Cochran
- James Farentino as Gary Cochran
- John Spencer as Walter Wheeler
- Lee Garlington as Lee
- Anndi McAfee as Maggie Cochran
- Damion Stevens as Pete Cochran
- Ellen Crawford as Judge Beckerman
- Cicely Tyson as Sarah
- Vincent Dale as Young officer

== Production ==
When No One Would Listen was directed by Armand Mastroianni. Arthur B. Rubinstein composed the music. Bruce Sallan Productions, Michele Lee Productions, Papazian-Hirsch Entertainment, and Canal Plus produced the film. It was filmed in Los Angeles with Richard Rawlings as the director of photography. Daniel Cahn handled editing, with Hal Whitby on sound. Lisa Smithline designed the production and Cindy Myers wrote the screenplay.

When attempting to market the film, Lee and Farentino ran into difficulty in obtaining the typical talk show coverage. Suzanne de Passe had just produced The Jacksons: An American Dream, which aired on ABC in the same November 15, 1992 time slot; her friendship with Oprah Winfrey precluded Lee and Farentino appearing on Winfrey's show. Phil Donahue's 25th Anniversary episode also aired at the same time on NBC. The producers of the Donahue special also produced Sally, and they canceled the interview that Lee and Farentino had scheduled with Sally Jessy Raphael.

== Themes ==
When No One Would Listen included themes of domestic violence as well as a critique of the failings of the U.S. justice system. It also explores the reasons some women may feel safer staying in a domestic violence situation than leaving.

The violence depicted in the film resulted in its inclusion on a list of "the most violent films" in the 1992 fall television season presented in the United States Senate Committee on the Judiciary in May and June 1993. Peter Tortorici, then executive vice president of CBS Entertainment, testified before the United States House Committee on Energy and Commerce on July 1, 1993 that the violence was necessary to the purpose of the film.

== Release ==
When No One Would Listen premiered on CBS on November 15, 1992 as the movie of the week. It aired on CBS again on June 29, 1993. The film aired on Lifetime in 2003.

== Reception ==
=== Critical reception ===
When No One Would Listen received mixed reviews from critics.

Richard Huff of Variety praised Spencer's acting. Huff was also impressed with the choice to have Lee and Farentino address the camera directly to ensnare viewers, as well as the decision to limit the violence shown on screen. Huff found the writing alternately "moving" and "sappy". Ray Loynd of the Los Angeles Times found Lee's and Farentino's performances to be career bests. Loynd also noted that the decision to have them address the camera distinguishes this production from a story that Loynd stated had been done too often. Loynd commented that the direct address helped to remove the viewer from the events. Loynd also praised Mastroianni's direction.

Scott Pierce of the Deseret News, however, found the characters addressing the camera "annoying" and "jarring." Pierce also found the casting of Lee and Farentino, ex-spouses, awkward, and said it was the most notable thing about the film. Pierce added that he found the violence to be "quite graphic for television."

Steven H. Scheuer, as published in the Observer–Reporter, rated the film three of four stars prior to its premiere in 1992, praising Spencer's performance in particular. In 1993, the rating increased to three and a half stars.

=== Retrospective reviews ===
Mental health information directory Therapy Route praised the film for its accurate portrayal of domestic abuse, adding When No One Would Listen to its "Movies about domestic violence and abuse - Mental Health Related Films" list.

=== Audience reception ===
Nielsen ratings showed the overnight numbers for the film at 12.0/17 in the 9-11 PM time slot for November 15, 1992. The movie ranked at number 29 in the ratings for November 9-15. The average rating compiled for November 12-18 showed 12.9/21. The week of June 28 to July 4, 1993, the program had a rating of 12.8 and a 22 share, ranking at number five as the "Tuesday Night Movie".

=== Accolades ===
The film was nominated for three different awards, including a Young Artist Award for Best Actress in a Television Movie (for Anndi McAfee in the role of Maggie Cochran).
