= Celia Kaye =

American actress (b. 1942)

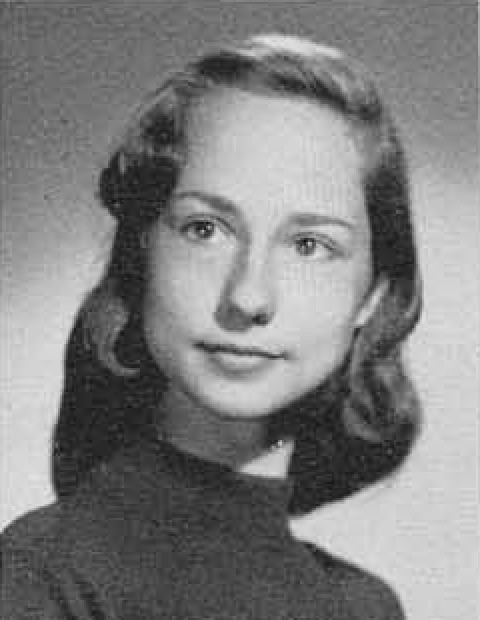
- Senior yearbook photo
- Born: Celia Kay Burkholder; February 24, 1942 (age 84); Carthage, Missouri, US
- Other name: Celia Milius
- Years active: 1962–2025
- Spouse: John Milius (m. 1978, divorced)
- Children: 1

Celia Kaye (born Celia Kay Burkholder; February 24, 1942) is an American actress. She starred in the 1964 film adaptation of Island of the Blue Dolphins which won her a Golden Globe award.

== Early life ==
Kaye is of German and Cherokee descent and was born in Carthage, Missouri, to chemical engineer John W. Burkholder and his wife, Kathryn, who ran a private preschool. When she was one year old her family moved to Wilmington, Delaware, where her younger brother Johnny was born. She graduated with honors from Henry C. Conrad High School. In addition to her performing arts interests, which included learning dance and organ, she toured regionally as a diver and exhibition swimmer with the Wilmington swim club. She also worked as a model and is a graduate of the Philadelphia Modeling and Charm School.

== Career ==
In 1959, Kaye moved to California, where she won a scholarship to the Pasadena Playhouse, graduating in 1961. She soon moved from the stage to television with a major role in the sitcom The New Loretta Young Show. Her role on this show, as Loretta Young's daughter, Marnie, almost didn't happen as the role was originally cast with Portland Mason who was later fired. While working on the show she continued her education, attending Los Angeles City College at night and studying modern jazz at Eugene Loring's American School of Dance.

Kaye became a movie star when she landed the lead role of Karana in the 1964 movie Island of the Blue Dolphins, based on the book of the same name. There were originally 1,500 applicants for the role she was ultimately chosen for. Although her Cherokee heritage wasn't known by the producer at the time she was cast, the press for the movie played it up, drawing attention to the fact that she looked "like an Indian with her dark hair and skin".

When filming was done, Kaye remained and followed along with the post-production of her first feature film. Before her first movie was even released, she filmed two more projects for Universal Pictures as part of a seven year contract: Wild Seed and Fluffy.

Following the release of Island of the Blue Dolphins, she was awarded the Golden Globe Award for Most Promising Newcomer in 1965, alongside Mia Farrow and Mary Ann Mobley. The movie itself received generally positive reviews as an entertaining but simplistic children's movie although her performance received more mixed reviews. Stanley Eichelbaum of the San Francisco Examiner called her performance two-dimensional, while Mae Tinee of the Chicago Tribune wrote that she "handles a difficult role with grace and ease."

Over the next few years, she appeared in a number of additional movies, television shows, and plays. She attended UCLA in the evenings, studying anthropology and social sciences. After the 1960s her roles became less frequent and smaller, including being a look-alike extra for Merle Oberon on The Day of The Locust. By 1978 she was referred to as a "former actress", although she has continued to have occasional roles.

== Personal life ==
Kaye married director John Milius on February 26, 1978. They had one child together and remain friends, although they were divorced by 1987.

== Filmography ==
=== Television ===
Year	Series	Role	Notes	Ref(s)
1962	Tales of Wells Fargo	Julie Trenton	Episode: "The Traveler"	
1962–1963	The New Loretta Young Show	Marnie Massey	16 episodes	
1963	The Adventures of Ozzie and Harriet	Celia / Pledge	1 episode each	
1964	Wagon Train	Ann Shelby	Episode: "The Clay Shelby Story"	
1965	The John Forsythe Show	Connie	1 episode	
1967	The Green Hornet	Melissa Neal	2 episodes	
1967	Iron Horse	Emily	Episode: "Decision at Sundown"	
1967	Insight	Jenny	Episode: "All the Little Plumes in Pain"	
1970	The Young Lawyers	Helen Nudavik	Episode: "Where's Aaron"	
1973	Adam's Rib	Francis	Episode: "Illegal Aid"	
1973	Don't Be Afraid of the Dark	Anne	TV movie	
1974	Little House on the Prairie	Willa Sweeney	Episode: "100 Mile Walk"	
1975	Police Story	Sabina	Episode: "The Cutting Edge"	
2015	CLASS	Rose	Credited as Celia Milius	
2019	Holey Moley	Herself	Episode: "An Outbreak of Ginger Fever"	

=== Film ===
Year	Film	Role	Notes	Ref(s)
1964	Island of the Blue Dolphins	Karana	Golden Globe Award for New Star of the Year – Actress	
1965	Wild Seed	Daphne "Daffy"		
1965	Fluffy	Sally Brighton		
1972	The Final Comedown	Renee Freeman		
1976	Rattlers	Woman in Bathtub		
1978	Big Wednesday	Bride of the Bear		
1982	Conan the Barbarian	High Priestess	Uncredited	
1988	Vampire at Midnight	Sandra		
2014	V/H/S: Viral	Grandma	Credited as Celia K. Milius	
2015	The Lotus Gun	N/A	Associate Producer; credited as Celia Milius	
