= The Pad (and How to Use It) =

1966 film by Brian G. Hutton

- Directed by: Brian G. Hutton
- Screenplay by: Thomas C. Ryan; Ben Starr
- Based on: The Private Ear (play) by Peter Shaffer
- Produced by: Ross Hunter
- Starring: Brian Bedford; Julie Sommars; James Farentino
- Cinematography: Ellsworth Fredericks
- Edited by: Milton Carruth
- Music by: Russell Garcia
- Production company: Ross Hunter Productions
- Distributed by: Universal Pictures
- Release date: August 17, 1966 (New York City)
- Running time: 86 minutes
- Country: United States
- Language: English
- Budget: $300,000

The Pad (and How to Use It) is a 1966 comedy film directed by Brian G. Hutton and starring Brian Bedford, Julie Sommars and James Farentino. It was written by Thomas C. Ryan and Ben Starr, based on the 1962 one-act play The Private Ear by Peter Shaffer.

== Plot ==
A sensitive man named Bob Handman, who lives alone in his apartment, encounters whom he believes to be his ideal woman, Doreen at a classical-music concert. They arrange to meet at a later date at his pad. Because he is so unworldly, he asks his best friend Ted along to the date for moral support. It transpires that she only went to the classical concert because she was given a free ticket by a co-worker. She has no interest in classical music, which is Bob's passion, but she is charmed by Ted, who prepares the evening meal and flirts with her outrageously while Bob gets drunk.

Bob and Ted fall out and Doreen goes off with Ted. The movie ends with Bob sitting in a darkened room, listening to the aria from Madame Butterfly. He gets up and drags the phonograph needle across the record several times, placing the needle back on the record. As he sits in the dark crying, the record skips repeatedly over the scratched aria.

== Cast ==
- Brian Bedford as Bob Handman
- Julie Sommars as Doreen Marshall
- James Farentino as Ted
- Edy Williams as Lavinia
- Nick Navarro as beatnik
- Pearl Shear as fat woman
- Barbara London as waitress
- Barbara Reid as girl on the phone
- Roger Bacon as Larry
- Don Conreaux as Ralph

== Production ==
In October 1965 producer Ross Hunter announced he wanted to use unknown stars and director, and the writer Tom Ryan had not done a script before.

== Reception ==
Variety wrote: "Ross Hunter's screen adaptation, thanks almost entirely to Shaffer's original dialog and the recreation by Brian Bedford of the shy young man he played in the New York production, recaptures much of the humor, compassion and wisdom of the legit production."

Boxoffice wrote: "Ross Hunter, whose multi-starred, glamorous and lavishly appointed comedies for Universal have all been blockbusters, does an about-face with this simple tale about three middleclass folk, acted by a trio of comparative newcomers, and creates a gem of a motion picture, one which should win critical praise and build on favorable word-of-mouth."

Time wrote: "The title swings like a rusty tailpipe, but stay cool. Ross Hunter, the Hollywood production genius who gave the world Tammy and a yock-pile of fill’ems starring Rock Hudson and Doris Day, has actually produced an intelligent picture at last."
