= Nick Navarro (dancer) =

Mexican-American dancer and choreographer (b.1938)

Nick Novarro
- Born: Nicholas Bala Covacevich; January 11, 1938 (age 88); Mexico City, Mexico
- Known for: Dance and choreography
- Movement: Modern/contemporary dance
- Spouse(s): Leona Gage (1958-1961) Dagmar Wrede (1964-pre-1968); Jacqueline Marie-France Douguet (1968 - 1969); Mary Lucezia Lapenta (1973 - 1998) Reiko Carol Bright (2000 - 2021)
- Children: Nicholas Anthony (1959); Mario (1976); Ophelia (1979); Brianna (1983)

Nicholas Bala Covacevich (born January 11, 1938), known professionally as Nick Navarro (and earlier credited as Nick Covacevich and Nick Novarro) is a Mexican-American former dancer and choreographer known for his work in both stage and film productions. As a performer, he was best known in the 1960s with prominent film roles in West Side Story and Hootenanny Hoot, and danced alongside Marilyn Monroe and Sandra Dee. His later work as a choreographer was most closely associated with Las Vegas shows.

== Early life ==
Navarro was born in Mexico City, Mexico, in 1938 to Tomás Covacevich (1899 to 1976) and Guadalupe Bala (1909 to 1997). He was the third of their three sons, his two older brothers being Roberto and Jorge. He also had an older half-sister, Maria Esperanza, from his father's first marriage. His father worked on the Mexican railway when Navarro was a child. The family moved to Houston, Texas in 1946 when Navarro was eight and when he was 15, the family moved to Los Angeles. Navarro began dancing in schools at the age of 17 and received a scholarship to continue his study and joined the Lester Horton dancers.

Although Navarro's family name, Covacevich, is Yugoslavian in origin, his paternal grandparents, Jesús Covacevich and Delfina Gastélum were both born in Mexico in the 1870s. On his maternal side, all of his great-grandparents were from Mexico.

== Career ==
Navarro became a professional with the Lester Horton Dancers and worked in a number of venues among which was the Moulin Rouge night club in Los Angeles (where he met his future wife, Leona Gage, in 1958). Navarro was later signed for a Fred Astaire television show. When the one-year contract on that show expired, he joined Juliet Prowse whom he had been teaching dance, and toured with her for 18 months.

At the end of the Prowse tour, Navarro auditioned for the film version of West Side Story. He later recalled that there were "Hundreds of dudes, all sizes and shapes". The winnowing-out process involved five or more follow-up calls. Of the over 150 who auditioned in Los Angeles, Navarro was one of three that got a part and his was to be both a dancing and a speaking role as one of the Sharks, Toro.

Before performing in West Side Story, Navarro had had a chorus role in the Marilyn Monroe film Let's Make Love (alongside Robert Banas, another West Side Story dancer). However, the success of West Side Story opened up a number of opportunities in film including a dual role in Take Her, She's Mine alongside Sandra Dee, where he played both a French lover and an Apache dancer. He then landed the role as Jed Morse alongside Pamela Austin in Hootenanny Hoot in 1963. At this time, he was regarded as one of the nations top young dancers. Whilst performing in Hootenanny Hoot, Navarro assisted choreographer Hal Belfer in working out many of the steps in the new dance being promoted by the movie (at the time hoping to "nudge the Twist and Bossa Nova to one side").

Navarro had by this time changed his stage name from Covacevich to Novarro. When interviewed during the promotional tour of Hootenanny Hoot, he said that Novarro was a family name that he had decided to use because Covacevich was too hard to pronounce.

Navarro danced in the film adaptation of My Fair Lady and as Nick Novarro, he had a major role in Scream of the Butterfly in 1965 alongside Nelida Lobato. He also had 1966 roles in The Swinger and The Pad (and How to Use It), a film that earned James Farentino a Golden Globe for most promising newcomer.

His live performance career continued alongside these major forays into movies. After his final promotion stop for Hootenanny Hoot, he flew straight to Hot Springs, Arkansas to open Juliet Prowse's night club act there. He also later costarred with Mamie Van Doren in the show Ziegfeld Follies at the Thunderbird Hotel.

Throughout the early sixties Novarro was also a dance teacher and worked with notable students, including some he would support or co-star with such as Juliet Prowse, Pamela Austin, Pamela Mason, and Vera-Ellen.

Navarro then turned his energy to choreography and ran the successful Nick Navarro Dancers group. As well as Las Vegas shows he also choreographed the 1974 Annual Las Vegas Entertainment Awards. He then spent time in the south of France and Monte Carlo. In 1977 he was based at Le Ruhl Casino in Nice where he choreographed a well received show Happy Broadway to You

In the 1980s he continued to choreograph internationally, as well as in Las Vegas, and also had some Television credits such as Kandyland in 1987. Other TV credits in the early 1990s included Delusion in 1991 and La Toya Jackson's Playboy Celebrity Centerfold in 1994. He was also engaged as choreographer for productions on cruise ships (such as the Royal Caribbean's Sovereign of the Seas).

In 2000, Navarro choreographed the renowned Splash at the Riviera, Las Vegas in 2000

== Personal life ==
In October 1958, whilst performing in the Moulin Rouge night club in Los Angeles, he met fellow performer and former Miss USA 1957, Leona Gage. Within four weeks they announced their engagement, and were married that year. They had one son together, Nicholas Anthony, but their short marriage was beset by fighting and they divorced in 1961. In August 1963, Navarro won custody of his son from Gage.

Navarro then had a two-year relationship with Juliet Prowse following her break-up with Frank Sinatra. There were rumours that Navarro and Prowse had secretly married, but these were firmly denied by Prowse.

After his relationship with Prowse, Navarro met Dagmar Wrede, a Swedish ex-ballerina and Las Vegas showgirl(although sometimes reported as hailing from Germany) and married her in 1964. The marriage to Wrede was short-lived, and in 1968 he married Jacqueline Douguet. However, this ended in divorce a year later.

Navarro then married Mary Lucrezia Lapenta in 1973 to whom he would be married for 25 years before divorcing in 1998. They had three children, Mario, Ophelia and Brianna.

In August 2000, Navarro married Reiko Bright. They divorced in 2021.

== Productions ==
=== Film ===
- The I Don't Care Girl (1953), Dancer (uncredited)
- West Side Story (1961 film) - Toro, member of the Sharks
- Let's Make Love (1961), Chorus Boy (uncredited)
- Calypso Joe (1962)
- Hootenanny Hoot (1963) – Jed Morse (credited as Nic Novarro)
- Take Her, She's Mine (1963) - dancer
- My Fair Lady (1964) – Dancer (uncredited)
- Scream of the Butterfly (1965) – David (credited as Nic Novarro)
- The Swinger (1966) – Bearded Bitnik (uncredited)
- The Pad (and How to Use It) (1966) – Beatnik

==== Television ====
- Appeared on The Fred Astaire TV Spectacular, as well as the shows of Andy Williams, Bob Hope, and Danny Kaye (by 1963).
- Mona McCluskey (1966) – The Beard

=== Choreography ===
==== Film and Video ====
- Playboy Celebrity Centerfold: La Toya Jackson (1994) – Choreographer (credited as Nick Covacevich)
- Delusion (1991) – Choreographer
- Kandyland (1987) – Choreographer

==== Television ====
- The 1974 Annual Las Vegas Entertainment Awards (1974) – Choreographer
