= Stella Farentino =

Canadian-American actress

- Occupation: Actress
- Spouse: James Farentino (m. 1994; died 2012)

Stella Farentino is the fourth wife of actor James Farentino. She became an actress after their marriage.

== Personal life ==
She was married to James Farentino from August 3, 1994, until his death on January 24, 2012. She filed for divorce in 1998 due to "irreconcilable differences," but later withdrew her petition. Farentino later filed for divorce in January 2001 also due to "irreconcilable differences" but it was likewise withdrawn.

== Career ==
Three years after marrying actor James Farentino, Stella Farentino appeared in a minor role in the direct-to-video release In Search of a Woman (1997). She went on to appear in ten minor credited roles, in television episodes and direct-to-video releases, over an eighteen-years period.

She may be remembered for an appearance on the series Everybody Loves Raymond, as "Anna Barone," the representative of a Barone family in Italy, in the 1998 episode "Mia Famiglia".
