= James Farentino =

American actor (1938–2012)

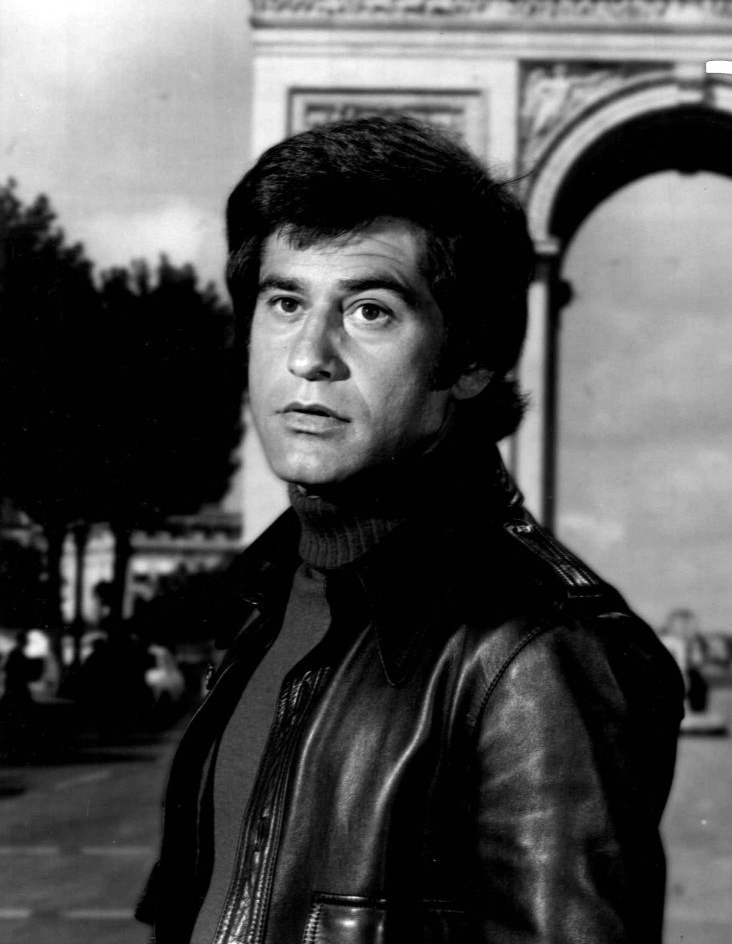
- Farentino in Cool Million in 1972
- Born: Fred Ferrentino; February 24, 1938; Brooklyn, New York, U.S.
- Died: January 24, 2012 (aged 73); Los Angeles, California, U.S.
- Years active: 1962–2006
- Spouses: Elizabeth Ashley (m. 1962; div. 1965); Michele Lee (m. 1966; div. 1983); Debrah Mullowney (m. 1985; div. 1988); Stella Farentino (m. 1994)
- Children: 1

James Farentino (February 24, 1938 – January 24, 2012) was an American actor. He appeared in television, film, and on stage, including The Final Countdown, Jesus of Nazareth, and Dynasty.

== Career ==
Born in Brooklyn, Farentino attended local schools followed later by studying drama and acting in Catholic school.

In the 1950s and 1960s, he performed on the stage and a few TV roles. He starred in The Alfred Hitchcock Hour alongside Vera Miles and John Carradine (episode "Death Scene"). He garnered a Golden Globe Award for Best Male Newcomer for the film, The Pad (and How to Use It) (1966).

In 1969, he starred opposite Patty Duke in the film Me, Natalie. Farentino was one of the lawyers in NBC's TV series The Bold Ones (1969–1972), which also starred Burl Ives and Joseph Campanella. He made two appearances in the 1970s anthology television series Night Gallery, once with then-wife Michele Lee ("Since Aunt Ada Came to Stay"), and next with actress Joanna Pettet ("The Girl with the Hungry Eyes"). Also in 1970, Farentino appeared as Pick Lexington in The Men from Shiloh (the repackaged name of the popular long-running TV Western The Virginian) in the episode titled "The Best Man". In 1973, he appeared in the episode "The Soft, Kind Brush" of the romantic anthology series Love Story. In 1972-1973, he starred in NBC's Cool Million.

In 1978, he was nominated for a Primetime Emmy Award for Outstanding Supporting Actor in a Limited Series or Movie for his portrayal of Simon Peter in the miniseries Jesus of Nazareth. In 1980, Farentino starred in The Final Countdown with Kirk Douglas and Martin Sheen, and then played Juan Perón opposite Faye Dunaway's Eva Perón in the 1981 television film Evita Perón. Farentino appeared as Frank Chaney in the short-lived 1984 ABC series Blue Thunder, based on the 1983 film of the same name, starring Roy Scheider. He starred as Dr. Nick Toscanni on the second season of Dynasty from 1981 to 1982. In the late 1990s, he appeared as the estranged father of lead character Doug Ross on ER.

== Personal life ==
In 1962, Farentino married Elizabeth Ashley. The couple divorced in 1965. He was married to Michele Lee from 1966 to 1982. Farentino and Lee had a son, David in 1969. Farentino and Deborah Mullowney married in 1985 and divorced in 1988. He married Stella Farentino in 1994.

Farentino was charged with stalking Tina Sinatra in 1993. A restraining order was issued against him after he entered a plea of nolo contendere.

Farentino was arrested in Vancouver, British Columbia, on July 23, 1991, after Canada Customs intercepted a package containing 3.2 g of cocaine being sent to his hotel room. He was charged with cocaine possession and released on bail.

In 2010, Farentino was arrested on suspicion of misdemeanor battery after a man alleged Farentino assaulted him when the actor tried to remove the man from his home.

== Death ==
Farentino died at age 73 on January 24, 2012, at Cedars-Sinai Medical Center in Los Angeles from sequelae, following a broken hip. Contributing factors to his death were diabetes, hypertensive arteriosclerotic cardiopulmonary disease and chronic obstructive pulmonary disease.

== Selected filmography ==
- The Alfred Hitchcock Hour (1962) (Season 1 Episode 9: "The Black Curtain") - Bernie
- Violent Midnight (1963) - Charlie Perone
- Ensign Pulver (1964) - Insigna
- The Alfred Hitchcock Hour (1965) (Season 3 Episode 20: "Death Scene") - Leo Manfred
- The War Lord (1965) - Marc
- The Pad and How to Use It (1966) - Ted
- The Ride to Hangman's Tree (1967) - Matt Stone
- Banning (1967) - Chris Patton
- Rosie! (1967) - David Wheelright
- Me, Natalie (1969) - David Harris
- Story of a Woman (1970) - Bruno Cardini
- The Longest Night (1972, TV movie) - John Danbury
- The Elevator (1974, TV movie) - Eddie Holcomb
- Jesus of Nazareth (1977, TV miniseries) - Simon Peter
- The Possessed (1977, TV movie) - Kevin Leahy
- The Final Countdown (1980) - Cdr. Richard Owens / Mr.Tideman
- Evita Perón (1981, TV movie) - Juan Perón
- Dead & Buried (1981) - Sheriff Dan Gillis
- Dynasty (1982–1983) - Dr. Nick Toscanni
- License to Kill (1984, TV movie) - John Peterson
- Blue Thunder (TV series) (1984, TV movie) - Frank Chaney
- Mary (1985) - Frank DeMarco
- Rand McNally's Hawaii VideoTrip (1986, hosted)
- Sins (miniseries) (1986) - David Westfield
- Naked Lie (1989) - Jonathan Morris
- Her Alibi (1989) - Frank Polito
- When No One Would Listen (1992) - Gary Cochran
- Deep Down (1994) - Joey
- Honor Thy Father and Mother: The True Story of the Menendez Murders (1994) - José Menendez
- Bulletproof (1996) - Capt. Jensen
- Termination Man (1998) - Cain
- The Last Producer (2000) - Poker Player
- Women of the Night (2001) - Sabatini
- Drive/II (2006) - Benjamin
