= Brian Bedford =

English actor (1935–2016)

- Bedford in 2011
- Born: 16 February 1935; Morley, West Riding of Yorkshire, England
- Died: 13 January 2016 (aged 80); Santa Barbara, California, U.S.
- Education: Royal Academy of Dramatic Art
- Occupation: Actor
- Years active: 1955–2015
- Spouse: Tim MacDonald (m. 2013)

Brian Bedford (16 February 1935 – 13 January 2016) was an English actor. Known for his work on stage and screen, he was an actor and director in various Shakespearian productions. Bedford was nominated for seven Tony Awards for his theatrical work, winning once.

He served as the voice of Disney's Robin Hood from the 1973 animated film of the same name.

== Early life ==
Brian Bedford was born in Morley, West Riding of Yorkshire, on 16 February 1935, the son of Irish Catholic parents Ellen (née O'Donnell) and Arthur Bedford, a postman. He attended St Bede's Grammar School in Bradford, leaving at the age of 15. He attended the Royal Academy of Dramatic Art in London from 1952 to 1955. At RADA, he was in the same class as Albert Finney, Alan Bates and Peter O'Toole.

== Career ==
Primarily a stage actor, he appeared in English-speaking interpretations of the French playwright Molière, including Tony Award nominated performances in Tartuffe, The Molière Comedies (a double bill of the short plays The School for Husbands and The Imaginary Cuckold) and The School for Wives, for which he received the Tony Award for Best Performance by a Leading Actor in a Play.

He performed Shakespearean work, such as Ariel in The Tempest opposite John Gielgud's Prospero in 1958, and at the Stratford Festival in Ontario, Canada including Angelo in Measure for Measure, Malvolio in Twelfth Night and the title role in Richard III directed by Robin Phillips, and The Public Theater's New York Shakespeare Festival Shakespeare in the Park productions of As You Like It (as Jacques), and Timon of Athens (as Timon) on Broadway, with the National Actors Theatre in 1993. Bedford's additional Broadway credits include The Seven Descents of Myrtle, Private Lives, Two Shakespearean Actors, London Assurance and Jumpers.

Bedford appeared with James Garner in the 1966 film Grand Prix, and in 1967 he was a regular on the CBS series Coronet Blue. He provided the voice of the title character in the 1973 Disney film Robin Hood, which director Byron Howard credits as a major inspiration for the Academy Award-winning animated film, Zootopia. In 1988, he appeared as Mr. Stone, the head of the consortium that owns Cheers, and would later appear (as a different character) in its spin-off, Frasier, in 2000. In 1997 Bedford was inducted into the American Theater Hall of Fame. Other honours include the Obie Award, the Outer Circle Critics Award, the Drama Desk Award, and the L.A. Drama Critics Award.

In 2009, Bedford starred as Lady Bracknell in The Importance of Being Earnest, marking 27 seasons of acting and/or directing, at the Stratford Festival in Canada.

He repeated the role in 2010 (in a double role as both actor and director) for the Roundabout Theatre in New York, which earned him a 2011 Tony Award nomination for Best Performance by a Leading Actor in a Play.

== Personal life ==
Bedford shared homes in Stratford, Ontario, and in Santa Barbara, California, with fellow actor Tim MacDonald, his partner from 1985 and husband from 2013 until his death.

=== Death ===
Bedford died of cancer on January 13, 2016, in Santa Barbara, California, at the age of 80; his remains were cremated.

== Stratford Shakespeare Festival ==
=== Actor ===
- Twelfth Night (1975) by William Shakespeare – Malvolio
- Measure for Measure (1975) by William Shakespeare – Angelo
- Richard III (1977) by William Shakespeare – Richard III
- The Guardsman (1977) by Ferenc Molnár – The Actor
- As You Like It (1977,1978) by William Shakespeare – Jacques
- Private Lives (1978) by Noël Coward – Elyot
- The Winter's Tale (1978) by William Shakespeare – Leontes
- Uncle Vanya (1978) by Anton Chekhov – Dr Astrov
- Much Ado About Nothing (1980) by William Shakespeare – Benedick
- Twelfth Night (1980) by William Shakespeare – Malvolio
- The Seagull (1980) by Anton Chekhov – Trigorin
- The Misanthrope (1981) by Molière – Alceste
- Arms and the Man (1982) by George Bernard Shaw – Bluntschli
- Blithe Spirit (1982) by Noël Coward – Charles
- Richard II (1983) by William Shakespeare – Richard II
- Tartuffe (1983, 1984) by Molière – Tartuffe
- A Midsummer Night's Dream (1984) by William Shakespeare – Bottom
- Waiting for Godot (1984) by Samuel Beckett – Vladimir
- The Relapse (1989) by John Vanbrugh – Lord Foppington
- The Merchant of Venice (1989) by William Shakespeare – Shylock
- The Lunatic, the Lover & the Poet (1989) by Brian Bedford – adapted Shakespeare texts
- Macbeth (1990) by William Shakespeare – Macbeth
- Julius Caesar (1990) by William Shakespeare – Brutus
- The Lunatic, the Lover & the Poet (1990) by Brian Bedford – adapted Shakespeare texts
- Timon of Athens (1991) by William Shakespeare – Timon
- Much Ado About Nothing (1991) by William Shakespeare – Dogberry
- The School for Wives (1991) by Molière – Arnolphe
- Measure for Measure (1992) by William Shakespeare – Duke
- Twelfth Night (1994) by William Shakespeare – Feste
- The School for Husbands & The Imaginary Cuckold (1994) by Molière – Sganarelle
- Amadeus (1995, 1996) by Peter Shaffer – Salieri
- The Little Foxes (1996) by Lillian Hellman – Horace
- Equus (1997) by Peter Shaffer – Dysart
- Much Ado About Nothing (1998) by William Shakespeare – Benedick
- A Midsummer Night's Dream (1999) by William Shakespeare – Bottom
- The School for Scandal (1999) by Richard Brinsley Sheridan – Sir Peter Teazle
- Tartuffe (2000) by Molière – Tartuffe
- Private Lives (2001) by Noël Coward – Elyot
- The Seagull (2001) by Anton Chekhov – Sorin
- The Lunatic, the Lover & the Poet (2002) by Brian Bedford – adapted Shakespeare texts
- Present Laughter (2003) by Noël Coward – Garry Essendine
- Love's Labour's Lost (2003) by William Shakespeare – Don Armado
- London Assurance (2006) by Dion Boucicault – Sir Harcourt Courtly
- Twelfth Night (2006) by William Shakespeare – Malvolio
- King Lear (2007) by William Shakespeare – King Lear
- The Importance of Being Earnest (2009) by Oscar Wilde – Lady Bracknell

=== Director ===
- Titus Andronicus (1978, 1980) by William Shakespeare
- Coriolanus (1981) by William Shakespeare
- The Rivals (1981) by Richard Brinsley Sheridan
- Blithe Spirit (1982) by Noël Coward
- The Lunatic, the Lover & the Poet (1989, 1990, 2002) by Brian Bedford
- Phaedra (1990) by Racine
- Othello (1994) by William Shakespeare
- Waiting for Godot (1996, 1998) by Samuel Beckett
- Equus (1997) by Peter Shaffer
- The Winter's Tale (1998) by William Shakespeare
- Private Lives (2001) by Noël Coward
- Present Laughter (2003) by Noël Coward
- Noises Off (2004) by Michael Frayn
- Fallen Angels (2005) by Noël Coward
- London Assurance (2006) by Dion Boucicault
- King Lear (2007) by William Shakespeare
- The Importance of Being Earnest (2009) by Oscar Wilde
- Blithe Spirit (2013) by Noël Coward

== Filmography ==
=== Film ===
Year	Title	Role	Notes
1955	Man of the Moment	Clapper boy	Uncredited
1957	Miracle in Soho	Johnny	
1960	The Angry Silence	Eddie Barrett	
1962	Number Six	Jimmy Gale	
1963	The Punch and Judy Man	First Escort	
1966	The Pad and How to Use It	Bob Handman	
1966	Grand Prix	Scott Stoddard	
1973	Robin Hood	Robin Hood	Voice role
1995	Nixon	Clyde Tolson	
2011	The Importance of Being Earnest	Lady Bracknell	Also director

=== Television ===
Year	Title	Role	Notes
1955	Madeleine	Maxime	TV movie
1958	ITV Play of the Week	Miolands the Herald	Episode: "Winterset"
1958	ITV Play of the Week	Victor	Episode: "Squaring the Circle"
1958	ITV Play of the Week	Chris	Episode: "As the Twig is Bent"
1961	ITV Television Playhouse	Ralph Whitlock	Episode: "The Bad One"
1961	BBC Sunday-Night Play	Lieutenant Chanz	Episode: "The Judge and His Hangman"
1961	Traitor in a Steel Helmet	Trooper Jupp	TV movie
1962	Edgar Wallace Mysteries	Jimmy Gale	Episode: "Number Six"
1962	Sir Francis Drake	Estaban	Episode: "Escape"
1962	The Secret Thread	Tony	TV movie
1965	Ben Casey	Pat Jordan	Episode: "Then I, and You, and All of Us Fell Down"
1965	The Holy Terror	Billy Sims	TV movie
1966	New York Television Theatre		Episode: "The Dark Lady of the Sonnets"
1967	Androcles and the Lion	Lentulus	TV movie
1967	Coronet Blue	Brother Anthony	Recurring role
1969	Judd, for the Defense	Eric Wright	Episode: "The Crystal Maze"
1969	The Name of the Game	Anthony Malcolm	Episode: "An Agent of the Plaintiff"
1971	Nanny and the Professor	Cholmondeley Featherstonehaugh	Episode: "Cholmondeley Featherstonehaugh"
1985	Alfred Hitchcock Presents	Stewart Dean	Episode: "Wake Me When I'm Dead"
1985	The Equalizer	W. Donald Polk	Episode: "Bump and Run"
1987	The Equalizer	Paul Coble	Episode: "Beyond Control"
1988	Murder, She Wrote	Alastair Andrews	Episode: "Benedict Arnold Slipped Here"
1988	Cheers	Greg Stone	Episode: "How to Recede in Business"
1989	The Equalizer	Emil Kostov	Episode: "Time Present, Time Past"
1989	Alfred Hitchcock Presents	Sherlock Holmes	Episode: "My Dear Watson"
1990	The Last Best Year	Dr. Castle	TV movie
1993	Bob	Dr. Edward Mars Jones	Episode: "The Man Who Killed Mad Dog"
1994	Scarlett	Sir John Morland	Miniseries
1998	More Tales of the City	Henry Callaway Kent	1 episode
2000	Frasier	Edward	Episode: "Out with Dad"
2002	Mr. St. Nick	Jasper	TV movie
2004	A Christmas Carol: The Musical	Mr. Fezzwing	TV movie
2004	Great Performances	Degas	Episode: "Degas and the Dance"
2014	Black Jesus		Episode: "I Gave at the Playground"

== Awards and nominations ==
Tony Awards

- 1971 Best Leading Actor in Play – The School for Wives (winner)
- 1992 Best Leading Actor in Play – Two Shakespearean Actors (nominee)
- 1994 Best Leading Actor in Play – Timon of Athens (nominee)
- 1995 Best Leading Actor in Play – The Molière Comedies (nominee)
- 1997 Best Leading Actor in Play – London Assurance (nominee)
- 2003 Best Leading Actor in Play – Tartuffe (nominee)
- 2011 Best Leading Actor in Play – The Importance of Being Earnest (nominee)

Drama Desk Awards

- 1969 Outstanding Performance – The Misanthrope (winner)
- 1970 Outstanding Performance – Private Lives (winner)
- 1971 Outstanding Performance – The School for Wives (winner)
- 1974 Outstanding Performance – Jumpers (winner)
- 1992 Outstanding Actor in a Play – Two Shakespearean Actors (winner)
- 1994 Outstanding Actor in a Play – Timon of Athens (nominee)
- 2011 Outstanding Featured Actor in a Play – The Importance of Being Earnest (winner)

Obie Awards

- 1965 Outstanding Performance – The Knack (winner)
