= List of Soap characters =

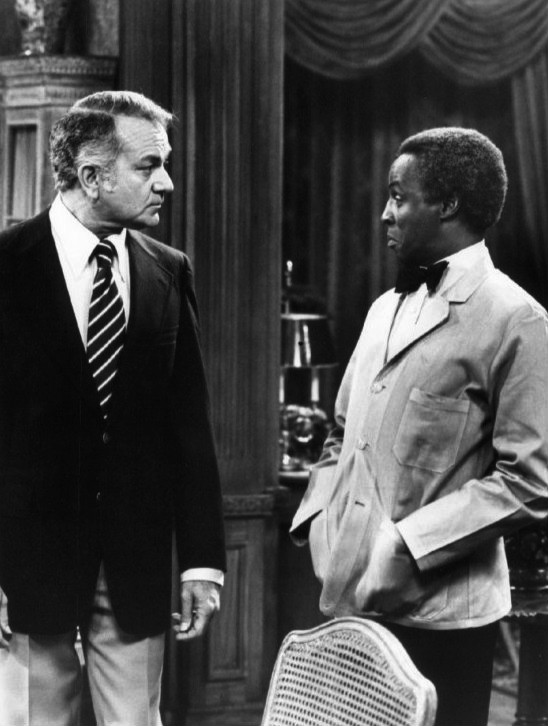
Chester and Benson.

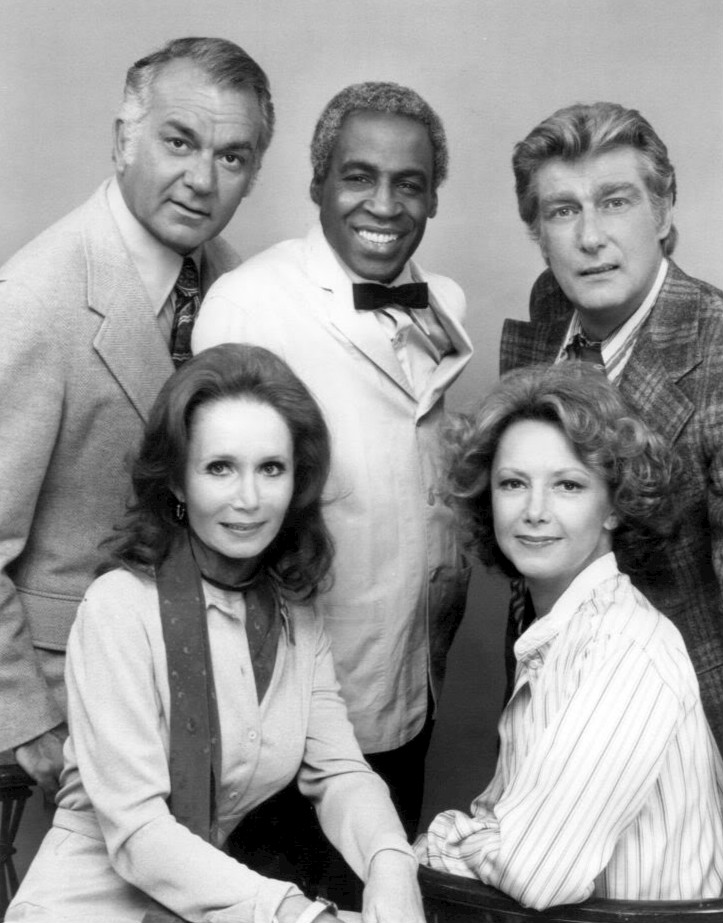
The Tates and Campbells with Benson.

Soap is an American sitcom television series that originally ran on ABC from 1977 through 1981. A parody of soap operas, the show's story was presented in a serial format and featured melodramatic plotlines revolving around a large family in the fictional town of Dunn's River, Connecticut.

The series revolves around the households of sisters Jessica Tate (Katherine Helmond) and Mary Campbell (Cathryn Damon). Actors who play members of the Tate household include Robert Mandan as Jessica's husband Chester; Jennifer Salt, Diana Canova, and Jimmy Baio as their children; Eunice, Corinne and Billy; Arthur Peterson Jr. as Jessica and Mary's father, a retired U.S. Army major; and Robert Guillaume as the family butler Benson. Other members of the Campbell household include Richard Mulligan as Mary's second husband Burt; Ted Wass and Billy Crystal as Danny and Jodie, Mary's sons from her first marriage; and Jay Johnson as Burt's son Chuck and his ventriloquist dummy Bob. Later additions to the main cast include Donnelly Rhodes as Dutch Leitner, an escaped convict who lives with the Tates, and Roscoe Lee Browne as Saunders, Benson's replacement as the Tate family butler.

Additionally, Rod Roddy provides the voice of the unseen announcer, who recaps the plot of the previous episode and teases the plot of the following one. Casey Kasem provided the narration in the pilot episode.

== Tate family ==
- Jessica Tate (née Gatling) (Katherine Helmond) – The sister of Mary Campbell and one of the two main characters of the show. She is married to wealthy Chester Tate but separates from and later divorces him after years of infidelity. Sweet-natured, extraordinarily naïve and sheltered, she is often in her own world. Her flirtatious nature and hourglass figure make her a frequent target of male attention. In the final moments of the series, she faces a firing squad with rescue unlikely. A subsequent appearance on Benson, set two years later, revealed that she survived, but was left comatose. Helmond is one of the two actors to appear in every episode, with Richard Mulligan (Burt) being the other.
- Chester Tate (Robert Mandan) – A wealthy stockbroker and Jessica's husband. He is a constant and almost compulsive philanderer, having had dozens of affairs. He eventually swears off his infidelity, but subsequently experiences a brain tumor, followed by a bout of amnesia. After he recovers, he resumes his philandering ways, causing his marriage to Jessica to end in divorce; he nonetheless continues to love her even after he marries Eunice's friend Annie. It is later revealed that he only agreed to marry Jessica in exchange for her mother keeping quiet about Chester's father's financial crimes, having already been in a relationship with her sister Mary and unknowingly fathering her first son, Danny. The series ends as he prepares to pull the trigger on Danny and Annie.
- Eunice Tate-Leitner (Jennifer Salt) – Jessica and Chester's eldest daughter. A spoiled social climber, Eunice dates a married congressman and later falls in love with escaped convict Dutch Leitner. While she loves Dutch passionately during his time on the run and his subsequent incarceration, she cools off considerably once he becomes a free man, leaving him on a whim several times.
- Corinne Tate Flotsky (Diana Canova) – Jessica and Chester's adopted daughter, actually the daughter of Jessica's long-lost brother Randolph Gatling and family maid Ingrid Svenson. She admits to having slept with most of the male population of Dunn's River (including Burt's son Peter, even after learning he's Burt's son) after her childhood love Tim became a Catholic priest. She eventually convinces Tim to leave the priesthood and marry her, but their son, Timmy, ends up being possessed, and Tim eventually leaves her and returns to the cloth. She later has an affair with Dutch and leaves Dunn's River for California to raise Timmy after Dutch gets back together with Eunice.
- Billy Tate (Jimmy Baio) – The youngest child and only son of Jessica and Chester (according to Benson, "the only one in this family worth a damn"). He gets caught up in a cult and later has an affair with his high school teacher, Leslie Walker. After he breaks off the affair, she makes multiple failed (and laughable) attempts to kill him and his family. He later becomes a general in El Puerco's revolutionary army after rescuing him and Jessica from being lost in the ocean, learning Spanish and becoming very devoted to the revolutionaries' anti-Communist cause. However, his family members do not take this seriously.
- Major Gatling (Arthur Peterson Jr.) - The father of Jessica Tate and Mary Campbell. The Major suffers from dementia and believes he is in the midst of fighting World War II. He often refers to Chester as "Colonel". The Major is always in uniform and often irritates Benson and Saunders with his obliviously racist remarks.
- Benson DuBois (Robert Guillaume) – The Tates' wisecracking African American cook and butler in the first two seasons. He enjoys making sarcastic quips at his employers' expense but cannot deny his soft spot for Jessica, Corinne, and, most notably, Billy. Following the second season, Benson leaves the Tates to be the head of household affairs for Jessica's cousin, Governor Eugene Gatling (as depicted in the spin-off series Benson), though he makes two guest appearances in the third season.
- Father Timothy Flotsky (Sal Viscuso) – A Catholic priest who leaves the priesthood to marry Corinne Tate. He is skeptical when Corinne's pregnancy progresses more quickly than it should; it turns out that a demon possesses their son Timmy. Tim later decides that leaving the Church was a mistake, leaving Corinne and Timmy to become a priest again.
- Timmy Tate-Flotsky – Corinne and Tim's son, who is possessed by the devil for a time (voiced by Tim McIntire). Once Jessica confronts the demon inhabiting him, he becomes a normal infant.
- Ingrid Svenson (Inga Swenson) – Corinne's biological mother, who was the former maid of Jessica and Mary's parents and who was in love with Jessica and Mary's brother, Randolph Gatling. She attempts to avenge the Tate/Campbell family for opposing her romance with Randolph. She tries to influence Jessica's murder trial by sleeping with the judge and blackmailing Sally, Burt's secretary, into trying to break up Burt and Mary's marriage.
- Randolph Gatling (Bernard Fox) - Jessica and Mary's estranged brother and Corinne's biological father. He lives in Ecuador with his wife, former family maid, Ingrid Svenson, and has no interest in reconnecting with his family.
- Dutch Leitner (Donnelly Rhodes) – An escaped convict who hides out with the Tates after helping Chester break out of prison. He falls in love with and eventually marries Eunice after on-off relationships with both her and Corinne. Though dim-witted and coarse in his manners, he is good-hearted, emotionally sensitive, and genuinely devoted to the family.
- Saunders (Roscoe Lee Browne) – Benson's replacement as the Tates' cook/butler. He is slightly more refined and polished than his predecessor, but no less disdainful of his employers.
- Annie Selig Tate (Nancy Dolman) – Eunice's friend who serves as her maid of honor at her wedding to Dutch. She later becomes Chester's second wife, earning Eunice's disgust. She has an affair with Danny when Chester begins to ignore her to win Jessica back, and the series ends with Chester preparing to kill them both.

== Campbell family ==
- Mary Campbell (née Gatling, previously Dallas) (Cathryn Damon) – The sister of Jessica Tate and one of the two main characters of the show. Much more down-to-earth than her sister, she provides a comic foil to the antics of the rest of the cast. At the start of the series, she is recently married to her second husband, building contractor Burt Campbell, who, unbeknownst to Mary, is suffering impotence as a result of having killed her first husband, gangster Johnny Dallas, in self-defense. In season three, Mary gives birth to a baby named Scott who she suspects was fathered by Burt's alien double, but whom no one else sees behaving oddly. This, along with Burt's political career and her past with Chester being exposed, drives Mary to alcoholism.
- Burt Campbell (Richard Mulligan) – Burt is Mary Campbell's second husband. In contrast to Chester, Burt is a loving family man with a strong marriage to Mary. Burt is a high-strung building contractor who later becomes sheriff and is under consideration for a run as lieutenant governor. In Season 1, Burt suffers from mental illness due to his guilt over accidentally killing Mary's first husband and later the murder of his son Peter. He is, for a time, abducted by aliens and replaced with a lookalike before managing to talk them into giving him back his life. He is later diagnosed as terminally ill, but it turns out to be a false alarm. At the end of Season 3, Burt becomes sheriff and gets increasingly involved in politics throughout Season 4, leading him to ignore his family and put his marriage at risk. His final moment in the series is when he prepares to walk into an ambush orchestrated by his political enemies. Mulligan is one of the two actors to appear in every episode, with Katherine Helmond (Jessica) being the other.
- Danny Dallas (Ted Wass) – Mary Campbell's eldest son. Sweet-natured and good-looking but not exceptionally bright, he initially follows in his late father Johnny's footsteps by becoming a gangster. Danny is tasked with killing Johnny's killer and Danny's new stepfather, Burt. He can't bring himself to do so and, after making peace with the mob, he becomes Burt's enthusiastic sidekick in multiple endeavors. His real father is eventually revealed not to be Johnny Dallas but Chester Tate, born from his relationship with Mary before marrying her sister Jessica. Danny is very protective of his younger brother Jodie but is initially in denial about Jodie's homosexuality. Danny is forced to marry Elaine, the mob boss's daughter, to save his own life. He eventually falls in love with her before she is later kidnapped and fatally shot. Danny later gets involved in a series of failed relationships, including the girlfriend of one of Elaine's kidnappers (Millie), an African American woman (Polly Dawson), a prostitute (Gwen), and Chester's new wife (Annie). In the final moments of the series, Chester discovers Danny in bed with Annie and prepares to shoot them both.
- Jodie Dallas (Billy Crystal) – The son of Mary Campbell and her first husband Johnny Dallas. An openly gay man, he shares his mother's common sense and pleasant temperament. He is first dating a closeted football player named Dennis and prepares to undergo a sex-change operation. After Dennis dumps him, he attempts suicide, but survives and aborts the sex-change. He later fathers a daughter named Wendy with Carol, a legal aid, who seduces him after meeting at his Aunt Jessica's murder trial. After Carol runs off to join the rodeo, Wendy is left with Jodie, triggering a custody battle and a kidnapping that Jodie foils with the help of private investigator Maggie, for whom Jodie has feelings that make him doubt his sexuality. The series ends with Jodie believing himself to be an old Jewish man, Julius Kassendorf, due to a failed hypnotherapy session.
- Chuck and Bob Campbell (Jay Johnson) – Chuck is Burt Campbell's son by his first marriage. A ventriloquist, he is always accompanied by his dummy Bob. The pair dress alike and are always referred to as "Chuck and Bob". While Chuck is mild-mannered, introverted, and polite, his alter-ego Bob is aggressive, rude and abrasive. Chuck always treats Bob as though he were real, and nearly all of the main characters find themselves conversing with or referring to Bob at one point or another despite knowing he is a dummy, the only exceptions being Benson and Saunders.
- Peter Campbell (Robert Urich) – Burt's son from his first marriage, a promiscuous tennis pro who is carrying on affairs with both Jessica and Corinne, as well as other women around town, including Sheila Fine. He is stabbed, shot, strangled, suffocated, and bludgeoned by an unseen assailant, and the driving question of who killed him and why leads to the cliffhanger ending of season one. In Season two, Chester is revealed to be the culprit, having unknowingly done so, under the effect of a rare brain tumor.
- Wendy Dallas – Jodie's infant daughter, with Carol David. She is brought to Jodie after Carol runs away, only for Carol to return and sue for custody, and subsequently kidnap her daughter back. Jodie later rescues his daughter with help from family.
- Scott Campbell – Mary's infant son who she believes was fathered by Burt's alien double. Appears to be a normal baby but reportedly performs bizarre feats such as levitation when only Mary is looking.

== Jessica's love interests ==
Characters who had or pursued a romantic relationship with Jessica Tate.

- E. Ronald Mallu, Esq. (Eugene Roche) – High-priced attorney who defends Jessica in her murder trial and falls in love with her. Mallu returns in Season 3 to represent Jodie in his custody case, and attempts to date the newly separated Jessica as well. Mallu is a thinly veiled caricature of the defense attorney F. Lee Bailey.
- Detective George Donohue (John Byner) – Hired by Jessica to find the missing amnesiac Chester in Season 2, he falls for Jessica, forcing her to choose between the two when Chester returns home. She chooses Chester but nevertheless allows Donohue to stay in the house while he recovers from his depression. When Jessica and Chester separate, she returns to him, but he has moved on, and married another woman, leaving Jessica no choice but to wish them well and move on.
- Dr. Alan Posner (Allan Miller) – Jessica's somewhat disturbed psychiatrist in Season 3, whose ex-wife, like Chester, was a notorious philanderer (and probably had an affair with Chester somewhere along the line). He briefly dates her once she is separated from Chester, but becomes clingy and hysterical when she dumps him.
- Dr. Hill (Granville Van Dusen) – The doctor who diagnoses Jessica with a fatal disease at the end of Season 3; he is among the many who fall in love with her.
- Carlos Marcello David Escobar Rodriguez "El Puerco" (Spanish: the pig) Valdez (Gregory Sierra) – A deposed anti-communist revolutionary from the fictional country of Malaguay. He tricks Jessica into helping him escape custody and then kidnaps her, but later falls in love with her and moves into her home along with his entourage of soldiers.

== Danny's love interests ==
Characters who had or pursued a romantic relationship with Danny Dallas.

- Elaine Lefkowitz (Dinah Manoff) – Daughter of Danny's mob under-boss, her obnoxious, pushy personality makes a coerced marriage painful for Danny at first. After they genuinely fall in love, and her personality softens, Elaine is kidnapped and fatally shot, which fuels Danny's quest for revenge.
- Millie (Candice Azzara) – Girlfriend of one of Elaine's kidnappers, she rescues Danny and comes home with him, but cannot deal with the Campbell family and thus leaves.
- Polly Dawson (Lynne Moody) – A young African American widow who falls in love with Danny. They buy a house together but decide against marriage in the end.
- Gwen (Jesse Welles) – A prostitute who falls for Danny in Season 4 but leaves him to protect them both from a death threat.

== Jodie's love interests ==
Characters who had or pursued a romantic relationship with Jodie Dallas.

- Dennis Phillips (Bob Seagren) – A closeted pro football quarterback and Jodie's secret lover at the beginning of the series. He attempts to marry a woman he doesn't love for his career's sake but comes back to Jodie after his sham marriage fails. He later leaves Jodie for good, when Jodie wishes to stay with Carol for the sake of their baby.
- Nurse Nancy Darwin (Udana Power) – Jodie's nurse who takes an interest in him when he is planning a sex-change operation. The two plan to go on a date, but Jodie stands her up.
- Carol David (Rebecca Balding) – An attorney who falls for Jodie and convinces him to sleep with her. After revealing she is pregnant, she and Jodie get engaged, but she leaves him at the altar. She runs away with a cowboy and leaves the baby, Wendy, with her mother, who brings her to Jodie. Carol fights for custody of Wendy in Season 3, and, after losing, kidnaps the baby and joins a ninja cult.
- Alice (Randee Heller) – A lesbian who begins a platonic romantic relationship with Jodie in season 2. She gets along well with Jodie's daughter Wendy but leaves after seeing Mrs. David's reluctance to leave her granddaughter with a lesbian as well as a gay man. Alice is American television's first recurring lesbian character.
- Maggie Chandler (Barbara Rhoades) – A private investigator who helps Jodie search for his daughter and is the first woman he has romantic feelings for. Jodie proposes to her while facing certain death; once released he is less sure, and goes to hypnotherapy to find out the truth about his sexuality. After the hypnosis, he believes he is a 90-year-old man who doesn't remember Maggie.

== Other characters' love interests ==
- Claire (Kathryn Reynolds) – Chester's secretary and mistress. She has been Chester's secretary for twelve years, and his mistress for almost as long. She blackmails Chester, ordering him to divorce his wife or go to prison for securities fraud. He eventually dumps and fires her to support Jessica through her trial, prompting Claire to follow through on her threats.
- "Pigeon" (Marianne Bunch) – Chester's other mistress whom he is cheating on Claire with.
- Congressman Walter McCallum (Edward Winter) – Secretly sees Eunice until his wife, Marilyn, blackmails him into ending the relationship.
- Sally (Caroline McWilliams) – Burt's secretary who attempts to seduce Burt, then lies to Mary about sleeping with him, all of which was due to blackmail pressure from the family's enemy, Ingrid Svenson.
- Professor Anatole Martins (Lee Bergere) – Mary's college professor, in Season 2. He makes unwelcome passes at Mary, and later attacks her, which Burt witnesses, and mistakes for an affair.
- Lisa (Ruth Cox) – Billy's classmate who lures him to the Sunnies.
- Leslie Walker (Marla Pennington) – A young school teacher who falls in love with Billy, but becomes suicidal and later homicidal after he breaks it off. Her laughable attempts to kill Billy with a variety of weapons often interrupt other scenes and are subsequently barely mentioned.
- Secretary (Karen Austin) - A secretary, and former flame of Chester's, who lures him back to his old philandering ways after his attempted reform. Jessica later catches the two in a hotel room.
- Gloria (Colleen Riley) – The daughter of a minister Chester sees for counseling on his compulsive sexual behavior who seduces him, and puts the final nail in the coffin for Jessica and Chester's marriage.

== Family members of recurring characters ==
- Flo Flotsky (Doris Roberts) – Tim's unhinged mother, who curses her son for leaving the priesthood to marry Corinne, then after making a scene at the wedding, dies on their wedding night, and is responsible for the curse on their baby.
- Marilyn McCallum (Judith-Marie Bergan) – The congressman's wife, who blackmails him into ending the relationship with Eunice.
- 'Boomer' David (Michael Conrad) - Carol's father who disapproves of his daughter's relationship with Jodie.
- Lurleen David (Peggy Pope) – Carol's mother. Despite not approving of Jodie's homosexuality, she decides to allow him to raise his daughter when Carol abandons her, on the condition that Jodie end his relationship with the lesbian Alice. During the custody battle, she is coerced into lying on the stand, claiming she had been threatened into giving up her granddaughter. Eventually, she decides to tell the truth, destroying Carol's case.
- Charlie Walker (Kenneth Gilman) – Leslie's abusive ex-husband whom Billy stands up to.
- Rose (Royce Wallace) and Walter Coleman (Mel Stewart) – Polly's parents who worry about her relationship with Danny. Rose makes friends with Mary and Jessica.
- Eddie Coleman (Kene Holliday) – Polly's hostile brother, who does not approve of her dating Danny.
- R.C. (Ted Shackelford) – A cowboy and Carol's new man who helps her appeal for custody of Wendy and, after they lose, assists her in Wendy's kidnapping.

== Criminals ==
- The Godfather (Richard Libertini) – Mob over-boss who orders Danny to kill Burt (the killer of Danny's father) in Season 1. When Danny fails to do so, The Godfather eventually forgives him as Danny is clearly an incompetent gangster.
- Charles Lefkowitz (Sorrell Booke) – Elaine's mob-boss father and Danny's under-boss, who calls off the contract on Danny in exchange for marrying Elaine, then cuts her off and refuses to pay the ransom when she is kidnapped.
- Mel (Frank Coppola) – Elaine's kidnapper and murderer and Millie's boyfriend.
- Dave (Greg Antonacci) – Mel's partner
- Reverend Sung (Michael DeLano) – A dangerous and charismatic cult leader.
- Simon (Robert Englund) and Roger (Scott Mulhem) - Members of the cult group, "The Sunnies" who torture Billy in an attempt to brainwash him.
- Elmore Tibbs (Hamilton Camp) – Mid-level mobster who runs a prostitution ring in town, blackmails Burt and Danny to force them to stop from shutting him down.
- General Sandia (Luis Avalos) and Private Esquivo (Barry Vigon) – Members of Malaguay's communist regime who kidnap Jessica.

== Court system ==
- Chief of Police Tinkler (Gordon Jump) – Responsible for the investigation of the murder of Peter Campbell, Tinkler always seems to arrive at the Tate house in time to share their dinner. Apparently also serves as the court bailiff in Dunn's River. He routinely misidentifies himself as "Piece of Cholief" Tinkler.
- Mr. Franklin (Howard Hesseman) – The smarmy prosecuting attorney in Jessica's murder trial, and a strong rival of Mallu. His twin brother (Also played by Hesseman) is also an attorney, whom Chester attempted to hire to represent Jessica, but refused to take the case.
- Heimrich Himmel (William Daniels) Abrasive private investigator, hired by Ingrid Svenson, who harshly interrogates the Cambells and Tates about their secrets and their connections to Peter.
- Judge Anthony Petrillo (Charles Lane) – The judge presiding over Jessica's murder trial. Lost $40,000 in a bad investment deal because of Chester, and clearly holds a grudge against him for it.
- Judge Betty Small (Rae Allen) – Judge presiding over the Carol David/Jodie Dallas custody case, who formerly had a strong rivalry with Mallu.
- F. Peter Haversham (Michael Durrell) – Ruthless attorney who represents Carol in the custody battle. Arch-nemesis of E. Ronald Mallu.

== Doctors ==
- Dr. Medlow (Byron Webster) – Psychiatrist for Burt Campbell who attempts to assist Burt with his impotence and then his perceived invisibility.
- Dr. Kanter (Ron Rifkin) – Physician who diagnoses Chester's brain tumor as the reason he can't remember killing Peter Campbell
- Dr. Rudolph (George Wyner) – Hypnotherapist who, greedy for fame, carelessly hypnotizes Jodie using past life regression so that Jodie becomes stuck in a previous life as Julius, an elderly Jewish man from Minsk.

== Other ==
- Mrs. Sheila Fine (Nita Talbot) – Housewife who has an affair with Peter Campbell and provides crucial testimony against Jessica in the Season 1 murder trial.
- Barney Gerber (Harold Gould) – Elderly hospital patient who shares a room with Jodie in Season 1, and whose story gives Jodie the inspiration to continue living after a suicide attempt.
- Babette (Susan Harris) – A local prostitute who shares a cell with Jessica
- Saul (Jack Gilford) – A four-thousand-plus-year-old man who lives in the spacecraft but helps Burt escape from the aliens in Season 3, who claims to have helped write The Bible.
- X23 (Richard Mulligan) - An alien who assumes the identity of Burt. He exhausts Mary with nonstop intercourse, and makes passes at every other female he crosses paths with. He's likely the father of Mary's baby, Scott.
- Minister (John Hillerman) - A marriage counselor whom Jessica and Chester see about their marital problems, who has a strange interest in Indians. His daughter, Gloria, tempts Chester.
- Juan One (Joe Mantegna) – The second in command to El Puerco, one of three soldiers named Juan.
- Juan Two (Laurie Faso) and Juan Three (Chico Martinez)- The second and third of three soldiers named Juan.
- The Governor (Michael Currie) – The unnamed governor of Connecticut who wants to make Burt his lieutenant governor
