= List of Soap episodes =

The American sitcom television series Soap originally aired 85 episodes over four seasons from September 13, 1977, to April 20, 1981. The series is a parody of soap operas and features a large ensemble cast.

The show ran for 85 episodes in its original ABC broadcasts, but its syndication package included 93 episodes (several one-hour ABC episodes, mostly from the condensed Season 4, were split into half-hour syndication episodes).

There were also four Soap retrospective specials, which were clip shows designed to catch viewers up with the previous seasons' storylines. The first of these was broadcast on December 20, 1977, after the first 13 shows had aired. The other three were shown at the beginning of each new season (on August 31, 1978, just before Season 2; on August 30, 1979, just before Season 3; and on October 29, 1980, just before the shortened Season 4.)

== Series overview ==
Season	Episodes	Originally released	
Season	Episodes	First released	Last released
1	25	September 13, 1977	March 28, 1978
2	23	September 14, 1978	March 15, 1979
3	23	September 13, 1979	March 27, 1980
4	22	November 12, 1980	April 20, 1981

== Episodes ==
The 93-episode version of the episode list is shown here, with an indication of what the episode numbers would have been in the show's original run displayed in the last column.

=== Season 1 (1977–78) ===
No.	Focal characters introduced in the episode	Original release date	Or.
1	Benson (Robert Guillaume), Chester Tate (Robert Mandan), Jessica Tate (Katherine Helmond), Corinne Tate (Diana Canova), Eunice Tate (Jennifer Salt), Billy Tate (Jimmy Baio), The Major (Arthur Peterson Jr.), Burt Campbell (Richard Mulligan), Mary Campbell (Cathryn Damon), Danny Dallas (Ted Wass), Jodie Dallas (Billy Crystal), Peter Campbell (Robert Urich).	September 13, 1977	1
Benson, the Tate family butler, has a rivalry with Chester Tate, his employer; however, he's protective of the rest of the family.; Chester Tate, the Tate family patriarch, is cheating on his wife, Jessica Tate.; Billy Tate, Chester's and Jessica's youngest child, is the only person in the Tate family who seems to be normal.; The Major is Jessica Tate's father and believes World War II is still in progress.; Corinne Tate, Chester and Jessica Tate's adopted daughter, is having an affair with Peter, the tennis instructor.; Eunice Tate, Chester and Jessica Tate's daughter, appears to be prudish and snobbish.; Jessica Tate is also having an affair with Peter, the tennis instructor, unbeknownst to her daughter Corinne.; Burt Campbell, the Campbell family's patriarch, can't get along with stepsons Danny and Jodie Dallas, and can't make love to his wife Mary Campbell, Jessica Tate's sister, because he feels guilty about killing her former husband, Johnny Dallas.; Danny Dallas is in the mob.; Jodie Dallas is gay.
2	Claire (Kathryn Reynolds), The Godfather (Richard Libertini).	September 20, 1977	2
Jessica tells Mary she is having an affair, but not with whom.; Chester's secretary, Claire, with whom he is having an affair, says she intends to blackmail him into leaving Jessica.; Jodie tells Mary he's thinking of having a sex-change operation.; Burt announces to his family that both families will meet with his long-lost biological son.; Danny asks his mob boss, The Godfather, to let him leave the mob. The Godfather agrees on the condition that Danny take a contract out on the person who killed his father.; Peter the tennis pro, who is having an affair with Jessica and Corinne, turns out to be Burt's long-lost son.; Mary realizes that Jessica had an affair with Peter, but so is Corinne.
3	None.	September 27, 1977	3
Mary is unable to convince Jessica that Chester has been unfaithful and confronts Burt about their sexual problems.; Jessica tries to confess to Chester about her affair with Peter, but Chester misinterprets the confession as an accusation.; Burt analyzes his inability to get along with Danny and Jodie.; Danny is told by The Godfather that Burt killed Danny's father and he must kill Burt, or the Mob will kill him.
4	Dennis Phillips (Bob Seagren), Pigeon (Marianne Bunch), Molly (Olivia Barash).	October 4, 1977	4
Jessica tries to say goodbye to Peter, only to end up in bed with him again, and is caught by Corinne at Peter's apartment.; Jodie learns that his boyfriend, Dennis the quarterback, has been dating a woman to protect his media image, and tells Dennis that he plans to solve the problem by becoming a woman.; Chester is confronted at a restaurant by Claire and "Pigeon", with whom he has been conducting simultaneous affairs.; Mary urges Jessica to break off with Peter and suggests that Peter is also involved with Corinne.; Jessica reveals that Corinne is adopted.; Billy, trying to live a normal life amidst the Tate family strangeness, negotiates "going steady" with local girl, Molly.; Danny gets nowhere in his attempts to kill Burt.
5	Father Tim Flotsky (Sal Viscuso), Congressman McCallum (Edward Winter), Mrs. Fein (Nita Talbot).	October 13, 1977	5
Danny continues trying to kill Burt.; Chester fakes being sick so he can sneak out to see Claire.; Jodie and Dennis run into Eunice and Congressman McCallum, the married politician with whom she is having a tryst, at a restaurant.; Mary and Burt visit a sex therapist, Dr. Medlow.; Corinne tells Father Tim, a Catholic priest, that she's in love with him, hoping that he'll offer her an alternative to moving in with Peter; later, she catches Jessica kissing Peter goodbye, but Corinne thinks they are carrying on.; Jessica catches Mrs. Fein, yet another woman with whom Peter is having an affair, in Peter's apartment.
6	None.	October 25, 1977	6
Billy is depressed because Molly left him.; Jessica breaks the news to Chester that Corinne is moving in with Peter.; Corinne tells Eunice about Jessica and Peter, and Eunice tells Corinne about her and Congressman Walter McCallum.; Jessica tries to apologize to Corinne, but she doesn't listen; she explains to Mary about the story of her and Peter.; Burt announces his son Chuck Campbell is coming to visit, along with Bob, his ventriloquist's dummy.; Corinne tells Father Tim she is going to move in with Peter, having failed to tempt him away from his vow of chastity.; Danny is told by the Godfather to kill Burt at a cabin in the woods.
7	Chuck and Bob Campbell (Jay Johnson).	November 1, 1977	7
The Major kidnaps the Tate's neighbor, Mr. Kirby.; Danny invites Burt to the cabin in the woods.; Chester is delivered an ultimatum by Claire.; Chuck arrives at the Campbell house, and to everyone's surprise, expects his ventriloquist dummy Bob to be treated as if he is a real person.; Claire tells Jessica about her affair with Chester, but Jessica concludes that Claire is insane, much to Benson's dismay.; Danny points a gun at Burt's head and prepares to pull the trigger.
8	None.	November 8, 1977	8
Danny decides he can't kill Burt after all.; Mary has trouble accommodating Chuck and Bob at breakfast.; Danny comes to terms with Jodie being gay.; Burt and Danny make up a story about Danny being a spy so he can run away to hide from the mob.; Benson stands up to Chuck and Bob.; Danny shows up in disguise to dinner at the Tates' house to which the Campbells have been invited, but the mob attempts to assassinate him anyway.
9	Barney Gerber (Harold Gould), Nurse Nancy Darwin (Udana Power), Johnny Dallas (Eric Mason).	November 15, 1977	9
Jodie checks into the hospital for his sex-change operation; meets Barney Gerber, a heart patient in the next bed; receives an offer from Nurse Nancy to cure Jodie of his desire to be a woman.; Burt tells his therapist about how and why he killed Mary's first husband Johnny Dallas; the therapist reassures Burt it was self-defense and not murder.; Jodie is visited by Dennis, Corinne, Eunice, Benson and Danny – in disguise – in the hospital.; Corinne tells Jodie she's in love with Father Tim.; Mary and Jessica meet for lunch, where they see Chester and Claire kissing.
10	None.	November 22, 1977	10
Jessica and Mary conclude there's a curse on the family.; Danny is pursued by The Godfather to the Campbell house, but Danny's rabbi disguise fools him.; Burt is finally cured of his impotency after his therapy session, but Mary is too overwhelmed by the family's other problems to get "in the mood."; Father Tim asks God what he should do about Corinne.; Jodie attempts suicide after Dennis backs out of their relationship, but Barney tries to cheer him up with his views on the unpredictability of happiness.
11	None.	November 29, 1977	11
Burt and Mary are nervous about their "first time" in six months but are interrupted by a would-be robber initially confused for Danny.; The Campbell family (including Danny dressed as a sheik) learn of Jodie's suicide attempt.; Jodie promises Mary that he won't try again to commit suicide and abandons the sex-change operation.; Corinne tells Peter that she'll kill him if she ever catches him cheating.; Jessica confronts Chester about his affair with Claire and admits to having had an affair of her own when Chester won't take her seriously. She walks out on Chester when he flatly denies ever having been unfaithful.
12	None.	December 6, 1977	12
Jessica comes home after staying out all night and warns Chester that she won't tolerate any further affairs.; Jodie checks out of the hospital and is corralled by Nurse Nancy into going on a date. He says goodbye to Barney, with a promise of staying in touch.; Jessica visits Peter and catches Mrs. Fein hiding in the bathroom – again. She threatens to kill Peter for cheating on Corinne.; Burt gives Jodie advice about his date with Nurse Nancy.; Corinne tells Father Tim that she has caught Peter with another woman.; Peter is murdered by an unseen assailant.
13	Chief of Police Tinkler (Gordon Jump).	December 13, 1977	13
Burt and Mary finally get their sex life going again.; Burt finds Peter dead in the shower.; Chester learns from Chief of Police Tinkler that Jessica's affair was with Peter.; The Tates and the Campbells are informed by Chief of Police Tinkler that they are all suspects in Peter's murder.; Jodie reveals he stood Nancy up.
14	Marilyn McCallum (Judith-Marie Bergan).	December 27, 1977	14
Chester finally realizes what it feels like to be cheated on and promises to never cheat again.; The Tates and the Campbells speculate about which of them murdered Peter.; Eunice tells Congressman McCallum that he is her alibi for the night of the murder and is almost caught, by McCallum's alcoholic wife Marilyn, with the Congressman in the bathroom.; Corinne is arrested by Chief Tinkler for the murder of Peter.
15	Babette (Susan Harris), Ingrid Svenson (Inga Swenson), Randolph (Bernard Fox), Elaine Lefkowitz (Dinah Manoff), Charles Lefkowitz (Sorrell Booke).	January 3, 1978	15
Corinne is taken to jail.; Burt tries to recreate the scene of Peter's murder.; Danny, tiring of running from the mob, plans to confront Mr. Lefkowitz, the crime kingpin.; Randolph, Jessica and Mary's brother, and his paramour Ingrid learn of Corinne's arrest.; Danny breaks into Lefkowitz's house and meets his sex-starved daughter, Elaine.; Jodie is given motherly advice by Mary about rebuilding his life.; Tinkler is surprised by Ingrid's appearance at the jail, and surprised further to learn that she is Corinne's real mother.
16	Heinrich Himmel (William Daniels).	January 10, 1978	16
Corinne is visited by Jessica, Chester and Ingrid and is devastated to learn that Ingrid is her natural mother.; Burt continues to examine the evidence about Peter's murder.; Danny decides to no longer live his life in disguise.; The Campbells are interrogated by Heinrich Himmel, a private detective hired by Ingrid.; Mary explains about Randolph and Ingrid.; Jessica blames herself for all the family's problems and is arrested after evidence found clears Corinne and implicates her.
17	Mr. Franklin #1 (Howard Hesseman).	January 17, 1978	17
Jessica goes to jail, causing Ingrid to gloat.; Burt is behaving obsessively about Peter's murder, causing the Campbells much worry.; The Campbells are informed by Ingrid about Jessica's arrest.; Danny is let off the hook by Mr. Lefkowitz on the condition that Danny agrees to marry Elaine.; Eunice is disturbed to learn someone is blackmailing Congressman McCallum about his affair with her.; Benson poses as Jessica's lawyer to bring her breakfast.; Chester hires a lawyer to defend Jessica, who admits that the gun that killed Peter does belong to her, and the lawyer refuses to take the case, but advises that Jessica plead guilty because the outcome will be the same.
18	E. Ronald Mallu (Eugene Roche).	January 24, 1978	18
Father Tim tells Corinne that he's going on a religious retreat in Canada so he can forget about her, and Corinne kisses him.; Burt is confronted by Mary about his emotional problems; Burt tells Mary that he can make himself invisible, which is the result of a nervous breakdown due to Peter's death.; Chester hires E. Ronald Mallu to represent Jessica.; Jessica tries to leave the country while out on bail, but Benson talks her out of it; Mary convinces her that she's loved and needed.; Chester fires Claire and leaves her, so she throws a tantrum and turns him in to the SEC.
19	None.	February 7, 1978	19
The Tates and Campbells are interviewed by E. Ronald Mallu, who is looking in vain for acceptable character witnesses.; Mary is advised by a psychiatrist to have Burt hospitalized for observation.; Corinne is visited by Jessica, who makes a heart-felt plea for her to return home, but Ingrid seeks to poison her mind against Jessica.; Eunice is shocked as Congressman McCallum receives compromising pictures from the blackmailer. She climbs out on a ledge to avoid being caught by Marilyn, then is in a difficult position as a courier comes to pick up McCallum's speech and walks off with the pictures instead
20	Mr. Franklin #2 (Howard Hesseman), Judge Anthony Petrillo (Charles Lane).	February 14, 1978	20
Eunice climbs off the ledge and into a stranger's hotel room; Congressman McCallum promises her a new life but backs out when the courier returns the pictures.; Jodie confronts Chuck about the nasty notes he's been getting from Bob.; Danny tries to break off with Elaine; Mr. Lefkowitz tells him that he has to marry Elaine, much to Danny's disbelief and absolute horror.; Burt learns that Mary intends to have him committed.; Jessica begins her pre-trial hearings in the murder case and is shocked to learn the prosecutor in Peter's murder case turns out to be the twin brother of the lawyer who refused to defend Jessica; it is also revealed that the judge once lost $40,000 because of bad advice he got from Chester.
21	Carol David (Rebecca Balding).	February 21, 1978	21
Danny brings Elaine home to meet the dysfunctional Campbell family, in an attempt to get her uninterested in him.; Corinne breaks into Father Tim's retreat cabin.; Jessica locks herself in the bathroom to avoid going to trial.; Jodie meets Carol David, E. Ronald Mallu's assistant and is immediately propositioned by her.; Jessica is nervous as her trial begins.
22	None.	February 28, 1978	22
Jodie is convinced by Carol to go away for the weekend, despite his insistence that they can only be friends.; Burt checks into the mental hospital.; Danny explains to Mary why he has to marry Elaine.; Billy runs away from home because he failed math and doesn't want to add to the family problems.; Jessica goes through with her defense at the trial; Benson, Chester and Jessica herself testify; the prosecutor boasts that his surprise witness will make the jury want to lynch her.
23	Flo Flotsky (Doris Roberts)	March 14, 1978	23
Eunice is dumped by Congressman McCallum after Marilyn threatens to ruin his political career.; Burt confesses to Mary that he killed her first husband.; Ingrid has a sexual encounter with the judge in Jessica's trial.; Corinne walks out after learning of Ingrid's vendetta against the Tates.; Father Tim tells his mother that he may leave the priesthood because of Corinne, but she doesn't take it well.; Jessica is asked by Mallu if she knows who the surprise witness might be; the surprise witness turns out to be Mrs. Fein, who testifies that she heard Jessica threaten to kill Peter
24	None.	March 21, 1978	24
Jodie finds himself in bed with Carol.; Mary can't decide how she feels about Burt when he comes home from the hospital.; Jodie tells Carol that he won't have sex with her again.; Jessica is the only person in the Tate household who gets any sleep after Mrs. Fein's testimony in court.; Corinne realizes that Jessica is her true mother; Ingrid comes to reconcile with her, but she refuses to go with Ingrid.; Chester is arrested by Chief Tinkler for stock fraud.; Jessica has her murder case go to the jury.
25	None.	March 28, 1978	25
Danny is frightened as Mr. Lefkowitz threatens to kill the Campbells if he runs away from his responsibility to marry Elaine.; Mary finally decides that she would've been more devastated if Burt had been the one to die instead of Johnny.; Father Tim tells Corinne that he is leaving the priesthood, but refuses to be intimate with her until they are married.; Jodie is convinced by Carol that they should live together, but Dennis resurfaces, and announces that he wants Jodie back.; Jessica admits to Chester that she's scared about what the jury might decide.; Mallu tells Jessica that he is in love with her.; Jessica is found guilty by the jury.; Peter is revealed to have been murdered, not by Jessica, but by either Chester, Jodie, Corinne, Benson, or Burt

=== Season 2 (1978–79) ===
No.	Focal characters introduced in the episode	Original release date	Or.
1	None.	September 14, 1978	26 (first half)
The Tates and Campbells insinuate who might have murdered Peter.; Chester attempts suicide due to his grief about Jessica's situation – as well as his own – but only succeeds at giving himself a bump on the head.; Jodie and Carol move in together, with Burt and Danny's help. Dennis brings a housewarming gift, causing Carol to experience some jealousy.; Mary is concerned about a comment Jessica makes which implies that Burt might be having an affair.; Jessica is told by Mallu that he will do whatever it takes to exonerate her and tells Benson to put on a strong face in light of her situation, for everyone else's sake.; Tim and Corinne visit Tim's mother, who is so distressed at Corinne's encouragement of Tim's leaving the priesthood that she puts a curse on them.; Jessica appeals to the real killer to step forward before the judge pronounces sentence.
2	Dutch Leitner (Donnelly Rhodes).	September 14, 1978	26 (second half)
Jessica is sentenced to 50 years in prison for the murder of Peter.; Chester confesses to having murdered Peter and explains to Jessica that he had repressed all memory of the murder, but it came back to him when he got bumped on the head during his suicide attempt.; Jessica urges the children not to stop loving their father.; Chester gets put in the same cell with Dutch, another convicted murderer.; Burt convinces Mary that he is not having an affair.; Jessica visits Chester in jail and is subsequently bullied by Dutch into helping him escape.; Danny tells Jodie that his attempt to fake impotence didn't fool Elaine.; Carol is pregnant with Jodie's baby but doesn't gain the strength to tell him.
3	Aunt Esther (Florence Halop).	September 21, 1978	27
Chester and Dutch overpower their guard and escape.; Burt asks Danny to be his partner in the construction business.; Danny faces his wedding day with trepidation, as he detests his wife-to-be, Elaine, who Danny's family agrees with.; Elaine is also found detestable by her mobster father, Mr. Lefkowitz, who surprises everyone by announcing at the wedding reception that he's cutting her off, forcing them to move in with Burt and Mary.; Dutch and Chester continue their escape.; Jodie prepares to move out, fed up with Carol's homophobic behavior, until she tells Jodie she's pregnant and plans to keep the baby.; The Tates learn of Chester's escape, and Sheriff Tinkler vows to change the escape inmates.; One by one, Benson, Billy, Eunice, Corinne and Jessica all disappear into the basement.
4	None.	September 28, 1978	28
Chester and Dutch are discovered hiding in the basement.; The Campbells have trouble tolerating Elaine.; Eunice is frightened by Dutch in her bedroom, but after a brief standoff, they discover they like each other.; Chuck makes an unsuccessful attempt to go on a date without Bob.; Jodie tells Burt and Mary that Carol is pregnant.; Eunice wakes up in bed next to Dutch, and the two create a "special connection" with each other.; Mary and Jessica compare family scandals.; Tim and Corinne get married, but Mrs. Flotsky, somewhat unsurprisingly, chooses not to hold her peace at the wedding
5	None.	October 5, 1978	29
Jessica gives Corinne advice about marriage.; Chester is going insane from being cooped up in the basement.; Tim and Corinne face a series of obstacles on their wedding night.; Mary tells Burt that she wants to go back to school.; Burt and Danny hatch a scheme to tame Elaine.; Chester has a seizure.; Dutch runs away.; Rather than tell the police the truth about holding a fugitive, they plant Chester on their doorstep to make it appear he had just arrived and pressed the doorbell.
6	Sally (Caroline McWilliams), Dr. Kanter (Ron Rifkin).	October 12, 1978	30
Chester is taken to the hospital where he remains in a coma.; Eunice discusses her feelings for Dutch with Jessica, who has mixed emotions about it all.; Danny follows Burt's advice to "kill Elaine with kindness" (implied to be a reference to Shakespeare's The Taming of the Shrew).; Jodie proposes to Carol, to take responsibility as the father of their child.; Tim and Corinne are shocked as Mrs. Flotsky, who has a history of claiming that Tim's independent choices will kill her, actually does drop dead.; Danny and Burt each find themselves a target for seduction by the construction company's secretary, Sally.; Chester needs brain surgery because of a tumor, which turns out to be what caused him to kill Peter and then forget all about it.; Jessica decides to go through the brain surgery, even though it could cause Chester to lose most of his memory.
7	Professor Anatole Martins (Lee Bergere).	October 19, 1978	31
Tim, still reeling from the death of his mother, concludes that he's cursed.; Mary is pleased that her college professor, Professor Martins, is showing an interest in her, but Burt is jealous.; Dutch climbs in Eunice's window to be her midnight lover, despite the fact that he is still fleeing the authorities as an escaped convict.; Jodie and Carol find their marriage plans vigorously opposed by Dennis.; Burt tells Elaine how Danny really feels about her.; Mary suggests to Danny that he should try being nice to Elaine.; Danny and Elaine see each other in a new light.; Chester survives the brain surgery, but loses his memory
8	"Boomer" David (Michael Conrad).	November 2, 1978	32
The Tates visit Chester in the hospital.; Jodie and Carol tell Carol's father, Mr. David, about her pregnancy and their impending marriage.; Elaine reveals to Danny why she acts the way she does.; Burt and Mary talk about why Burt works so hard.; Sally continues to attempt to seduce Burt, but still to no avail.
9	None.	November 9, 1978	33
Chester comes home after a brain operation but is a long way from being as mentally sharp as he was previously.; Jodie has a fight with Dennis and is sufficiently provoked to slug him.; Dutch and Eunice decide to run away together.; Corinne tells Jessica that she's pregnant.; Mary is kissed by her college professor Dr. Martins, who, it turned out, was interested in her for being more than just his student; Mary does not return the professor's interest and tries to fend off his advances.; Burt walks in on Mary and her professor at exactly the wrong moment, and believes Mary is cheating on him; shocked by what he believes he has seen, he gets drunk; after a series of missteps, he ends up spending the night in Sally's apartment
10	None.	November 23, 1978	34
Burt wakes up next to Sally, much to his horror.; Tim faces his first day working for Burt's construction company.; Chester is so addled by the aftereffects of his brain surgery that he thinks he's Marlene Dietrich.; Burt lies to Mary about why he was out all night.; Mary and Elaine share a tender moment at the makeup table.; Tim has an awful day at work and decides the construction business is not for him.; The Tate and Campbell women throw a bridal shower for Carol.; Mary tells Jessica that Burt is having an affair.
11	None.	November 30, 1978	35
Dutch and Eunice say their goodbyes to Jessica and Chester, as they are leaving together to go into hiding.; Chester agonizes over his lost memory.; Mary is troubled, and Jodie guesses at what's troubling her.; Burt tries to break off with Sally; it is revealed that Sally's interest in Burt is merely part of a malicious plot against him.; Chester disappears without a trace, in his confused condition.; Elaine gets kidnapped by the mob, just as Danny's relationship with her begins to blossom.
12	Detective George Donohue (John Byner).	December 7, 1978	36
The Campbells are in a panic because of Elaine's kidnapping.; Jessica hires Detective George Donohue for the job of finding Chester.; Corinne learns that her pregnancy is much further along than she can explain.; Jodie has trouble directing a TV commercial when Carol and Dennis compete for his attention on the set.; Burt and Danny negotiate with the kidnappers.
13	None.	December 14, 1978	37
Danny is allowed by the kidnappers to speak on the phone to Elaine.; Eunice and Dutch find their hideout cabin a bit too rustic.; Detective Donohue declares his love for Jessica.; Burt and Mary are emotional wrecks on the day of Jodie's marriage to Carol.; Danny and Jodie reminisce about their childhood.; Carol fails to show up for the wedding, much to Jodie's dismay.
14	None.	December 21, 1978	38
Burt and Danny rehearse the ransom drop.; Elaine gets shot while escaping from the kidnappers.; Corinne tells Tim about her unexplainable five-month pregnancy and Tim doesn't believe the baby is his.; Mary and Burt confront their mutual misunderstandings and reconcile.; Jessica tells Detective Donohue that she loves him, too, but of course cannot act on those feelings due to her marriage to Chester; Benson, out of concern for Jessica, warns Donohue to watch his step.; Jodie assures a fearful Mary he won't attempt suicide again.; Elaine dies in the arms of her horrified husband Danny (Dinah Manoff's last appearance on the show, though she would work with Susan Harris and Richard Mulligan again on Empty Nest a decade later).
15	None.	January 4, 1979	39
Burt asks Sally to find another job; Sally reacts badly to this suggestion.; The Tates visit Dutch and Eunice at the hideaway cabin, with the police not far behind.; Danny sets out to find Elaine's killers, with Burt in tow.; Detective Donohue finds Chester's wallet at the scene of a train wreck, and tells Jessica that Chester is dead.; Chester is in fact still alive and wandering around the world aimlessly, currently in Toledo; he manages for a moment to regain his memory, only to promptly lose it again.
16	Lurleen David (Peggy Pope).	January 11, 1979	40
The Tates and Campbells share their memories of Chester, believing him to be dead on the basis of Detective Donohue's information.; Sally tells Mary that Burt is having an affair with both her and an 18-year-old girl.; Jodie meets Mrs. David, Carol's mother.; Carol tells Jodie that she doesn't want him to be the father of her baby.; Chester still wandering around aimlessly, manages to remember that his name is Lester Pate – or something like that.
17	Alice (Randee Heller).	January 18, 1979	41
Burt, Danny, Jodie and Chuck drown their sorrows at a bar.; Tim announces that he's going to become a hermit.; Dutch is captured by the police.; Jodie befriends Alice, a suicidal lesbian.; Mary leaves Burt and moves in with the Tates.; Eunice comes home.; Corinne goes into labor.
18	None.	February 1, 1979	42
Corinne gives birth to a boy.; Mary violently confronts Burt about Sally's accusations.; Burt vows to prove himself innocent.; Donohue stumbles through his first date with Jessica.; Jodie invites Alice to become his roommate.; Chester regains his memory and sets out for Connecticut.
19	None.	February 8, 1979	43
Corinne brings her new baby home, and the baby's cries keep everybody at the Tate house awake.; Jessica tells Mary about her date with Donohue.; Burt learns that Ingrid has been blackmailing Sally to get her to pretend that she and Burt have consummated an affair, which they actually have not.; Danny asks Jodie to help Mary and Burt resolve their problems.; Jessica and Donohue spend the night together.; Chester returns home, much to Jessica and Donahue's dismay.
20	Lisa (Ruth Cox), the Devil's Voice (Tim McIntire).	February 15, 1979	44
Jessica and Donohue agonize about the future of their relationship, with the facts that Jessica is in love with two men and the return of Chester.; Jessica tells Chester about her affair with Donohue, much to the pleasure of laughter.; Billy is attracted to a classmate named Lisa, who lures him into a religious cult called the Sunnies.; Eunice urges Dutch to turn state's evidence so he can be freed from jail and can be with her.; Sally confesses to Mary that she lied about Burt's affairs and gets them back together.; Corinne's baby exhibits ominous and demonic behavior.
21	Mel (Frank Coppola), Dave (Greg Antonacci).	March 1, 1979	45
Chester reacclimates himself to life in the Tate household.; When Chester finds out that Jessica is head over heels in love with Donohue, he asks her for another chance for the man she married in the first place.; Jodie introduces Alice to the Campbell family.; Danny gets a tip about Elaine's killers.; Corinne's baby displays telekinetic powers and speaks full sentences.; Danny and Burt track the killers, Mel and Dave.; Corinne tells Tim that the baby is possessed.; Burt sees a flying saucer, but Danny doesn't believe him, much to Burt's shock.
22	None.	March 8, 1979	46
Burt begs Mary to believe that he really saw a UFO, who believes that Burt did see something, but not a spaceship.; Billy is confronted by Benson about his involvement with the Sunnies, who promises Benson he won't get possessed by them but also is crazy about Lisa.; Jessica tells Donohue that she's still undecided about their relationship and can't choose between Chester and him, but she will make a decision soon.; Tim comes home and learns first-hand what's been happening with the baby.; Jodie and Alice, jealous of each other's dates, unbelievably decide to date each other.; Tim believes that confronting the baby's demon is the key to his own redemption but tells the others that he will need help confronting the demon.; Benson decides to join Tim in confronting the baby's demon.
23	Millie (Candice Azzara), Reverend Sung (Michael DeLano).	March 15, 1979	47
The Tates prepare to exorcise the baby's demon.; Corinne believes that the baby is possessed because she slept with everyone in Dunn's River.; Danny confronts Mel, the mobster who murdered Elaine, but gets clobbered by Mel's girlfriend, Millie, and Mel tells Millie that he plans to kill him too.; Billy is not allowed to go home by the Sunnies.; Jessica confronts the demon possessing Corinne's baby, which runs away screaming.; Jessica calls Chester and Donohue together to deliver her decision about which of the two men she will remain with.; Burt is abducted by aliens Note: In 2005, this episode was ranked number 88 as part of TV Land's "Top 100 Most Unexpected Moments in TV History".

=== Season 3 (1979–80) ===
No.	Focal characters introduced in the episode	Original release date	Or.
1	None.	September 13, 1979	48
Jessica chooses Chester over Donohue, but offers to let Donohue stay in the Tate house until he recovers from the shock; Burt wakes up in the alien ship, where they tell him that they plan to replace him with a replica who hasn't had sex in 2000 years; Jodie is introduced to his newborn daughter, Wendy, by Carol's mother, Mrs. David, who shows up with the child at Jodie's apartment; Benson comes back to tell the Tates that Billy is being held captive by the Sunnies; Benson, Chester, Donohue and the Major prepare to rescue Billy from the Sunnies; Burt's alien double, "Alien Burt" teleports to Earth and moves in with the unsuspecting Mary
2	Saul (Jack Gilford)	September 20, 1979	49
Alien Burt proves to be a sexual juggernaut with Mary; Billy is indoctrinated by the Sunnies, which use torture and deprivation to bend him to their will; Jodie is told by Mrs. David that Carol has run off with another man, and offers him custody of Wendy – if he agrees to kick Alice out of his apartment; The real Burt meets Saul, another captive of the aliens, who claims to have been captured by them 4,000 years ago; Eunice talks Dutch out of escaping from jail; Benson, Chester, Donohue and the Major invade the Sunnies compound, only to be captured themselves
3	None.	September 27, 1979	50
Billy rescues the team – Benson, Chester, Donohue and the Major – which had organized to rescue him; The Tates celebrate Billy's return home; The real Burt receives an offer of help from Saul to escape from the aliens; Alice and Jodie say their goodbyes, in order to satisfy Mrs. David's requirement for Jodie receiving custody of Wendy; Mary tells Jessica that she senses that Burt isn't really Burt; Burt and Saul beam themselves off the spaceship; Benson leaves to take a new job – as the governor's aide on Benson)
4	Leslie Walker (Marla Pennington).	October 4, 1979	51
Burt and Saul beam themselves into and out of nasty situations in the past history of the Earth, end up in front a Mexican firing squad, and vanish into thin air; Donohue finally leaves the Tate household; Jessica, Mary, Eunice, and Corinne can't get any sleep because of Chester, Alien Burt, Dutch, and Tim; Millie helps Danny escape from the barn; he promises to marry her; Chester begins to revert to his old cheating ways by planning a rendezvous with another woman; Billy stays afterschool to study with his high-school teacher, Leslie Walker, and the two share a passionate kiss
5	None.	October 11, 1979	52
Dutch gets out of jail and moves in with the Tates; Danny brings Millie home to meet the Campbells; Jodie is thrilled as Mrs. David leaves Wendy in his care; Saul decides to stay with the aliens, but sends Burt home; The real Burt and Alien Burt have a traumatic first encounter; Billy and Leslie decide to pursue a relationship
6	None.	November 1, 1979	53
The real Burt calls Mary from a pay phone and asks her to meet him at the corner drugstore; Millie tells Danny that Alien Burt has been accosting her; Alien Burt diverts Mary from meeting with Real Burt; Jessica accuses Chester of cheating on her again, which he shoots down almost immediately; Eunice tells Corinne that she's lost interest in Dutch; Eunice and Corinne see Chester having an intimate lunch with somebody who isn't Jessica, which Eunice doesn't believe is Chester; Billy and Leslie go to a secluded restaurant, where they see Eunice with somebody who isn't Dutch, and Chester, with somebody who isn't Jessica, sees them; Tim leaves Corinne to go back to the priesthood
7	None.	November 8, 1979	54
The Tates have a party to welcome Dutch into their home; Mary tells Jessica that Burt's trying to drive her crazy; Millie decides that Danny's family is too strange for her, and leaves him; Billy meets Leslie's ex-husband, Charlie, and defends Leslie from him; The real Burt calls Mary again; Corinne and Jodie compare notes on the stresses of single parenthood; Alien Burt refuses to beam back to the spaceship; Mary meets the real Burt at the drugstore, only to see him vanish when he is abruptly rebeamed to the spaceship; The real Burt begs the aliens for a chance to reason with Alien Burt; The aliens give a chance but tell him that if he fails, he will get beamed there forever
8	None.	November 22, 1979	55
Dutch cooks dinner for the Tates; Mary spouts gibberish about having seen Burt disappear; Corinne and Eunice confront Chester about his womanizing; Corinne threatens to tell Jessica; The real Burt turns to Jodie for help; Billy is persuaded by Leslie not to book a hotel room for them; lies for Eunice when Dutch shows up at the hotel, hinting that Eunice is cheating on him; Eunice, Corinne & Chester are all at the hotel as well, each with someone other than their respective other; The real Burt convinces Alien Burt to give him his life back
9	Polly Dawson (Lynne Moody).	December 6, 1979	56
Jessica finds about Billy and his affair with Leslie; Burt convinces Mary that she was living with a sex-crazy alien; Danny makes friends with a recently widowed black woman named Polly, while visiting Elaine's grave; Dutch lets Eunice know he heard her confessions to Corinne and Billy about cheating by pouring oatmeal on her head and threatens her about cheating again; Mary tries to explain to Jessica about Alien Burt at a hotel; Jessica follows Chester after seeing him with another woman
10	None.	December 13, 1979	57
Jessica tells Chester not to come home after catching him and his latest mistress in a hotel room; Burt and Mary get a routine medical exam, hoping the doctor can cure Burt's insomnia; Danny tells Burt and Jodie about his infatuation with Polly, much to Burt's concern about it, and the public's reaction to the relationship; Jessica meets Leslie, despite her misgivings about Billy's involvement with his high-school teacher; Jodie has his fitness to care for Wendy challenged by the Child Welfare Department
11	None.	December 27, 1979	58
Jessica agrees to let Chester live in the guest room, when he promises to get help for his problem with infidelity; Jodie has trouble finding a nanny for Wendy; Mary considers this an opportunity to ask him to move back home with his parents; The real Burt feels insecure about living up to Alien Burt's sexual performance; Billy has his 18th birthday party, but the festivities are strained by Jessica's anger at Chester and Dutch's mistrust of Eunice; Jodie agrees to move back home with his parents; Leslie announces that she's quitting her job so she and Billy can pursue their relationship more freely
12	Gloria (Colleen Riley).	January 3, 1980	59
The Campbells welcome Jodie back home; Jessica and Chester consult a minister about their marital problems; Chester is committed to reforming his promiscuous ways, but is tempted by the minister's daughter, Gloria; Danny meets Polly's family, but Polly's brother Eddie disapproves of him; Mary is pregnant, according to their doctor; Burt has a terminal illness, also according to their doctor
13	None.	January 10, 1980	60
Burt doesn't tell Mary that he's dying; Danny and Polly tell each other "I love you"; Billy finds a new pastime with Leslie; Danny is torn by his feelings for Polly and his fears about being in an interracial romance in a world which is less than tolerant of such things; Mary comes to the ghastly realization that Alien Burt might be the father of her baby
14	None.	January 17, 1980	61
Danny learns that Burt is dying; Burt expresses a desire to get himself in the Guinness Book of Records before he dies, to make sure that he has done something notable with his life; Eunice asks Corinne to cover for her so she can continue to cheat on Dutch; Chester is seduced by Gloria, the minister's daughter; Polly brings her family to the Campbell family home for dinner, and misunderstandings between the two families abound; Jessica throws Chester out permanently, after he confesses to cheating on her again with Gloria
15	None.	January 24, 1980	62
Mary confronts Burt about his odd behavior in the pursuit of getting in the Guinness Book; Dutch turns to Corinne for advice about Eunice; Jessica seeks out Donohue, only to learn that he has married another woman since they last saw each other; Jessica tells Mary and Rose about her chaotic love life; Dutch blows up at Eunice
16	Dr. Alan Posner (Allan Miller).	January 31, 1980	63
Carol drops in to see Wendy; Jessica consults Dr. Posner, a psychiatrist, about her problems, and he shares her frustration about having an unfaithful partner; Burt is told by his doctor that there was a clerical mistake and that it's not him that is dying after all; Billy is starting to get tired of Leslie; Corinne comforts Dutch after Eunice runs away
17	R.C. (Ted Shackelford).	February 7, 1980	64
Burt is overjoyed that he's not going to die; Gloria, the minister's daughter tells Chester that he's too old for her, and leaves her; Danny and Polly go house-hunting; Dutch and Corinne end up in bed together, much to Jessica's shock; Dr. Posner drops Jessica as a patient so he can ask her for a date; Carol tells Jodie that she intends to sue him for custody of Wendy
18	None.	February 28, 1980	65
Burt announces that he wants to run for Sheriff of Dunn's River, much to Mary's shock; Danny wants to serve as Deputy to Burt; Jodie hires Mallu to help him fight Carol in court; Jessica invites Dr. Posner over for dinner; Leslie fears she is losing Billy; Jessica refuses to let Chester come home; Dr. Posner professes his love for Jessica
19	Saunders (Roscoe Lee Browne).	March 6, 1980	66
Danny and Polly move into a suburban home, where they face both latent and overt racism from their new neighbors; Leslie threatens suicide when Billy tries to end their relationship; The Campbells are depressed about the prospect of Jodie's losing custody of Wendy; Jessica hires Saunders to replace Benson as the new butler for the Tate household; The Tate and Campbell families wait for the results of Burt's election for sheriff, who believes his accidental vote for Sheriff Prentice will cost him the election; Jessica passes out cold
20	Dr. Hill (Granville Van Dusen), Judge Betty Small (Rae Allen), F. Peter Haversham (Michael Durrell).	March 13, 1980	67
Jessica is brought to the hospital after her collapse during Burt's election day gathering; Dr. Hill, Jessica's new doctor, tells Chester that Jessica is very sick; Jessica asks Chester to move back home while she's in the hospital; Burt finds out he is now sheriff, and that Sheriff Prentice has committed fraud to get reelected against him, so his first assignment as sheriff is to remove his predecessor from office; Corinne convinces Dutch not to move out; Carol tells an outrageous lie in court about Jodie threatening to kill her, in order to convince the judge to award her custody of Wendy
21	None.	March 20, 1980	68
Burt successfully talks the old sheriff into relinquishing his office; Mary tells Jodie that her baby might be an alien; The Tates wait for news about Jessica's condition; Leslie threatens to commit suicide again; Eunice returns home and catches Dutch in bed with Corinne; Jessica is told by Dr. Hill that she's dying
22	None	March 27, 1980	69 (first half)
Jessica forgives Chester for all of his past affairs and lies; Jodie bursts in a fury of rage when Carol and Mrs. David lie about him on the witness stand; Mary is unable to tell Burt that the baby might be an alien; Dutch is forced by Corinne and Eunice to choose between them; Jodie speaks his mind in court
23	Elmore Tibbs (Hamilton Camp).	March 27, 1980	69 (second half)
Danny proposes to Polly, who must think about their marriage; Jessica has everyone emotional, even the Major, when she sends a taped message home; Leslie decides to kill Billy instead of killing herself; Burt and Danny stand up to Tibbs, who have them knocked out; Jessica is besieged in her hospital room by four suitors – Chester, Mallu, Dr. Posner...and now Dr. Hill; Mary goes into labor; Benson drops in to visit Jessica in the hospital; Jessica dies in the hospital

=== Season 4 (1980–81) ===
This season was originally shown as 16 episodes, of which six were one hour in length. When the one-hour episodes were standardized into half-hour episodes this yielded 22 episodes. The plot's end has been unclear, and this due to the cancellation of the projected 5th season.

No.	Focal characters introduced in the episode	Original release date	Or.
1	None.	November 12, 1980	70 (first half)
Jessica is revived by the emergency team and Dr. Hill, who warns Chester that Jessica may have suffered irreversible brain damage as her brain was denied oxygen during her death; she remains in a coma; Burt and Danny wake up in bed together in the sleazy motel. Elmore Tibbs had drugged them and placed them there. they dress in drag to leave the motel; Mary gives birth to a son, Scotty; Leslie tries to shoot Billy, but grazes Saunders instead; Mary is relieved to learn that the baby isn't silver-colored and resembling an alien; Burt and Danny lie to Mary about their misadventure in the motel room; Burt meets his new son; Jessica describes heaven while mumbling incoherently during her coma; Dr. Hill tells the family that although she may have fought off the virus, Jessica could be in a coma for the rest of her life
2	None.	November 12, 1980	70 (second half)
Corinne loses Dutch to Eunice, and tells him that she plans to move away; Jessica recovers from her coma; Jessica meets Scotty; Judge Small awards custody of Wendy to Jodie because Mrs. David committed perjury; Carol threatens revenge to Jodie by vowing to make him wish that he never had a daughter; Mary isn't completely sure the baby isn't an alien; Jessica tells Mary she's been to heaven; Tibbs sends Burt and Danny copies of photos of them with six naked women, and a blackmail threat
3	None.	November 19, 1980	71
Jessica turns down all of her suitors; Burt decides to give in to Tibbs; Polly tells Danny she's not in love with him, and leaves him; Corinne informs Jessica that she is moving to California; The Campbells throw a welcome home party for Mary and Burt's son, Scotty; Burt decides to stand up to Tibbs after all; Jodie discovers that Wendy has been kidnapped
4	None.	November 26, 1980	72
Burt tells Jodie that although Carol kidnapped Wendy, she did nothing illegal; Jessica finally returns home; Dutch and Eunice announce that they're getting married. Chester is mortified but Jessica is relieved; Leslie tries to kill the entire Tate family with a bomb; Dutch earns the respect of Chester when he almost sacrifices himself with the bomb; Jessica tells Mary that she and Chester are getting a divorce; Mary shows Jessica the blackmail pictures that Burt and Danny "posed in" with the six naked ladies; Jessica tells Mary to talk to Burt about the blackmail photos; Chester finally gets the message that he and Jessica are over; is exiled to the pool house, if he pays his rent and gets a job as gardener
5	Annie Selig (Nancy Dolman), Carlos "El Puerco" Valdez (Gregory Sierra).	December 3, 1980	73
Dutch and Eunice get married; Chester is taken with Annie Selig, Eunice's maid of honor; Burt is mortified as the blackmail photos of him and Danny show up in the newspaper; the family faces the public's outrage, as well as each other's; Mary finally learns about Tibbs' blackmailing Danny and Burt; Mary and Burt make a vow to prove Burt's innocence; Annie moves into the pool house with Chester as they are now dating, which Eunice disapproves of; Jessica announces her plans to go on a get-well vacation to the little-known country of Malaguay; Jessica frees Carlos "El Puerco" Valdez, a Malaguayan counter-revolutionary who is sitting in a nearby seat on her plane; El Puerco immediately hijacks the plane and takes her hostage because she helped him escape
6	Maggie Chandler (Barbara Rhoades).	December 10, 1980	74
Billy sets out to rescue Jessica from El Puerco; Jodie hires Maggie Chandler, a private detective, to help him find Carol and Wendy; The Campbells agonize over Burt's scandal, Wendy's kidnapping and now Jessica's abduction; Burt proposes launching a sting operation in a brothel; Jessica is led by El Puerco safely through the jungles, and wars, of Malaguay
7	Gwen (Jesse Welles).	December 17, 1980	75
Burt and Danny in their capacity as undercover police officers, check into one of the brothels run by Elmore Tibbs; Danny meets a hooker named Gwen, and asks her to testify against Tibbs; Unbeknownst to Danny and Gwen, someone is spying on them; The Tates find themselves low on money; Billy isn't home when Leslie drops by with a rattlesnake; Jessica is asked by El Puerco to spend the night with him, but he refuses to be intimate with her until they are married
8	Juan One (Joe Mantegna).	December 31, 1980	76
Jessica talks El Puerco and his lieutenant – "Juan One", one of his many subordinates named Juan – into escaping the enemy by boat; Gwen gives her deposition against Tibbs; Someone is still spying on Gwen and Danny; Chester tries to auction off the household furnishings to make money, as Dutch loses his car washing job; The Tates receive news that Jessica and Billy may not be alive; Burt and Mary try to work out a schedule for their love life; Jodie and Maggie learn that Carol has run away with a circus clown to Lompoc
9	None.	January 7, 1981	77
Burt agrees to sell his construction company to Chester and Dutch; Jessica and El Puerco row to Jessica's home in Connecticut; Jodie and Maggie learn that Carol has run off with a Mexican fire-eater; Billy rescues Jessica and El Puerco; Danny asks Gwen to stop hooking
10	None.	January 14, 1981	78
El Puerco and Juan One move into the Tate house; Danny asks Gwen to move in with the Campbells, because someone may be trying to kill her; Jodie and Maggie learn that Carol has gone to Alaska, and admit they're attracted to each other; Burt consults a minister for guidance, and bores the minister to death
11	None.	January 21, 1981	79
Danny tells Mary that he's in love with Gwen; Jessica tells Mary that her divorce from Chester is official, and that El Puerco won't have sex with her; she later throws a dinner party for El Puerco; Chester announces that he and Annie are engaged, and that he and Jessica are divorced; Jodie announces that he and Maggie are an item; Danny announces that he and Gwen are in love; Leslie makes another murder attempt on the Tates; Danny is shot by an unseen assailant
12	None.	January 28, 1981	80
The Campbells wait an update of Danny's condition; Chester and Annie plan their future as a married couple; Jessica tries to entice El Puerco into compromising his sexual principles, but he doesn't give in; Gwen tells Danny that she loves him; Burt promises to take revenge against Tibbs for shooting Danny; Danny needs a kidney transplant; Burt goes to find Tibbs; Mary reveals to Jodie that he and Danny had different fathers; It is revealed that Danny's father is either Chester, Benson, Burt Reynolds, or the man spying on Gwen and Danny
13	Maggie Chandler (Barbara Rhoades), Dr. Drell (Earl Boen), Godfather (J.J. Barry), Girl in Towel (Sandy Barry), Informer (Herbie Braha), Man in Towel (Ross Borden), Elmore Tibbs (Hamilton Camp), Nurse (Barbara Goodson), Warrior No. 1 (Hard Boiled Haggerty), Hooker (Stephanie Harker).	March 9, 1981	81 (first half)
Jodie and Maggie learn that Wendy is being held at a kung-fu fortress; Burt attacks Tibbs with a bat, and makes one of the biggest busts in organized crime; Mary has no choice but to tell Chester that he is Danny's real father, and asks him to donate a kidney to save Danny's life; If Chester chooses to donate a kidney, everyone will know their secret. If he doesn't, the secret is safe but Danny will die; El Puerco hires a prostitute rather than dishonor Jessica; Mary tells her gynecologist that the baby can fly; he believes Mary is crazy; Jodie and Maggie are captured by martial arts experts while trying to save Wendy
14	None.	March 9, 1981	81 (second half)
Jessica and Danny have a mixture of emotions when they learn that Chester is Danny's real father; Burt becomes a media sensation because of his attack on Tibbs; Chester and Danny face kidney surgery together
15	None.	March 16, 1981	82 (first half)
The Tates and Campbells wait for the results of Danny's surgery; Mary explains to Burt about her relationship with Chester; Jodie proposes to Maggie; Dutch and Eunice play out their wildest sex fantasies; Mary explains to Burt why Chester left her for Jessica
16	None.	March 16, 1981	82 (second half)
Burt alienates his family as his fame continues to grow; Danny is offended when Burt disapproves of his plans to marry Gwen; Jessica forgives Chester, but can't forgive Mary; Saunders proposes a plan to rescue Jodie and Maggie; Gwen is coerced by a hoodlum into spying on Burt and Danny
17	Dr. Rudolph (George Wyner).	March 23, 1981	83 (first half)
Jodie, Maggie, Wendy and Digger are rescued from the fortress by Burt, Chuck, Bob, Billy, El Puerco, Juan One, the Major, Dutch, and Saunders; Jessica finally forgives Mary for her affair with Chester; Mary tells Jessica that she's an alcoholic, the baby may be an alien, and she fears she is losing Burt; Jodie asks Maggie to wait for him to see a psychiatrist to be sure of his relationship with her; Danny blames Burt when Gwen runs away; Although Dr. Rudolph warns Jodie that hypnotherapy is dangerous and that he may get lost in a past life or time period, Jodie signs a waiver for hypnotherapy
18	None.	March 23, 1981	83 (second half)
El Puerco learns a few things about women after spending the night with Jessica; Eunice drives Dutch deliriously crazy with her outrageous fantasies; Chester and Annie announce that they are married, but Chester continues to act possessively toward Jessica. He calls Annie a name, and she walks out on him; Mary walks out on Burt when he doesn't believe that she isn't drunk when she falls down the stairs, but makes friends with the Governor and prepares to make a speech to the Senate; Dutch fails to turn Eunice on with his Cyrano de Bergerac costume; Dr. Rudolph brings Jodie to a past life where he is now stuck as a 90-year-old Jewish man named Julius Kassendorf
19	None.	April 13, 1981	84 (first half)
Burt is offered a job by The Governor, who wants him to become the new Lieutenant Governor; Chester tells Dutch about his jealousy about Jessica and El Puerco; Danny and Annie comfort each other about their insecurities, and come to the understanding that they want to see each other again; Mary tries to convince Burt that their baby is an alien, but he believes she's drunk and crazy; Dr. Rudolph brings Jodie home to the Campbells; they are horrified at Jodie's changes; Burt threatens to sue for malpractice, but Dr. Rudolph explains that it's all perfectly legal because Jodie signed a hypnosis waiver; Dr. Rudolph lets it slip that his transition back to Jodie may not be for years
20	None.	April 13, 1981	84 (second half)
El Puerco challenges Chester to a duel when Chester calls him names; Jessica expresses her concern with Burt and Mary's marriage, and Burt tells her that their marriage may not survive; Danny and Annie find themselves in bed together; Maggie meets Julius, and expresses shock at Jodie's mental transformation; Burt makes political enemies, who plan to kill him, while addressing state Senators
21	General Sandia (Luis Ávalos), Private Esquivo (Barry Vigon)	April 20, 1981	85 (first half)
Burt is asked by The Governor to disassociate himself from the Tates and the rest of the Campbells to get the position of Lieutenant Senator; Jessica is taken hostage by El Puerco's Communist enemies; The Tates get a letter from the kidnappers; they decide to wait for a phone call from them; Julius comforts Mary and all of her troubles; Burt's enemies make their plan to kill Burt
22	None.	April 20, 1981	85 (second half)
Burt receives a tip about a major drug transaction, but he doesn't realize it's a trap; Danny tells Burt he's in love with Annie, much to Burt's concern and horror; The Tates, Dutch and El Puerco worry about Jessica; Chester receives a call from Gen. Sandia and breaks the news to everyone that if El Puerco does not return to Malaguay in 36 hours, Gen. Sandia's forces will kill Jessica; Jessica has her final meal before facing the firing squad, but still defends El Puerco when he doesn't show up; Chester comes back to Annie seeking forgiveness but finds Danny and Annie in bed together, and prepares to kill them both; Burt is about to walk into an ambush; Jessica faces the Malaguayan firing squad
