= Jimmy Baio =

American actor (born 1962)

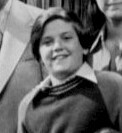
- Baio in 1977
- Born: James Joseph Baio; March 15, 1962 (age 64); Brooklyn, New York, U.S.
- Occupation: Actor
- Years active: 1975–1996
- Relatives: Chris Baio (cousin); Scott Baio (cousin); Harrison Bader (nephew)

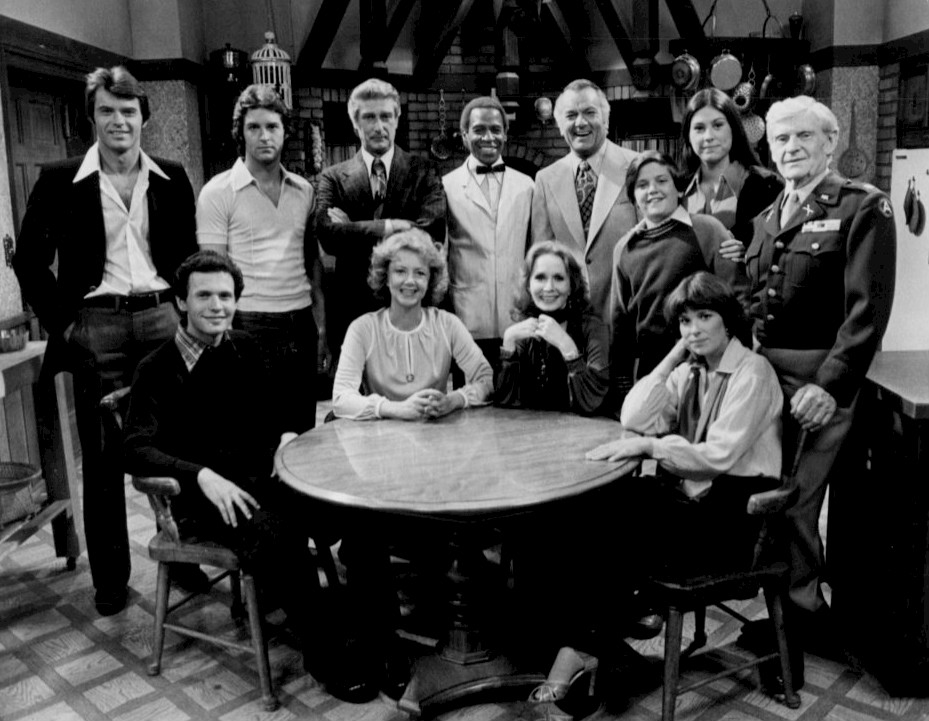
Cast of Soap (1977). Back row, L-R: Robert Urich, Ted Wass, Richard Mulligan, Robert Guillaume, Robert Mandan, Jimmy Baio, Diana Canova, Arthur Peterson Jr. Seated: Billy Crystal, Cathryn Damon, Katherine Helmond, Jennifer Salt.

James Joseph Baio (born March 15, 1962) is an American former actor. He began acting on TV at the age of 13. Baio is best known for playing Billy Tate on Soap. His last role was in the 1996 film The Mirror Has Two Faces.

== Career ==
Baio first appeared onscreen in 1975 at age 13. He made guest appearances on series such as The Facts of Life, Fantasy Island and The Love Boat, but his best known role was as Billy Tate on the comedy series Soap (1977–81).

Baio's other credits include Matlock, Trapper John, M.D., Matt Houston, Too Close for Comfort and Family Feud. Baio, along with Susan Richardson, participated in the Junior Pyramid special of The $20,000 Pyramid in 1979. He also appeared in the comedy movie The Bad News Bears in Breaking Training (1977) as Carmen Ronzonni.

== Personal life ==
He was born in Brooklyn, New York. He is the cousin of actor Scott Baio and Vampire Weekend band member Chris Baio. He is also the uncle of Major League Baseball player Harrison Bader.

== Filmography ==
Year	Title	Role	Notes
1975	Ellery Queen	Graffiti Artist	Episode: "Too Many Suspects"
1975–76	Joe and Sons	Nick Vitale	Main cast (12 episodes)
1976	The Love Boat	Arnold Merritt	Television film
1977	The Bad News Bears in Breaking Training	Carmen Ronzonni	Feature film
1977–81	Soap	Billy Tate	Main cast (63 episodes)
1978	The Love Boat	Norman	Episode: "Rocky/Julie's Dilemma/Who's Who?"
1979	Fantasy Island	Willie Collins	Episode: "Amusement Park/Rock Stars"
1981	Fantasy Island	Jimmy Blair	Episode: "The Lady and the Monster/The Last Cowboy"
1982	The Facts of Life	Buzz Ryan	Episodes: "The Academy", "The Big Fight"
1983	Matt Houston	Jeb Harmon	Episode: "The Yacht Club Murders"
1983	Trapper John, M.D.	Jed	Episode: "South Side Story"
1983	Too Close for Comfort	Freddy Garibaldi	Episode: "Family Business"
1985	Brass	Tony Covello	Television film
1986	Playing for Keeps	Steinberg	Feature film
1987	Matlock	Mark Williams	Episode: "The Rat Pack"
1991	Kiss and Be Killed	Robert	Feature film
1996	The Mirror Has Two Faces	Jimmy the Waiter	Feature film
