= Soap (TV series) =

American sitcom television series (1977–1981)

- Genre: Sitcom
- Created by: Susan Harris
- Starring: Rae Allen; Jimmy Baio; Rebecca Balding; Roscoe Lee Browne; John Byner; Diana Canova; Billy Crystal; Cathryn Damon; Nancy Dolman; Michael Durrell; Robert Guillaume; Katherine Helmond; Howard Hesseman; Jay Johnson; Gordon Jump; Charles Lane; Richard Libertini; Robert Mandan; Dinah Manoff; Caroline McWilliams; Allan Miller; Lynne Moody; Richard Mulligan; Marla Pennington; Arthur Peterson; Barbara Rhoades; Donnelly Rhodes; Eugene Roche; Jennifer Salt; Bob Seagren; Gregory Sierra; Inga Swenson; Robert Urich; Sal Viscuso; Ted Wass; Jesse Welles; Edward Winter
- Narrated by: Rod Roddy
- Theme music composer: George Aliceson Tipton
- Composer: George Aliceson Tipton
- Country of origin: United States
- No. of seasons: 4
- No. of episodes: 85 (93 in syndication) (list of episodes)

Production
- Executive producers: Paul Junger Witt; Tony Thomas
- Producer: Susan Harris
- Production locations: Golden West Videotape Division; The Prospect Studios; Hollywood, California
- Camera setup: Multi-camera
- Running time: 20–24 minutes (77 episodes); 43 minutes (8 episodes)
- Production company: Witt/Thomas/Harris Productions

Original release
- Network: ABC
- Release: September 13, 1977 – April 20, 1981

Related
- Benson

Soap is an American sitcom television series that originally ran on ABC for four seasons, from September 13, 1977, until April 20, 1981. The show was created as a nighttime parody of daytime soap operas, presented as a weekly half-hour prime time comedy. Similar to a soap opera, the show's story was presented in a serial format, and featured melodramatic plotlines including alien abduction, demonic possession, extramarital affairs, murder, kidnapping, unknown diseases, amnesia, cults, organized crime, a communist revolution, and teacher-student relationships.

The show was created, written, and produced by Susan Harris, and also executive produced by Paul Junger Witt and Tony Thomas. Each returning season was preceded by a 90-minute retrospective of the previous season. Two of these retrospectives were made available on VHS in 1994, but were not included on any DVD collections.

85 episodes were broadcast over four seasons. Of these, eight episodes (including the final four) aired as one-hour episodes during the original run on ABC. These hour-long episodes were later split in two, yielding 93 half-hour episodes for syndication. All episodes are available on Region 1 DVD in four box sets. There is a box set of Season 1 on Region 2 DVD. The series has rerun in syndication on local channels as well as on cable.

The show starred Katherine Helmond and Cathryn Damon as sisters and matriarchs of their own families. The cast also included several former soap opera actors. Robert Mandan (Chester Tate) had previously appeared on Search for Tomorrow as a leading man for Mary Stuart; Donnelly Rhodes (Dutch Leitner) had played the first husband of Katherine Chancellor on The Young and the Restless; Arthur Peterson Jr. ("The Major") played Rev. John Ruthledge in the radio version of Guiding Light, while Caroline McWilliams appeared on the television version as Janet Mason Norris; and Marla Pennington (Leslie Walker) appeared for three years as Samantha Livingston Chandler on General Hospital. Additionally, after the series ended, Lynne Moody (Polly Dawson) went on to appear in a recurring capacity on primetime soap opera Knots Landing (which also starred Ted Shackelford, who appeared on Soap in a guest appearance), and Roscoe Lee Browne appeared in a recurring guest role in the seventh season of Falcon Crest.

== Plot ==
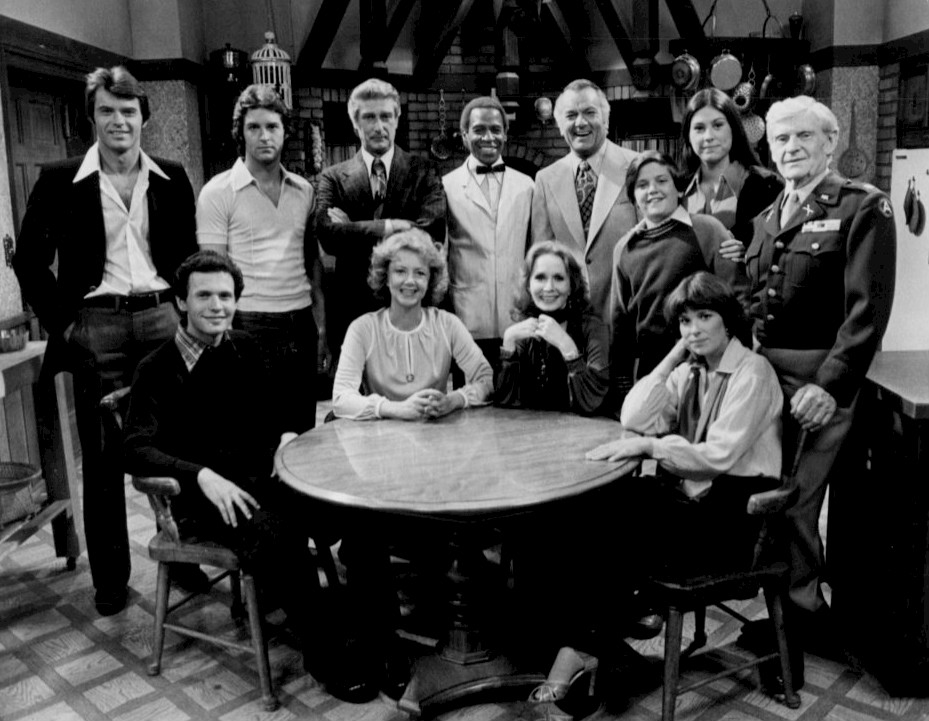
Cast of Soap (1977). Back row, L-R: Robert Urich, Ted Wass, Richard Mulligan, Robert Guillaume, Robert Mandan, Jimmy Baio, Diana Canova, Arthur Peterson Jr. Seated: Billy Crystal, Cathryn Damon, Katherine Helmond, Jennifer Salt.

Soap is set in the fictional town of Dunn's River, Connecticut.

In the opening sequence of the first installment, the announcer says "This is the story of two sisters—Jessica Tate and Mary Campbell". The Tates live in a wealthy neighborhood (the announcer calls it the neighborhood known as "Rich"). Jessica Tate (Katherine Helmond) and her husband, Chester (Robert Mandan), are hardly models of fidelity, as their various love affairs result in several family mishaps, including the murder of Peter Campbell (Robert Urich), the stepson of her sister Mary (Cathryn Damon). Even though everyone tells Jessica about Chester's continual affairs, she does not believe them until she sees his philandering herself. While out to lunch with Mary, Jessica spots Chester necking with his secretary, Claire (Kathryn Reynolds). Heartbroken, Jessica sobs in her sister's arms. On later occasions, it becomes clear that Jess has always known on some level about Chester's affairs but never allowed herself to process the information.

The wealthy Tate family employs a sarcastic butler/cook named Benson (Robert Guillaume). Benson clearly despises Chester, but has a soft spot for their son, Billy (Jimmy Baio). He also gets along with the Tates' daughter Corinne (Diana Canova) as well as their mother, Jessica; but doesn't speak to the other daughter, Eunice (Jennifer Salt), although that later changed. Benson became a popular character and in 1979 left the Tates' employ to work for Jessica's cousin, Governor Gene Gatling, on the spin-off series Benson, wherein his last name, DuBois, was revealed. The Tates had to hire a new butler/cook named Saunders (Roscoe Lee Browne), whose attitude is similar to that of Benson, but has a more formal personality.

Mary's family, the Campbells, are working class, and as the series begins, her son Danny Dallas (Ted Wass), a product of her first marriage to Johnny Dallas, is a junior gangster-in-training. Danny is told to kill his stepfather, Burt Campbell (Richard Mulligan), Mary's current husband, who, Danny is told, murdered his father Johnny, who was also a mobster. It is later revealed that Danny's father was killed by Burt in self-defense. Danny refuses to kill Burt and goes on the run from the Mob in a variety of disguises. This eventually ends when Elaine Lefkowitz (Dinah Manoff), the spoiled daughter of the Mob Boss (Sorrell Booke), falls in love with Danny and stops her father, who then tells Danny he will have to marry Elaine or he will kill him. In the fourth season, it is revealed that Chester is Danny's true father, the product of a secret affair between him and Mary before his marriage to Jessica. Mary's other son, Jodie (Billy Crystal, in an early role), is homosexual, having a secret affair with a famous professional football quarterback, and contemplating a sex-change operation.

The first season ends with Jessica convicted of the murder of Peter Campbell. The announcer concludes the season by announcing that Jessica is innocent, and that one of five characters—Burt, Chester, Jodie, Benson, or Corinne—killed Peter Campbell. Chester later confesses to Peter's murder and is sent to prison. He is soon released after a successful temporary insanity defense, due to a medical condition in his brain. Other plot lines include Jessica's adopted daughter Corinne courting Father Tim Flotsky (Sal Viscuso), who ended up leaving the priesthood, with the two eventually marrying and having a child who is possessed by the Devil; Chester being imprisoned for Peter's murder, escaping with his prison mate Dutch, and being afflicted with amnesia after a failed operation; Jessica's other daughter, Eunice, sleeping with a married congressman (Edward Winter), and then falling in love with Dutch; Mary's stepson Chuck (Jay Johnson), a ventriloquist whose hostilities are expressed through his alter ego, a quick-witted dummy named Bob; Jessica's love affairs with several men, including Donahue (John Byner) a private investigator hired to find the missing presumed-dead Chester, her psychiatrist, and a Latin American revolutionary known as El Puerco ('The Pig'; his friends just call him "El") (Gregory Sierra); Billy Tate's confinement by a cult called the "Sunnies" (a parody of Sun Myung Moon's Unification Church, called the "Moonies" by its critics), and then his affair with his school teacher who becomes unhinged; Danny's loss of Elaine and his subsequent trysts with a black woman (Polly, played by Lynne Moody), a prostitute (Gwen, played by Jesse Welles), and Chester's second wife (Annie, played by Nancy Dolman); and Burt's confinement to a mental institution, his abduction by aliens while being replaced with an oversexed alien lookalike on Earth, and getting blackmailed by the Mafia after becoming sheriff of their small town.

At the beginning of each episode, off-camera announcer Rod Roddy gives a brief summary of the convoluted storyline and remarks, "Confused? You won't be, after this week's episode of ... Soap." At the end of each episode, he asks a series of life-or-death questions in a deliberately deadpan style—"Will Jessica discover Chester's affair? Will Benson discover Chester's affair? Will Benson care?" and concludes each episode with the trademark line, "These questions—and many others—will be answered in the next episode of ... Soap."

The fourth season ended with Jessica being shot by a South American firing squad, it being unclear whether she survived. This was the result of the unexpected cancellation of the fifth season, which prevented the producers from coming up with a logical end.

== Cast and characters ==
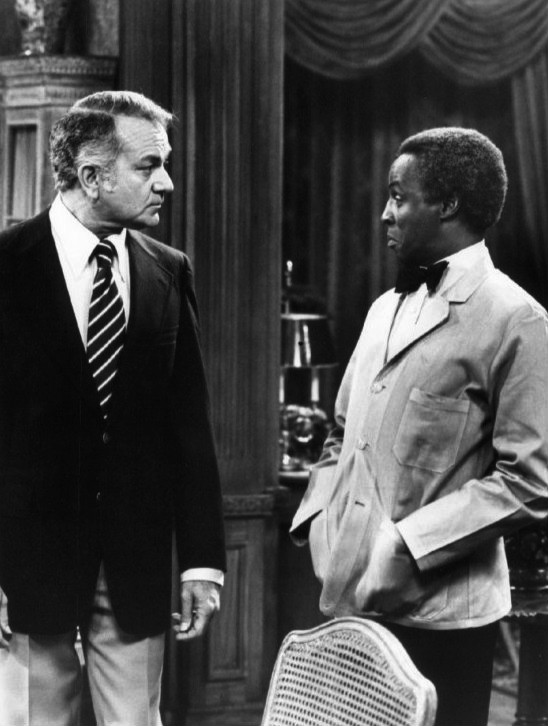
Chester and Benson.

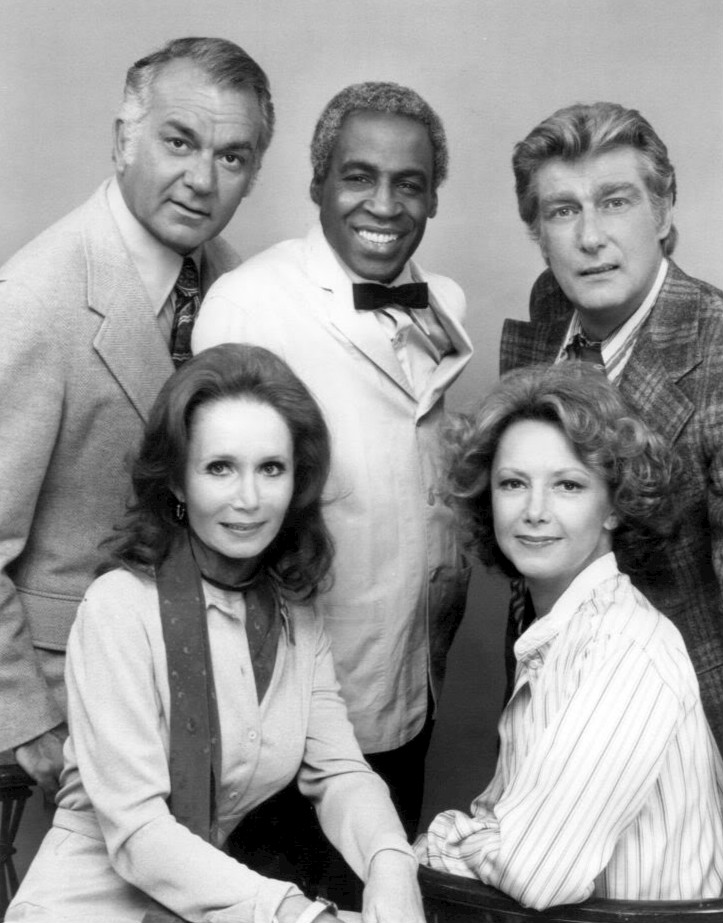
The Tates and Campbells with Benson.

=== Main ===
- Katherine Helmond as Jessica Tate, the matriarch of the Tate family
- Robert Mandan as Chester Tate, Jessica's philandering (later ex-) husband
- Diana Canova as Corinne Tate Flotsky, Chester and Jessica's adoptive second child
- Jennifer Salt as Eunice Tate Leitner, Chester and Jessica's eldest child
- Jimmy Baio as Billy Tate, Chester and Jessica's youngest child
- Cathryn Damon as Mary Campbell, the matriarch of the Campbell family
- Richard Mulligan as Burt Campbell, Mary's neurotic second husband
- Ted Wass as Danny Dallas, Mary's elder son
- Billy Crystal as Jodie Dallas, Mary's younger son
- Jay Johnson as Chuck and Bob Campbell, Burt's son and his psychopathic dummy
- Arthur Peterson Jr. as "The Major", Jessica and Mary's senile father
- Robert Guillaume as Benson, the Tate family's cook/butler (seasons 1–3)
- Donnelly Rhodes as Dutch Leitner, Chester's former cellmate and Eunice's eventual husband (seasons 2–4)
- Roscoe Lee Brown as Saunders, Benson's replacement (seasons 3–4)
- Rod Roddy as the announcer (initially Casey Kasem, who quit after the pilot episode)

=== Notable recurring cast ===
- Eugene Roche as E. Ronald Mallu, Esq., (seasons 1–4), the Tate family's lawyer who falls in love with Jessica
- Rebecca Balding as Carol David, (seasons 1–4), Mallu's assistant who falls in love with Jodie and becomes pregnant with his child
- Robert Urich as Peter Campbell (season 1), Burt's elder son, a tennis coach who has simultaneous affairs with Jessica and Corinne
- Sal Viscuso as Father Timothy Flotsky (seasons 1–3), a Catholic priest who renounces the priesthood to marry Corinne
- Gordon Jump as Chief of Police Tinkler (seasons 1–2), the head of the Dunn's River police force
- Inga Swenson as Ingrid Svenson (seasons 1–2), Corinne's biological mother
- Dinah Manoff as Elaine Lefkowitz Dallas (seasons 1–2), Danny's first wife
- Doris Roberts as Flo Flotsky (seasons 1–2), Tim's domineering mother
- Caroline McWilliams as Sally (season 2), Burt's secretary
- John Byner as Detective George Donohue (seasons 2–3), a private detective hired to find Chester who begins a relationship with Jessica
- Randee Heller as Alice (seasons 2–3), Jodie's lesbian roommate
- Marla Pennington as Leslie Walker (seasons 3–4), Billy's unhinged high school English teacher and girlfriend
- Lynne Moody as Polly Dawson (seasons 3–4), Danny's widowed girlfriend
- Allan Miller as Dr. Alan Posner (seasons 3–4), Jessica's psychiatrist who later falls in love with her
- Nancy Dolman as Annie Selig Tate (season 4), Eunice's college friend and Chester's second wife
- Gregory Sierra as "El Puerco" Valdez (season 4), a South American communist revolutionary who kidnaps and then falls in love with Jessica
- Barbara Rhoades as Maggie Chandler (season 4), a private investigator hired by and later in a relationship with Jodie
- Joe Mantegna as Juan One (season 4), one of "El Puerco"'s men
- Candice Azzara as Millie (season 2), Mobster Mel's girlfriend, later Danny's girlfriend

=== Guest stars ===
Notable actors who appeared in guest roles include Sorrell Booke, Nita Talbot, Lee Bergere, Ted Shackelford, Robert Englund, Kurtwood Smith, Alan Oppenheimer and Bernard Fox.

== Episodes ==
Season	Episodes	Originally released	
Season	Episodes	First released	Last released
1	25	September 13, 1977	March 28, 1978
2	23	September 14, 1978	March 15, 1979
3	23	September 13, 1979	March 27, 1980
4	22	November 12, 1980	April 20, 1981

== Pre-production ==
=== Casting ===
Richard Mulligan was originally considered for the part of Chester Tate, but director Jay Sandrich felt Mulligan would be more appropriate as Burt Campbell. Sandrich suggested Robert Mandan (whom he had directed on the Mary Tyler Moore Show) for the role of Chester instead.

Recalling the challenge of casting the role of Benson, Sandrich recalled,

We couldn't find Benson. We had so much trouble with Benson. We were reading women, we were reading Orientals, we were reading—Asians, I'm sorry—we were reading Black women, we were reading Norwegians, anybody. We could not find that part... We were looking for Bob Guillaume, is what we were looking for. Somebody who had that demeanor and could deliver one-lines... I'd seen him as a performer... I didn't see him do comedy, but I remembered the name. I didn't know if he could do comedy, but he was such a dynamic personality. Just pay attention to him.

According to Sandrich, the actor cast to play Mary Campbell in the initial pilot was "a very good actress, but she was just as neurotic as Mulligan, so that didn't work." Concerned with selling the show to the network, Fred Silverman authorized re-shooting the pilot with Cathryn Damon.

=== Protests and controversy ===
In early March 1977, ABC screened the first two episodes of Soap for the executives of its 195 affiliate stations, many of whom were instantly appalled by the show's emphasis on sex and infidelity. ABC was privately told by two of the affiliates, neither in a major market, that the show was "raunchy" and its subject matter unfit for television.

In June 1977, a Newsweek preview of the fall season written by Harry F. Waters panned the show while characterizing some of its basic plot elements incorrectly and offering exaggerated reports of its sexual content. Despite having not seen the pilot, Waters called the show a "sex farce" and claimed (erroneously) that the show included a scene of a Catholic priest being seduced in a confessional. Waters also stated:

Soap promises to be the most controversial network series of the coming season, a show so saturated with sex that it could replace violence as the PTA's Video Enemy No. 1.

— Harry F. Waters

Within days of the Newsweek report, a number of local and national religious organizations began to quickly mobilize against Soap, despite the fact that they also had not seen the pilot. Among these were the National Council of Churches, the United Church of Christ, the United Methodist Church, the National Council of Catholic Bishops and the Christian Life Commission of the Southern Baptist Convention, the latter of which went so far as to divest itself of 2,500 shares of ABC stock "because the board does not approve of programming related to the abuse of human sexuality, violence and perversion".

The Roman Catholic Church, led by its Los Angeles Archdiocese, also condemned the show and asked all American families to boycott it, saying, "ABC should be told that American Catholics and all Americans are not going to sit by and watch the networks have open season on Catholicism and morality. [Soap] is probably one of the most effective arguments for government censorship of TV that has yet come along." In August, the Board of Rabbis of Southern California, representing the three branches of Judaism, joined the Catholic protest, saying that the show, yet to be aired, "reached a new low". Dr. Everett Parker of the United Church of Christ called Soap "a low-life, salacious program" and complained that the show would be airing when children would be able to watch it. (ABC had scheduled it on Tuesdays after Happy Days and Laverne & Shirley, two of the most popular family television shows being broadcast at the time.)

The religious bodies organized a letter-writing campaign designed to pressure the show's sponsors not to advertise on the network. Although some of the groups asked their members to watch the show first, and then inform ABC of their feelings about it, others began working hard to get ABC to cancel the show before it premiered. One ABC vice president was shocked to learn that his 11-year-old child was required by a parochial school teacher to write a letter of protest to ABC, asking it to take the show off the air. In the end, 32,000 people wrote letters to ABC, only 9 of which were in support of the show. In addition to the religious protest, Soap also faced substantial pre-broadcast criticism from the International Union of Gay Athletes and the National Gay Task Force, both of which were concerned about the way the gay character Jodie Dallas and his professional football player lover would be portrayed.

To allay the concern of advertisers, some of whom had begun to cancel sponsorship of the program, ABC reluctantly dropped the price for commercial time from $75,000 per spot to $40,000 per spot. When Soap premiered on September 13, 1977, 18 out of 195 ABC affiliates refused to air the program, and others chose to broadcast it after 11 p.m. By its second week on the air, 2 more affiliates dropped out, bringing the boycott to 20 stations. Boycotting affiliates included KDUB in Dubuque, Iowa; KMVT in Twin Falls, Idaho; KTVO in Kirksville, Missouri/Ottumwa, Iowa; KXON in Sioux Falls, South Dakota; WABG-TV in Greenwood, Mississippi; WBAK in Terre Haute, Indiana; WCCB in Charlotte, North Carolina; WJCL in Savannah, Georgia; WJZ in Baltimore; WKAB in Montgomery, Alabama; WOWK-TV in Huntington, West Virginia; WRAL-TV in Raleigh, North Carolina; and WYUR in Huntsville, Alabama.

In 1978, when WCCB gave up its ABC affiliation to former NBC affiliate WSOC-TV and became independent, the latter station aired the show starting with late-night summer repeats of the first season, then showed it in its regular prime time slot the following fall. Except for two individuals, the only angry calls came from people wondering what happened to Saturday Night Live, which could now be found on WRET (today's WCNC-TV).

=== The "Soap Memo" ===
Aside from the external protests, Soap was also subject to heavy internal revisions from ABC's Broadcast Standards and Practices department, which monitors the content of programs. Writer-creator Susan Harris had developed a story arc for Soap in the form of a "show bible" which traced all the major characters, stories and events for five seasons. The Standards and Practices executives (commonly referred to as "censors") reviewed this extensive bible as well as the script for the two-part pilot and issued a long memo to Harris voicing their concerns about various storylines and characters. In addition to the sexual material that was widely reported in the press, the censors also took issue with the show's religious, political and ethnic content.

The "Soap Memo" was leaked to the press before the show premiered and was printed in its entirety in the Los Angeles Times on June 27, 1977. Among the notes were:

- "Please delete [the lines] '... the slut', 'that Polish slut', 'get your clothes off', 'it doesn't grow back', 'transsexual', 'Oh my God', 'did it hurt?'"
- "Substitute [the words] fruit, slut, tinker bell."
- "The CIA or any other government organization is not to be involved in General Nu's smuggling operation." (This character and storyline, which dealt with a Vietnamese opium smuggler who becomes involved in the Tate family through Jessica's long-lost son, was eventually removed from the show bible.)
- "In order to treat Jodie as a gay character, his portrayal must at all times be handled without 'limp-wristed' actions"
- "The colloquy between Peter and Jessica ... which relates to cunnilingus/fellatio is obviously unacceptable"
- "The relationship between Jodie and the football player should be handled in such a manner that explicit or intimate aspects of homosexuality are avoided entirely."
- "Father Flotsky's stand on liberalizing the Mass will have to be treated in a balanced, inoffensive manner. By way of example, the substitution of Oreos for the traditional wafer is unacceptable."

The "Soap Memo" also contained notes that were subsequently disregarded by the producers including:

- "Please change Burt Campbell's last name to avoid association with the Campbell Soup Co."
- "Corinne's affair with a Jesuit priest, her subsequent pregnancy as a result, and later exorcism, are all unacceptable."
- "Please direct Claire to dump the hot coffee in some part of Chester's anatomy other than his crotch." (Susan Harris later responded to this note: "so we didn't—we poured it in his lap.")

The "Soap Memo" was a rare public look into the behind-the-scenes process at a major network and copies of the document were often found posted on the bulletin boards of television production companies and on studio sets as a rallying point against censorship. In addition, the specific details in the memo further fueled the growing debate regarding the controversial content of Soap.

== Premiere and critical reception ==
Soap premiered on Tuesday, September 13, 1977, at 9:30 p.m. The episode was preceded by a disclaimer that the show "was part of a continuing character comedy" that included adult themes and that "viewer discretion" was advised. The disclaimer was both displayed on the screen and read by announcer Rod Roddy. It would remain throughout the first season before being dropped.

Much of Soap's controversy, among liberals and conservatives alike, ironically helped sell the series to the general public. Fueled by six months of pre-show protests (as well as a solid lead-in from the hit shows Happy Days, Laverne & Shirley, and Three's Company), the first episode swept its time slot with a 25.6 rating and a 39% share of the national audience. Although ABC received hundreds of phone calls after the premiere, executives at the network described initial public reaction as "mild" with more calls in favor of the show than in protest. A University of Richmond poll found that 74% of viewers found Soap inoffensive, 26% found it offensive, and half of those who were offended said they planned to watch it the next week.

Initial reviews—somewhat clouded by the controversy—were mixed, with negative reviews predictably focusing on the show's racy content. The Los Angeles Times called the show "a prolonged dirty joke" that "is without cleverness or style or subtlety. Its sex jokes are delivered by the shovelful, like manure." Variety called the show "forced and derivative", "bland" and "predictable and silly" while conceding that the sex is "no more outrageous than daytime soapers, no more outspoken than Three's Company." Time magazine praised the "talented cast" and singled out Jimmy Baio and Billy Crystal as "sharp young comedians", but felt the show suffered from "nastiness" and "lacked compassion".

On the more positive side, TV Guide gave the show a good review saying that there was "a heap of talent" in the cast and asking "Is it funny? Yes it is ... and I guess that constitutes redeeming social value".

Harry F. Waters' 1977 Newsweek review proved prescient of conservative reaction when the following year, the National PTA declared Soap one of "ten worst" shows in television. In spite of this designation, Soap ranked #13 for the 1977–78 season and went on to gain positive critical reviews and high ratings over the rest of its four-year run.

== Later seasons and cancellation ==
Although the uproar against Soap subsided shortly after its premiere, the program continued to generate additional criticism for its relatively frank depictions of homosexuals, racial and ethnic minorities and the mentally ill, as well as its treatment of other taboo topics such as social class, marital infidelity, impotence, incest, sexual harassment, rape, student–teacher sexual relationships, kidnapping, organized crime, murder of and by cast members, and new age cults. Much of the criticism focused on the openly gay character of Jodie Dallas (Billy Crystal). Soap was among the earliest American primetime series to include an openly gay character who was a major part of the series. Some social conservatives opposed the character on religious grounds, while some gay rights activists were also upset with the character of Jodie, arguing that certain story developments reinforced distorted stereotypes such as his desire to have a sex change operation, or represented a desire to change or downplay his sexual orientation.

Before the start of the second season, ABC ran a 90-minute retrospective clip show called "Who Killed Peter?" in which Burt Campbell visits Jessica Tate in prison as she awaits the verdict of her murder trial. The two discuss each of the show's individual characters and their possible motives for killing Burt's son Peter using flashbacks to illustrate specific story lines. The show was designed to remind viewers of what happened in Season 1 to prepare them for the upcoming season.

At the start of season three, another 90-minute retrospective aired in which Jessica says goodbye to Benson, using the flashback clips to try to explain why he should stay. This show also served to help launch the spinoff Benson, which was premiering at the start of the 1979–80 television season.

A third 90-minute retrospective titled "Jessica's Wonderful Life" aired at the start of Season 4. Jessica, who had just died in the hospital, found herself in heaven speaking to an angel (played by Bea Arthur). Jessica explained via the flashback clips why she was not ready to die and had to return to Earth to help her family.

Although Susan Harris had planned for five seasons of Soap, the program was abruptly canceled by ABC after its fourth season. Therefore, the final one-hour episode, which originally aired on April 20, 1981, did not serve as a series finale and instead ended with several unresolved cliffhangers. These involve a suicidal Chester preparing to kill Annie (his wife) and Danny (his biological son) after catching them in bed together, a hypnotized Jodie believing himself to be a 90-year-old Jewish man, Burt preparing to walk into an ambush orchestrated by his political enemies, Jessica about to be executed by a Communist firing squad, and Chester and El Puerco challenging each other to a duel. Vlasic Foods pulled its sponsorship of the program shortly after this episode aired and ABC announced that the program was not renewed for its planned fifth season. The official reason given by the network was its declining ratings. However, according to the Museum of Broadcast Communications, Soap "ended under suspicion that resistance from ad agencies may have caused ABC to cancel [it] at that point" because its still-controversial content was negatively affecting its relationship with sponsors.

A 1983 episode of Benson - "God, I Need This Job" - mentions Jessica's disappearance, noting that the Tate family is seeking to have her declared legally dead. In the episode, Jessica appears as an apparition who only Benson can see or hear and reveals to him that she is not dead, but in a coma somewhere in South America. No other incidents from the final episode of Soap are mentioned, and the opening bars of the theme song for Soap play as she leaves the room.

== Nielsen ratings and time slots ==
Season	No. of episodes	Season premiere	Season finale	Time slot	Rank	Rating	Households (in millions)
1	25	September 13, 1977	March 28, 1978	Tuesday at 9:30 p.m.	#13	22.0	16.0
2	23	September 14, 1978	March 15, 1979	Thursday at 9:30 p.m.	#19	21.3	15.9
3	23	September 13, 1979	March 27, 1980	Thursday at 9:30 p.m.	#25	20.5	15.6
4	22	November 12, 1980	April 20, 1981	Wednesday at 9:30 p.m. (Nov 1980-Jan 1981); Monday at 10 p.m. (Mar-Apr 1981)	#46	17.2	N/A

== Legacy ==
Since its cancellation, Soap's reputation has grown and it is often considered one of the best shows in television history. Much praise has been given to its "exceptionally rich cast" of performers "such as was seldom seen on any serious dramatic show".

In a 1982 analysis in The Village Voice, published as the series was entering syndication, TV critic Tom Carson lauded the ensemble, saying that "the cast matches the best TV series rep troupes ever." Carson went on to note that Soap "patently started out intended as a lampoon of middle-class values, and ended up instead as a weirdly offbeat celebration of them".

In 2007, Time, which initially panned the show, named it one of the "100 Best Shows of All-TIME". The Museum of Broadcast Communications said that Soap is "arguably one of the most creative efforts by network television before or after".

In 2010, The Huffington Post called Soap a "timeless comedy" and concluded: "Rarely does a show come along with such a unique voice and vision from the first episode".

British actress and comedian Catherine Tate, born Catherine Ford, changed her name after acquiring an Equity card, and chose her new surname based on Jessica Tate.

== Awards and nominations ==
Soap was nominated for a total 17 Emmy Awards including:

- Outstanding Comedy Series – nominated: 1978, 1980, 1981
- Outstanding Lead Actor in a Comedy Series (Richard Mulligan) – won: 1980, nominated: 1981
- Outstanding Lead Actress in a Comedy Series (Cathryn Damon) – won: 1980, nominated: 1978, 1981
- Outstanding Lead Actress in a Comedy Series (Katherine Helmond) – nominated: 1978, 1979, 1980, 1981
- Outstanding Supporting Actor in a Comedy Series (Robert Guillaume) – won: 1979
- Outstanding Directing in a Comedy Series (Jay Sandrich) – nominated: 1978, 1979
- Outstanding Art Direction in a Comedy Series – won: 1978
- Outstanding Achievement in Video Tape Editing in a Comedy Series – nominated: 1978

At the 1981 Golden Globe Awards, Katherine Helmond won Best Performance by an Actress in a TV Series – Musical/Comedy. That same year, the program was also nominated for Best TV Series – Musical/Comedy.

Director Jay Sandrich was nominated for Outstanding Directorial Achievement in Comedy Series at the DGA Awards in 1978 and 1979.

== Home media ==
Sony Pictures Home Entertainment has released all four seasons of Soap on identical DVDs in the US and Australia. Season 1 has been released on DVD in Region 2 in the UK, Spain and Scandinavia.

DVD name	No. of episodes	US/Australia: region 1/2/3/4 (NTSC)	UK, Spain, Scandinavia: region 2 (PAL)
The Complete First Season	25	September 16, 2003	February 25, 2009
The Complete Second Season	23	July 20, 2004	
The Complete Third Season	23	January 25, 2005	
The Complete Fourth Season	22	October 11, 2005	
The Complete Series	93	June 10, 2008	

Some of the episodes on these DVD collections are edited or replaced with the syndicated versions, shortened by as much as 2 to 3 minutes. Season 1 is also missing the disclaimer at the start of the show. In addition, the DVDs omit the three 90-minute Soap retrospective clips shows, which aired before each season began to remind the audience of what happened in the story during the previous season. The season 1 retrospective "Who Killed Peter Campbell?" and season 3 retrospective "Jessica's Wonderful Life" were released on VHS in the 1990s.

On August 27, 2013, it was announced that Mill Creek Entertainment had acquired the rights to various television series from the Sony Pictures library, including Soap. The company rereleased the first and second seasons on DVD on September 2, 2014, and Soap: The Complete Series on DVD in Region 1 on June 2, 2015. Most of the episodes on the Mill Creek sets are the original, uncut ABC versions, and the "On the last episode of Soap ..." synopses from the final season have been restored.

== See also ==
- List of Soap episodes
- Mary Hartman, Mary Hartman (1976)
- Benson (1979)
- The Life and Times of Eddie Roberts (1980)
- All That Glitters
