= Nancy Dolman =

Canadian actress and singer (1951–2010)

- Born: Nancy Jane Dolman; September 26, 1951; Toronto, Ontario, Canada
- Died: August 21, 2010 (aged 58); Los Angeles, California, U.S.
- Education: University of Western Ontario
- Occupations: Actress, singer
- Years active: 1970–1985
- Spouse: Martin Short (m. 1980)
- Children: 3
- Relatives: Jack Dolman (nephew)

Nancy Jane Dolman Short (September 26, 1951 – August 21, 2010) was a Canadian comedic actress and singer. She had a recurring role as Annie Selig Tate on the ABC sitcom Soap. She appeared in her husband Martin Short's 1985 cable television special Martin Short: Concert for the North Americas.

== Life and career ==
Dolman was born in Toronto. Her brother is director Bob Dolman. Dolman performed in the Canadian Rock Theatre production of Jesus Christ Superstar in the early 1970s, which travelled to Las Vegas and Los Angeles, and recorded an album with the group at MGM while they were in Los Angeles.

In 1980, she married fellow Canadian actor Martin Short, whom she had met during the run of the 1972 Toronto production of Godspell. Dolman was Gilda Radner's understudy. Dolman attended high school at York Mills Collegiate Institute in Toronto, and held a bachelor's degree in philosophy from the University of Western Ontario.

Dolman retired from show business in 1985 to be a homemaker and full-time mother to her children. A profile of the couple appeared in the February 1987 issue of Vogue. The family made their home in Pacific Palisades, California. Dolman and Short also kept a vacation home on Lake Rosseau, Ontario.

=== Children ===
Dolman and Short adopted three children as infants: Katherine Elizabeth (1983–2026), a social worker and graduate of New York University; Oliver Patrick (b. 1986), an employee of Warner Brothers and graduate of the University of Notre Dame's Mendoza College of Business; and Henry Hayter (b. 1989), who also graduated from the University of Notre Dame in May 2012.

== Death ==
Dolman suffered from ovarian cancer and died on August 21, 2010, in Los Angeles, California, at the age of 58. According to the Los Angeles County Coroner, she died of natural causes. Dolman's remains were cremated and her ashes were scattered from the dock of the Short family cottage, onto the waters of Lake Rosseau, Muskoka, Ontario, Canada.

=== Tributes ===
Steve Martin, a close friend of Dolman and Short, dedicated a musical elegy for Dolman following her death titled, "The Great Remember (For Nancy)" in his collaborative album, Rare Bird Alert with the Steep Canyon Rangers.
