= Lynne Moody =

American actress (born 1945)

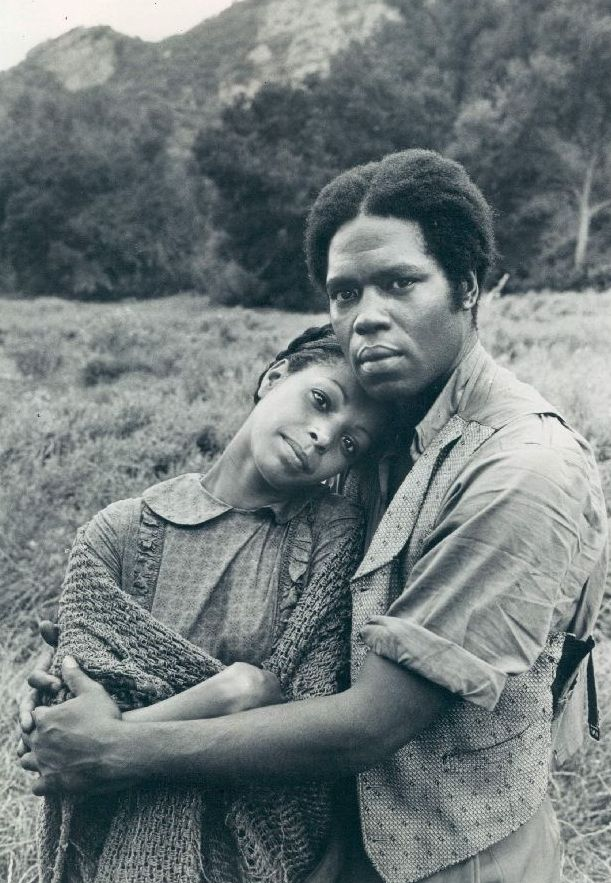
- Moody with Georg Stanford Brown in Roots (1977).
- Born: Emmalyn Paulette Moody; February 17, 1946 (age 80); Detroit, Michigan, U.S.
- Education: Evanston Township High School
- Occupation: Actress
- Years active: 1972–2020
- Known for: Tracy Curtis–Taylor – That's My Mama; Irene Harvey – Roots, Roots: The Next Generations; Patricia Williams – Knots Landing; Polly Dawson – Soap
- Children: 1

Emmalyn Paulette Moody (born February 17, 1946), (Note: Moody's year of birth is disputed. 1950 is claimed on majority of the sources. 1945 and 1946 are implied due to an article published by the Sedona Red Rock News about her reuniting with daughter, citing she had given birth in December 1964 at age 18 (or 19). A birth year of 1945 can also be implied due to her high school graduation occurring in 1963.) known professionally as Lynne Moody, is an American film and television actress. Beginning her career in the early 1970s, Moody is best known for her roles as Tracy Curtis–Taylor in the ABC television sitcom That's My Mama (1974–1975), Irene Harvey in Roots (1977), Roots: The Next Generations (1979), and Patricia Williams in Knots Landing (1988–1990).

== Biography ==
=== Early life and education ===
Born in Detroit, Michigan, Moody was raised in Evanston, Illinois, a north suburb of Chicago, Illinois. Her mother was a social worker and her father was a physician at a Chicago-area hospital. She attended Evanston Township High School, graduating in 1963, and worked as a stewardess before moving to Los Angeles to pursue an acting career.

=== Career ===
In 1970, Moody moved to Los Angeles where she was initially hired to work as a playboy bunny at a Playboy Club. While working at the Playboy Club, Moody studied acting at the Pasadena Playhouse. (Moody later studied at Goodman Theatre and Hull House.) In 1973, Moody landed her first role as Denny in the American blaxploitation horror film Scream Blacula Scream. Moody was the original Jenny Willis when the character was introduced in an episode of All in the Family titled "Lionel's Engagement" which was first broadcast the 9 February 1974. By the time the pilot episode of The Jeffersons aired in January 1975, the role was recast with Berlinda Tolbert replacing her as Jenny Willis.

In the fall of 1974, Moody landed the role of Tracy Curtis-Taylor in the ABC television series That's My Mama with Clifton Davis and Theresa Merritt. Moody portrayed the character throughout the series first season, later being replaced by Joan Pringle at the beginning of the second season. According to a 1975 JET article, Moody's manager Michael Kogg described Moody's exit from the show as "she didn't like the part anymore". After her exit from That's My Mama, Moody received a starring role in women in prison exploitation television film Nightmare in Badham County, later released to theaters as Nightmare in 1976.

In 1977, Moody portrayed Irene Harvey in Alex Haley's ABC television mini-series Roots. Moody later reprised her role in Roots: The Next Generations which aired in February 1979. From 1979 until 1980, Moody portrayed Polly Dawson in the ABC program Soap. Moody had other television roles such as, Patricia Williams in Knots Landing, and Nurse Julie Williams in E/R. In 2000, Moody had a recurring role on the hit ABC daytime drama series, General Hospital as Florence Campbell.

=== Other ventures ===
In the 1990s, Moody participated in public service radio spots for Africare to help improve the livelihood of Africans, along with fellow Roots cast members Georg Stanford Brown and Louis Gossett Jr.

=== Personal life ===
Moody has a daughter, Lisa Wright. Wright found Moody by doing a 23andMe DNA test and with the aid of Moody's brother. Prior to being reunited with her daughter, Moody spent years searching for her daughter, even enlisting the help of Alex Haley.

== Filmography ==
Year	Title	Role	Notes
1973	Scream Blacula Scream	Denny	
1973	The F.B.I.	Linda	Episode: "The Confession"
1974	All in the Family	Jenny Willis	Episode: "Lionel's Engagement"
1974–1975	That's My Mama	Tracy Curtis Taylor	22 episodes
1975	Las Vegas Lady	Carol	
1976	S.W.A.T.	Ellen Jeffers	Episode: "Any Second Now"
1976	Nightmare in Badham County	Diane Emery	Television film
1977	Roots	Irene Harvey	TV miniseries
1977	Quincy, M.E.	Laura Stokes	Episode: "A Blow to the Head... A Blow to the Heart"
1978	The Evil	Felicia Allen	
1979	Charleston	Minerva	Television film
1979	Roots: The Next Generations	Irene Harvey	TV miniseries
1979–1980	Soap	Polly Dawson	10 episodes
1980	Tenspeed and Brown Shoe	Lola Marshall	Episode: "The Sixteen Byte Data Chip and the Brown-eyed Fox"
1980	Willow B: Women in Prison	Lynn	Television film
1981	A Matter of Life and Death	Harley	Television film
1981	The Oklahoma City Dolls	Arvelle	Television film
1981	Goldie and the Boxer Go to Hollywood	Melanie Foster	Television film
1981	The White Shadow	Luann Mackey	Episode: "Burnout"
1981	Fly Away Home		Television film
1981	Strike Force	Annie / Jossy	Episode: "The Victims"
1981	Lou Grant	Sharon McNeil	Episode: "Rape"; Episode: "Risk"
1981	Trapper John, M.D.	Karen	Episode: "'Tis the Season"
1982	Some Kind of Hero	Lisa Keller	
1982	The Love Boat	Ellen Pozelle	Episode: "Pal-I-Mony-O-Mine"
1982	The Jeffersons	Maggie	Episode: "A Small Victory"
1982	White Dog	Molly	
1982	Magnum, P.I.	Bebe Kiamonni	Episode: "Black on White"
1982	T. J. Hooker	Susan McNeil	Episode: "The Protectors"
1982–1984	Hill Street Blues	Marty Nichols	7 episodes
1983	Wait till Your Mother Gets Home!	Marion	Television film
1983	Benson	Jennifer	Episode: "Love in a Funny Phase"
1983	A Caribbean Mystery	Victoria Jackson	Television film
1983	Just Our Luck	Alana	Episode: "Wedding Bell Shablues"
1984	The Toughest Man in the World	Leslie	Television film
1984	T. J. Hooker	Dr. Pamela Carter	Episode: "Death on the Line"
1984–1985	E/R	Nurse Julie Williams	22 episodes
1985	The Atlanta Child Murders	Selena Cobb	TV miniseries
1985	T. J. Hooker	Nadine	Episode: "The Chicago Connection"
1985	Lost in London	Janet Williams	Television film
1986	The Redd Foxx Show	Rachel Adams	Episode: "Pilot"
1986	A Fight for Jenny	Alice Martin	Television film
1986	Foofur	(voice)	3 episodes
1986	Amen	Jill Crawford	Episode: "Reuben's Romance"
1987	Houston Knights	Janice Halstead	Episode: "Scarecrow"
1987	Outlaws		Episode: "Orleans"
1987	Murder, She Wrote	Pam Collins	Episode: "Death Takes a Dive"
1987	21 Jump Street	Rhonda Patterson	Episode: "Two for the Road"
1988	A Pup Named Scooby-Doo	(voice)	TV series
1988–1990	Knots Landing	Patricia Williams	46 episodes
1990	MacGyver	Dr. Marion Skinner	Episode: "Lesson in Evil"
1991	Amen	Amy Cassidy	Episode: "Three's a Crowd"
1992	Civil Wars		Episode: "His Honor's Offer"
1993	Last Light	Hope Whitmore	Television film
1994	Ray Alexander: A Taste for Justice	Elizabeth Butler	Television film
1994	Chicago Hope	Yvette White	Episode: "Over the Rainbow"
1995	Chicago Hope	Yvette White	Episode: "Every Day a Little Death"
1995	Ray Alexander: A Menu for Murder	Elizabeth Butler	Television film
1995	Escape to Witch Mountain	Lindsay Brown	Television film
1996	Walker, Texas Ranger	Shelly Preston	Episode: "Patriot"
1997	Trials of Life	Penny	Television film
1997	The Ditchdigger's Daughters	Kathryn	Television film
1997	Beverly Hills, 90210	Vanessa Markley	Episode: "Aloha Beverly Hills
1997	Clueless	Tess Davenport	Episode: "The Intruder"
1997	Ellen Foster	Mrs. Douglas	Television film
1999	Chicago Hope	Dr. Rachel Kleema	Episode: "And Baby Makes 10"
2000	Arli$$	Vera Moore	Episode: "Comings and Goings"
2000	General Hospital	Florence Campbell	1 episode
2002	General Hospital	Florence Campbell	1 episode
2005	Alias	Rosemary	Episode: "The Index"
2005	The Reading Room	Helen	Television film
2007	Crossing Jordan	Helene Coleman	Episode: "Faith"
2009	Mrs. Washington Goes to Smith	Dr. Twineman	Television film
