= Marla Pennington =

American actress (born 1954)

Marla Pennington-Rowan
- Born: Marla Lynn Pennington; March 5, 1954 (age 72); Burbank, California, U.S.
- Occupation: Actress
- Years active: 1974–1989
- Spouse: Thomas Patrick Rowan (m. 1988; died 2021)
- Children: 2

Marla Lynn Pennington (born March 5, 1954) is an American former actress. She is best known for her role as Joan Anderson Lawson on Small Wonder, her last acting role to date.

Her other television credits include Soap, Diff'rent Strokes, Magnum, P.I., Charlie's Angels, Happy Days, The Incredible Hulk, and General Hospital. Pennington's film credits include National Lampoon's Class Reunion, and The Day of the Locust.

While Small Wonder was her last acting role, she appeared in a brief reunion with her co-stars on The Morning Show with Mike and Juliet on January 14, 2009. She provided commentary to the Small Wonder season 1 DVD set, released in February 2010.

In 1988, Pennington married entertainment lawyer Tom Rowan, son of comedian Dan Rowan (of Rowan and Martin fame) with whom she had a son, Dan, and a daughter, Kat. Upon Small Wonder ending in 1989, she retired from acting to devote time to her family. Rowan died in 2021, leaving Pennington a widow.

== Filmography ==
Film
Year	Film	Role	Notes
1976	Jim the World's Greatest	Jan	Alternative title: Story of a Teenager
1982	National Lampoon's Class Reunion	Mary Beth	Alternative title: Class Reunion
Television
Year	Title	Role	Notes
1974	Lucas Tanner	Jane Benson	1 episode
1976	Charlie's Angels	Jenny Warren	Episode: "Bullseye"
1976–1979	General Hospital	Samantha Livingston Chandler #2	Unknown episodes
1979	How the West Was Won	Blossom	Episode: "Luke"
1979	Buffalo Soldiers	Girl	Television movie
1979–1981	Soap	Leslie Walker	17 episodes
1980	The Incredible Hulk	Miriam Charles	Episode: "Deathmask"
1981	Magnum, P.I.	Carol Ann Little	Episode: "Billy Joe Bob"
1982	Happy Days	Cynthia Brannigan	Episodes: "A Touch of Classical" "Hi Yo, Fonzie Away"
1983	Herndon	Laura	Television movie
1984	Diff'rent Strokes	Nurse Joan Fleming	1 episode
1985–1989	Small Wonder	Joan Lawson	96 episodes
