= Cathryn Damon =

American actress (1930–1987)

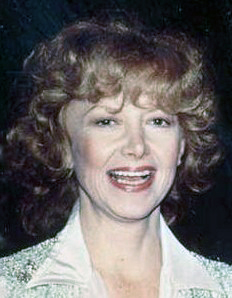
- Cathryn Damon in 1978
- Born: September 11, 1930; Seattle, Washington, U.S.
- Died: May 4, 1987 (aged 56); Los Angeles, California, U.S.
- Occupation: Actress
- Years active: 1957–1987
- Spouse: Richard Price Towers (1953–unknown)

Cathryn Lee Damon (September 11, 1930 – May 4, 1987) was an American actress known for her roles in sitcoms in the 1970s and 1980s. She was best known as Mary Campbell in Soap, for which she was nominated three times for the Primetime Emmy Award for Outstanding Lead Actress in a Comedy Series, winning in 1980.

== Early years ==
Damon was the elder daughter of Lee Frank Damon and Mary Cathryn Atwood. Her parents divorced and her mother married Walter A. Springer.

Damon was born in Seattle and raised in Tacoma and graduated from Stadium High School. As a child, she felt insecure, saying: "I never thought I was attractive enough. I never thought I was good enough." She also felt as a child she was responsible for her parents' divorce. She moved to New York City at age 16 to pursue ballet.

== Career ==
Damon began her career as a ballerina, dancing in the Jacob's Pillow Dance Festival in Lee, Massachusetts, and performing with the Metropolitan Opera's dance company.

Off-Broadway plays in which Damon appeared included The Boys From Syracuse. and The Secret Life of Walter Mitty. She appeared in several Broadway productions, including Shinbone Alley; Foxy; Flora the Red Menace; The Boys from Syracuse; The Last of the Red Hot Lovers; Sweet Bird of Youth; and The Cherry Orchard. During the 1967–68 season, she appeared in Dames at Sea at the Wayside Theatre and understudied the roles of both Mame Dennis and Vera Charles in Angela Lansbury's national tour of Mame.

Damon became familiar to television viewers as middle-class Mary Campbell on the primetime spoof of daytime soap operas aptly entitled Soap from 1977 to 1981. However, many fans may not know that she was the third and final actress cast in the role. Producer Tony Thomas said, "Cathryn Damon was brilliant. A lot of people don't know this, but we recast that to put her in it." She later appeared with Soap co-star Eugene Roche on Webster from 1984 to 1986. The pair played Cassie and Bill Parker, Webster's landlords, on the hit series. Other television credits included guest roles on The Love Boat, Fantasy Island, Murder, She Wrote, Matlock, and Mike Hammer.

Damon, along with costar and TV husband Richard Mulligan, won an Emmy Award for Soap in 1980 but could not appear in person to receive the award in person or give her speech, owing to an actors' strike. Mulligan referred to his late co-star (whom he affectionately called "Toots") and her strike-related absence when he received his second Best Actor Emmy more than a decade later for his role as Dr. Weston on the television series Empty Nest.

== Personal life ==
In August 1953, Damon married Richard Price Towers, an actor and singer, in New York City.

== Illness and death ==
In 1986, Damon was diagnosed with ovarian cancer, but continued acting in small roles up until shortly before her death a year later at age 56, on May 4, 1987. She died in Los Angeles at Cedars-Sinai Medical Center.

Her final role, as Elizabeth McGovern's mother in the movie She's Having a Baby with Kevin Bacon, was released posthumously. She is interred in Acacia Memorial Park near Seattle.

== Filmography ==
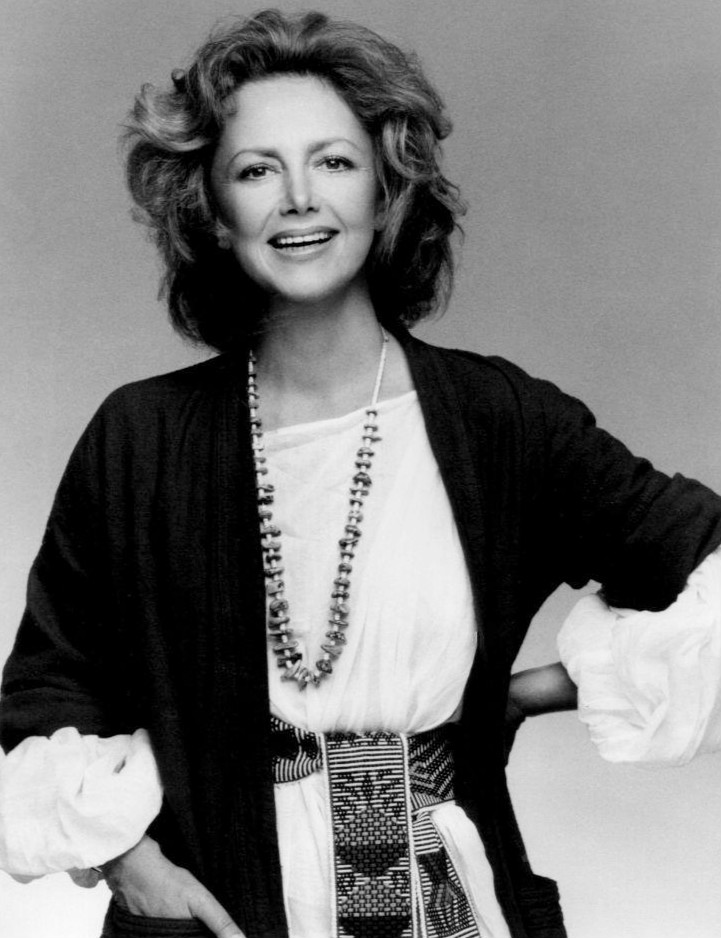
Damon in August 1977

=== Film ===
Year	Film	Role	Notes
1980	Getting There	Mary	Short
1980	How to Beat the High Cost of Living	Natalie	
1983	The First Time	Gloria	
1988	She's Having a Baby	Gayle Bainbridge	Filmed in 1986; final film role

=== Television ===
Year	Film	Role	Notes
1957	Producers' Showcase	Dancer	"Ruggles of Red Gap"
1963	Calamity Jane	Adelaide Adams	TV film
1977	Blansky's Beauties	Rose	"Nancy Breaks a Leg"
1977	Rafferty	Grace Hampton	"Death Out of a Blue Sky"
1977–1981	Soap	Mary Campbell	Main role
1978	The Love Boat	Charlotte	1 episode
1979	Friendships, Secrets and Lies	Martha	TV film
1981	Midnight Offerings	Diane Sotherland	TV film
1982	Not in Front of the Children	Sheila	TV film
1983	Fantasy Island	Baronne LaRue	"Midnight Waltz/Let Them Eat Cake"
1983	Who Will Love My Children?	Hazel Anderson	TV film
1983	The Love Boat	Joan	1 episode
1984	Simon & Simon	Kate Franklin	"Dear Lovesick"
1984	Murder, She Wrote	Morgana Cramer	"It's a Dog's Life"
1984–1988	Webster	Cassie Parker	Main role (season 2), guest (season 3)
1987	Matlock	Victoria Edwards	"The Chef"
1987	Mickey Spillane's Mike Hammer	Aunt Dorothy Putnam	"Who Killed Sister Lorna?"
