= Robert Mandan =

American actor (1932–2018)

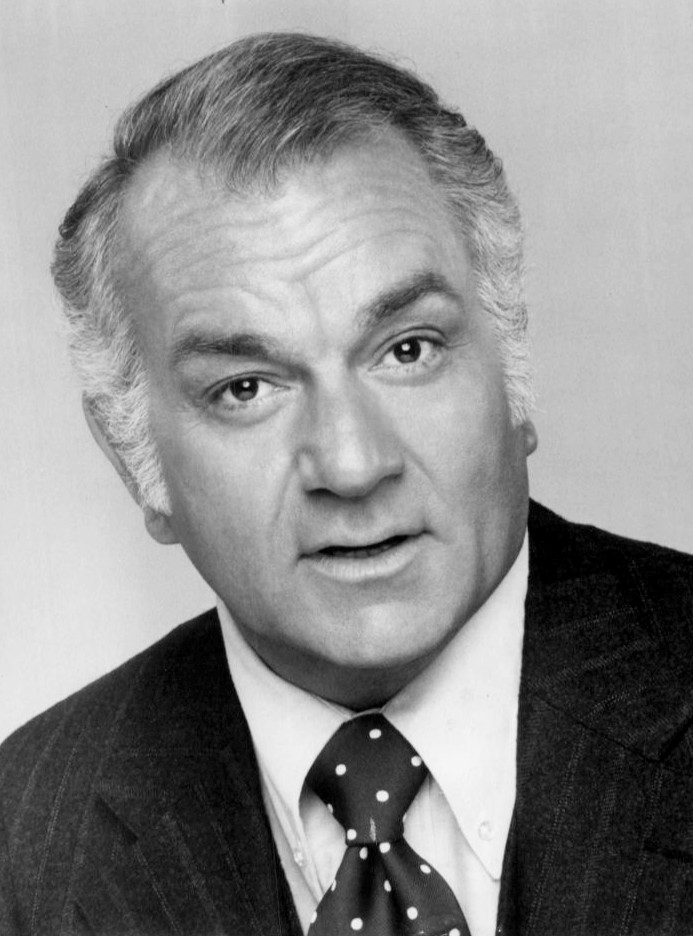
- Mandan in 1977
- Born: February 2, 1932; Clever, Missouri, U.S.
- Died: April 29, 2018 (aged 86); Los Angeles, California, U.S.
- Occupation: Actor
- Years active: 1958–2006
- Spouse: Sherry Dixon (m. 1963)

Robert Mandan (February 2, 1932 – April 29, 2018) was an American actor, best known for his roles as Sam Reynolds in soap opera Search for Tomorrow (1965–1970), Chester Tate in satirical sitcom Soap (1977–1981) and James Bradford in the short-lived Three's Company spin-off Three's A Crowd (1984–1985).

== Career ==
Mandan first acted in such television serials as NBC's From These Roots (1958–1961) and businessman Sam Reynolds on Search for Tomorrow (1965–1970). He also appeared on Broadway in the 1970 musical Applause.

His sitcom appearances prior to Soap include an auctioneer in the 1972 premiere episode of Sanford and Son, attorney Mr. Morrison in a 1973 episode of All in the Family, and Maude's gay friend Barry on a 1974 episode of Maude. In 1972, Mandan appeared in the first episode of the last season of Mission: Impossible as Tim Sharkey. He also appeared in the Barnaby Jones episodes titled "Counterfall", "Killer on Campus" and "Prisoner of Deceit" and guest-starred in an episode of the western series Sara in 1976. He played Woody Billingsley in "The Love Boat" S2 E16 sketch "Like Father, Like Son" which aired 1/26/1979.

He played Mr. Kirby in the 1979 NBC television adaptation of You Can't Take it With You and the ineffective but well-meaning Colonel Fielding on the 1981 TV adaptation of Private Benjamin. He also had roles in two movies in 1982, as school principal Walter J. Coolidge in Zapped! and Senator Charles Wingwood in The Best Little Whorehouse in Texas. In 1982 he also played Henry's older brother Bill Rush in Too Close for Comfort.

In 1984–85, he played James Bradford on ABC's Three's a Crowd opposite John Ritter, and in 1986 he was Peace Corps member Dr. Bruce Gaines, who married Mrs. Garrett (played by Charlotte Rae) in her final episodes on The Facts of Life. He appeared as Steven in the 1990 episode of The Golden Girls entitled "Great Expectations". In 1991, he reunited with Katherine Helmond for two episodes of her next series, Who's the Boss?.

In 1993, he played the Cardassian diplomat Kotan Pa'Dar in the Star Trek: Deep Space Nine episode "Cardassians", who learned of the survival of a son he had believed lost in a terrorist attack. Mandan also had a role on Married... with Children in the episode "The D'Arcy Files" (1994), playing the shady Walter Traugott. His return to serials included the roles of Maxwell Hammer, a friend of Minx, on Santa Barbara (1990), Mr. Jonesy (alongside Louise Sorel) on Days of Our Lives from 1997 to 1998, and guest-starring as a judge on General Hospital in early 2006.

He appeared onstage throughout his career. Aside from Applause, he starred in the pre-Broadway version of the 1990s revival of How to Succeed in Business Without Really Trying as J.B. Biggley, he played Andrew Wyke in several touring company productions of the Anthony Shaffer mystery, Sleuth, and he was in the 2002 production of A Twilight Romance at the Falcon Theatre in Burbank, California.

Mandan was a frequent special guest on The $25,000 Pyramid during the 1980s. He also appeared on many other game shows, including Match Game, Family Feud, Super Password, Chain Reaction, and Hollywood Squares.

== Death ==
Mandan died in Los Angeles on April 29, 2018, following a long battle with cancer. He was survived by his wife, Sherry Dixon, a licensed primal psychotherapist; the couple wed in 1963. Upon his death, he was cremated.

== Filmography ==
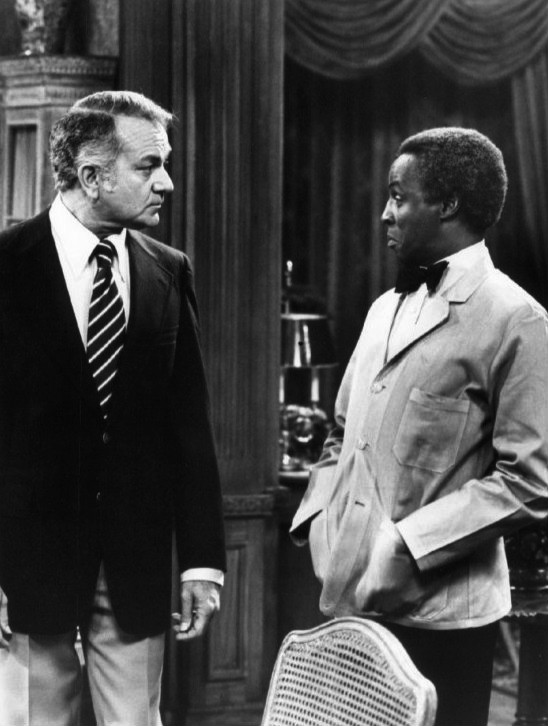
Mandan as Chester Tate and Robert Guillaume as Benson in Soap, 1977

1972	The Carey Treatment	Dr. Barr	
1972	Hickey & Boggs	Mr. Brill	
1972	A Great American Tragedy	Leslie Baker	ABC Movie of the Week
1972	The Heist	Owens	ABC Movie of the Week
1973	The Norliss Tapes	George Rosen	Television film
1974	Panic on the 5:22	Dr. Cruikshank	ABC Movie of the Week
1975	One Day At a Time	Pete Holston	
1977	MacArthur	Representative Martin	
1981	Return of the Rebels	Big Al Williams	
1982	The Best Little Whorehouse in Texas	Senator Wingwood	
1982	Zapped!	Walter J. Coolidge	
1986	The Facts Of Life	Bruce Gaines	
1992	The Nutt House	Mr. Henderson	
1993	Star Trek: Deep Space Nine	Kotan Pa'Dar	Episode: Cardassians
1997	The Matchmaker	McGlory Senior	
2002	Teddy Bears' Picnic	Stanton Vandermint	
