= Diana Canova =

American actress

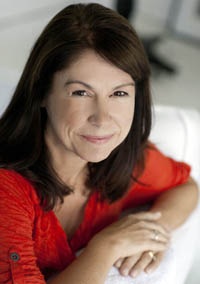
- Canova in 2010
- Born: Palm Beach, Florida, U.S.
- Education: Hollywood High School; Los Angeles City College
- Occupations: Actress; singer; adjunct professor
- Years active: 1974–present
- Known for: Soap; Throb
- Spouses: Geoff Levin (m. 1976–1979); Elliot Scheiner (m. 1985)
- Children: 2
- Mother: Judy Canova

Diana Canova is an American actress, director, and professor. She is best known for her role as Corinne Tate on Soap (1977-1980).

== Early life ==
Canova was born in Palm Beach, Florida, to actress and singer Judy Canova and a Cuban musician. She was raised in the Greater Los Angeles Area, where she graduated from Hollywood High School. Canova later studied acting at Los Angeles City College.

== Career ==
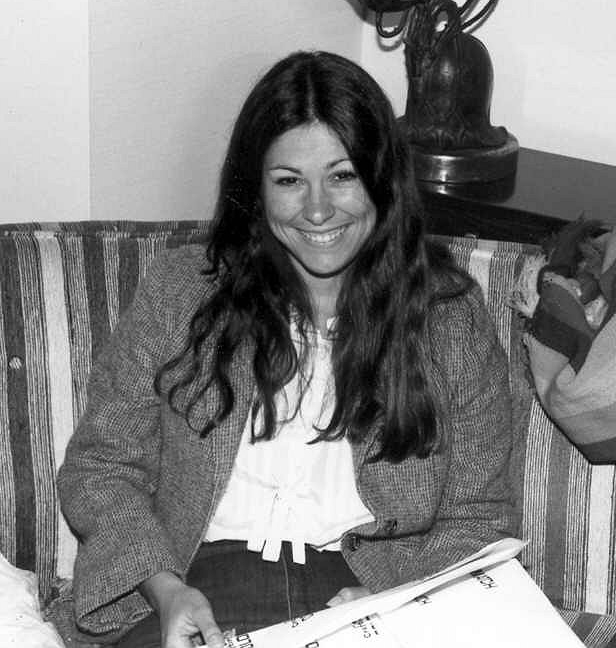
Canova in 1979

Canova made her television acting debut in a 1974 episode of Happy Days portraying a considerably taller date of Richie; in reality both she and Ron Howard are the same height at 5'9". She later guest-starred on episodes of Chico and the Man and Starsky & Hutch and appeared in television films. In 1975, Canova co-starred in the cult movie The First Nudie Musical along with Cindy Williams. In 1976, she was a regular on Dinah and Her New Best Friends, a CBS summer replacement series for The Carol Burnett Show. Canova then landed the role of Corinne Tate on Soap in 1977 opposite Katherine Helmond as her mother. She remained with the series until 1980. Canova was known for her singing, exhibited during Perry Como's "Early American Christmas" program in 1978. The show was filmed in Williamsburg, Virginia, featured John Wayne, and had musical numbers interwoven with storytelling. In 1979, she made an appearance on Barney Miller as nude dancer/graduate student Stephanie Wolf.

In 1980, ABC executives offered Canova her own television series starring alongside Danny Thomas in I'm a Big Girl Now. The show lasted just one season. She then co-starred on the short-lived CBS sitcom Foot in the Door in 1983. A few years later, she was cast as Sandy Beatty on Throb, a sitcom that was broadcast in syndication from 1986 to 1988. Between 1984 and 1996, she appeared in three episodes of the long-running TV show Murder, She Wrote, including being featured as Maggie McCauley in 1990's "Murder: According to Maggie." In 1993, Canova co-starred in the ABC sitcom Home Free, which also featured Marian Mercer, her co-star from Foot in the Door. Since the mid-1990s, she has mainly done voice work for cartoons in video shorts. In 1995, she played "Jenny" in a revival of Stephen Sondheim's musical Company.

From 2015 to 2023, Canova was an adjunct professor of voice at Manhattanville College in Purchase, New York, and teaches private lessons. She has been working with the school systems of Easton and Redding, Connecticut, where she directs musicals and short plays as well as a high school improv troupe that performs at local charity events. Under her leadership, Joel Barlow High School's theater program has won several awards from the Connecticut Drama Association and has set the record for winning first place two years in a row in multiple categories.

== Personal life ==
Canova is married to record producer Elliot Scheiner. The couple has two children. She was married to Geoff Levin from 1976 until their divorce in 1979. Before marrying Scheiner, she and Steve Landesberg dated.

=== Religion ===
Canova is a former member of the Church of Scientology, an organization she has since criticized. She found the Scientologists straightforward in their desire for money, declaring in 1993 in a Premiere magazine interview, "The first time I walked in those doors, they said, 'Just give us all the money in your bank account.'" She also criticized the Church's counseling practice, called auditing, when she said, "They're telling you, 'Don't spend $100 an hour on a shrink's couch, it'll ruin your mind.' Auditing is so much better?"
