= 30th Primetime Emmy Awards =

1978 American television programming awards

- Date: September 17, 1978 (Ceremony); September 9, 1978 (Creative Arts Awards)
- Location: Pasadena Civic Auditorium, Pasadena, California
- Presented by: Academy of Television Arts and Sciences
- Hosted by: Alan Alda

Highlights
- Most awards: All in the Family; Holocaust (6)
- Most nominations: Holocaust (11)
- Outstanding Comedy Series: All in the Family
- Outstanding Drama Series: The Rockford Files
- Outstanding Limited Series: Holocaust
- Outstanding Comedy-Variety or Music Series: The Muppet Show

Television/radio coverage
- Network: CBS

The 30th Primetime Emmy Awards were held on September 17, 1978. The ceremony was broadcast on CBS, from the Pasadena Civic Auditorium, Pasadena, California. 37 awards were presented.

The top shows of the night were All in the Family, which won its then record fourth Emmy for Outstanding Comedy Series, and The Rockford Files. CBS continued its streak of dominance by winning its eighth straight Emmy for Outstanding Comedy Series, this record still stands. Actor Will Geer received three posthumous acting nominations for three different performances, but lost in each category.

For the first time in Emmy history, two shows won six major awards, All in the Family became the first show to win six major awards twice, and the miniseries Holocaust tied the record for most wins by a miniseries set the previous year by Roots.

This ceremony was interrupted for thirty minutes by a nationally televised address by then-President Jimmy Carter, joined by then-Israeli prime minister Menachem Begin and then-Egyptian president Anwar Sadat, in which Carter announced the signing of the Camp David Accords.

Rita Moreno's win made her the third person to become an EGOT.

== Winners and nominees ==
=== Programs ===
Programs
Outstanding Comedy Series: All in the Family (CBS); Barney Miller (ABC); M*A*S*H (CBS); Soap (ABC); Three's Company (ABC)	Outstanding Drama Series: The Rockford Files (NBC); Columbo (NBC); Family (ABC); Lou Grant (CBS); Quincy, M.E. (NBC)
Outstanding Comedy-Variety or Music Series: The Muppet Show (Syndicated); America 2-Night (Syndicated); The Carol Burnett Show (CBS); Evening at Pops (PBS); Saturday Night Live (NBC)	Outstanding Special - Comedy-Variety or Music: Bette Midler: Ol' Red Hair Is Back (NBC); The George Burns One-Man Show (CBS); Neil Diamond: I'm Glad You're Here with Me Tonight (NBC); The Second Barry Manilow Special (ABC); World of Magic (NBC)
Outstanding Special - Drama or Comedy: The Gathering (ABC); A Death in Canaan (CBS); Jesus of Nazareth (NBC); Our Town (NBC); Young Joe, the Forgotten Kennedy (ABC)	Outstanding Limited Series: Holocaust (NBC); Anna Karenina (PBS); I, Claudius (PBS); King (NBC); Washington: Behind Closed Doors (ABC)

=== Acting ===
==== Lead performances ====
Acting
Outstanding Lead Actor in a Comedy Series: Carroll O'Connor as Archie Bunker in All in the Family (CBS); Alan Alda as Hawkeye Pierce in M*A*S*H (CBS); Hal Linden as Capt. Barney Miller in Barney Miller (ABC); John Ritter as Jack Tripper in Three's Company (ABC); Henry Winkler as Arthur "Fonzie" Fonzarelli in Happy Days (ABC)	Outstanding Lead Actress in a Comedy Series: Jean Stapleton as Edith Bunker in All in the Family (CBS) (Episode: "Edith's 50th Birthday"); Bea Arthur as Maude Findlay in Maude (CBS); Cathryn Damon as Mary Campbell in Soap (ABC); Valerie Harper as Rhoda Morgenstern in Rhoda (CBS); Katherine Helmond as Jessica Tate in Soap (ABC); Suzanne Pleshette as Emily Hartley in The Bob Newhart Show (CBS)
Outstanding Lead Actor in a Drama Series: Edward Asner as Lou Grant in Lou Grant (CBS) (Episode: "Physical"); James Broderick as Doug Lawrence in Family (ABC); Peter Falk as Lt. Columbo in Columbo (NBC); James Garner as Jim Rockford in The Rockford Files (NBC); Jack Klugman as Dr. Quincy in Quincy, M.E. (NBC); Ralph Waite as John Walton Sr. in The Waltons (CBS)	Outstanding Lead Actress in a Drama Series: Sada Thompson as Kate Lawrence in Family (ABC); Melissa Sue Anderson as Mary Ingalls in Little House on the Prairie (NBC); Fionnula Flanagan as Molly Culhane in How the West Was Won (ABC); Kate Jackson as Sabrina Duncan in Charlie's Angels (ABC); Michael Learned as Olivia Walton in The Waltons (CBS); Susan Sullivan as Dr. Julie Farr in Julie Farr, M.D. (ABC)
Outstanding Lead Actor in a Drama or Comedy Special: Fred Astaire as Ted Long in A Family Upside Down (NBC); Alan Alda as Caryl W. Chessman in Kill Me If You Can (NBC); Hal Holbrook as the Stage Manager in Our Town (NBC); Martin Sheen as Taxi Driver in Taxi!!! (NBC); James Stacy as Kenny Briggs in Just a Little Inconvenience (NBC)	Outstanding Lead Actress in a Drama or Comedy Special: Joanne Woodward as Betty Quinn in See How She Runs (CBS); Helen Hayes as Emma Long in A Family Upside Down (NBC); Eva Marie Saint as Passenger in Taxi!!! (NBC); Maureen Stapleton as Kate in The Gathering (ABC); Sada Thompson as Mrs. Gibbs in Our Town (NBC)
Outstanding Lead Actor in a Limited Series: Michael Moriarty as Erik Dorff in Holocaust (NBC); Hal Holbrook as Portius Wheeler in The Awakening Land (NBC); Jason Robards as President Richard Monckton in Washington: Behind Closed Doors (ABC); Fritz Weaver as Dr. Josef Weiss in Holocaust (NBC); Paul Winfield as Dr. Martin Luther King Jr. in King (NBC)	Outstanding Lead Actress in a Limited Series: Meryl Streep as Inga Helms-Weiss in Holocaust (NBC); Rosemary Harris as Berta Palitz Weiss in Holocaust (NBC); Elizabeth Montgomery as Sayward Luckett Wheeler in The Awakening Land (NBC); Lee Remick as Erica Trenton in Wheels (NBC); Cicely Tyson as Coretta Scott King in King (NBC)

==== Supporting performances ====
Outstanding Continuing Performance by a Supporting Actor in a Comedy Series: Rob Reiner as Michael Stivic in All in the Family (CBS); Tom Bosley as Howard Cunningham in Happy Days (ABC); Gary Burghoff as Radar O'Reilly in M*A*S*H (CBS); Harry Morgan as Sherman T. Potter in M*A*S*H (CBS); Vic Tayback as Mel Sharples in Alice (CBS)	Outstanding Continuing Performance by a Supporting Actress in a Comedy Series: Julie Kavner as Brenda Morgenstern in Rhoda (CBS) (Episode: "Brenda the Bank Girl"); Polly Holliday as Florence Jean Castleberry in Alice (CBS); Sally Struthers as Gloria Bunker-Stivic in All in the Family (CBS); Loretta Swit as Margaret Houlihan in M*A*S*H (CBS); Nancy Walker as Ida Morgenstern in Rhoda (CBS)
Outstanding Continuing Performance by a Supporting Actor in a Drama Series: Robert Vaughn as Frank Flaherty in Washington: Behind Closed Doors (ABC); Ossie Davis as Rev. Martin Luther King Sr. in King (NBC); Will Geer as Zebulon Walton in The Waltons (CBS); Sam Wanamaker as Moses Weiss in Holocaust (NBC); David Warner as Heydrich in Holocaust (NBC)	Outstanding Continuing Performance by a Supporting Actress in a Drama Series: Nancy Marchand as Margaret Pynchon in Lou Grant (CBS) (Episode: "Takeover"); Meredith Baxter as Nancy Lawrence Maitland in Family (ABC); Tovah Feldshuh as Helena Slomova in Holocaust (NBC); Linda Kelsey as Billie Newman in Lou Grant (CBS); Kristy McNichol as Letitia Lawrence in Family (ABC)
Outstanding Performance by a Supporting Actor in a Comedy or Drama Special: Howard Da Silva as Eddie in Verna: USO Girl (PBS); James Farentino as Simon Peter in Jesus of Nazareth (NBC); Burgess Meredith as Cardinal Burke in The Last Hurrah (NBC); Donald Pleasence as Captain Vladimir Popov in The Defection of Simas Kudirka (CBS); Efrem Zimbalist Jr. as Mike Long in A Family Upside Down (NBC)	Outstanding Performance by a Supporting Actress in a Comedy or Drama Special: Eva Le Gallienne as Fanny Cavendish in The Royal Family (PBS); Tyne Daly as Karen Renshaw in Intimate Strangers (ABC); Patty Duke as Wendy in A Family Upside Down (NBC); Mariette Hartley as Clare Gardiner in The Last Hurrah (NBC); Cloris Leachman as Clara Oddbody in It Happened One Christmas (ABC); Viveca Lindfors as Dr. Rosen in A Question of Guilt (CBS)
Outstanding Continuing or Single Performance by a Supporting Actor in Variety or Music: Tim Conway in The Carol Burnett Show (CBS); Dan Aykroyd in Saturday Night Live (NBC); John Belushi in Saturday Night Live (NBC); Louis Gossett Jr. in The Sentry Collection Presents Ben Vereen: His Roots (ABC); Peter Sellers in The Muppet Show (Syndicated)	Outstanding Continuing or Single Performance by a Supporting Actress in Variety or Music: Gilda Radner in Saturday Night Live (NBC); Bea Arthur in Laugh-In (NBC); Jane Curtin in Saturday Night Live (NBC); Dolly Parton in Cher... Special (ABC); Bernadette Peters in The Muppet Show (Syndicated)

==== Single performances ====
Outstanding Lead Actor for a Single Appearance in a Drama or Comedy Series: Barnard Hughes as Judge Felix Rushman in Lou Grant (CBS): "Judge"; David Cassidy as Officer Dan Shay in Police Story (NBC): "A Chance to Live"; Will Geer as Franklyn Bootherstone in The Love Boat (ABC): "The Old Man and the Runaway"; Judd Hirsch as Mike Andretti in Rhoda (CBS): "Rhoda Likes Mike"; John Rubinstein as Jeff Maitland in Family (ABC): "And Baby Makes Three"; Keenan Wynn as Ben Fletcher in Police Woman (NBC): "Good Old Uncle Ben"	Outstanding Lead Actress for a Single Appearance in a Drama or Comedy Series: Rita Moreno as Rita Capkovic in The Rockford Files (NBC): "The Paper Palace"; Patty Duke as Leslee Wexler in Having Babies III (ABC); Kate Jackson as Robin in James at 15/16 (NBC): "Pilot"; Jayne Meadows as Florence Nightingale in Meeting of Minds (PBS): "Luther, Voltaire, Plato, Nightingale"; Irene Tedrow as Miss Jordan on James at 15/16 (NBC): "Ducks"
Outstanding Single Performance by a Supporting Actor in a Comedy or Drama Series: Ricardo Montalbán as Satangkai in How the West Was Won (ABC): "Part II"; Will Geer as Santa Claus in Eight is Enough (ABC): "Yes, Nicholas... There is a Santa Claus"; Larry Gelman as Edward Sellers in Barney Miller (ABC): "Goodbye, Mr. Fish"; Harold Gould as Martin Morgenstern in Rhoda (CBS): "Happy Anniversary"; Abe Vigoda as Det. Phil Fish in Barney Miller (ABC): "Goodbye, Mr. Fish"	Outstanding Single Performance by a Supporting Actress in a Comedy or Drama Series: Blanche Baker as Anna Weiss in Holocaust (NBC): "Part I"; Ellen Corby as Esther Walton in The Waltons (CBS): "Grandma Comes Home"; Jeanette Nolan as Granny McWhirter in The Awakening Land (NBC): "Part I"; Beulah Quo as Empress Tz'u-hsi in Meeting of Minds (PBS): "Douglass, Tz'u-Hsi, Beccaria, De Sade"; Beatrice Straight as Alice Dain Leggett in The Dain Curse (CBS): "Part I"

=== Directing ===
Directing
Outstanding Directing in a Comedy Series: All in the Family (CBS): "Edith's 50th Birthday" – Paul Bogart; Happy Days (ABC): "Richie Almost Dies" – Jerry Paris; M*A*S*H (CBS): "Comrades in Arms" – Burt Metcalfe and Alan Alda; Maude (CBS): "Vivian's Decision" – Hal Cooper; Soap (ABC): "Episode #24" – Jay Sandrich	Outstanding Directing in a Drama Series: Holocaust (NBC) – Marvin J. Chomsky; The Dain Curse (CBS) – E.W. Swackhamer; I, Claudius (PBS) – Herbert Wise; King (NBC) – Abby Mann; Washington: Behind Closed Doors (ABC) – Gary Nelson
Outstanding Directing in a Comedy-Variety or Music Series: The Carol Burnett Show (CBS): "Steve Martin and Betty White" – Dave Powers; The Muppet Show (Syndicated): "Elton John" – Peter Harris; The Richard Pryor Show (NBC): "Paula Kelly" – John Moffitt; Saturday Night Live (NBC): "Steve Martin" – Dave Wilson; Shields and Yarnell (CBS): "John Aylesworth" – Steve Binder	Outstanding Directing in a Comedy-Variety or Music Special: The Sentry Collection Presents Ben Vereen: His Roots (ABC) – Dwight Hemion; Mitzi... Zings Into Spring (CBS) – Tony Charmoli; The Paul Simon Special (NBC) – Dave Wilson; The Second Barry Manilow Special (ABC) – George Schaefer; World of Magic (NBC) – Walter C. Miller
Outstanding Directing in a Special Program - Drama or Comedy: The Defection of Simas Kudirka (CBS) – David Lowell Rich; Breaking Up (ABC) – Delbert Mann; The Gathering (ABC) – Randal Kleiser; Our Town (NBC) – George Schaefer; Something for Joey (CBS) – Lou Antonio; Verna: USO Girl (PBS) – Ronald F. Maxwell

=== Writing ===
Writing
Outstanding Writing in a Comedy Series: All in the Family (CBS): "Cousin Liz" – Story by : Barry Harman and Harve Brosten Teleplay by : Bob Weiskopf and Bob Schiller; All in the Family (CBS): "Edith's Crisis of Faith, Part 2" – Story by : Erik Tarloff Teleplay by : Erik Tarloff, Mel Tolkin and Larry Rhine; All in the Family (CBS): "Edith's 50th Birthday" – Bob Weiskopf and Bob Schiller; M*A*S*H (CBS): "Fallen Idol" – Alan Alda	Outstanding Writing in a Drama Series: Holocaust (NBC) – Gerald Green; The Dain Curse (CBS) – Robert W. Lenski; King (NBC) – Abby Mann; Meeting of Minds (PBS) – Steve Allen; The Norman Conquests (PBS) – Alan Ayckbourn
Outstanding Writing in a Comedy-Variety or Music Special: The Paul Simon Special (NBC); Bette Midler: Ol' Red Hair Is Back (NBC); The George Burns One-Man Show (CBS); The Second Barry Manilow Special (ABC); The Sentry Collection Presents Ben Vereen: His Roots (ABC)	Outstanding Writing in a Comedy-Variety or Music Series: The Carol Burnett Show (CBS): "Steve Martin and Betty White"; America 2-Night (Syndicated): "Carol Burnett"; The Carol Burnett Show (CBS): "Ken Berry"; The Muppet Show (Syndicated): "Dom DeLuise"; Saturday Night Live (NBC): "Steve Martin"
Outstanding Writing in a Special Program - Drama or Comedy - Original Teleplay: The Last Tenant (ABC) – George Rubino; Breaking Up (ABC) – Loring Mandel; The Defection of Simas Kudirka (CBS) – Bruce Feldman; The Gathering (ABC) – James Poe; Something for Joey (CBS) – Jerry McNeely; The Storyteller (CBS) – Richard Levinson and William Link	Outstanding Writing in a Special Program - Drama or Comedy - Adaptation: Mary White (ABC) – Caryl Ledner; Actor (PBS) – Jerome Lawrence and Robert E. Lee; A Love Affair: The Eleanor and Lou Gehrig Story (NBC) – Blanche Hanalis; Verna: USO Girl (PBS) – Albert Innaurato; The War Between the Tates (NBC) – Barbara Turner

== Most major nominations ==
Networks with multiple major nominations (Note: "Major" constitutes the categories listed above: Program, Acting, Directing, and Writing. Does not include the technical categories.)
Network	Number of Nominations
NBC	61
ABC	59
CBS	53
PBS	13

Programs with multiple major nominations
Program	Category	Network	Number of Nominations
Holocaust	Limited	NBC	11
All in the Family	Comedy	CBS	9
M*A*S*H	Comedy	CBS	7
Saturday Night Live	Variety	NBC	7
Family	Drama	ABC	6
King	Limited	NBC	6
The Carol Burnett Show	Variety	CBS	5
Lou Grant	Drama	CBS	5
The Muppet Show	Variety	Syndicated	5
Rhoda	Comedy		5
Barney Miller	Comedy	ABC	4
A Family Upside Down	Special	NBC	4
The Gathering	Special	ABC	4
Our Town	Special	NBC	4
Soap	Comedy	ABC	4
The Waltons	Drama	CBS	4
Washington: Behind Closed Doors	Limited	ABC	4
The Awakening Land	Limited	NBC	3
The Dain Curse	Drama	CBS	3
The Defection of Simas Kudirka	Special	CBS	3
Happy Days	Comedy	ABC	3
Meeting of Minds	Drama	PBS	3
The Rockford Files	Drama	NBC	3
The Second Barry Manilow Special	Variety	ABC	3
The Sentry Collection Presents Ben Vereen: His Roots	Variety	ABC	3
Verna: USO Girl	Special	PBS	3
Alice	Comedy	CBS	2
American 2-Night	Variety	Syndicated	2
Bette Midler: Ol' Red Hair Is Back	Variety	NBC	2
Breaking Up	Special	ABC	2
Columbo	Drama	NBC	2
The George Burns One-Man Show	Variety	CBS	2
How the West Was Won	Drama	ABC	2
I, Claudius	Limited	PBS	2
James at 15/16	Drama	NBC	2
Jesus of Nazareth	Special	NBC	2
The Last Hurrah	Special	NBC	2
Maude	Comedy	CBS	2
Quincy, M.E.	Drama	NBC	2
The Paul Simon Special	Variety	NBC	2
Something for Joey	Special	CBS	2
Taxi!!!	NBC		2
Three's Company	Comedy	ABC	2
World of Magic	Variety	NBC	2

== Most major awards ==
Networks with multiple major awards
Network	Number of Awards
CBS	14
NBC	11
ABC	7
PBS	2

Programs with multiple major awards
Program	Category	Network	Number of Awards
All in the Family	Comedy	CBS	6
Holocaust	Limited	NBC	6
The Carol Burnett Show	Variety	CBS	3
Lou Grant	Drama	CBS	3
The Rockford Files	Drama	NBC	2
