= Jodie Dallas =

Fictional character from the US sitcom "Soap"

- Soap character
- Jodie Dallas as he appeared in the series premiere
- First appearance: Episode 1.1
- Last appearance: Episode 4.16
- Created by: Susan Harris
- Portrayed by: Billy Crystal

In-universe information
- Occupation: Television commercial director
- Family: Johnny Dallas (father, deceased); Mary Campbell (mother); Burt Campbell (step-father); Danny Dallas (half-brother); Scott Campbell (half-brother); Chuck Campbell (step-brother); Peter Campbell (step-brother)
- Significant others: Dennis Phillips; Carol David; Alice; Maggie Chandler
- Children: Wendy
- Relatives: The Major (grandfather); Randolph Gatling (uncle); Jessica Tate (aunt); Chester Tate (uncle by marriage); Corinne Tate Flotsky (cousin); Eunice Tate Leitner (cousin); Billy Tate (cousin); Timmy Flotsky (first cousin once removed)

Jodie Dallas is a fictional character from the 1977 American sitcom Soap. He was played by Billy Crystal. The son of central character Mary Campbell, Jodie works as a television commercial director. Jodie was among the first gay characters on American television. Despite being gay, Jodie fathered a child through a one-night stand, and many of his storylines throughout the series centered on his involvement with women. Jodie had relationships with two other women but maintained throughout the series that he was still gay. The series ended with Jodie, as the result of hypnotherapy, believing he was an elderly Jewish man.

Jodie Dallas was a source of controversy for the series. Religious organizations disapproved of his sexual orientation, while gay rights groups worried that his portrayal would be stereotypical.

== Fictional biography ==
Jodie Dallas is a young gay man living in his mother's home. He makes his living directing television commercials. He is in a romantic relationship with Dennis Phillips (Bob Seagren), a professional football player. Jodie enters the hospital to have sex reassignment surgery so that he and Dennis can legally marry. However, Dennis breaks up with him out of fear of exposure. Jodie attempts suicide by overdose but survives, although he remains depressed. He meets Carol David (Rebecca Balding), the assistant to the lawyer defending his Aunt Jessica on murder charges. Carol convinces him to go away with her for the weekend and, despite his being gay, they have a one-night stand. The two move in together and shortly thereafter Carol tells Jodie she is pregnant. Despite Dennis's pleas to take him back, Jodie decides to stay with the mother of his child. They plan to marry but Carol leaves Jodie at the altar.

Carol returns to tell Jodie that she does not want him to be a part of her baby's life. A depressed Jodie meets Alice (Randee Heller), an equally depressed lesbian, and they become roommates, eventually briefly trying to date. Carol's mother (Peggy Pope) shows up with his infant daughter, Wendy (Jenna Kay Starr). She offers him custody but only if he agrees to make Alice move out. Jodie chooses his daughter over his friend.

Carol returns again and sues Jodie for custody. Despite Carol and her mother's lying about him under oath, Jodie wins custody; Carol vows revenge. She kidnaps Wendy and Jodie hires private investigator Maggie Chandler (Barbara Rhoades) to find them. After tracking them across the country they rescue Wendy and Jodie proposes to Maggie. However, to be sure that his relationship with Maggie is real, Jodie decides to see a therapist. He emerges from a hypnotherapy session believing that he is a 90-year-old Jewish man named Julius Kassendorf.

== Controversy ==
Jodie Dallas was one of the first regular gay characters on American television. Sources frequently identify him as the first, but that distinction actually belongs to Peter Panama played by Vincent Schiavelli of the short-lived 1972 series The Corner Bar. Religious organizations were appalled by Soap before it aired based on reports of its contents, including its gay character and also its treatment of such subjects as adultery and impotence. Donald Wildmon of the National Federation for Decency mounted a letter-writing campaign, which in conjunction with similar campaigns mounted by more mainstream religious organization like the National Council of Churches, the United States Catholic Conference, the United Church of Christ, the Christian Life Conference of the Southern Baptist Convention and the United Methodist Church, generated an estimated 20,000 to 32,000 pieces of mail before the series ever aired.

"Oh, you wear that belted!" Jodie and his mother Mary, after she discovers him wearing her dress. Gay groups were concerned that Jodie would reflect negatively on gay people.

Gay groups were concerned about the character's portrayal as an apparent conflation of a gay man, a transvestite and a transsexual. They also criticized how Jodie's brother Danny continually denied Jodie's homosexuality, dismissing his declarations of it as jokes. Activists had mounted several large-scale demonstrations against individual episodes of the series Marcus Welby, M.D. ("The Other Martin Loring" in 1973 and "The Outrage" in 1974) and Police Woman ("Flowers of Evil", also in 1974). Newton Dieter of the Gay Media Task Force (GMTF), who had been consulting with the networks on LGBT characterizations for several years, reviewed the scripts for the first two episodes. He wrote to Tom Kersey, the head of ABC's Los Angeles Standards and Practices office, suggesting that the sex-change aspect of the character be dropped in favor of making Jodie a committed gay liberationist. Although not directly threatening action, Dieter advised Kersey that Welby/Police Woman-style demonstrations were possible should the character remain as portrayed in the first two episodes. In July 1977, representatives of GMTF, the National Gay Task Force and a hitherto unknown organization called the International Union of Gay Athletes (Note: The IUGA claimed to represent gay athletic associations around the world. It was later learned that the IUGA was a front consisting of four people and a non-existent leader, which TV Guide called an "inspired bluff". (quoted in Evans)) met with the network and came away reassured that the character would develop beyond stereotypes, that his brother Danny would become more understanding of Jodie's sexuality and that the sex change storyline would be dropped.

ABC's Standards and Practices department advised that Jodie should not be portrayed in a stereotypical fashion. At the same time it mandated that his relationship with Dennis could not be portrayed as either "explicit" or "intimate". In other words, they were not allowed to touch.

Soap premiered September 17, 1977. As the network had advised the gay groups, Danny's attitude toward Jodie's sexual orientation changed and the sex change storyline was wrapped up within the first several episodes. (Note: These were not concessions to the gay organizations, as series creator Susan Harris had already scripted the storylines before their meeting. (Capsuto, p. 141)) There were no known protests from the LGBT community. Although after his breakup with Dennis, Jodie became involved romantically with several women and his same-sex relationship activity was limited to a single date in one episode, the character maintained that he was gay throughout the complete run of the series.

== See also ==
- Transgender marriage
