= The Outrage (Marcus Welby, M.D.) =

1974 episode of Marcus Welby, M.D.

- Marcus Welby, M.D. episode
- Episode no.: Season 6 Episode 5
- Directed by: Bernard McEveety
- Written by: Eugene Price
- Original air date: October 8, 1974

Guest appearances
- Sean Kelly; Marla Adams; Gretchen Corbett; Edward Winter; Edward Power; Patrick Wayne

Episode chronology
← Previous "To Father a Child"	Next → "The Fatal Challenge"

"The Outrage" is the fifth episode of the sixth season of the American medical drama television series Marcus Welby, M.D., and the show's 127th episode overall. Written by Eugene Price and directed by Bernard McEveety, the episode tells the story of a teenage boy who is raped by his male teacher. The episode, which originally aired on ABC on October 8, 1974, sparked controversy and anger for its equation of homosexuality to pedophilia. "The Outrage" was targeted for protests by LGBT rights groups and several network affiliates refused to broadcast it.

== Plot ==
When teenager Ted Blakely's mother Marian finds blood on his sheets, she takes him to Dr. Welby. An examination of the boy's injuries confirms that he was sexually assaulted, but Ted is too ashamed to admit it. As Dr. Welby advises Marian, Ted sneaks away and returns to school. Ted's rapist, his science teacher Bill Swanson, convinces him not to report the assault, but Ted vows to kill him should Swanson ever touch him again. Ted's father George and stepmother Leah are unable to deal with Ted's assault. His father questions whether Ted could have stopped it, making Ted feel even more ashamed.

In addition to suffering psychological trauma, Ted needs surgery to repair the internal injuries caused by the rape. With Ted in surgery, Swanson is arrested while trying to molest a child. Ted awakens and is able to admit that the assault happened and that he is ready to speak out. Dr. Welby tells him that Swanson is in custody and, per his own request, has been transferred to a mental hospital. Police sergeant Buchanan reassures George that the rape had nothing to do with homosexuality and that Ted has handled himself like "a real man".

== Cast ==
- Robert Young as Dr. Marcus Welby
- James Brolin as Dr. Steven Kiley
- Elena Verdugo as Consuelo Lopez
- Sean Kelly as Ted Blakely
- Marla Adams as Marian Blakely
- Gretchen Corbett as Leah Blakely
- Edward Winter as Bill Swanson
- Edward Power as George Blakely
- Patrick Wayne as Sergeant Buchanan

== Background ==
Marcus Welby had been the target once before of gay protests. In 1973, the series featured an episode called "The Other Martin Loring". Loring, a middle-aged man, suffered from high blood pressure, diabetes, and alcoholism as a result of repressing his homosexuality. Dr. Welby is most concerned about the last and advises Loring that if he battles his sexual impulses he will not only enjoy improved health but will earn his son's respect. In response to this portrayal of homosexuality as an illness, the Gay Activists Alliance (GAA) organized a zap of ABC, with 30–40 members invading ABC's New York City headquarters and occupying the offices of ABC president Elton Rule and board chairman Leonard Goldenson. ABC made a few minor edits in response.

== Production and controversy ==
David Victor, creator of Marcus Welby, approached ABC in early 1974 with statistics compiled by the Los Angeles Police Department detailing the extent of child molestation. ABC gave him the go-ahead to order a script, which was written by Eugene Price. ABC sent the preliminary script for "The Outrage" to Ronald Gold, media director for the newly formed National Gay Task Force (NGTF), in July 1974. Gold had been involved with the GAA's actions against "The Other Martin Loring". Gold advised ABC's Standards and Practices department that the script, which conflated homosexuality with pedophilia, effeminacy, and the rape of children, was unacceptable in its present form. ABC ignored NGTF's request not to proceed. When Gold learned that the episode was in production, he brought in Loretta Lotman, head of the Boston-area gay media activist group Gay Media Action, to organize a nationwide grassroots campaign while he continued trying to work with ABC.

In response to the groups' concerns, ABC made some script changes. It removed some—but not all—references to Ted's "manhood" being violated by the assault. It also inserted a speech from the police officer: "There's nothing homosexual about this. It's a case of violent child molestation...[the typical offender is] a guy with severe mental and emotional problems. He's often married, middle-aged, with a crummy marriage, a crummier sex life or both....Technically, we call him a pedophile, a child molester." The network believed that its changes addressed the problems with the episode and contended that the episode was about pedophilia and not homosexuality. Richard Gitter of the network's Standards and Practices department defended the episode's social value, saying that "the importance of the script is to present to the public the problems of coping with such a tragic situation by the young assaulted victim. Not only is the physical damage to be repaired, but the mental damage involved in facing the assailant after the attack, reporting the incident to his family and authorities, pursuing prosecution through the judicial system and the return to emotional stability in facing his peers and his friends." In response to protest letters ABC sent a form letter claiming that gay leaders had approved the revised script, a claim that activists charged was false. The National Association of Broadcasters, a trade organization that maintained commercial and program guidelines for member broadcasters, approved the episode. Activists across the country remained concerned, especially since the episode's anticipated October broadcast date placed it close to several votes in state and local legislatures that would have extended anti-discrimination laws to cover sexual orientation. "We feel the program will definitely have a chilling effect on legislation which would protect gays from discrimination in employment and housing," stated NGTF executive director Bruce Voeller.

With ABC remaining unresponsive, NGTF and other activists began targeting advertisers and affiliates. Forging alliances with the American Federation of Teachers, the AFL-CIO, and the American Psychiatric Association, the coalition was successful in dissuading 17 ABC affiliates, including those in Boston and Philadelphia, from running the episode. This was the first known instance of network affiliates refusing a network episode in response to protests. Demonstrations were held on the day of the broadcast outside stations in Dallas, San Francisco, Madison, Chicago, Denver, Los Angeles, Washington, D.C., and in small towns in Ohio, Iowa, Mississippi, Texas, and Idaho. The Washington, D.C., affiliate ran disclaimers before and after "The Outrage" to clarify that homosexuality did not equal pedophilia. Several sponsors, including Bayer, Gallo Wine, Listerine, Ralston-Purina, Colgate-Palmolive, Shell Oil, Lipton, American Home Products, Breck, Sterling Drug, and Gillette, refused to advertise during the episode. Lower ratings and reduced ad sales translated into a good deal of lost revenue for ABC and, following another successful protest (against NBC, centered on "Flowers of Evil", a Police Woman episode about a trio of killer lesbians), the network decided not to rerun "The Outrage" (NBC also withdrew "Flowers of Evil" from its rerun schedule).

== Critical response ==
"The Outrage" and its attendant protests raised serious questions in the minds of critics. John J. O'Connor, writing for The New York Times, sympathized with the concerns of the demonstrators but asked, "At what point does the understandable anxiety of homosexual groups become censorship or prior restraint?" Critic Frank Swertlow for United Press International, while recognizing the right of gay groups to object to the episode, echoed these concerns, asking, "In an era when pressure groups are demanding changes on TV, at what point does a group have the right to try to censor a show because it offends them? At what point should the program be dropped because of the pressure? And at what point should a network, given the sensitivity of the subject, sanitize or avoid a controversial topic because it offends a minority?" Ultimately Swertlow supported the right of the network to air the episode, saying that it deals with concepts that are "facts of life, and it is time we faced them openly". Each critic suggested that Marcus Welby was not the proper venue for a serious discussion of male-on-male rape, pedophilia, or child molestation. O'Connor contended that ABC made a mistake trying to "force" the subject into the "rigid format" of the Welby program. Swertlow was harsher, suggesting that Welby was the wrong format for any subject with "intellectual merit" and dismissed the premise of the episode as "exploitative trash". Each believed that a documentary special or made-for-television film would have been a better forum, with O'Connor citing the recent Linda Blair vehicle Born Innocent as an example.

Regarding the quality of the episode, response was largely negative. O'Connor called the script and the production "dreadful". Swertlow was again harsher, saying the episode was about "a sensitive subject wrapped in a can of garbage [that] has been raised to a level it does not deserve". Writing for the Associated Press, critic Jay Sharbutt dismissed the ending as a "cop-out" filled with "the usual kindly Welby blather". Calling the episode "poorly written and awkwardly acted", he sums up the episode as, while not "tasteless, offensive or sensationalized...a show you can afford to miss, unless you're really curious or a hard-core blather fan".

== See also ==
- List of 1970s American television episodes with LGBT themes
