= List of 1970s American television episodes with LGBTQ themes =

Following the Stonewall riots and the birth of the modern gay rights movement in 1969, gay activists began challenging the way American television episodes with LGBTQ themes presented homosexuality. With the slowly increasing visibility of LGBTQ characters on fiction series, a pattern began to emerge, beginning with repressed lesbian sniper Miss Brant from 1961's The Asphalt Jungle and continuing through a murderous female impersonator from The Streets of San Francisco and Police Woman and her trio of killer lesbians in 1974 and beyond, of presenting LGBTQ characters as psychotic killers on crime dramas. On medical dramas, the disease model of homosexuality was fostered in characters like 1963's Hallie Lambert from The Eleventh Hour and Martin Loring from Marcus Welby, M.D. in 1973. Gays, the viewing public was told over and over, were simultaneously dangerous and sick, to be feared and to be pitied.

In response to complaints about several early portrayals, networks began vetting scripts with gay characters or content through two recently formed advocacy groups, the National Gay Task Force and the Gay Media Task Force. Several episodes saw substantive changes based on these consultations, but in other instances, notably the Marcus Welby, M.D. episode "The Other Martin Loring", only minor changes were made and groups like the Gay Activists Alliance led zaps, raucous demonstrations, against the networks. Protests against the 1974 Marcus Welby, M.D. episode "The Outrage", with its male child molestation plot, and the aforementioned killer lesbian trio from the Police Woman episode "Flowers of Evil" led producers to start moving away from the killer queer plot device. Gays and lesbians would continue to be portrayed as killers but their motives would less frequently be related to their sexuality. Gays started killing out of greed and jealousy, just like heterosexuals. Other dramas not legal or medical in nature also ran occasional episodes featuring LGBTQ characters.

Sitcoms too began presenting LGBTQ characters, with All in the Family producing several episodes on the theme beginning in 1971. Gay sitcom episodes tended to follow one of a handful of plot devices: a character close to a lead character would unexpectedly come out, forcing the characters to confront their own issues with homosexuality; a lead character is mistaken for gay; a lead character pretends to be gay (a recurring theme in Three's Company, where Jack Tripper (John Ritter) has to pretend to be gay so that his landlord(s) would allow him to live with two single female roommates); or, more rarely, a recurring character from the series comes out. In the first instance, it was rare that the gay character would ever make another appearance. Dating back to Robert Reed's turn as a transgender doctor on Medical Center in 1975, transgender characters and issues have tended to receive sympathetic treatment.

This list covers American television episodes with LGBTQ themes that aired from 1970 through 1979.

== Episodes ==
Year	Series	Network	Episode	Synopsis
1970	The Dick Cavett Show	ABC	"November 26"	Episode featuring discussion of gay issues and gay representatives.
1970	Medical Center	CBS	"Undercurrent"	A gay research scientist Dr. Ben Teverly (Paul Burke), becomes the target of an anonymous smear campaign.
1970	The Phil Donahue Show	Syndicated	"May 1970"	Barbara Gittings and Lilli Vincenz appeared; they were the first lesbians to go on a nationally syndicated TV show.
1970	Newsfront	WNDT	June 24, 1970	Seven gay liberation leaders appeared on the June 24 episode.
1971	All in the Family	CBS	"Judging Books by Covers"	Archie Bunker (Carroll O'Connor) finds out that Steve (Philip Carey), a former pro football player and one of his all-American drinking buddies, is gay.
1971	Dan August	ABC	"Dead Witness to a Killing"	In line for a job with the government, Arthur kills his lover Norman Sayles (portrayed by Martin Sheen), to prevent him from exposing Arthur as gay during his background check.
1971	The David Susskind Show	Syndicated	"Women Who Love Women"	The show invited seven lesbian women to be on a discussion panel. The lesbians included Barbara Gittings and Lilli Vincenz. They debated long-held stereotypes about gays.
1971	Room 222	ABC	"What Is a Man?"	A high school boy named Howard (Frederick Herrick) becomes a target of schoolyard homophobia for performing a female role in Shakespeare's Twelfth Night.
1972	The Bold Ones: The New Doctors	NBC	"Discovery at Fourteen"	Fourteen year old Cory Melino (Ron Howard), discovers that his divorced father is gay when he makes a surprise visit to his house. Jane Wyman has a guest role as Dr. Amanda Fallon, who scolds the mother and grandfather (Jim Davis) for hiding this information from Cory.
1972	The Bold Ones: The New Doctors	NBC	"A Very Strange Triangle"	Dr. Marty Cohen's (Robert Walden) attempts to rekindle his relationship with nurse Valerie DeMarco (Donna Mills) are complicated by the fact that Valerie is currently involved with Eleanor (Hildy Brooks).
1972	The Corner Bar	ABC	"Politics"	The series is notable for its inclusion of the first recurring gay character on American television, Peter Panama (played by Vincent Schiavelli).
1972	Hawaii Five-O	CBS	"Two Doves and Mr. Heron"	When "hippie freak" Ryan Moore (John Ritter) tries to hustle Edward Heron (Vic Morrow) for cash, he has no luck. Instead, Heron starts to feel Moore up, suggesting he will part with some of his money for a homosexual tryst. Moore hits Heron on the head with a two by four and steals his wallet, later commenting in an effeminate voice, "He deserved it, the closet queen."
1972	Hawaii Five-O	CBS	"Didn't We Meet At A Murder?"	Three people, all of whom have something to hide in their pasts, are blackmailed to participate in an intricate "perfect-crime" scheme involving the murder of a Chicago mobster. One of them is Frank Wellman (Bill Edwards), "a one-man welcoming committee" from the Honolulu Business Council, who is secretly a "homosexual [and] transvestite ... classic subject for blackmail." When he realizes he is under police surveillance, Wellman commits suicide, leaping from his apartment building. Later, when Five-O goes to Wellman's place, Steve McGarrett (Jack Lord) tells his second-in-command Danny Williams (James MacArthur) pictures of women on Wellman's wall are "men."
1972	Hawaii Five-O	CBS	"V for Vashon: The Patriarch"	Attorney Harvey Matheson Drew (John Stalker) is the only person who can get Steve McGarrett (Jack Lord) off a rap of murder. In court, Drew says the sound of gunfire which caused McGarrett to kill a shooter may have been the noise from a backfiring car, resulting in McGarrett's conviction. Investigation by Five-O finds Drew knew someone named Bobby Raisbeck (John Beatty). Although Raisbeck has been in jail for drug possession, prior to this he was living in a $500 a month apartment where Drew had paid the rent for a year in advance, because the two of them were having a homosexual affair. When Drew freaks out over being exposed, Raisbeck tells him, "You're getting what's coming to you, you old queen."
1972	Here's Lucy	CBS	"Lucy and Jim Bailey"	Female impersonator Jim Bailey guest stars.
1972	Owen Marshall: Counselor at Law	ABC	"Words of Summer"	Ann Glover (Meredith Baxter) is accused of molesting a young girl (Denise Nickerson) and to clear her name her former roommate Meg (Kristina Holland) is forced to come out as a lesbian. Meg was the first young adult character to state unequivocally that she was a lesbian on a TV drama.
1972	Sanford and Son	NBC	"The Piano Movers"	Fred (Redd Foxx) and (Demond Wilson) move a piano from a gay man's apartment.
1973	Marcus Welby, M.D.	ABC	"The Other Martin Loring"	Loring (Mark Miller) is secretly gay and about to be divorced. Dr. Welby (Robert Young) suggests that he is not really homosexual but his fear of being homosexual is making him believe that he is. The Gay Activists Alliance denounced the episode.
1973	Mary Tyler Moore Show	CBS	"My Brother's Keeper"	Phyllis (Cloris Leachman) wants to set up her visiting brother Ben (Robert Moore) with Mary. Phyllis' brother is gay.
1973	Medical Center	CBS	"Impasse"	Dr. Claymore is a lesbian and a psychiatrist called in to handle a heart patient, Tobi, who's not taking her medicine. In his book Alternate Channels, author Steven Capsuto cites Annie Claymore as "American TV's first productive, happy lesbian character."
1973	The Pat Collins Show	WCBS-TV	"A Night at the Continental Baths"	The half‐hour show was devoted to an on location portrait of the Continental Baths, a gay bathhouse in the basement of The Ansonia Hotel in New York City, described by Miss Collins as a sort of "Grossinger's of the gay set."
1973	Sanford and Son	NBC	"Lamont, Is That You?"	Fred (Redd Foxx) gets the wrong idea when Lamont (Demond Wilson) and Rollo (Nathaniel Taylor) are seen coming out of a gay bar.
1973	The Streets of San Francisco	ABC	"A Collection of Eagles"	Vince Hagopian Jr. (John Saxon) is a numismatist who is secretly in a relationship with both Tommy Hendriksen (William Gray Espy) and Karen Pearson (Belinda Montgomery). Vince uses both Tommy and Karen in a plot to switch a wealthy collector's (Joseph Cotten) gold double-eagle coins with counterfeits. Tommy becomes increasingly jealous of Vince's affection toward Karen, and Vince murders Tommy by giving him and overdose of insulin. Later in the episode, Vince attempts to murder Karen in the same manner but is stopped by Det. Lt. Stone (Karl Malden) and Insp. Keller (Michael Douglas).
1974	The David Susskind Show	Syndicated	"Gay Men and Lesbians in the Professions"	Guests included a professor, a registered nurse, a journalist and a doctor.
1974	Harry O	ABC	"Coinage of the Realm"	Joe Heston (David Dukes) and Fred Lassiter (Granville Van Dusen) are a pair of gay hit men.
1974	The Lou Gordon Program	Syndicated	"Are Gays Going to Hell?"	The Lou Gordon Program was a 90-minute television show, that aired Saturday and Sunday nights.
1974	Marcus Welby, M.D.	ABC	"The Outrage"	A high school teacher molests one of his students. The student, initially can not admit that he was assaulted but his injuries require surgery. As he recovers, the police arrest his teacher trying to molest another child, and the teacher is transported to a mental institution. The National Gay Task Force tried to work with ABC but ultimately still found the episode unacceptable. Seventeen ABC affiliates refused to air the episode.
1974	M*A*S*H	CBS	"George"	George tells Hawkeye that he was beaten up by soldiers from his unit after he got drunk and inadvertently admitted to being gay.
1974	Maude	CBS	"Maude's New Friend"	Walter is upset to hear that Maude's new friend, Barry Witherspoon, a local gay novelist, will be stopping by for drinks, feeling that he is a "pompous windbag."
1974	Police Story	NBC	"The Ripper"	The owner of a modeling agency (Peter Mark Richman) is slashing gay men to death as part of his plan to rid the world of "undesirables", including homosexuals, drug addicts, prostitutes and "the lame and the blind". Three members of the Gay Media Task Force served as consultants on the episode.
1974	Police Woman	NBC	"Flowers of Evil"	A lesbian gang that runs a nursing home is killing off their clients. Pepper (Angie Dickinson) tries to persuade Janet to testify against her lover Gladys and tells Janet about her lesbian college roommate. The group Lesbian Feminist Liberation staged a sit-in at NBC and, after meeting with gay activists, the network agreed not to rerun the episode.
1974	The Streets of San Francisco	ABC	"Mask of Death"	A female impersonator (John Davidson) is famed for his impersonations of actresses Carol Channing and (the fictional) Carol Marlowe. The Marlowe persona takes over and begins stabbing men to death with a hatpin. Jim Bailey provided the voice for Davidson's Channing impersonation.
1974	This Is the Life	Syndicated	"The Secret"	A well respected teacher at a boys' school comes out of the closet.
1975	All in the Family	CBS	"Archie the Hero"	Archie saves the life of a drag queen known as Beverly LaSalle (Lori Shannon) – who he thinks is a woman – by administering artificial respiration and is chagrined when the rescue draws media attention.
1975	Barney Miller	ABC	"Experience"	Marty (Jack DeLeon), a gay man, is arrested and his character is introduced to the series.
1975	Barney Miller	ABC	"Discovery"	Darryl (Ray Stewart) and Marty (Jack DeLeon), a gay couple, allege that an officer from the 12th Precinct is extorting the gay community. A sergeant from another precinct apprehends the suspect and delivers him to the 12th, casually coming out in the process.
1975	The Bob Crane Show	NBC	"A Case of Misdiagnosis"	Bob Wilcox (Bob Crane) treats an old friend, Charles (John Astin), who praises him in a newspaper story. The story identifies Charles as a prominent gay activist. At first, Bob is worried that others will assume he is gay too but soon changes his attitude after his coworker makes homophobic remarks about his friend. Bob responds by calling his coworker a "miserable, pea brained bigot." In the final scene, Charles appears at Bob's door with flowers- not for him but for his wife, Ellie (Patricia Harty), and thanks the couple for their friendship.
1975	Doctors' Hospital	NBC	"Watchman, Who Will Guard Thy Sleep?"	A patient is cared for by a gay orderly.
1975	Medical Center	CBS	"The Fourth Sex (Parts 1 and 2)"	Robert Reed plays transgender Doctor Pat Caddison who decides to have sexual reassignment surgery.
1975	Tomorrow	NBC	"Gays and Military Service"	Discussion whether gays should be allowed to service in the military.
1976	Alice	CBS	"Alice Gets a Pass"	Alice (Linda Lavin) falls for Jack (Denny Miller), an ex-pro football player. When he comes out, Alice hesitates about allowing her son to accompany him on a fishing trip. She later realizes that Jack's sexual preference does not make any difference when it comes to taking care of a child and lets him go on the trip.
1976	All in the Family	CBS	"Beverly Rides Again"	Archie sets his friend Pinky up on a blind date with Beverly as a practical joke.
1976	Barney Miller	ABC	"Quarantine Parts 1 and 2"	Marty and Jack visit the precinct to see if Barney will be a character reference for Marty. They are forced to stay and quarantine with everyone in the precinct after a detainee collapses on the floor and is suspected of having smallpox.
1976	The Bob Newhart Show	CBS	"Some of My Best Friends Are..."	Howard Hesseman plays Craig Plager, a gay patient who joins Dr. Hartley's long-standing therapy group.
1976	Bronk	CBS	"The Deadlier Sex"	Sara (Julie Sommars), the first female officer assigned to Bronk's (Jack Palance) department, is accused of molesting a female prisoner.
1976	Executive Suite	CBS	"Sounds of Silence"	Julie (Geraldine Brooks) comes out as a lesbian to her best friend Leona.
1976	Family	ABC	"Rites of Friendship"	Family friend Zeke (Bryan Byers) is caught in a raid on a gay bar. The Lawrence family take him in when his father throws him out of the house, but son Willie (Gary Frank) has difficulty understanding and accepting Zeke. Willie eventually accepts and befriends Zeke.
1976	The Jeffersons	CBS	"The Breakup: Part 1"	A two-part episode begins with Lionel's difficulty writing a paper on homosexuality. The issue at hand changes after George buys him a term paper. Tempers flare, and he splits with Jenny.
1976	Kojak	CBS	"A Need to Know"	A foreign diplomat (Hector Elizondo) is accused of molesting two young boys but must be released because he has diplomatic immunity. The National Gay Task Force issued a "media alert" regarding the episode, believing that viewers would interpret the molester as gay. CBS made no changes to the episode in response but Washington, D.C. affiliate WTOP ran a disclaimer before the episode noting that it dealt with molestation and not homosexuality.
1976	Mary Hartman, Mary Hartman	CBS	"Episode 126"	Ed (Larry Haddon) and Howard are revealed to be lovers, and later on, Ed threatens to walk out on Howard.
1976	Maude	CBS	"Arthur's Worry"	Walter (Bill Macy) is upset about a dream in which he kisses best friend Arthur (Conrad Bain).
1976	Phyllis	CBS	"Out of the Closet"	Phyllis (Cloris Leachman) is relieved to learn that her new boyfriend (Edward Winter) is gay because she was worried that he did not find her attractive.
1976	Police Woman	NBC	"Trial by Prejudice"	Marlena (Patricia Crowley), Pepper's lesbian friend and former roommate, is hesitant to publicly defend Pepper from charges that she sexually molested a female suspect for fear of her own reputation being ruined.
1976	The Practice	NBC	"Helen's Beau"	Jules arranges a date for Helen (Didi Conn) with a young medical intern, Dr. Byron Fisk (Barry Gordon). She thinks Byron is her new boyfriend – but is the last to realize that Byron is gay.
1976	Sanford and Son	NBC	"The Stakeout"	Fred develops a crush on new tenant Miss Wallace (Charles Weldon). When Miss Wallace is unmasked as a male fence (criminal) named Alex Hacker, Fred and other characters begin questioning Fred's sexuality.
1976	Sirota's Court	NBC	"Court Fear"	Judge Sirota (Michael Constantine) marries a gay male couple.
1977	The 700 Club	CBN	"The Threat of Militant Homosexuality"	Discussion about Anita Bryant and the 1977 political coalition Save Our Children.
1977	All in the Family	CBS	"Cousin Liz"	Archie and Edith (Jean Stapleton) attend the funeral of Liz, Edith's cousin. Afterward, Liz's friend Veronica (K Callan), a teacher, reveals she and Liz were more than just roommates. Edith is surprised but quickly accepting, allowing Veronica to keep a tea set she had been bequeathed.
1977	All in the Family	CBS	"Edith's Crisis of Faith"	In the two-part "Edith's Crisis of Faith", Beverly, a drag queen is murdered, causing Edith to question her belief in God.
1977	Barney Miller	ABC	"Asylum"	A gay musician (Ion Teodorescu) from the Soviet Union seeks political asylum. In another plotline, Marty is caught with Marijuana. Series creator Danny Arnold worked closely with the National Gay Task Force in developing the characters of Darryl and Marty.
1977	Baretta	ABC	"The Sky Is Falling"	Baretta (Robert Blake) befriends Tommy (Barry Miller), a teenage hustler, after he witnesses a john murder his friend and fellow hustler Jeff (John Herbsleb).
1977	C.P.O. Sharkey	NBC	"Sharkey's Big Secret"	The men mistakenly think Sharkey (Don Rickles) is gay when they spot an effeminate man going into his office.
1977	Carter Country	ABC	"Out of the Closet"	Chief Roy (Victor French) is stunned when his old friend and fishing buddy Bill (Richard Jaeckel) reveals he is gay. Bill loses his job as a teacher, and the chief testifies on his behalf before the school board.
1977	Family	ABC	"We Love You, Miss Jessup"	Buddy (Kristy McNichol) learns that her favorite teacher is a lesbian when she resigns following a PTA witch hunt. (In 2012, McNichol herself came out as lesbian.)
1977	The Jeffersons	CBS	"Once a Friend"	"Once a Friend" features one of the first transgender characters on American television in the person of Edie Stokes (Veronica Redd), who George knows as an old Navy buddy named Eddie.
1977	Maude	CBS	"The Gay Bar"	Maude's neighbor Arthur (Conrad Bain), is outraged about a new gay bar in town, so she takes him there to change Arthur's bigoted mind through thoughtful conversation with a young patron.
1977	The Richard Pryor Show	NBC	"Episode #1.3"	A woman describes a lesbian encounter.
1977	The Rockford Files	NBC	"Requiem for a Funny Box"	The gay son of a mafia leader is forced to come out to his father after being blackmailed by a comedian. When an attempt to murder the comedian fails, the mafia leader orders his son to be executed to avoid shaming the family.
1977	Starsky and Hutch	ABC	"Death in a Different Place"	Game show host Art Fleming plays a bisexual cop murdered by a corrupt fellow officer after witnessing him making a drug deal. Charles Pierce appears as a female impersonator.
1977	The Streets of San Francisco	ABC	"A Good Cop, But..."	Inspector Lambert (Barry Primus) has to come out to convict a drug dealer. His partner (Robert Walden) initially is unable to accept his gay partner but eventually comes to terms.
1977	The Streets of San Francisco	ABC	"Once a Con..."	A lesbian college student named Jackie Collins (Devon Ericson) murders her lover's (Joanne Nail) best friend out of jealousy.
1977	Three's Company	ABC	"Strange Bedfellows"	Mr. Roper (Norman Fell) thinks he's gay when he wakes up in bed with Jack (John Ritter).
1977	Westside Medical	ABC	"The Mermaid"	A post-operative MTF East German Olympic swimmer (Betsy Slade) wants to defect because her government will not allow her to live fully as a woman.
1978	All in the Family	CBS	"The Commercial"	An effeminate commercial director (Darryl Hickman) directs a commercial that Edith is starring in. While on set, Archie asks him if he is gay.
1978	The Rockford Files	NBC	"The Empty Frame"	A trio of Berkeley Communists raid an elite dinner party being hosted by a gay couple and steal some of their valuable paintings. The gay couple hire Rockford (James Garner) to recover the paintings.
1978	WKRP in Cincinnati	CBS	"Les on a Ledge"	Les Nessman (Richard Sanders) threatens to jump out of the station's building after rumors circulate about his sexual orientation. In a subplot, Johnny Fever (Howard Hesseman) tries to stop Herb (Frank Bonner) from sexually harassing receptionist Jennifer (Loni Anderson) by telling Herb that Jennifer used to be a man.
1979	ABC News Closeup	ABC	"Homosexuals"	This episode looked into the contributions that gay people have made to society and aired on December 18, 1979.
1979	Archie Bunker's Place	CBS	"The Cook"	Veronica Rooney (Anne Meara) is hired as the cook and insists that her openly gay nephew Fred (Dean Scofield) is hired as a waiter.
1979	Barney Miller	ABC	"Inquisition"	Inspector Scanlon (George Murdock) of Internal Affairs investigates an anonymous letter from a gay cop. Officer Zatelli (Dino Natali) comes out to Barney (Hal Linden).
1979	The Baxters	Syndicated	"Homosexual Teachers"	The family finds out that a favorite teacher is gay, and the father must decide whether to sign a petition calling for him to be fired.
1979	Dallas	CBS	"Call Girl"	J.R. Ewing (Larry Hagman) tries to blackmail Pam with lesbian photographs.
1979	Dallas	CBS	"Royal Marriage"	J.R. Ewing (Larry Hagman) has high hopes for the upcoming marriage of his niece Lucy (Charlene Tilton) and Kit Mainwaring (Mark Wheeler), son of an oilman with whom J.R. hopes to do business. When Kit reveals his homosexuality to J.R., he still insists the wedding go on.
1979	Dallas	CBS	"The Outsiders"	Kit Mainwaring (Mark Wheeler) comes out to Lucy (Charlene Tilton).
1979	The Facts of Life	NBC	"Rough Housing"	Tomboyish Cindy (Julie Anne Haddock) confides to Mrs. Garrett (Charlotte Rae) that because she likes sports, dislikes dresses, and feels uncomfortable around boys, she thinks she is not normal. Mrs. Garrett convinces her that two girls can show affection even if they are not gay.
1979	Kate Loves a Mystery	NBC	"Feelings Can Be Murder"	Kate (Kate Mulgrew) investigates the murder of a married bisexual woman. Suspects include her married female lover.
1979	Lou Grant	CBS	"Cop"	Lou's neighbor is murdered, and it is revealed that the victim was secretly gay and was killed by another gay man. Meanwhile, a fire at a gay bar kills five men and Lou (Edward Asner) insists on publishing their names despite this meaning they will be labeled gay and may not have been out. By withholding the names this time, he argues, the public will question whether the paper is withholding information in the future.
1979	The White Shadow	CBS	"One of the Boys"	Ray Collins (Peter Horton) transfers to Carver High because of a rumor at his old school that he is gay. When the rumor starts circulating at Carver, Ray considers dropping out but after a talk with Vice Principal Buchanan (Joan Pringle) he decides to return to his old school.

== See also ==
- List of 1980s American television episodes with LGBT themes
- List of 1990s American television episodes with LGBT themes
- List of made-for-television films with LGBT characters
- List of pre-Stonewall American television episodes with LGBT themes
- Lists of television programs with LGBT characters
