= Cousin Liz =

- All in the Family episode
- Veronica struggles to explain her relationship with Liz' cousin Edith.
- Episode no.: Season 8 Episode 3
- Directed by: Paul Bogart
- Story by: Harve Brosten; Barry Harman
- Teleplay by: Bob Schiller; Bob Weiskopf
- Editing by: Harold McKenzie
- Original air date: October 9, 1977
- Running time: 24 minutes

Guest appearance
- K Callan as Veronica Cartwright

Episode chronology
← Previous "Archie Gets the Business"	Next → "Edith's 50th Birthday"

"Cousin Liz" is an episode of the American television sitcom All in the Family. The story concerns Edith Bunker's inheritance of a silver tea service from her deceased cousin Liz and her decision to let her lesbian lover keep the tea service to remember Liz by. The second episode of the eighth season, "Cousin Liz" originally aired on October 9, 1977 on CBS.

"Cousin Liz" was critically acclaimed, winning an Emmy Award for its script. The episode aired at a time when protections for gay rights were being challenged through ballot initiatives, and one of the writers believed that "Cousin Liz" was associated with the defeat of one such initiative.

== Plot ==
Archie Bunker (Carroll O'Connor) and his wife Edith (Jean Stapleton) travel out of town to attend the funeral of Edith's cousin Liz. Archie wonders how much Edith, as Liz's closest living relative, will inherit from Liz's estate. Edith says that she doesn't stand to inherit much because Liz worked as a teacher for 25 years, and since teaching didn't (and doesn't) pay much, she rented an apartment with her friend and colleague, Veronica Cartwright (K Callan), to save money.

After the funeral, Archie and Edith attend the repast at Liz and Veronica's apartment, where Archie speculates about what items in the apartment Edith will inherit. She responds that the only thing she will inherit is a valuable sterling silver tea and coffee service, an heirloom which has been in Edith's family for 100 years. Archie initially scoffs at the tea service until Edith tells him that it is worth at least $2,000.

Overhearing their conversation, Veronica pulls Edith aside into the bedroom to speak with her privately. Veronica asks to keep the tea service, explaining that for 25 years she and Liz spent an hour together every afternoon over tea. It is then that Veronica reveals that she and Liz were more than just friends, colleagues, and roommates: they had been in a committed lesbian relationship for the past 25 years. After some initial confusion and shock, Edith immediately accepts Veronica and Liz's relationship and gives Veronica the tea service.

As the Bunkers prepare to leave, Archie instructs Edith to collect the tea service. Edith informs Archie that she has given the service to Veronica and explains their relationship. Archie hits the roof and demands that Veronica return the tea service, and when she refuses, he threatens to sue her, which would expose her relationship with Liz and possibly cause her to lose her job. Edith pleads with Archie that Veronica "can't help how she feels," and that it would be very mean-spirited to cause Veronica to lose her job by exposing her secret. Archie relents and allows Veronica to have the tea service, but gives her advice that she should go straight. Veronica gives Archie a peck on the cheek and says goodbye to the Bunkers. Edith also kisses Archie because he did the right thing.

== Critical response and cultural impact ==
Bob Schiller, Bob Weiskopf, Harve Brosten and Barry Harman received the Primetime Emmy Award for Outstanding Writing for a Comedy Series for writing "Cousin Liz". The episode was cited by The Christian Science Monitor as being "compassionate" and Veronica's coming out to Edith as "one of the most delicately handled sequences of the entire series".

"Cousin Liz" aired at a time when Anita Bryant and her Save Our Children coalition were sponsoring a series of ballot initiatives to repeal gay anti-discrimination ordinances across the country. Notably in California, state senator John Briggs was sponsoring the Briggs Initiative, which would have barred gay and lesbian people from working in the state's public schools. Writer Barry Harman recalls that series creator Norman Lear (who has cited "Cousin Liz" as among his favorite episodes) wanted to do an episode that commented on the issue of gay teachers. Although Harman misremembered the year that "Cousin Liz" was first broadcast, he recalled that it was repeated soon before voters decided on the Briggs Initiative and associated the defeat of that initiative with the message of the episode.

== See also ==
- List of 1970s American television episodes with LGBT themes
