= Harve Brosten =

American screenwriter

- Born: May 15, 1943 (age 83); Chicago, Illinois, U.S.
- Other name: Harvey Brosten
- Occupation: Screenwriter/director
- Years active: 1971–1977

Harve Brosten (born May 15, 1943, in Chicago, Illinois) is an American Emmy Award-winning screenwriter for television. Brosten is best known for working on All in the Family, a sitcom from the mid-1970s.

== Credits ==
- All in the Family (TV series) 1975-1977
- The Jeffersons (TV series) 1975
- Romance, Romance (produced for the Broadway stage by)
- Shamus (assistant to director, assistant to producer) 1973
- The Anderson Tapes (assistant to producer) 1971

== Awards and nominations ==
- 1978: Won the Primetime Emmy Award for Outstanding Writing for a Comedy Series, with Bob Weiskopf, Barry Michael Harman, and Bob Schiller, for All in the Family
- 1988: Nominated for the Tony Award for Best Musical for Romance/Romance, with Dasha Epstein and Jay S. Bulmash
