= The Ann Sothern Show =

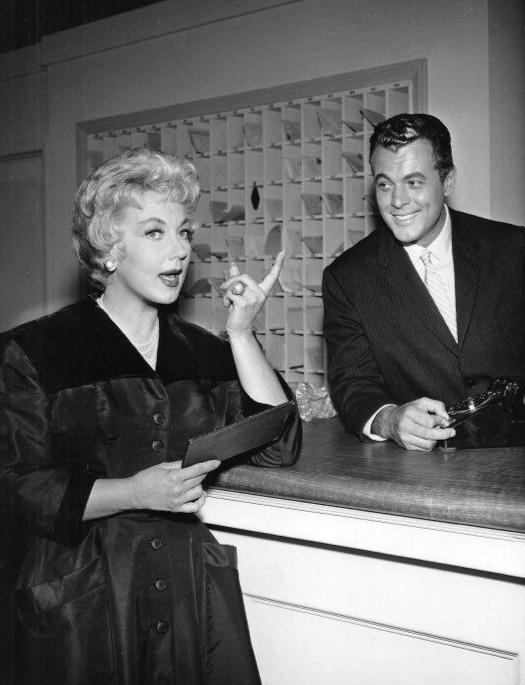
- Cast members Ann Sothern and Jacques Scott in a publicity shot
- Genre: Sitcom
- Created by: Bob Schiller; Bob Weiskopf
- Starring: Ann Sothern; Don Porter; Ann Tyrrell; Ernest Truex; Reta Shaw; Jacques Scott; Jack Mullaney; Ken Berry; Jesse White
- Theme music composer: Bonnie Lake; Ann Sothern
- Opening theme: "Katy"
- Composers: Gordon Zahler; Leith Stevens
- Country of origin: United States
- Original language: English
- No. of seasons: 3
- No. of episodes: 93 (list of episodes)

Production
- Executive producer: Desi Arnaz
- Producer: Arthur Hoffe
- Cinematography: Robert Pittack
- Running time: 24 mins.
- Production companies: Anso Productions; Desilu Productions

Original release
- Network: CBS
- Release: October 6, 1958 – March 30, 1961

The Ann Sothern Show is an American sitcom starring Ann Sothern that aired on CBS for three seasons from October 6, 1958, to March 30, 1961. Created by Bob Schiller and Bob Weiskopf, the series was the second starring vehicle for Sothern, who had previously starred in Private Secretary, which also aired on CBS from 1953 to 1957.

Sothern portrayed the character Katy O'Connor, the assistant manager of the upscale New York City hotel The Bartley House. Co-stars for the series included Ann Tyrrell, Don Porter and Jesse White who had also co-starred with her in Private Secretary.

== Synopsis ==
Sothern starred as Katy O'Connor, the assistant manager of a New York City hotel: The Bartley House. Katy frequently deals with the hotel's eccentric guests, alongside either her secretary and best friend/roommate Olive Smith (Ann Tyrrell), or her boss, Jason McCauley (Ernest Truex), who is frequently bullied by his wife Flora (Reta Shaw). Katy was also an advanced character for her time, in that she was a woman who had a position of authority. In this position, she oversaw many male employees, including lovestruck bellboy Johnny Wallace (Jack Mullaney) and suave French room clerk Paul Monteney (Jacques Scott). Storylines typically revolve around the personal lives of the staff and guests of the Bartley House. The setting of a hotel gave the series a chance to introduce a plentiful number of guest stars, often playing guests of the hotel.

Midway through its first season, the series underwent a retooling to improve ratings. The McCauleys are transferred to a Bartley House branch in Calcutta, and Katy is given a new boss, James Devery (Don Porter). Whereas Katy and McCauley had a strictly professional relationship seen on an equal level, Katy and Devery's relationship is much more complex. Devery often asserts his authority over Katy, and the two frequently go toe-to-toe with one another over various things. A romantic undertone to the relationship becomes apparent by the final season, and was addressed shortly before the series was cancelled. Due to the retooling, the characters of Johnny Wallace and Paul Monteney also begin to be limited. Jacques Scott was written out after the end of the first season; Jack Mullaney was initially retained for season two, but also written out after the first few episodes.

The Ann Sothern Show had strong ties to Sothern's previous CBS sitcom Private Secretary, which had ended a year before the debut of The Ann Sothern Show. Sothern's characters of Susie MacNamara and Katy O'Connor were similar, though O'Connor held a position of authority MacNamara did not have. Tyrrell had portrayed the character of Violet "Vi" Praskins, who was nearly identical to her character of Olive Smith. Porter's character of James Devery was also similar to his role of talent agent Peter Sands. Jesse White had a recurring role on both series, playing the antagonist to the central characters.

== Cast ==
Actor	Character	Season		
Actor	Character	1	2	3
Ann Sothern	Katy O'Connor	Main	Main	Main
Ernest Truex	Jason McCauley	Main		
Ann Tyrrell	Olive Smith	Main	Main	Main
Reta Shaw	Flora McCauley	Also starring		
Jacques Scott	Paul Monteney	Also starring		
Jack Mullaney	Johnny Wallace	Also starring	Recurring	
Don Porter	James Devery	Main	Main	Main

- Ann Sothern as Kathleen "Katy" O'Connor: the witty, perceptive assistant manager at The Bartley House, an upscale hotel in New York City. She frequently deals with the various situations that arise from the eccentric customers, or her boss (initially Mr. McCauley, later Mr. Devery). Katy is a spinster, but takes some pride in that fact. Throughout the series, a potential romance between Katy and Mr. Devery lingered; it is finally touched upon in what became the series finale, ending on a cliffhanger ultimately never answered.
- Ann Tyrrell as Olive Smith: Katy's secretary and roommate. Olive is a bit scatter-brained and naive, often deferring important decisions to Katy. Nonetheless, she means the best, and is a loyal friend to Katy. Also a spinster, Olive is a romantic often relegated to unrequited crushes such as Paul. In the third season, Olive begins dating – and later marries – dentist Dr. Delbert Gray.
- Don Porter as James Arlington Devery: Katy's second boss, who is the manager of The Bartley House. Devery is a younger manager than McCauley, and is a much more stern, stubborn manager than he is. Devery tends to get carried away with new ideas, and frequently finds himself at odds against Katy. In what turned out to be the series finale, Devery realizes he is in love with Katy, and impulsively proposes to her; Katy kisses him back, but leaves her answer on an unanswered cliffhanger.

Tyrrell and Porter were both series regulars on Private Secretary, playing the roles of Vi Praskins and Peter Sands. Unlike Tyrrell, Porter was not initially carried over to The Ann Sothern Show, but was introduced after a midseason retooling of the cast.

=== Semi-regulars ===
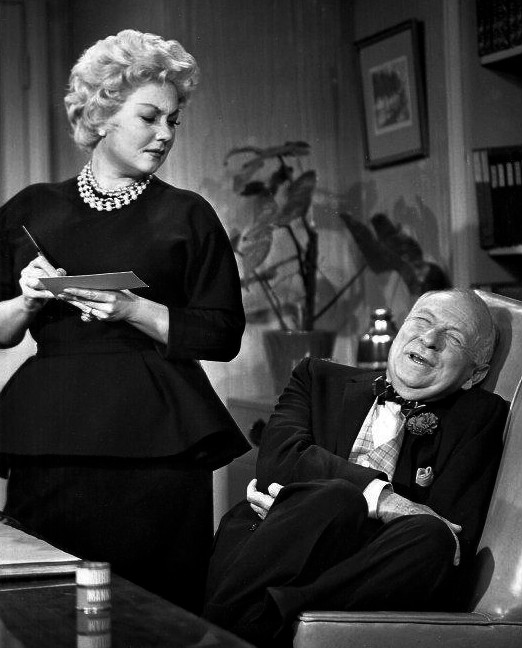
Ann Sothern and Ernest Truex (1958)

- Ernest Truex as Jason McCauley: Katy's first boss, the manager of The Bartley House. McCauley is a timid, elderly man, who is more focused on keeping the guests of The Bartley House satisfied. In episode twenty-four ("Katy's New Boss"), McCauley is transferred to The Bartley House in Calcutta, India.
- Reta Shaw as Flora McCauley: the wife of Mr. McCauley. Flora is a woman of high standards, who is portrayed as an overbearing, domineering wife who frequently bullies her husband. She is a music lover and patron. She accompanies her husband when he is transferred.
- Jack Mullaney as Johnny Wallace: a bellboy at The Bartley House. Johnny is a college student, who is working at the hotel to pay for his classes. He has an unrequited crush on Katy, who usually ignores it. Mullaney was the only one of the first season semi-regulars to appear in season two, though he is written out after the first couple of season two episodes to be replaced by Woody Hamilton.
- Jacques Scott as Paul Monteney: a room clerk at The Bartley House. He is a suave Frenchman. Though he survived the series' retooling midway through the first season, Scott was written out after the end of the first season.

=== Recurring ===
- Jack Wagner as Alfred, a desk clerk at The Bartley House. (seasons 1–2)
- Jesse White as Oscar Pudney, a scheming and dishonest newsstand owner who is the nemesis of Katy and Mr. Devery. White was previously a semi-regular on Private Secretary. (seasons 2–3)
- Jimmy Fields as Richy Gordon, a child prodigy playing the piano, who helps support his widowed mother and three sisters by delivering newspapers. (seasons 2–3)
- Ken Berry as Woody Hamilton, a young bellhop. Berry's role replaced that of Jack Mullaney's character Johnny. (seasons 2–3)
- Louis Nye as Dr. Delbert Gray, a dentist who becomes Olive's boyfriend and eventual husband. (season 3)
- Gladys Hurlbut as Mrs. Gray, Delbert's overbearing mother who dislikes Olive. (season 3)

=== Notable guest stars ===
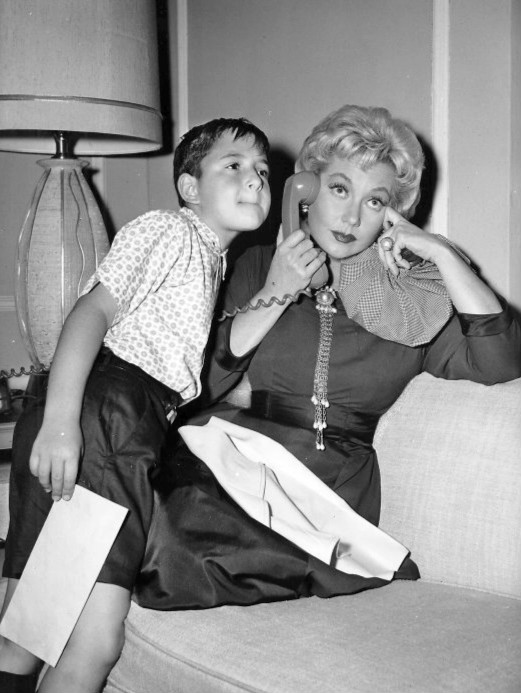
Ann Sothern with guest star Barry Gordon (1958)

Some of the notable guests stars of The Ann Sothern Show included:

- Jack Albertson as Mr. Dooley ("The Witness" and "Billy")
- Lucille Ball as Lucy Ricardo ("The Lucy Story")
- Frances Bavier as Mrs. Wallace ("Johnny Moves Up")
- Constance Bennett as Guinevere Fleming ("Always April")
- Joe E. Brown as Mitchell Carson ("Olive's Dream Man")
- Harry Cheshire as Justice of the Peace ("The Elopment")
- Jackie Coogan as Barney Dunaway ("Surprise, Surprise" and "Wedding March")
- Gladys Cooper as Dutchess ("The Countess of Bartley")
- Jeff Donnell as Helen ("The Girls")
- Kathleen Freeman as Miss Bennett ("A New Lease on Life")
- Eva Gabor as Elsa Kotchka ("The Royal Visit")
- Barry Gordon as Donald ("Governess for a Day" and "The Thanksgiving Show")
- Don Grady as Eddie ("The Thanksgiving Show")
- Joel Grey as Billy Wilton ("Billy")
- Charles Herbert as David Travis ("Slightly Married")
- Marty Ingels as Erskine Wild ("Always April")
- Van Johnson as Terry Tyler, a television writer who does research at The Bartley ("Loving Arms")
- Cecil Kellaway as Sean O'Connor, Katy's dishonest uncle ("Hurrah for the Irish" and "The O'Connors Stick Together")
- Guy Madison ("Katy and the Cowboy")
- Jayne Meadows as Liza Vincent ("Top Executive")
- Sid Melton as Tompkins ("Johnny Moves Up")
- Sal Mineo as Nicky Silvero ("The Sal Mineo Story")
- Howard McNear as Jack Lambert ("A New Lease on Life") and Mr. Bixby ("The Dog Who Came to Dinner" and "A Touch of Larceny")
- Janis Paige as Edith ("The Girls")
- Alice Pearce as Ethel ("Operation Pudney") and Lahona St Cyr ("The Beginning")
- Stefanie Powers as Mary Ann ("Mr. Big Shot")
- Cesar Romero as Bernardo Diaz ("Hasta Luego")
- Olan Soule as Johnson ("Katy's New Boss" and "Katy Goes Through Channels")
- Connie Stevens ("The Bridal Suite")
- Lyle Talbot as Eddie ("Katy's Investment Club")
- Mary Treen as Mary Conway ("One for the Books")
- Lurene Tuttle as Bertha Schyler ("The Widow")
- Estelle Winwood as Mrs. Parker ("One for the Books")

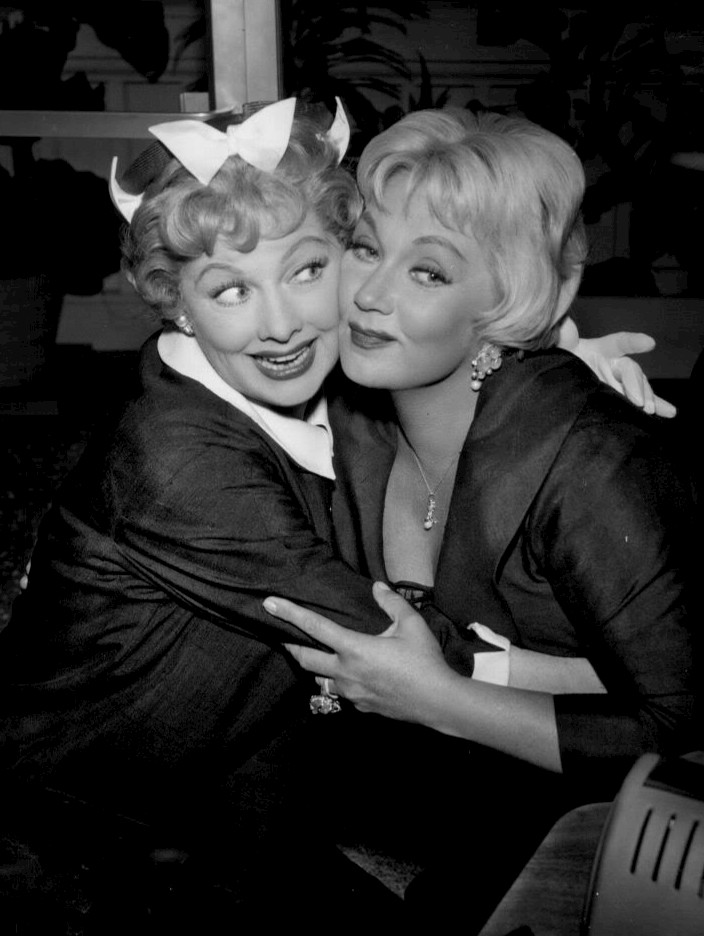
Guest star Lucille Ball with Ann Sothern (1959)

==== Crossover with The Lucy–Desi Comedy Hour ====
The second-season premiere featured a crossover between The Ann Sothern Show and The Lucy–Desi Comedy Hour (then titled The Lucille Ball-Desi Arnaz Show). In the episode "The Lucy Story", Katy is greeted by her old friend Lucy Ricardo (Lucille Ball), who has checked into The Bartley House after an argument with Ricky (Desi Arnaz). Lucy attempts to play matchmaker for Katy and Mr. Devery, but ultimately spreads chaos through her scheme, which backfires on her.

Ball was the only cast member to appear in the episode, with Ricky being mentioned as having gone on vacation with Charlie Snyder; at the time of filming, Arnaz and Ball were on the verge of a divorce. Ball and Sothern had been close friends since the beginning of their careers in the 1930s. In 1957, Sothern had guest starred on the premiere of The Lucy–Desi Comedy Hour ("Lucy Takes a Cruise to Havana") as her Private Secretary character, Susie MacNamara, who was also a friend of Lucy Ricardo.

== Production ==
=== Development ===
A film actress for many years, Sothern moved to television with the CBS sitcom Private Secretary in 1953. During the series' fifth season, Sothern discovered her business manager had embezzled money from her, and she owed back taxes to the Internal Revenue Service as a result. Following the season's end, Sothern discovered Private Secretary producer Jack Chertok had sold the series rights to Metromedia without her permission and sued him. Although CBS had renewed the series for a sixth season, Sothern departed the series due to the lawsuit, which was eventually settled out of court. However, she reprised her character of Susie McNamara on the first episode of The Lucille Ball–Desi Arnaz Show in November 1957, co-starring with her friend Lucille Ball.

Following the success of the special, and wanting more control over her project, Sothern established her own production company Anso Productions, to develop a new series with Desilu Productions, owned by Ball and her husband Desi Arnaz. Ball and Arnaz enlisted their writers, Bob Schiller and Bob Weiskopf, to develop a series for Sothern with producer Arthur Hoffe. Hoffe kept rejecting Schiller and Weiskopf's pitches, before they eventually went to Arnaz directly with the idea to center Sothern as a career woman managing a hotel. The duo also oversaw the first few episodes before returning to the Ball specials. Sothern enlisted her Private Secretary co-star Ann Tyrrell to co-star with her in her new series, and added Ernest Truex in place of Private Secretary co-star Don Porter. After General Foods agreed to sponsor the first season, CBS picked up The Ann Sothern Show in May 1958.

=== Production ===
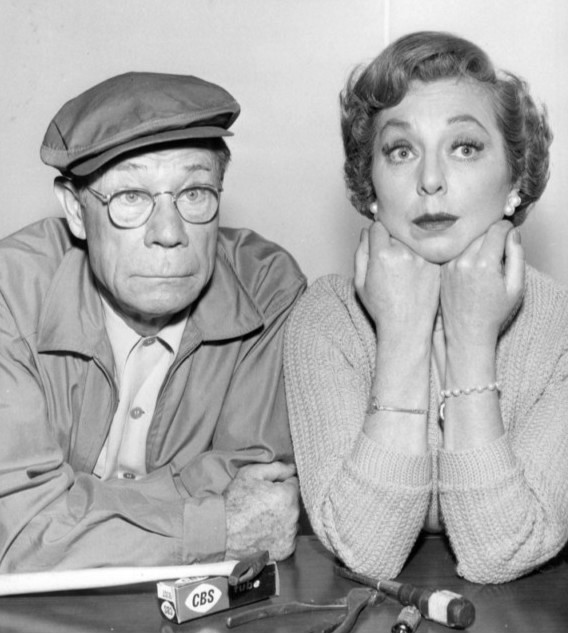
Guest star Joe E. Brown and Ann Tyrrell (1960)

The series was filmed at Desilu Studios though not in front of a live studio audience like most other Desilu sitcoms of the era. Sothern reportedly did not like to perform comedy in front of an audience, and thus, a laugh track was used throughout the show's run. Some episodes featured a disclaimer during the end credits reading "Audience Reaction Technically Produced". Sothern and her sister, Bonnie Lake, wrote the series' theme song "Katy".

The series initially premiered to satisfactory ratings and an earned a Golden Globe Award for Best TV Show. Although Variety described the series as representing "moderate or nervous hits" in February 1959, it was also noted that the series was among the top-rated non-Western series. However, ratings began to decline and Sothern was reportedly dissatisfied that Ernest Truex's character was garnering more attention. On January 27, 1959, United Press International correspondent William Ewald reported in his column that Truex would depart the series. A few weeks later, on February 3, Ewald reported that Don Porter, Sothern's former Private Secretary co-star, would replace Truex. Ratings for the series improved, prompting CBS to renew the series for a second season.

Jack Mullaney and Jacques Scott were also dropped from the cast at the beginning of the second season, and Private Secretary alum Jesse White joined the series in a recurring role towards the end of the season. The second season also did well enough for CBS to renew the series for a third season.

At the beginning of the third season, CBS moved The Ann Sothern Show from its timeslot on Mondays at 9:30 pm EST (immediately following The Danny Thomas Show) to Thursdays at 9:30 pm EST. The move put the series in direct competition with the highly popular top 10 hit The Untouchables, and ratings declined as a result. On February 15, 1961, CBS announced that The Ann Sothern Show had been cancelled.

=== Attempted spin-offs ===
During The Ann Sothern Show's third season, two episodes aired which were intended to be spin-offs. The series would have been produced by Sothern's company Anso Productions, but were not picked up by any network.

The first backdoor pilot, "Always April", aired on February 23, 1961, and starred Constance Bennett, John Emery and Susan Silo. In the episode, Bennett portrayed Guinevere Fleming, a former actress who had retired along with her actor husband David Fleming (Emery) to Vermont. Much to their chagrin, their daughter April (Silo) longs to be an actress and runs away from boarding school to the Bartley House. April meets Katy O'Connor, who convinces her to tell her parents of her plans. The second proposed spin-off episode was "Pandora", which aired on March 16, 1961. The episode featured Pat Carroll as Pandora, a young, slightly eccentric country girl who traveled to Los Angeles on the advice of her mother. Katy O'Connor hires her as a secretary for handsome Hollywood actor Anthony Bardot (Guy Mitchell).

== Episodes ==
=== Series overview ===
Season	Episodes	Originally released		Rank	Rating
Season	Episodes	First released	Last released	Rank	Rating
1	35	October 6, 1958	June 15, 1959	#22	11.87
2	32	October 5, 1959	May 23, 1960	#24	11.07
3	26	October 6, 1960	March 30, 1961	—N/a	—N/a

=== Season 1 (1958–59) ===
No. overall	No. in season	Title	Directed by	Written by	Original release date
1	1	"The Bridal Suite"	Oscar Rudolph	Bob Schiller & Bob Weiskopf	October 6, 1958
2	2	"Six Wives Plus Two"	Sidney Miller	Bob Ross	October 13, 1958
3	3	"Love Comes to Olive"	Paul Harrison	Phil Davis	October 20, 1958
Olive's infatuation on Paul the desk clerk has caused her to act strange, and worries Katy even more. Katy's attempts to help Paul cause Olive to believe that Katy is after him as well. The two friends and roommates to fight.
4	4	"Governess for a Day"	Unknown	Unknown	October 29, 1958
5	5	"The Masquerade Ball"	Sidney Miller	Bob Ross	November 3, 1958
6	6	"A New Lease on Life"	Sidney Miller	Barbara Avedon & Henry Sharp	November 10, 1958
Katy and Olive celebrate "Roommate Day", the anniversary of their moving in together as roommates. However, the dynamics of their friendship are tested when Johnny reveals that he is writing his psychology paper on Katy's more dominant personality over Olive.
7	7	"The Countess of Bartley"	Paul Harrison	Barbara Avedon & Henry Sharp	November 17, 1958
When a dutchess (Gladys Cooper) stays at the hotel, she attaches herself to Katy - to the point that she interrupts her date at the opera. However, she goes too far when she "appoints" Katy to be engaged to her nephew Count Ferdinand (Alan Marshal). Katy is determined to break the engagement - even if it means taking Ferdinand for a night out on the town.
8	8	"The Thanksgiving Show"	Unknown	Unknown	November 24, 1958
9	9	"Say It with Music"	Sidney Miller	Phil Davis	December 1, 1958
10	10	"The Big Gamble"	Paul Harrison	Dick Chevillat & Ray Singer	December 8, 1958
While Mr. McCauley is away to Miami on a business trip, Katy rents out his room to a guest (Sylvia Field) when the hotel is full. However, she finds her choice has threatened the reputation of the hotel when the guest runs illegal gambling games out of the room.
11	11	"It's a Dog Life"	Unknown	Unknown	December 15, 1958
12	12	"The Boss's Son"	Sidney Miller	Mel Diamond & John Kohn	December 22, 1958
When the son of The Bartley House's owner visits, the entire staff is on edge. Katy manages to charm the playboy, but is uninterested. When he decides to settle down and stay around the hotel for awhile, she has to fend off his increasing advances. However, her schemes to get him disinterested backfire – and result in a short-lived engagement to him.
13	13	"East Side Story"	Abby Berlin	Phil Davis	December 29, 1958
14	14	"Johnny Moves Up"	Unknown	Unknown	January 5, 1959
15	15	"Give It Back to the Indians"	Unknown	Unknown	January 12, 1959
16	16	"Three Loves Has Katy"	Sidney Miller	Tom Seller	January 19, 1959
17	17	"Five Year Itch"	Abby Berlin	Mel Diamond & John Kohn	January 26, 1959
18	18	"Hurrah for the Irish"	James V. Kern	Phil Davis	February 2, 1959
19	19	"The O'Connors Stick Together"	James V. Kern	Phil Davis	February 9, 1959
20	20	"The High Cost of Living"	Unknown	Unknown	February 16, 1959
21	21	"Two on the Aisle"	Unknown	Unknown	February 23, 1959
22	22	"The Stand-In Heiress"	Abby Berlin	Phil Davis and Prescott Chaplin	March 2, 1959
23	23	"Katy's Big Surprise"	Unknown	Unknown	March 9, 1959
24	24	"Katy's New Boss"	Abby Berlin	Unknown	March 16, 1959
25	25	"The Road to Health"	Unknown	Unknown	March 23, 1959
26	26	"The Engagement Ring"	Abby Berlin	Phil Davis	March 30, 1959
27	27	"Katy's Investment Club"	Abby Berlin	Mel Diamond & John Kohn	April 13, 1959
28	28	"The Square Peg"	James V. Kern	Phil Davis	April 20, 1959
When Mr. Devery orders all employees to take an "aptitude test" to determine they are fit for employment at the Bartley House, the employees go into a panic. However, Katy is forced to fire a Hungarian waiter who is popular among the employees and guests. When she discovers Mr. Devery himself failed the test, Katy battles against him to reinstate the waiter — and for himself to stay at the Bartley.
29	29	"Geisha Girl"	Abby Berlin	Louella MacFarlane & Arthur Phillips	April 27, 1959
When Katy struggles to juggle her regular duties on top of Mr. Devery's meaningless chores, she decides to find him a servant. However, the only one qualified enough to do it (i.e. in the pay range) is the cousin of a Japanese flower shop owner, who turns out to the surprise of Katy and Mr. Devery to be a Geisha named Michiko. Katy soon becomes jealous when Mr. Devery begins giving her duties to Michiko, and schemes to get Mr. Devery to let go Michiko.
30	30	"The Ugly Bonnet"	Unknown	Phil Davis	May 4, 1959
31	31	"The Raise"	Unknown	Unknown	May 11, 1959
32	32	"Springtime for Katy"	Abby Berlin	Arthur Phillips & Leo Solomon	May 18, 1959
Mad after being called "one of the boys" by Mr. Devery, Katy attempts to make him see her as a woman by being seen with Randy Rand (Patrick O'Neal), an actor with a playboy reputation who is staying at the hotel. But the issue gets out of hand when Randy genuinely does like her, and Olive takes things a little too far, causing Mr. Devery to believe they're getting married.
33	33	"Katy Goes Through Channels"	Unknown	Unknown	June 1, 1959
34	34	"A Promotion for Johnny"	Unknown	Phil Davis	June 8, 1959
35	35	"Baby at the Bartley House"	Unknown	Unknown	June 15, 1959

=== Season 2 (1959–60) ===
No. overall	No. in season	Title	Directed by	Written by	Original release date
36	1	"The Lucy Story"	James V. Kern	Leonard Gershe	October 5, 1959
Katy's old friend Lucy Ricardo (Lucille Ball) checks into The Bartley House after a fight with Ricky, and is appalled to find Katy happy with her life unmarried. Lucy attempts to make Katy jealous by creating an affair with Mr. Devery. After overhearing Katy insult him behind his back, Mr. Devery begins taking the affair seriously, and brings Katy and Lucy to try and out scheme each other.
37	2	"Katy and the Cowboy"	Unknown	Terry Ryan and Robert Van Scoyk	October 12, 1959
38	3	"Katy and Olive's Nervous Break-up"	Unknown	Unknown	October 19, 1959
39	4	"Domestic Katy"	Abby Berlin	Unknown	October 26, 1959
40	5	"The Sal Mineo Story"	Unknown	Unknown	November 2, 1959
41	6	"The Big Pay-Off"	Abby Berlin	Barbara Avedon & Henry Sharp	November 16, 1959
42	7	"Old Buddy Boy"	James V. Kern	Story by : George O'Hanlon; Teleplay by : Bill Manhoff & George O'Hanlon	November 23, 1959
43	8	"Queen for a Night"	Unknown	Unknown	November 30, 1959
44	9	"Katy and the New Girl"	Unknown	Terry Ryan and Robert Van Scoyk	December 7, 1959
45	10	"The Tender Trap"	Unknown	Terry Ryan and Robert Van Scoyk	December 14, 1959
46	11	"Top Executive"	Unknown	Unknown	December 21, 1959
47	12	"Katy Mismanages"	Unknown	Unknown	December 28, 1959
48	13	"The Woman Behind the Throne"	Unknown	Unknown	January 4, 1960
49	14	"Slightly Married"	James V. Kern	Richard De Roy & Danny Simon	January 11, 1960
When a young boy (Charles Herbert) comes to the hotel alone, Katy and Mr. Devery argue whether to report him to the police. Katy learns that he is a Canadian boy who was to meet his American adoptive parents, but they never showed up. While the authorities search for the parents, Katy lies and tells the social worker that she is married so she and Olive can watch him. Things get complicated when both the social worker and Mr. Devery unexpectedly visit.
50	15	"Devery's White Elephant"	Abby Berlin	Unknown	January 18, 1960
51	16	"Katy's New Career"	Unknown	Unknown	January 25, 1960
52	17	"The Witness"	Unknown	Unknown	February 1, 1960
53	18	"The Dog Who Came to Dinner"	Unknown	Unknown	February 8, 1960
54	19	"Olive's Dream Man"	James V. Kern	Barbara Avedon & Henry Sharp	February 15, 1960
55	20	"A Touch of Larceny"	James V. Kern	Bill Manhoff	February 22, 1960
56	21	"Common Cents"	James V. Kern	Unknown	February 29, 1960
57	22	"The Freeloader"	Abby Berlin	Bob Fisher & Alan Lipscott	March 14, 1960
58	23	"Billy"	James V. Kern	Irving Elinson and Fred S. Fox	March 21, 1960
59	24	"I Can Get It for You Wholesale"	Unknown	Unknown	March 28, 1960
60	25	"Katy Meets Danger"	Abby Berlin	George O'Hanlon	April 4, 1960
61	26	"The Roman Hatter"	Abby Berlin	Leonard Gershe & Ashe King	April 11, 1960
62	27	"Surprise, Surprise"	James V. Kern	George O'Hanlon	April 18, 1960
63	28	"One for the Books"	James V. Kern	Arthur Hoffe & Ashe King	April 25, 1960
64	29	"Doubting Devery"	Abby Berlin	Nancy Clark	May 2, 1960
65	30	"Boy Genius"	Unknown	Unknown	May 9, 1960
66	31	"Wedding March"	Unknown	Unknown	May 16, 1960
67	32	"Angels"	James V. Kern	Nancy Clark	May 23, 1960

=== Season 3 (1960–61) ===
No. overall	No. in season	Title	Directed by	Written by	Original release date
68	1	"A Tooth for a Tooth"	James V. Kern	Leonard Gershe	October 6, 1960
Olive's fear of the dentist has kept her from going to the dentist for years, even when she develops a toothache. Katy forces her to go to Dr. Delbert Gray (Louis Nye), and Olive soon begins a relationship with Gray. However, Katy soon finds herself defending the blossoming romance from Gray's mother, who doesn't want her son leaving her anytime soon.
69	2	"Loving Arms"	James V. Kern	Robert Van Scoyk	October 13, 1960
Mr. Devery is furious about a new television program called Loving Arms, which he believes portrays the hotel business in a bad manner. When Katy lets the show's writer Terry Tyler (Van Johnson) do his research at the Bartley House for a retooled show, it makes Devery so furious, he refuses to speak her. To get Devery to change his mind, Katy attempts to have Devery watch the show — but first, his television set needs to be fixed. Sothern's daughter Tisha Sterling cameos, as does Sothern as herself.
70	3	"The Girls"	Richard Whorf	Bob Fisher & Alan Lipscott	October 20, 1960
71	4	"The Pinch-Hitter"	James V. Kern	R.S. Allen	October 27, 1960
72	5	"Olive in Love"	Unknown	Leonard Gershe and Robert Van Scoyk	November 3, 1960
73	6	"Go-Go Gordon"	Richard Whorf	Robert Van Scoyk and Art Baer & Ben Joelson	November 10, 1960
74	7	"Hasta Luego"	Richard Whorf	Leonard Gershe	November 17, 1960
75	8	"The Proposal"	James V. Kern	Barry E. Blitzer	November 24, 1960
76	9	"Secret Admirer"	Richard Whorf	George O'Hanlon & Robert Van Scoyk	December 1, 1960
77	10	"Option Time"	James V. Kern	Robert Van Scoyk and Nancy Clark	December 8, 1960
78	11	"Setting the Date"	James V. Kern	Leonard Gershe	December 15, 1960
79	12	"The Other Woman"	Unknown	Unknown	December 22, 1960
80	13	"The Elopement"	Richard Whorf	Barry E. Blitzer & Robert Van Scoyk	December 29, 1960
81	14	"Operation Pudney"	Richard Whorf	Bob Barbash	January 5, 1961
82	15	"Mr. Big Shot"	Unknown	Unknown	January 19, 1961
83	16	"Toujour L'amour"	Richard Whorf	Leonard Gershe	January 26, 1961
84	17	"The Royal Visit"	James V. Kern	Bob Fisher & Alan Lipscott	February 2, 1961
A princess (Eva Gabor) stays at the Bartley, immediately enchanting Mr. Devery. When the princess asks that Mr. Devery let her keep her dog despite the "No Dogs Allowed" policy, he is only happy to let her. But Katy is not so happy, since she is the one who has to deal with the other guests, who are upset since they don't get special privileges.
85	18	"Just Friends"	Unknown	Robert Van Scoyk, Arthur Phillips, and Ashe King	February 9, 1961
86	19	"The Widow"	James V. Kern	Bob Barbash	February 16, 1961
87	20	"Always April"	Richard Whorf	Robert Van Scoyk	February 23, 1961
A young girl named April runs away from her fancy boarding school, and comes to the Bartley to pursue her dreams of becoming a Broadway actress like her mother (Constance Bennett). And unfortunately, Katy and Mr. Devery are the ones left dealing with girl's parents, former actors who retired to a Vermont farm years ago — and don't want their daughter anywhere near show business.
88	21	"Two's Company"	Richard Whorf	Story by : Danny Simon and Jack Roche; Teleplay by : Danny Simon	March 2, 1961
89	22	"Vamp 'Til Ready"	James V. Kern	R.S. Allen	March 9, 1961
90	23	"Pandora"	Richard Whorf	Benedict Freeman & John Fenton Murray	March 16, 1961
91	24	"The Wedding"	Richard Whorf	Leonard Gershe & Robert Van Scoyk	March 23, 1961
92	25	"The Beginning"	Richard Whorf	Robert Van Scoyk	March 30, 1961
After Olive and Delbert return from their honeymoon with happy stories and photos, the pair try to pair a stubborn Katy with Mr. Devery. However, the couple's separate meddling leads to a misunderstanding that causes Katy to believe Mr. Devery plans to replace her, and she quits to leave and "find herself in Rio de Janeiro". Mr. Devery catches her on her flight and confesses his love for her, which she returns by kissing him.
93	26	"The Invitation"	Richard Whorf	Unknown	September 4, 1961

== Awards and nominations ==
Year	Award	Category	Recipient	Result
1959	Emmy Award	Best Actress in a Leading Role (Continuing Character) in a Comedy Series	Ann Sothern	Nominated
1959	Golden Globe Award	Best TV Show	The Ann Sothern Show	Won

== Legacy ==
While Sothern was known for bringing strong women to screen with Maisie Ravier and Private Secretary, the character of Katy O'Connor was an unusual character in her time. Unlike Susie McNamara in Private Secretary, and other working women of the era, O'Connor held a position of authority in a mostly male-dominated profession. She also was the supervisor of many male staff members. Her position allowed the series to explore the issues women faced in the work force. As such, Katy O'Connor can be seen as a precursor to other working women, such as Mary Richards of The Mary Tyler Moore Show.

=== Sponsors and syndication ===
During its run, The Ann Sothern Show was also sponsored by General Foods Corporation (Tang, Maxwell House coffee), Johnson Wax (Glo-Coat and Pledge), and Post Cereals. Sothern and her cast mates would often appear in commercials for the sponsors' products at the end of the episode. Sothern would then sign off with, "Well, goodnight everybody. Stay happy!".

The series was previously distributed by Desilu Productions, United Artists Television, and Paramount Television. In a unique situation, Sothern kept the rights to The Ann Sothern Show, even after Desilu was sold to Paramount. In 1980, Sothern and Paramount sold The Ann Sothern Show to Metromedia Producers Corporation.
20th Television currently holds the rights to the series.

Cable channel Nick at Nite aired The Ann Sothern Show from 1987 to 1990.

== Notes ==
1.Ernest Truex is a main cast member for the first twenty-three episodes. Don Porter joined the cast in the twenty-fourth episode of the first season ("Katy's New Boss").
2."The Invitation" remained unaired in the series run, but premiered in syndication in 1961.
