= Sabrina Scharf =

American actress, environmental activist, attorney

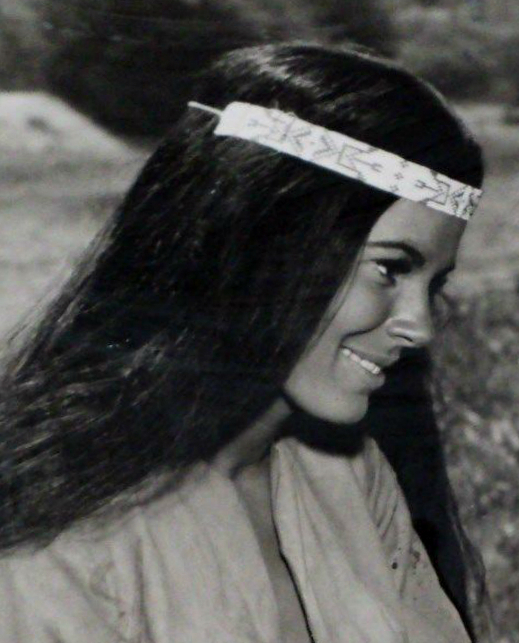
- Scharf in "The Paradise Syndrome", 1968
- Born: Sandra Mae Trentman; Delphos, Ohio, U.S.
- Occupations: Actress, lawyer, real estate developer, activist, politician
- Years active: 1965–1975
- Known for: Miramanee in The Paradise Syndrome, Star Trek
- Spouse: Bob Schiller (m. 1968; died 2017)
- Children: 2

Sabrina Scharf Schiller is an American actress, lawyer, real estate developer, and activist best known for her roles on American television shows.

== Biography ==
Born in Delphos, Ohio, she moved with her mother to Arizona, eventually living in Tucson. She eloped with her algebra teacher at age 14 or 15, but the marriage was annulled three years later. She later worked as a theatrical assistant in New York, then became a Playboy Bunny beginning in 1962. She appeared in the movie Easy Rider and guest-starred in the third-season episode of the original Star Trek, "The Paradise Syndrome".

After Scharf quit acting in the 1970s, she became an anti-pollution activist and unsuccessfully ran for the California State Senate in 1976. She was married to television writer Bob Schiller from 1968 until his death in 2017 and had two children with him.

Scharf became an attorney in 1989 and practiced real estate law in the Los Angeles Pacific Palisades neighborhood until 2017.

== Filmography ==
=== Films ===
Year	Title	Role	Notes
1966	Dead Heat on a Merry-Go-Round	Girl in Bed with Eli	Uncredited
1967	Hells Angels on Wheels	Shill	
1967	Waterhole No. 3	Dove	Uncredited
1969	Easy Rider	Sarah	
1969	The Virgin President	President's girlfriend	
1973	Hunter	Anne Novak	TV movie

=== Television ===
Year	Title	Role	Notes
1965	Gidget	Penelope Peterson	1 episode
1966	The Man from U.N.C.L.E.	Mari Brooks	1 episode
1966	The Girl from U.N.C.L.E.	Greta Wolfe	1 episode
1966	Daniel Boone	Alkini Matthews	1 episode
1967	Captain Nice	Miss Schneider	1 episode
1968	The Wild Wild West	China Hazard	1 episode
1968	Star Trek	Miramanee	1 episode
1968	I Dream of Jeannie	Valerie Thomas	1 episode
1969	Gunsmoke	Lora	1 episode
1969	The Courtship of Eddie's Father	Diane Kirby	1 episode
1968-1969	Mannix	Celia James / Maureen McGill	2 episodes
1968-1970	Hogan's Heroes	Luisa / Inge Wagner	2 episodes
1970	The Interns	Penny Weems	1 episode
1969-1971	Hawaii Five-O	Nicole Fleming / Victoria Lochner	3 episodes
1973	Banacek	Wyn Reever	1 episode
1973	The New Perry Mason	Sheila Osborne	1 episode
1975	The Streets of San Francisco	Mianna	1 episode
1975	Harry O	Jenny / Kathy	2 episodes
