= Snake Pit bar raid =

Former Argentinian student

- Date: March 8, 1970
- Location: Greenwich Village, New York City

The Snake Pit bar raid took place in the pre-dawn hours of 8 March 1970. New York City Police raided the bar at 213 West 10th Street in Greenwich Village under claims that the bar had been operating illegally after hours. One hundred sixty-seven people were taken into custody in the raid.

== Background ==
Despite the protests after the police raid at the Stonewall Inn in Greenwich village had taken place nine months prior, actions by the New York Police Department against gay bars continued for months and years afterward. Because of this, the police raid conducted at the Snake Pit the following March was not unusual.

== Raid ==
In the pre-dawn hours of 8 March 1970, New York City Police raided the Snake Pit at 213 West 10th Street in Greenwich Village. Police said that the Snake Pit had been operating illegally after hours. One hundred sixty-seven people were taken into custody in the raid.

=== Diego Viñales ===
Diego Viñales (born Alfredo Diego Viñales in 1947 or 1948) was an Argentine man arrested during the raid. Viñales was in the United States on an expired student visa and feared deportation.

During the arrests at the bar, Viñales was one of the patrons held the longest inside, before being transferred to a police wagon. A friend noticed he was extremely frightened. Police at the bar were verbally abusive to employees asking about their rights. At the police station, police explained that ID would not be checked, and those present would not have to post bail, but Viñales didn't hear or didn't understand. He ran up a flight of stairs and attempted to escape through a second-floor window to the roof of an adjoining building. He fell and was impaled on the spikes of an iron fence below. With the seriousness of the injury, the police could not simply remove him from the fence. Instead, the fire department was called, and a section of fence was cut out, Viñales was taken to St. Vincent's Hospital in critical condition, still attached to the fence. Surgeons operated on him, with fire department personnel asked to scrub in and assist.

== Reactions ==
By that evening, 200 people had gathered in Sheridan Square to demonstrate against police repression of gays in Greenwich Village. Made up of members of the Gay Activists Alliance, a splinter group of the Gay Liberation Front, and of feminist organizations, they protested the arrest of the bar patrons. They headed towards the hospital, where they conducted a "death vigil". By late evening, the protesters had left the hospital area and were marching peaceably through the West Village.

The intense interest by news media in New York City in the Snake Pit raid and Viñales' injuries was the most of any event relating to homosexual issues since the raid on the Stonewall Inn and was a consequence of the increased activism of the gay community in New York following Stonewall. The Daily News, a tabloid and New York's top-selling daily newspaper, published a front-page photo the next day of Viñales with the caption "Spiked on Iron Fence".

== Legacy ==
The gay community had already seen a surge in organizing activity following the events at the Stonewall Inn the previous summer. The protest march following the Snake Pit raid played a role in galvanizing interest even further among the community in time for the upcoming Christopher Street Liberation Day events already planned for 28 June. This event, scheduled to commemorate the first anniversary of the Stonewall riots was the first Pride march celebration in the United States.

There were political repercussions as well. Democratic Congressman Ed Koch, the future mayor of New York City, accused New York City Police Commissioner Howard R. Leary of approving raids and arrests against the gay community.

== See also ==
- LGBTQ culture in New York City
- List of incidents of civil unrest in New York City
- List of pre-Stonewall LGBT actions in the United States
- List of incidents of civil unrest in the United States
- Timeline of LGBT history
- Zap (action)
