= Edward Winter (actor) =

American actor (1937-2001)

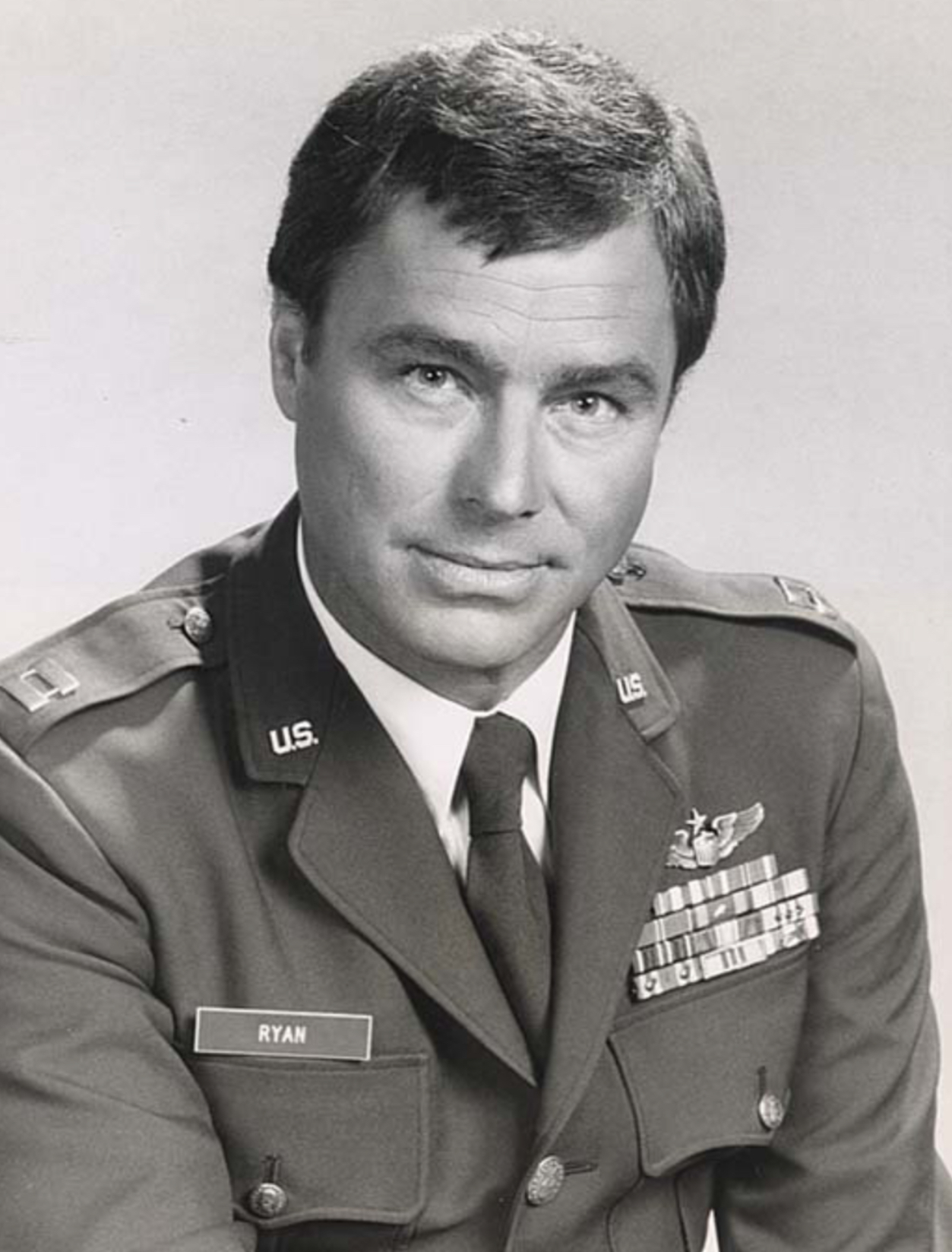
- Winter in Project U.F.O., 1978
- Born: June 3, 1937; Ventura, California, U.S.
- Died: March 8, 2001 (aged 63); Woodland Hills, California, U.S.
- Other name: Ed Winter
- Occupation: Actor
- Years active: 1962–2000
- Spouses: Ronda Faye Moe (m. 1956; div. 1962) Sandra L. Ward (m. 1963; div. 1980) Linda Foster (m. 1980)
- Children: 2 (with Ward)

Edward Dean Winter (June 3, 1937 – March 8, 2001) was an American actor. He is best known for his recurring role, Colonel Samuel Flagg, in the television series M*A*S*H from 1973 to 1979.

His other notable television roles were as U.S. Air Force investigator Capt. Ben Ryan in season 2 of Project U.F.O. (1978–1979); and in Hollywood Beat (1985), 9 to 5 (1986–1988), and Herman's Head (1991–1994).

Winter received two Tony Awards for Best Featured Actor in a Musical nominations for his performances in the original productions of Cabaret (1966) and Promises, Promises (1968). He also appeared in films such as A Change of Seasons (1980), Porky's II: The Next Day (1983) and The Buddy System (1984).

== Early career ==
Winter was born in Ventura, California and began his acting career in Ashland, Oregon as a member of the cast of the Oregon Shakespeare Festival. During the 1961 season, he played Claudius in Hamlet and stayed for an extended repertory season where he appeared in The Boyfriend and Rashomon. He went on to early successes on Broadway. Winter was twice nominated for Tony Awards as Best Supporting or Featured Actor (Musical). The first was in 1967, as Ernst Ludwig in Cabaret, then in 1969 as J.D. Sheldrake in Promises, Promises. He moved on to television, appearing on the daytime serials The Secret Storm and Somerset.

== Later career ==
Winter was cast on M*A*S*H as Lt. Col. (later Col.) Flagg, becoming one of the program's more memorable and popular recurring characters. He appeared in seven episodes as Flagg during the show's 11-year run. The Flagg character was an intelligence agent (claiming to be C.I.A. several times) who brought a stereotypically paranoid, conspiracy-driven approach to his tasks. In some episodes his character was particularly vicious. Before his introduction as Flagg, Winter had appeared in the Season 2 episode "Deal Me Out" as Cpt. Halloran. A number of fans have expressed the belief that Halloran might have been one of Flagg's many aliases, especially as he said to Dr. Freedman, "we played poker once," which Cpt. Halloran had. However, this is debatable, as Halloran was a reasonably amiable character, whilst every other persona Flagg adopted was highly antagonistic, regardless of the alias. Winter reprised the role of Col. Flagg in an episode of the spin-off series AfterMASH in 1984. In 1985 he appeared in the pilot episode of Misfits of Science as an army officer who is killed trying to stop an insane general, played by Larry Linville.

In 1974, he played a pedophile in the Marcus Welby, M.D. episode "The Outrage". The same year, he appeared in the films The Parallax View and The Disappearance of Flight 412. In 1976, he appeared in the crime comedy Special Delivery. In 1975, he played Wes Greenfield in The Bob Newhart Show as an aspiring insurance company Executive. (Season 3, Episode 6 - The Gray Flannel Shrink). In 1976, he appeared in a season two episode of Phyllis, playing a boyfriend of Phyllis who comes out as gay. He also appeared in two memorable episodes of Dallas in 1981 as plastic surgeon Dr. Frank Waring, Mitch Cooper's mentor. Winter also appeared in the TV show Alice, Season 2 Episode 7. He played Alice's possible boyfriend, Jack. Winter was a recurring character in the first season of the prime time sitcom Soap in 1977–78, portraying Congressman Walter McCallum, who was having an affair with the Tates' daughter, Eunice. In 1977, Winter appeared in an episode of Lou Grant titled "Housewarming," as a reporter who beat his wife. The same year, he appeared in the popular TV movie The Gathering, also starring Ed Asner, and "Never Con a Killer," the pilot for the crime drama The Feather and Father Gang. In 1976, he appeared in The Mary Tyler Moore Show, in which he played a congressman with a former tie to organized crime. He guest-starred in season one on The A-Team in the episode "Holiday in the Hills" and appeared in the season 5 episode "Road Games".

Winter starred in the 1979 NBC primetime drama Project UFO and was featured in the 1980 film A Change of Seasons. In 1979, Winter played the role of NASA astronaut Commander Buck Fulton in the 2-part episode of Salvage 1 titled "Golden Orbit." He appeared as the corrupt county commissioner Bob Gebhardt in the 1983 movie Porky's II: The Next Day, the romantic comedy The Buddy System (1984), and in From the Hip (1987), also directed by Porky's director Bob Clark. In 1980 he played Clark Gable in the TV movie The Scarlett O'Hara War. Winter co-starred in the 1986 TV movie A Christmas Gift as Thomas Renfield, with co-star John Denver. Three years later he portrayed Las Vegas entertainer Johnny Roman in Mike Hammer: Murder Takes All. He appeared as murder victim Charlton 'Charlie' Chambers (as Ed Winter) in a 1990 episode of Columbo, "Rest in Peace, Mrs. Columbo". Winter had a recurring role on the Fox sitcom Herman's Head from 1991 to 1994. Winter portrayed Mr. Crawford, an executive at Waterton Publishing. He was featured as the real-life character of Carl Lawson in a 1995 episode of UPN's Real Ghosts, also known as Haunted Lives: True Ghost Stories. He did voice work on such programs as The Real Adventures of Jonny Quest, Duckman, Aaahh!!! Real Monsters, The Angry Beavers, Fantastic Max, Paddington Bear and the animated film Adventures in Odyssey: Shadow of a Doubt.

== Death ==
On March 8, 2001, Winter died at age 63 in Woodland Hills, California, of complications from Parkinson's disease.

== Filmography ==
- The Boston Strangler (1968) as Man in Hallway (uncredited)
- Big Daddy (1973, TV movie)
- M*A*S*H (1973–1979, TV Series) as Col. Samuel Flagg / Capt. Halloran
- The Magician (1974, TV Series) as Ted Winters
- The Bob Newhart Show (1974) as Wes Greenfield
- The Parallax View (1974) as Senator Jameson
- The Disappearance of Flight 412 (1974, TV movie) as Mr. Cheer
- Special Delivery (1976) as Larry Pierce
- The Invasion of Johnson County (1976, TV movie) as Major Edward Fershay
- The Mary Tyler Moore Show (1976, TV Series) as Brian Nordquist (senatorial candidate)
- Never Con a Killer (1977, TV movie) as Deputy DA J.C. Hadley
- The Girl in the Empty Grave (1977, TV movie) as Dr Peter Cabe
- Maude (1977, TV episode, The Ecologist) as Perry Flannery
- The Gathering (1977, TV movie) as Roger
- Soap (1977–1978, TV Series) as Congressman Walter McCallum
- Woman on the Run (1977, TV movie) as Daniel Frazier
- Rendezvous Hotel (1979, TV movie) as Jim Becker
- Lou Grant (1979, Episode 'Cop')
- Mother and Daughter: The Loving War (1980, TV movie) as Doug
- The Scarlett O'Hara War (1980, TV movie) as Clark Gable
- A Change of Seasons (1980) as Steven Rutledge
- The Big Black Pill (1981, TV movie) as Jerrold Farinpour
- Lou Grant (1981, Episode 'Business')
- Fly Away Home (1981, TV movie) as Lieutenant Colonel Pace
- Dallas (1981) as Dr. Frank Waring
- Family in Blue (1982, TV movie)
- The First Time (1982, TV movie) as Captain Michael McKenzie
- Wait Until Dark (1982, TV movie) as Sam Hendrix
- The 25th Man (1982, TV movie) as Captain Mike Houston
- Porky's II: The Next Day (1983) as Commissioner Bob Gebhardt
- The A-Team (1983–1985, TV Series) as Racketeer Johnny Royce / Reporter Mitchell Barnes
- The Buddy System (1983) as Jim Parks
- The Last Honor of Kathryn Beck (1984, TV movie) as Carl Macaluso
- Cagney & Lacey (1985, TV Series) as Capt. Jack Hennessey in Rules of the Game and Con Games
- Perry Mason: The Case of the Notorious Nun (1986, TV movie) as Jonathan Eastman
- Stranded (1986, TV movie) as Tommy Claybourne
- There Must Be a Pony (1986, TV movie) as David Hollis
- The Christmas Gift (1986, TV movie) as Thomas A. Renfield
- Mathnet (1987, TV segment from Square One Television) as Clarence Sampson in The Problem of the Missing Baseball (pilot episode, filmed 1985)
- From the Hip (1987) as Raymond Torkenson
- The Golden Girls (1989, TV Series) as John Quinn
- Murder, She Wrote (1989, TV Series) as Capt. Everett Larson in Smooth Operators
- Mike Hammer: Murder Takes All (1989, TV movie) as Johnny Roman
- Columbo: Rest in Peace, Mrs. Columbo (1990, TV movie) as Charlie Chambers
- Held Hostage: The Sis and Jerry Levin Story (1991, TV movie) as Bill Prentiss
- The American Clock (1993, TV movie) as William Durant
- Saved by the Bell: The College Years (1993, TV Series) as Mr. Burke
- Seinfeld Season 6, Episode 16, "The Beard" (1995) as Mr. Stevenson
