= Zap (action) =

1970s protest acts by US LGBT groups

Sheriff's deputies face off against demonstrators at the Barney's Beanery zap, February 7, 1970

A zap is a form of political direct action that came into use in the 1970s in the United States. Popularized by the early gay liberation group Gay Activists Alliance, a zap was a raucous public demonstration designed to embarrass a public figure or celebrity while calling the attention of both gays and straights to issues of gay rights.

Although American homophile organizations had engaged in public demonstrations as early as 1959, these demonstrations tended to be peaceful picket lines. Following the 1969 Stonewall riots, considered the flashpoint of the modern gay liberation movement, younger, more radical gay activists were less interested in the staid tactics of the previous generation. Zaps targeted politicians and other public figures and many addressed the portrayal of gay people in the popular media. LGBT and AIDS activist groups continued to use zap-like tactics into the 1990s and beyond.

== Pre-Stonewall actions ==
Beginning in 1959, and continuing for the next ten years, gay people occasionally demonstrated against discriminatory attitudes toward and treatment of homosexuals. Although these sometimes took the form of sit-ins, and on at least two occasions riots, for the most part these were picket lines. Many of these pickets were organized by Eastern affiliates of such groups as the Mattachine Society chapters out of New York City and Washington, D.C., Philadelphia's Janus Society and the New York chapter of Daughters of Bilitis, These groups acted under the collective name East Coast Homophile Organizations (ECHO). Organized pickets tended to be in large urban population centers because these centers were where the largest concentration of homophile activists were located. Picketers at ECHO-organized events were required to follow strict dress codes. Men had to wear ties, preferably with a jacket. Women were required to wear skirts. The dress code was imposed by Mattachine Society Washington founder Frank Kameny, with the goal of portraying homosexuals as "presentable and 'employable'".

== Post-Stonewall activism ==
On June 28, 1969, the patrons of the Stonewall Inn, a gay bar located in New York City's Greenwich Village, resisted a police raid. Gay people returned to the Stonewall and the surrounding neighborhood for the next several nights for additional confrontations. Although there had been two smaller riots — in Los Angeles in 1959 and San Francisco in 1966 — it is the Stonewall riots that have come to be seen as the flashpoint of a new gay liberation movement.

In the weeks and months following Stonewall, a dramatic increase in gay political organizing took place. Among the many groups that formed was the Gay Activists Alliance, which focused more exclusively on organizing around gay issues and less of the general leftist political perspective taken by such other new groups as the Gay Liberation Front and Red Butterfly. GAA member Marty Robinson is credited with developing the zap following a March 7, 1970, police raid on a gay bar called the Snake Pit. Police arrested 167 patrons. One, an Argentine national named Diego Viñales, so feared the possibility of deportation that he leapt from a second-story window of the police station, impaling himself on the spikes of an iron fence. GAA founding member Arthur Evans later recalled how the raid and Viñales' critical injuries inspired the technique:

The Snake Pit incident truly outraged us, and we put out a leaflet saying that, in effect, regardless of how you looked at it, Diego Viñales was pushed out the window and we were determined to stop it....There was no division for us between the political and personal. We were never given the option to make that division. We lived it. So we decided that people on the other side of the power structure were going to have the same thing happen to them. The wall that they had built protecting themselves from the personal consequences of their political decisions was going to be torn down and politics was going to become personal for them.

Zaps typically included sudden onset against vulnerable targets, noisiness, verbal assaults and media attention. Tactics included sit-ins, disruptive actions and street confrontations.

Arthur Evans explained the philosophy of the zap, which he described as "political theater for educating the gay masses":

Gays who have as yet no sense of gay pride see a zap on television or read about it in the press. First they are vaguely disturbed at the demonstrators for "rocking the boat"; eventually, when they see how the straight establishment responds, they feel anger. This anger gradually focuses on the heterosexual oppressors, and the gays develop a sense of class-consciousness. And the no-longer-closeted gays realize that assimilation into the heterosexual mainstream is no answer: gays must unite among themselves, organize their common resources for collective action, and resist.

Thus, obtaining media coverage of the zap became more important than the subject of the zap itself. It was precisely this anti-assimilationist attitude that led some mainstream gay people and groups to oppose zapping as a strategy. The National Gay Task Force's media director, Ronald Gold, despite having been involved in early GAA zaps, came to urge GAA not to engage in the tactic. As zaps and other activism began opening doors for nascent gay organizations like NGTF and the Gay Media Task Force, these groups became more invested in negotiating with the people within the mainstream power structures rather than in maintaining a tactic they saw as being of the outsider.

== Notable zaps ==
One area of special interest to GAA was how LGBT people were portrayed on television and on film. There were very few gay characters on television in the 1960s and early 1970s, and many of them were negative. Several in particular, including episodes of Marcus Welby, M.D. in 1973 and 1974 and a 1974 episode of Police Woman, were deemed especially egregious, with their presentation of homosexuality as a mental illness, gays as child molesters and lesbians as psychotic killers echoing similar portrayals that continued a trend that dated back to before 1961.

In response to the 1973 Welby episode, "The Other Martin Loring", a GAA representative tried to negotiate with ABC, but when negotiations failed GAA zapped ABC's New York headquarters on February 16, 1973, picketing ABC's New York City headquarters and sending 30-40 members to occupy the office of ABC president Leonard Goldenson. Executives offered to meet with two GAA representatives but GAA insisted that all protesters be present. The network refused. All but six of the zappers then left; the final six were arrested but charges were later dropped.

When NBC aired "Flowers of Evil", an episode of Police Woman about a trio of lesbians murdering nursing home residents for their money, it was met with a zap by Lesbian Feminist Liberation. LFL, which had split from GAA over questions of lack of male attention to women's issues, zapped NBC's New York office on November 19, occupying the office of vice president Herminio Traviesas overnight. NBC agreed not to rerun the episode. LFL had earlier zapped an episode of The Dick Cavett Show on which anti-feminist author George Gilder was the guest.

Zaps could sometimes involve physical altercations and vandalism. GAA co-founder Morty Manford got into scuffles with security and administration during his successful effort to found the student club Gay People at Columbia University in 1971, as well as at a famous protest against homophobia at the elite Inner Circle event in 1972 (which led Morty's mother Jeanne Manford to found PFLAG). GAA was later associated with a series of combative "super-zaps" against homophobic politicians and anti-gay business owners in the summer of 1977. On one occasion activists threw eggs and firecrackers at the home of Adam Walinsky, a state official who had denounced new gay rights legislation for New York, and cut the phone lines of his house. Although Time magazine derided them as "Gay goons", and Walinsky won an injunction against protests near his home, the actions succeeded in keeping the conservative backlash of the late-1970s out of New York state.

Activist Mark Segal was a very active zapper, usually acting alone, sometimes with a compatriot operating under the name "Gay Raiders". His guerilla zaps frequently drew national news coverage, sometimes from the target of the zaps themselves. Some of his more successful zaps include: chaining himself to a railing at a taping of The Tonight Show Starring Johnny Carson in early March 1973; handcuffing himself and a friend to a camera at a 7 May 1973 taping of The Mike Douglas Show after producers cancelled a planned discussion of gay issues; disrupting a live broadcast of The Today Show on 26 October 1973 (resulting in an off-camera interview with Barbara Walters, who explained the reason for the zap); and interrupting Walter Cronkite during a live newscast of the CBS Evening News on 11 December 1973 by rushing the set with a sign reading Gays Protest CBS Prejudice (after a brief interruption, Cronkite reported the zap).

Politicians and other public figures were also the targets of zaps. New York Mayor John Lindsay was an early and frequent GAA target, with GAA insisting that Lindsay take a public stance on gay rights issues. Lindsay, elected as a liberal Republican, preferred quiet coalition building and also feared that publicly endorsing gay rights would damage his chances at the Presidency; he refused to speak publicly in favor of gay rights and refused to meet with GAA to discuss passing a citywide anti-discrimination ordinance. The group's first zap, on April 13, 1970, involved infiltrating opening night of the 1970 Metropolitan Opera season, shouting gay slogans when the mayor and his wife made their entrance. Lindsay was zapped again on April 19 as he taped an episode of his weekly television program, With Mayor Lindsay. Approximately 40 GAA members obtained tickets to the taping. Some GAA members rushed the stage calling for the mayor to endorse gay rights; others called out comments from the audience, booed, stomped their feet and otherwise disrupted taping. One notable exchange came when the mayor noted it was illegal to blow car horns in New York, drawing the response "It's illegal to blow a lot of things!" When Lindsay announced his candidacy for the Presidency in the 1972 election, GAA saw the opportunity to bring gay issues to national attention and demanded of each potential candidate a pledge to support anti-discrimination. Lindsay was among those who responded favorably.

Zapping migrated to the West Coast as early as 1970, when a coalition of several Los Angeles groups targeted Barney's Beanery. Barney's had long displayed a wooden sign at its bar reading "FAGOTS [sic] – STAY OUT". Although there were few reports of actual anti-gay discrimination at Barney's, activists found the sign's presence galling and refused to patronize the place, even when gay gatherings were held there. On February 7, over 100 people converged on Barney's. They engaged in picketing and leafletting outside and occupied tables for long periods inside with small orders. (Note: This tactic was employed decades later against the Cracker Barrel restaurant chain when it instituted a policy of refusing to employ gay workers. It became known as a "sip-in".) The owner of Barney's not only refused to take down the sign, he put up more signs made of cardboard, harassed the gay customers inside, refused service to them, ordered them out of the restaurant and eventually assaulted a customer and called the sheriff. After several hours and consultation with the sheriff's department, the original wooden sign was taken down and stored out of sight and the new cardboard signs were removed and distributed among the demonstrators. (Note: The original sign was put up and taken down several times over the next 14 years until West Hollywood, newly incorporated as a city, permanently removed the sign under a newly passed LGBT anti-discrimination ordinance in December 1984 (Kenney, p. 50).)

Encouraged by GAA co-founder Arthur Bell, in his capacity as a columnist for The Village Voice, activists employed zaps against William Friedkin and the cast and crew of the 1980 film Cruising. In 1979, Cruising opponents blew whistles, shined lights into camera lenses and otherwise disrupted filming to protest how the gay community and the leather sub-culture in particular were being portrayed.

== Exporting the zap ==
Emerging activist groups in other countries adopted the zap as a tactic. The British GLF zapped the Festival of Light, a morality campaign, in 1971. GLF member Peter Tatchell has continued to engage in zaps in the intervening decades, both singly and in association with such organizations as the British GLF and OutRage!. In Australia, Sydney Gay Liberation perpetrated a series of zaps beginning in 1973, including engaging in public displays of affection, leafletting and sitting in at a pub rumored to be refusing service to gay customers. Gay Activists Alliance in Adelaide zapped a variety of targets, including a gynecologist perceived to be anti-lesbian, a religious conference at Parkin-Wesley College and politicians and public figures such as Steele Hall, Ernie Sigley, John Court and Mary Whitehouse.

== ACT UP and Queer Nation ==
In response to the AIDS epidemic, the direct action group AIDS Coalition To Unleash Power (ACT UP) formed in 1987. ACT UP adopted a zap-like form of direct action reminiscent of the earlier GAA-style zaps. Some of these included: a March 24, 1987 "die-in" on Wall Street, in which 250 people demonstrated against what they saw as price gouging for anti-HIV drugs; the October 1988 attempted shut-down of the Food and Drug Administration headquarters in Rockville, Maryland, to protest perceived foot-dragging in approving new AIDS treatments; and perhaps most notoriously, Stop the Church, a December 12, 1989, demonstration in and around St. Patrick's Cathedral in opposition to the Catholic Church's opposition to condom use to prevent the spread of HIV.

Queer Nation formed in 1990 and adopted the militant tactics of ACT UP and applied them more generally to LGBT issues. Queer Nation members were known for entering social spaces like straight bars and clubs and engaging in straight-identified behaviour like playing spin the bottle to make the point that most public spaces were straight spaces. QN would stage "kiss-ins" in public places like shopping malls or sidewalks, both as a shock tactic directed at heterosexuals and to point out that gay people should be able to engage in the same public behaviours as straight people. Echoing the disruption a decade earlier during the filming of Cruising, Queer Nation and other direct action groups disrupted filming of Basic Instinct over what they believed were negative portrayals of lesbian and bisexual women.

== See also ==
- Charivari
- Egging
- Glitter bombing
- Inking (attack)
- Pieing
- Cancel culture
- Shoe-throwing
- Zelyonka attack

== Sources ==
- Bianco, David (1999). Gay Essentials: Facts For Your Queer Brain. Los Angeles, Alyson Books. ISBN 1-55583-508-2.
- Bronski, Michael (2011). A Queer History of the United States. Boston, Beacon Press. ISBN 978-0-8070-4439-1.
- Campbell, J. Louis (2007). Jack Nichols, Gay Pioneer: "Have You Heard My Message?". Haworth Press. ISBN 1-56023-653-1.
- Capsuto, Steven (2000). Alternate Channels: The Uncensored Story of Gay and Lesbian Images on Radio and Television. Ballantine Books. ISBN 0-345-41243-5.
- Carter, David (2005). Stonewall: The Riots That Sparked the Gay Revolution. Macmillan. ISBN 0-312-34269-1.
- Clendinen, Dudley (1999). Out for good : the struggle to build a gay rights movement in America. Simon & Schuster. ISBN 0-684-81091-3.
- Duberman, Martin (1993). Stonewall. Penguin Books. ISBN 0-525-93602-5.
- Eisenbach, David (2006). Gay Power: An American Revolution. Carroll & Graf Publishers. ISBN 0-7867-1633-9.
- Faderman, Lillian and Stuart Timmons (2006). Gay L.A.: A History of Sexual Outlaws, Power Politics, and Lipstick Lesbians. Basic Books. ISBN 0-465-02288-X.
- Gross, Larry P. (2001). Up from Invisibility: Lesbians, Gay Men, and the Media in America. Columbia University Press. ISBN 0-231-11952-6.
- Kenney, Moira (2001). Mapping Gay L.A.: The Intersection of Place and Politics. Temple University Press. ISBN 1-56639-884-3.
- Loughery, John (1998). The Other Side of Silence – Men's Lives and Gay Identities: A Twentieth-Century History. New York, Henry Holt and Company. ISBN 0-8050-3896-5.
- Miller, Neil (1995). Out of the Past: Gay and Lesbian History from 1869 to the Present. New York, Vintage Books. ISBN 0-09-957691-0.
- Teal, Donn (1971, reissued 1995). The Gay Militants: How Gay Liberation Began in America, 1969–1971. New York, St. Martin's Press. ISBN 0-312-11279-3 (1995 edition).
- Tropiano, Stephen (2002). The Prime Time Closet: A History of Gays and Lesbians on TV. New York, Applause Theatre and Cinema Books. ISBN 1-55783-557-8.
