= The Other Martin Loring =

1973 episode of Marcus Welby, M.D.

- Marcus Welby, M.D. episode
- The other Martin Loring; just lie down and maybe he'll go away.
- Episode no.: Season 4 Episode 22
- Directed by: Allen Reisner
- Written by: Dick Nelson
- Original air date: February 20, 1973

Guest appearances
- Mark Miller; Sharon Acker; Martha Scott; Scott Jacoby

Episode chronology
| ← Previous "The Working Heart" | Next → "The Day After Forever" |

"The Other Martin Loring" is a 1973 episode of Marcus Welby, M.D., an American medical drama that aired on ABC. It tells the story of a middle-aged man facing several health issues, which seem to stem from his repression of his homosexuality. The episode aired on February 20, 1973, and was met with concern and protests from LGBT rights activists for its equating of homosexuality and illness.

== Plot ==
Martin Loring consults with Dr. Welby regarding several health issues. He is an alcoholic, overweight, depressed and diabetic. Martin tells the concerned doctor that he is simply overworked and under stress. That night, his wife Margaret announces she is divorcing him and suing for full custody of their son Billy; she calls him an unfit parent. When he threatens a countersuit, she responds by saying that she will hold nothing back to keep him from getting their son. Later, Martin collapses. Dr. Welby tends to him, then speaks with Margaret, who tells him their marriage is over. Suspecting infidelity, Dr. Welby is surprised when Margaret tells him she wishes that the problem was another woman.

The next day, Margaret serves Martin with divorce papers. After a drink and an insulin shot, Martin has a car accident. He is arrested for drunk driving, but the good doctor convinces the police it was an insulin overdose. Dr. Welby speaks with Martin's mother, and after learning that Martin's father was distant, deduces that Martin is a homosexual. After initially denying it, Martin acknowledges having homosexual tendencies. Dr. Welby suggests that Martin is not really a homosexual, but that instead his fear of being a homosexual is leading to his depression. Martin resists this diagnosis, but after attempting suicide, agrees to see a psychiatrist. Dr. Welby expresses his assurances that Martin will win his "fight" and one day be able to live a "normal" life.

== Cast ==
- Robert Young as Dr. Marcus Welby
- James Brolin as Dr. Steven Kiley
- Elena Verdugo as Consuelo Lopez
- Mark Miller as Martin Loring
- Sharon Acker as Margaret Loring
- Martha Scott as Mrs. Loring, Martin's mother
- Scott Jacoby as Billy Loring

== Controversy and protests ==
Person or persons unknown leaked the script for "The Other Martin Loring" to gay groups sometime around January 1973. In response, the Gay Activists Alliance sent a letter to ABC's Standards and Practices department advising that the script's portrayal of homosexuality was negative; GAA knew that the popularity of the Welby series would mean that any negative message would reach an extremely wide audience. GAA media director Ron Gold and other GAA representatives met with ABC executives on February 13, but when negotiations failed, GAA zapped ABC's New York headquarters on February 16, picketing ABC's New York City headquarters and sending 30-40 members to occupy the New York offices of ABC president Elton Rule and board chairman Leonard Goldenson. As they sat in, GAA members took telephone calls from supportive mental-health professionals. Executives offered to meet with two GAA representatives, but GAA insisted that all protesters be present. The network refused. All but six of the zappers then left; the final six were arrested, but charges were later dropped.

On the day of the broadcast, 25 picketers struck the Los Angeles County Medical Association for two hours, carrying signs with slogans such as MARCUS WELBY, WITCH DOCTOR and trying to brand Welby as a quack. A few picketers went to ABC's Los Angeles headquarters, but ABC refused to meet with them. Calls for a national boycott were made, but ultimately nothing came of them.

== See also ==
- List of 1970s American television episodes with LGBT themes

== Bibliography ==
- Capsuto, Steven (2000). Alternate Channels: The Uncensored Story of Gay and Lesbian Images on Radio and Television. Ballantine Books. ISBN 0-345-41243-5..
- Tropiano, Stephen (2002). The Prime Time Closet: A History of Gays and Lesbians on TV. New York: Applause Theatre and Cinema Books. ISBN 1-55783-557-8..
