= Elton Rule =

American television executive

Elton H. Rule (June 13, 1917-May 5, 1990) was an American television executive and former president of the American Broadcasting Company. Assuming the presidency at a time when ABC was a distant third in the Nielsen ratings, Rule is credited with greatly expanding network revenue, ratings, affiliates and profits. He is also credited with developing the miniseries, beginning with an adaptation of QB VII in 1974 and including the landmark Roots in 1977. Rule served as network president from 1972 to 1983.

Elton Rule died of cancer at his Beverly Hills, California, home in 1990.
