= Bob Weiskopf =

American screenwriter

Bob Weißkopf
- Born: Robert Weiskopf; March 13, 1914; Chicago, Illinois, United States
- Died: February 20, 2001 (aged 86); Los Angeles, California, United States
- Occupations: Television writer, producer
- Years active: 1942–86
- Spouse(s): Eileen Ito (1940–2001; his death)
- Children: 2 sons

Bob Weiskopf (March 13, 1914 – February 20, 2001) was an American screenwriter and producer for television. He has credits for I Love Lucy which he and his writing partner Bob Schiller joined in the fifth season. They also wrote for The Lucy-Desi Comedy Hour, The Lucy Show, Maude, All in the Family (for which he won a 1978 Emmy for co-writing the episode "Cousin Liz"), Archie Bunker's Place, The Red Skelton Show, the short-lived Pete and Gladys, and Sanford (the spin-off of Sanford and Son).

== Life and career ==
Weiskopf, born in Chicago, Illinois, began writing for television in 1950, when he wrote an episode for The Colgate Comedy Hour.

Weiskopf first tried comedy writing at the suggestion of friends Norman Panama and Melvin Frank. Panama and Frank lured him to Hollywood in 1940, where he managed to sell some jokes to Bob Hope for his radio program. From there, he later wrote for radio, for Eddie Cantor's The Eddie Cantor Show, and Rudy Vallée for his Rudy Vallee's Sealtest Program, he would in later years, write comedy material for Fred Allen, Danny Thomas, Red Skelton, Phyllis Diller and Carol Burnett.

After the attack on Pearl Harbor on December 7, 1941, he sent his new bride, the former Eileen Ito, east to avoid the internment camps, and moved in with fellow Rudy Vallee writer Jess Oppenheimer (who 13 years later would hire his former roommate to write for I Love Lucy). Weiskopf and his wife Eileen were reunited a few months later when he moved to New York City, where he was hired to write radio comedy for the comedian-actor Fred Allen. When Weiskopf received a draft notice ordering him to report on June 1, 1942, he requested a two-week delay so that he could finish writing the last two Fred Allen shows of the season. The Draft Board summarily rejected his request, explaining, "Everybody knows Fred Allen writes his own material."

=== Creative partnership with Bob Schiller ===
The creative partnership and friendship with Bob Schiller began in 1953, when Weiskopf — who was also a comedy writer — had just relocated to Los Angeles from New York City, and his wife began searching for a school for their youngest son Kim, to attend; Schiller's first wife had recommended a school for Kim to Weiskopf's wife, and also told her that Schiller was looking for a partner. The two collaborated for the first time in writing a single radio script for the Our Miss Brooks show, before delving into the new media of network television together, writing for such popular 1950s shows such as Make Room for Daddy, which starred Danny Thomas, The Bob Cummings Show, I Love Lucy, the TV adaptation of the popular radio series My Favorite Husband, The Lucy-Desi Comedy Hour, and The Ann Sothern Show, which they co-created.

Further success continued into the 1960s and 1970s with such series as New Comedy Showcase, Pete and Gladys, The Lucy Show, The Red Skelton Show, The Good Guys (for which they were also co-producers), The Phyllis Diller Show, The Carol Burnett Show, The Flip Wilson Show, Maude (which they also co-produced), and All in the Family and its spinoff series Archie Bunker's Place. During their long collaboration, the writing team of Schiller and Weiskopf were honored with two Emmy Awards, a pair of Peabody Awards, a Golden Globe, and the Writers’ Guild of America's Paddy Chayefsky Laurel Award for Television Achievement.

Weiskopf's son Kim Weiskopf was also a television writer. His other son, Walt, was not.

== Death ==
Weiskopf died in Los Angeles on February 20, 2001; he was survived by his wife, sons Kim and Walt and their grandchildren. His son Kim Weiskopf, who followed his father into the world of television comedy writing, died of pancreatic cancer at the age of 62 at his home in Encino, California.
