= Bob Schiller =

American screenwriter

- Born: Robert Achille Schiller; November 8, 1918; San Francisco, California, U.S.
- Died: October 10, 2017 (aged 98); Pacific Palisades, Los Angeles, California, U.S.
- Occupation: Television writer
- Years active: 1950–2005
- Spouses: Joyce Harris (m. 1947; died 1965) Sabrina Scharf (m. 1968)
- Children: 4 (2 with each wife)
- Relatives: Tom Schiller

Robert Achille Schiller (November 8, 1918 – October 10, 2017) was an American screenwriter. He worked extensively with fellow producer/screenwriter Bob Weiskopf on numerous television shows in the United States, including I Love Lucy (1955–1957) and All in the Family (1977–1979) on the CBS network. For the latter series, he received an Emmy Award in 1978 as one of the writers of the episode "Cousin Liz."

His second wife was American politician, actress and attorney Sabrina Scharf.

== Life and career ==
Schiller was born in San Francisco, California, the son of Lucille E. (Block) and Roland E. Schiller, a manufacturer. Schiller began writing for television in 1950. He starred on the 1955 CBS sitcom Professional Father That same year, he wrote for two competing series, NBC's The Jimmy Durante Show and CBS's It's Always Jan. During 1954–1955, Schiller was one of the writers for That's My Boy, starring Eddie Mayehoff and Gil Stratton. Schiller's producing credits include The Good Guys and All's Fair.

Schiller also penned radio scripts for such classic shows as Duffy's Tavern, Abbott and Costello, The Adventures of Ozzie and Harriet, The Mel Blanc Show, Sweeney and March, The Jimmy Durante Show, and December Bride, and then for TV stars such as Danny Thomas, Ed Wynn, Garry Moore, and Red Buttons.

=== Creative partnership with Bob Weiskopf ===
The creative partnership and friendship with Bob Weiskopf began in 1953. Weiskopf, also a comedy writer, had just relocated to Los Angeles from New York City. Schiller's first wife recommended a school to Weiskopf's wife, and also mentioned that Schiller was looking for a partner. The two writers first collaborated on a radio script for the Our Miss Brooks show before delving into the new medium of network television. They wrote for popular 1950s shows such as Make Room for Daddy, The Bob Cummings Show, I Love Lucy, the television adaptation of the popular radio series My Favorite Husband, The Lucy-Desi Comedy Hour, and The Ann Sothern Show (which they co-created).

Further success would continue into the 1960s and 1970s with such series as New Comedy Showcase, Pete and Gladys, The Lucy Show, The Red Skelton Show, The Good Guys (where they were also co-producers), The Phyllis Diller Show, The Carol Burnett Show, The Flip Wilson Show, Maude (which they also co-produced), All in the Family and its spinoff series, Archie Bunker's Place. Schiller and Weiskopf were honored with two Emmy Awards, a pair of Peabody Awards, a Golden Globe, and the Writers Guild of America's Laurel Award for TV Writing Achievement.

=== Personal life ===
Schiller's first wife Joyce Harris died in 1965. They had two children, including director Tom Schiller. He was married to actress Sabrina Scharf (née Trentman) from May 25, 1968, until his death on October 10, 2017, in Pacific Palisades, California. They also had two children.

== Death ==
Schiller died on October 10, 2017, at his home, aged 98. According to official reports, the cause of death was not disclosed. He was interred at Eden Memorial Park, in Los Angeles, California.
