= List of Maude episodes =

Maude is a television series created as the first spin-off of All in the Family featuring Maude Findlay (Bea Arthur), Edith Bunker's cousin, who appeared in two episodes of the latter series' second season.

The first season of Maude was previously released on DVD by Sony Pictures Home Entertainment. In 2015, the complete series was made available in a large boxed set from Shout! Factory. In 2025, the complete series was available for streaming on Tubi.

== Series overview ==
Season	Episodes	Originally released		Rank	Rating
Season	Episodes	First released	Last released	Rank	Rating
1	22	September 12, 1972	March 20, 1973	4	24.7
2	24	September 11, 1973	March 5, 1974	6	23.5
3	23	September 9, 1974	March 31, 1975	9	24.9
4	24	September 8, 1975	March 15, 1976	4	25.0
5	24	September 20, 1976	April 4, 1977	31	19.9
6	24	September 12, 1977	April 22, 1978	75	15.2

== Episodes ==
=== Season 1 (1972–73) ===
No. overall	No. in season	Title	Directed by	Written by	Original release date	Prod. code
1	1	"Maude's Problem" "Maude and the Psychiatrist"	Robert H. Livingston	Susan Silver	September 12, 1972	0102
Maude (Bea Arthur) is suspicious when she notices changes to her daughter Carol's (Adrienne Barbeau) mood. Initially thinking Carol is having an affair, Maude is surprised to learn she is actually seeing a psychiatrist (William Redfield (actor)), and that he has a few questions for Maude.
2	2	"Doctor, Doctor"	Bill Hobin	Budd Grossman	September 19, 1972	0103
Carol's eight-year-old son Phillip (Brian Morrison) is caught playing doctor with next-door neighbor Arthur's (Conrad Bain) visiting granddaughter, Angela. Arthur insists that Phillip be punished for the act, while Carol and Maude believe it to be just simple young expression. This sparks an argument between Arthur and Maude on "the moral decay in our society".
3	3	"Maude Meets Florida"	Robert H. Livingston	Rod Parker, Walter Stone	September 26, 1972	0101
Forward-thinking Maude tries to prove her worth as a liberal by hiring a Black maid, Florida Evans (Esther Rolle). In doing so, Maude overcompensates by going out of her way to treat her as an "equal," which Florida cannot stand. Maude's husband Walter is troubled to find Phillip swearing into a tape recorder and then playing it back.
4	4	"Like Mother, Like Daughter"	Bill Hobin	Susan Harris	October 3, 1972	0104
Carol starts dating a man named Russell Asher (Cesare Danova) who once dumped her mother. While Maude does her best to warn Carol of his ways, Carol believes Maude is interfering too much in her life. However, a late night that went a bit too far, in which Russell calls Carol "Maude", proves that Maude was right.
5	5	"Maude and the Radical"	Bud Yorkin	T : Budd Grossman; S/T : Eugene Pratt	October 10, 1972	0105
Maude organizes a fund-raising party for a militant Black politician and invites all her rich white friends under false pretenses. She also tries to get Black people to attend the party, but the best she can do is make Florida go to the event, calling her Florida DuBonnet. Then, during the party, Maude mixes Arthur's prescribed tranquilizers with alcohol, which causes her to reveal the fundraising part of the party, and causing her guests to leave.
6	6	"The Ticket"	Bill Hobin	Erik Tarloff	October 17, 1972	0108
Maude receives a speeding ticket that could result in the suspension of her driver's license. Despite having a connection to someone who can "fix" the ticket, she insists on protesting the citation even after the judge immediately dismisses her "fixed" ticket.
7	7	"Love and Marriage"	Bill Hobin	S : Ralph Goodman; T : Budd Grossman	October 24, 1972	0107
Tired of being 27 years old and raising her son while living with her mother, Carol believes her ticket out of the house is to marry a man (Frank Aletter) she does not truly love. Meanwhile, Walter gets tired of Maude neglecting him, which leads to a dish-breaking fight in the kitchen.
8	8	"Flashback"	Bill Hobin	Alan J. Levitt	October 31, 1972	0109
While Maude and Walter wait to see who won the presidential election, they reminisce about the same night four years before. Carol is going through a divorce and moving in with Maude, and Walter and Maude must make a decision either to marry or just cohabit.
9	9	"Maude's Dilemma: Part 1"	Bill Hobin	S : Austin & Irma Kalish; T : Susan Harris	November 14, 1972	0106
At 47 years old, Maude discovers she is pregnant and must figure out how to tell the news to Walter as she plays cards with neighbor Dr. Arthur Harmon and best friend Vivian Cavender (Rue McClanahan).
10	10	"Maude's Dilemma: Part 2"	Bill Hobin	S : Austin & Irma Kalish; T : Susan Harris	November 21, 1972	0113
Carol suggests that Maude should terminate the pregnancy now that the practice is legal in the state of New York. Maude cannot gauge Walter's reaction, as he is publicly indifferent to the idea. After soul-searching and taking advice from Carol, Walter, Arthur and Vivian, Maude decides to terminate the pregnancy.
11	11	"Maude's Reunion"	Bill Hobin	T : Alan J. Levitt, Budd Grossman; S/T : Leo Rifkin	November 28, 1972	0111
Maude reunites with an old high school friend, Phyllis "Bunny" Nash (Barbara Rush), who was not a beauty when Maude knew her. She is horrified to learn that Ms. Nash is now a very attractive, single career woman, and it makes Maude resentful of her own position in life, especially when she bonds with Carol.
12	12	"The Grass Story"	Bill Hobin	Arnold Kane, Gordon Farr	December 5, 1972	0112
Maude stands up for her principles when she hears of a teenager arrested for possession of marijuana. Maude convinces her rich liberal girlfriends to picket with her at the police station, and to get arrested themselves as a symbolic move when the police sees that they are also in possession of the drug. It proves to be a challenge for Maude to "score" some, but when she does, she and Walter fight over it.
13	13	"The Slumlord"	Bill Hobin	S : Marvin Kaplan; T : Woody Kling	December 19, 1972	0110
Maude and Walter are labeled slumlords after they learn that they own a rundown apartment building and someone pickets the conditions on their front lawn. It leads to problems for Phillip and aggravation for Florida, who temporarily quits her job.
14	14	"The Convention"	Hal Cooper	Bob Schiller, Bob Weiskopf	January 2, 1973	0114
Maude accompanies Walter to an appliance convention in Massachusetts. They must share a room in a cheap motel after their reservations are mixed up at their first choice of hotel. At this inopportune time, Maude shares her feelings with Walter about the lack of meaning in her life and the difficulties she is facing in her quest for employment due to her gender. This leads to another fight between them.
15	15	"Walter's 50th Birthday"	Hal Cooper	S : Maurice Richlin; T : Pamela Herbert Chais	January 23, 1973	0116
Maude prepares a surprise birthday party for Walter, who is depressed about turning 50. Always the optimist, however, Maude brings over an old friend to cheer Walter up, but it leads to even more ruin when the friend shows up to the party and dies. Maude and Walter argue, with them throwing their respective suitcases through the bedroom windows.
16	16	"Maude and the Medical Profession"	Hal Cooper	T : Alan J. Levitt; S/T : Lou Shaw	January 30, 1973	0117
Maude and Walter are all ready to take their second honeymoon to Rome. A tetanus shot Maude received as a prerequisite for travel gives her a rash, and when she encounters a busy doctor (Tom Bosley) who gives her medication without telling her correct dosage, her equilibrium becomes completely off balance, forcing both of them to cancel their trip. Out $800 for their deposit, they are enraged enough to sue the doctor for malpractice.
17	17	"Arthur Moves In"	Hal Cooper	S : Norman, Harriet Belkin; T : Pamela Herbert Chais	February 6, 1973	0118
Arthur quickly wears out his welcome with Maude and Florida after he must move in due to fire damage at his house. After one demand too many, Maude insists that Walter tell Arthur to get out.
18	18	"Florida's Problem"	Hal Cooper	S : Alan J. Levitt; T : Budd Grossman	February 13, 1973	0119
Florida's husband Henry (John Amos) insists that she does not need to work, and after he starts a second job, he gives her an ultimatum to quit. When Maude hears of the news, Maude stands up for Florida's rights while Walter sides with Henry.
19	19	"Walter's Secret"	Hal Cooper	Bob Schiller, Bob Weiskopf	February 27, 1973	0120
Carol catches Walter having a cozy drink with a much younger woman who used to work for him at his appliance business, Gladys Horton. Carol tells Maude, and fearing the worst, demands that Walter take his things and move out.
20	20	"Maude's Good Deed"	Hal Cooper	Pamela Herbert Chais	March 6, 1973	0121
Maude's old friend Jane comes to visit, but the things turn sour when Maude tries to reconcile Jane with her daughter Linda (Lee Lawson), who sued her mother over her inheritance and later snags away Arthur, whom Jane dated! The next day, Maude's final plan for peace goes completely awry.
21	21	"The Perfect Marriage"	Hal Cooper	Bob Schiller, Bob Weiskopf	March 13, 1973	0122
Maude's best friend Vivian Cavender unexpectedly announces that she is getting a divorce, which shakes Maude as she believed Vivian's marriage to be completely perfect. It leads Maude to her own neuroses and second thoughts about her own marriage and how perfect it is.
22	22	"Maude's Night Out"	Hal Cooper	Pamela Herbert Chais	March 20, 1973	0123
While getting ready for Cliff Naylor's party, Maude makes Walter jealous with the revelation that Cliff always checks Maude out. Walter responds by dropping a bomb on Maude: Cliff is cheating on his wife. Maude feels foolish that Cliff went after another woman and perhaps she is not as sexually attractive as she thought she was.

=== Season 2 (1973–74) ===
No. overall	No. in season	Title	Directed by	Written by	Original release date	Prod. code
23	1	"Walter's Problem: Part 1"	Hal Cooper	Bob Schiller, Bob Weiskopf	September 11, 1973	0203
A night of partying ends with many questions for Maude. How did Maude and Arthur end up in bed together? Why is her living room decimated? Who made a crank call to Maude's mother? The answer to the last question is Walter, and Carol's comment that Walter may have a drinking problem upsets him. Walter, who insists that he can drink with Maude anytime he wants, gets so drunk that he ruins Phillip's birthday cake, and after an argument, Walter slaps Maude across the face, then he felt guilty of assault and suffered a breakdown.
24	2	"Walter's Problem: Part 2"	Hal Cooper	Bob Schiller, Bob Weiskopf	September 18, 1973	0205
Maude receives a black eye from the force of Walter's slap. Arthur sends over a reverend who is a recovering alcoholic to talk to Walter. A drunk Walter rebuffs everyone's pleas for help and finds the last bottle of alcohol in the house; Maude was nearly successful in clearing out the house earlier. When Maude and Walter have an argument, Carol announces that she is leaving with Phillip. Phillip telling Walter that he loves him breaks Walter; he throws the bottle of liquor through the kitchen window and asks for the reverend's help.
25	3	"Walter's Holiday"	Hal Cooper	Budd Grossman	September 25, 1973	0202
Walter makes up a holiday called "National I Love You Day," hoping to have a romantic day alone with Maude. However, Vivian Cavender, recently divorced, comes over crying and Maude has to tend to her friend. With Walter's plans ruined, he takes out his frustrations at the gym with Arthur. Guest starring Johnny Brown as a salesman.
26	4	"Maude's Facelift: Part 1"	Hal Cooper	Susan Harris	October 2, 1973	0207
Recently divorced, Maude's friend Vivian decides to get a facelift. Carol and Walter love the "new Vivian" but Maude has nothing but contempt for Vivian's decision. Vivian rightly deems Maude jealous; Maude then makes an appointment to get the procedure done, keeping it secret from Walter.
27	5	"Maude's Facelift: Part 2"	Hal Cooper	Rod Parker	October 9, 1973	0208
Maude returns from Boston after a three-week "holiday," where she got her face lifted. Maude loves her facelift, but she quickly becomes angry when Walter, who didn't know she was going for a procedure, doesn't notice anything different about her face.
28	6	"Florida's Affair"	Hal Cooper	Alan J. Levitt	October 16, 1973	0206
Florida doesn't know how to turn down the furnace repairman (Ron Glass) who has his eye on her. It causes problems between Florida and her husband Henry (John Amos) after Henry spies the repairman dancing with Florida. Maude and Walter would rather he finish work on their furnace.
29	7	"Maude Takes a Job"	Hal Cooper	Pamela Herbert Chais	October 23, 1973	0201
Maude finally lands a job as a real estate agent. Walter quickly becomes resentful of Maude's new position because he misses her being home in the evenings and it interrupts his routine. He orders her to quit her new job.
30	8	"The Double Standard"	Hal Cooper	Budd Grossman	October 30, 1973	0204
Carol and her boyfriend Chris (Fred Grandy) return from a camping trip and Maude has a dilemma which flies in the face of her purported liberal leanings; should her daughter sleep in the same room as her boyfriend or should he sleep out in the guest room? To make matters more complicated, Carol and Chris announce their engagement. Note: An early version of this episode, titled "Maude's Double Standard", was taped during the first season, and featured a different actor portraying Carol's boyfriend. The episode was shelved for unknown reasons, and slightly retooled and re-taped for season two. The original version was eventually released on Shout! Factory's complete series set. Its production code was #0115.
31	9	"Vivian's Problem"	Hal Cooper	Pamela Herbert Chais	November 6, 1973	0209
Maude is not hitting the right notes with Vivian when she fails in her matchmaking attempts for the divorcée. Vivian decides to date a 70-year-old retired sailor, and Maude is so convinced that she can do better that she fixes Vivian up with Arthur, whom Maude doesn't even like.
32	10	"Maude's Musical"	Hal Cooper	Woody Kling	November 13, 1973	0210
Maude is in charge of choreographing a charity musical to raise funds for a library. Arthur voices his objections to the skits as he feels Maude's burlesque theme is too daring. Maude has to decide whether she will do the musical Arthur's way or not at all.
33	11	"The Will"	Hal Cooper	S : Leonard B. Kaufman, Jim Simmons; T : Albert E. Lewin	November 27, 1973	0211
Maude and Walter are about to accept a "husband and wife of the year" award until a drag-out fight occurs between the two, regarding Walter naming Arthur trustee in his will. Walter is forced to reconcile with obstinate Maude as she announces her intent not to go to the awards banquet.
34	12	"Carol's Problem"	Hal Cooper	Budd Grossman	December 4, 1973	0215
As Chris and Carol's wedding day approaches, Maude gives them their gift early; Maude has paid a down payment on a house. Everyone has a bone to pick with Maude when it is revealed that the house is a bit too close to home... just across the street!
35	13	"Music Hath Charms"	Hal Cooper	T : Bob Schiller, Bob Weiskopf; S/T : Gordon Mitchell, Lloyd Turner	December 11, 1973	0212
Maude's gift-giving backfires again when she presents Walter with an electric organ as a present for their fifth wedding anniversary. Walter loves the gift, but he plays long and loud, annoying everyone. An argument leads Walter to drive off and crash his car into a tree; when he is unhurt, the house finds peace... temporarily. Later on, an argument over a past done steak, leads Maude and Walter to have a public fight in a restaurant.
36	14	"The Office Party"	Hal Cooper	Woody Kling	December 18, 1973	0214
Walter hosts his workers at his house for a holiday party. They give him some startling news: they plan on forming a union. Walter is furious and plans on firing everyone in on the plan, but he has someone in else to answer to: Maude.
37	15	"The Love Birds"	Hal Cooper	Dick Wesson	January 1, 1974	0217
Vivian and Walter are fed up with Arthur and Maude constantly mentioning their late spouses. Arguments erupt between the two couples, but are eventually quelled. Vivian and Arthur announce to Maude and Walter that they are going to be married.
38	16	"Maude's Guest"	Hal Cooper	Alan J. Levitt	January 8, 1974	0218
Maude houses a teenage Black girl from the ghetto, Francie Potter (Tamu Blackwell). The teen shows her true colors, absolutely hating Maude's "liberal guilt complex" towards Black people, and she makes life difficult for everyone in the house until Maude finally puts her foot down.
39	17	"The Wallet"	Hal Cooper	T : Budd Grossman, Alan J. Levitt; S/T : Max Hodge	January 15, 1974	0213
Maude finds a wallet belonging to a man who is known for his marital indiscretions. Walter and Maude get into an argument after Walter lets it known that he believes a wallet to be private, which leads to Maude snooping around behind everyone's backs. A case of misunderstandings lead Maude to a woman she is convinced Walter is seeing on the side.
40	18	"Maude's Revolt"	Hal Cooper	S : Lloyd Garver, Ken Hecht; T : Lila Garrett	January 22, 1974	0220
Walter organizes a surprise birthday party for Maude, who is not handling aging well. Maude wants her birthday to go according to her plans, so she tells Walter to stay by her side and not to "go off with the men" to the other side of the room. When he strays from his promise, Maude leaves the party and locks herself in their bedroom. While Maude is sulking, Arthur yells, "FIRE!" which earns him a drenching from her.
41	19	"The Commuter Station"	Hal Cooper	Woody Kling	January 29, 1974	0219
Maude convinces Arthur and Vivian to have a winter wedding in Vermont. As Maude, Walter, Carol, Chris and the soon-to-be marrieds take a train up from Tuckahoe, a blizzard strands them in a train station. Arthur is having cold feet about committing to Vivian, and Maude lets him know exactly how she feels. John Hillerman guest stars as a drunk.
42	20	"Florida's Goodbye"	Hal Cooper	John Rappaport	February 5, 1974	0216
Florida's husband Henry receives a job promotion and Florida has decided to stay at home to be a housewife. Maude takes the news very hard, turning down every possible applicant for the position, and eventually has to come to terms with Florida's departure. Last appearance by Esther Rolle in the role of Florida Evans, as she was spun off into her own show, Good Times, that same week.
43	21	"The Tax Audit"	Hal Cooper	Bernie Kahn	February 12, 1974	0221
Maude is in for a rude awakening as the man (Larry Haines) who conducts Walter's tax audit is the same man who attempted to rape her three decades before. Walter doesn't want to address the subject, forcing Maude to take matters into her own hands, giving the auditor a history lesson he won't forget. With this episode, Rue McClanahan becomes a regular and is listed in opening credits.
44	22	"The Investment"	Hal Cooper	Elliot Shoenman	February 19, 1974	0223
Bad feelings abound when Arthur gives Walter a bad stock tip, causing him to lose $3,700. An inquiry into why Arthur didn't invest money in the stock himself causes bad blood not only between the two men but also between Maude and Vivian.
45	23	"Phillip's Problem"	Hal Cooper	Budd Grossman	February 26, 1974	0222
Phillip is going through behavioral problems, and Walter suggests the boy get a spanking. Maude is completely against the idea until Carol and Chris leave for a weekend vacation and she's stuck dealing with Phillip and his insolence.
46	24	"The Runaway"	Hal Cooper	Alan J. Levitt, Budd Grossman	March 5, 1974	0224
Francie Potter (Tamu Blackwell), the teenage girl who stayed with Maude months before, returns with a fabrication about her father mistreating and abusing her, in the hopes that Maude will give her money to "escape him." In reality, she and her boyfriend simply want to run away together.

=== Season 3 (1974–75) ===
No. overall	No. in season	Title	Directed by	Written by	Original release date	Prod. code
47	1	"Maude Meets the Duke"	Hal Cooper	Robert Hilliard, Bob Schiller, Bob Weiskopf	September 9, 1974	0306
John Wayne is making a new movie, and he is visiting Arthur in Tuckahoe as part of publicity; Arthur believes he is John Wayne's number one fan. The day looks like it's going to be ruined when Arthur and Vivian's roof caves in, but Arthur talks Maude into hosting the event, on the condition that Maude say a few choice words to the Duke about his views on feminism. When he does turn up, Maude is so starstruck that she forgets everything she wanted to say.
48	2	"The Kiss"	Hal Cooper	Elliot Shoenman	September 16, 1974	0301
Maude believes Walter is going through a midlife crisis after Walter takes up smoking a pipe and wearing platform shoes. Vivian runs to Maude's crying over an argument she had with Arthur about her dog. What causes the most drama, however, is a kiss Walter shares with Vivian, angering Maude and Arthur.
49	3	"Walter's Heart Attack"	Hal Cooper	Budd Grossman	September 23, 1974	0305
Walter misses a special dinner with Maude because he is trying to stop his bookkeeper (Jill Clayburgh) from killing herself due to her husband leaving her. Maude believes he is having an affair and bites her tongue while Walter recovers.
50	4	"The New Housekeeper"	Hal Cooper	Bob Schiller, Bob Weiskopf	September 30, 1974	0302
Maude hires a new housekeeper from England, Nell Naugatuck. Maude and Mrs. Naugatuck get along well initially but clash when Mrs. Naugatuck insists on catering to Walter's every need since he is "master of the house," to Maude's disdain. Note: First appearance of Hermione Baddeley as Mrs. Naugatuck.
51	5	"Speed Trap"	Hal Cooper	Elliot Shoenman	October 7, 1974	0308
Arthur and Walter go on a camping trip. Maude is upset with Walter's decision but quickly drowns her sorrows in food with Vivian. The men get in trouble as they are arrested for speeding in a well-known "speed trap" zone and they need the women to get them out of jail. Guest starring Héctor Elizondo as a cop.
52	6	"Lovers in Common"	Hal Cooper	Pamela Herbert Chais	October 14, 1974	0307
While Arthur and Walter are out of town golfing, Maude and Vivian go out to a restaurant for drinks. They both have a secret to share: old flames sent them postcards announcing their imminent arrival in town. Upon seeing each other's postcards, they realize their "old flames" are in fact the same man, and they quickly get drunk while arguing over which woman he "really wants."
53	7	"Walter's Dream"	Hal Cooper	S : Ben Starr; T : Dick Clair, Jenna McMahon	October 21, 1974	0304
Walter returns from a fishing trip in Canada with the news that he wants to move him and Maude up to Canada to live in the woods. Maude doesn't like the idea one bit and plays a trick of reverse psychology on Walter, which backfires when he tries to sell his appliance store.
54	8	"A Night to Remember"	Hal Cooper	Bob Schiller, Bob Weiskopf	November 4, 1974	0309
Walter has business troubles on the mind late at night, and Maude makes it no easier with her own dilemma. Despite the stress Walter is feeling, Maude tells Walter that the doctor believes it be best for her to have a hysterectomy.
55	9	"Last Tango in Tuckahoe"	Hal Cooper	Bob Schiller, Bob Weiskopf	November 11, 1974	0311
Mrs. Naugatuck is caught sneaking men into the house when Walter and Maude discover a man in her closet. Mrs. Naugatuck is highly offended and demands her right to privacy as part of her wages include room and board. Guest starring James Cromwell.
56	10	"Vivian's Party"	Hal Cooper	S : Barbara Avedon, Barbara Corday; T : Elliot Shoenman	November 18, 1974	0303
Arthur tells Vivian on short notice that she has to prepare a dinner party for twelve guests. Vivian's maid quits on the spot, forcing Maude and Mrs. Naugatuck to help Vivian with her dinner. Hell hath no fury like Maude scorned when she finds out that she and Walter are not invited to Vivian's party! Helen Martin guest stars as Stella, Arthur's housekeeper.
57	11	"Maude the Boss"	Hal Cooper	S : Lloyd Garver, Ken Hecht; T : Rod Parker, Bob Schiller, Bob Weiskopf	November 25, 1974	0310
Maude is promoted at her real estate agency. She is now working as office manager with three men who report to her. Two of the men don't have a problem with a female boss, but one does and tries to sabotage Maude at every turn. Guest starring Herb Edelman, over a decade before he'd regularly appear with Arthur and McClanahan on The Golden Girls as Dorothy's ex-husband Stan.
58	12	"Maude's New Friend"	Hal Cooper	Rod Parker	December 2, 1974	0312
Maude makes friends with a well-known writer (Robert Mandan), who happens to be gay. Walter does not approve of Maude's friendship, and not because he's a man or because he's gay, but because Walter feels Maude's friend is very condescending to him. At the same time, Maude has to deal with the fact that she isn't as liberal as she thought when it comes to her preconceived notions of gay people.
59	13	"Walter's Ex"	Hal Cooper	S : Sybil Adelman, Barbara Gallagher; T : Elliot Shoenman	December 9, 1974	0313
Maude and Walter may finally be able to take their dream trip to Japan, as Walter's ex-wife Marta (Carole Cook) has informed him that she will be remarrying, allowing Walter to stop with alimony payments. Maude's rich Uncle Henry has also announced that he will be remarrying. Walter and Maude realize Marta is going to be marrying Henry and, knowing Marta's history via Walter, immediately become concerned that she is only marrying him because she's a gold-digger.
60	14	"Nostalgia Party"	Hal Cooper	T : Budd Grossman, Elliot Shoenman; S/T : Michael Morris	December 30, 1974	0315
Maude thinks up a great idea for a New Year's party when she suggests that the guests dress up as "the best year of their lives." The party leads to an argument between the guests as to why their year is the best.
61	15	"All Psyched Out"	Hal Cooper	Barbara Gallagher, Sybil Adelman	January 6, 1975	0314
A psychic tells Maude her fortune. Among other things, she tells Maude that she will remarry for the fifth time. When the other events in her fortune start coming true, she convinces herself the only way to stay married to Walter is to marry him again. Walter is not so thrilled with the idea. Guest starring Paul Benedict as a minister.
62	16	"The Telethon"	Hal Cooper	Norm Liebmann	January 20, 1975	0317
Maude organizes a telethon which is raising money for no cause at all, as the charity Maude endorsed backed out at the last minute. It is up to Maude to think up a cause or charity while on the air, or else the station pulls the plug.
63	17	"And Then There Were None"	Hal Cooper	Charlie Hauck	January 27, 1975	0318
Carol announces her engagement to a man (Don Chastain) who will be divorcing his wife (Audra Lindley) "soon." Maude makes sure everyone knows she disapproves, which cause both Mrs. Naugatuck and Carol to protest Maude's overbearing ways, and they both move out.
64	18	"The Emergence of Vivian"	Hal Cooper	Dick Bensfield, Perry Grant	February 3, 1975	0319
Maude has gotten Vivian involved in the Congress of Women, and it is causing her to neglect dinner and the laundry, which Arthur hates. Arthur and Vivian get into a fight about her new hobby, and it's up to Vivian to balance her duties as wife and feminist and up to Arthur to stop expecting outdated notions of what a wife should be.
65	19	"Mrs. Naugatuck in Love"	Hal Cooper	Charlie Hauck	February 10, 1975	0320
Mrs. Naugatuck's behavior has changed, which makes everyone suspicious. They find out that she is in love, and they throw Mrs. Naugatuck a bridal shower when her special man asks her to marry him. At the shower, Mrs. Naugatuck receives news that the wedding is off, which humiliates and depresses her.
66	20	"Walter's Pride"	Hal Cooper	Elliot Shoenman	February 24, 1975	0321
Walter has been stressed out about expenses, and is gaining weight. It turns out, he needs $12,000 to bail the business out of the red; if he does not get the money within a week, he will have to file for bankruptcy. Despite Walter's insistence not to, Maude mortgages the house behind his back and then gives him the money to pay off his debt, which Walter does not want to do.
67	21	"Walter Gets Religion"	Hal Cooper	Charlie Hauck	March 3, 1975	0322
Walter has found a new interest in church and makes Maude attend services with him. Maude is terribly bored at the prospect and falls asleep during the sermon. She finds out that Walter may really only be going to church because the people there want to buy appliances from him. Guest starring Graham Jarvis as Reverend Williamson.
68	22	"The Cabin"	Hal Cooper	Budd Grossman	March 10, 1975	0323
Arthur and Vivian decide to go on a romantic retreat to a mountain cabin. Maude senses the chance to put some fire back into her own marriage and organizes her own vacation to the mountains with Walter. The weekend is less than what Maude hoped for, discouraging her.
69	23	"Maude's Mother"	Hal Cooper	S : Michael Morris; T : Budd Grossman, Elliot Shoenman	March 31, 1975	0324
Maude's mother (Audrey Christie) comes to visit for the first time since Maude married Walter. However, this is inconveniently timed as Walter's television ads for Findlay's Friendly Appliances start running, with Walter only wearing underclothes and a barrel, calling himself "Wow-ee Wally," which amuses Maude's mother and mortifies Maude.

=== Season 4 (1975–76) ===
No. overall	No. in season	Title	Directed by	Written by	Original release date	Prod. code
70	1	"The Split"	Hal Cooper	Pamela Herbert Chais	September 8, 1975	0402
Maude has to choose whether or not to run for a seat in the New York state senate. Walter becomes jealous when he feels Maude isn't supporting him, and finally puts his foot down; he demands Maude either choose him or her new political career.
71	2	"Consenting Adults"	Hal Cooper	Karyl Geld Miller, Pamela Herbert Chais	September 15, 1975	0403
Maude feels bad about her argument with Walter, and she goes to his new apartment, where he took refuge after refusing to return to the house. Seeing his very mod bachelor pad insults Maude, as she hoped for a reconciliation. Maude and Walter ultimately decide to divorce.
72	3	"Rumpus in the Rumpus Room"	Hal Cooper	Marilyn Suzanne Miller	September 22, 1975	0404
At Vivian and Arthur's 2nd anniversary party, Maude and Walter show up with separate dates; Maude arrives with a Senator (James Olson) while Walter arrives with a young woman (Bernadette Peters), which infuriates Maude. A vicious argument causes Walter to turn to the bottle once more. When Maude checks to see if Walter has arrived home safely, she finds him in bed with someone else.
73	4	"Maude's Big Decision"	Hal Cooper	Charlie Hauck	September 29, 1975	0405
Maude is more than relieved to find out that Walter was in bed with Arthur; they both passed out together after their night of partying. Maude finally decides to step down from the election if it means Walter will become sober again, but it is Walter who has the true change of heart and reconciles with Maude, giving her his full blessing about her role in politics.
74	5	"The Election"	Hal Cooper	Charlie Hauck	October 6, 1975	0406
Maude comes to the realization that she may lose the election for state senate, especially after a television interview in which she voices her liberal views about premarital sex is poorly received. She feels better knowing her marriage with Walter is intact again.
75	6	"Viv's Dog"	Hal Cooper	S : Mike Milligan, Jay Moriarty; T : Charlie Hauck	October 20, 1975	0401
Vivian and Arthur go on holiday and leave Vivian's dog in the care of Maude. The dog passes away leaving Maude feeling guilty and unsure how to break the news to a distraught Vivian. Guest starring Teri Garr as Mrs. Carlson.
76	7	"For the Love of Bert"	Hal Cooper	George Tibbles	October 27, 1975	0408
Mrs. Naugutuck has been making up various stories to persuade Maude and Bert to give her extra money. First episode featuring J. Pat O'Malley as Bert Beasley.
77	8	"The Fling"	Hal Cooper	Phil Sharp	November 3, 1975	0407
Vivian's ex-husband Chuck (William Redfield) comes back to town, wealthier and more charming than ever. Vivian falls under his spell, and Maude decides she must take action to prevent an affair between the two.
78	9	"The Analyst"	Hal Cooper	Jay Folb	November 10, 1975	0409
A revealing psychoanalysis session helps Maude gather the missing pieces of her past so she can begin to understand the present. This episode is largely a solo piece for Beatrice Arthur.
79	10	"Arthur's Medical Convention"	Hal Cooper	Phil Sharp	November 17, 1975	0410
Walter joins in on the practical joking fun at Arthur's medical convention, but it backfires on him when he's left tending to a heart attack victim.
80	11	"Arthur Gets a Partner"	Hal Cooper	Phil Sharp	November 24, 1975	0412
Arthur desperately needs money to protect an investment, but, out of pride, he refuses to take an offer from Vivian.
81	12	"Walter's Ethics"	Hal Cooper	Arthur Marx, Bob Fisher	December 1, 1975	0411
Walter has a chance to sell his store for a huge profit. Maude is pleased until she finds out that Walter has arranged a date between one of his employees and the married buyer (Robert Mandan).
82	13	"Poor Albert"	Hal Cooper	Fred S. Fox, Seaman Jacobs	December 8, 1975	0416
Maude receives the ashes of her long-suffering ex-husband, "Poor Albert," just as Walter's blowout Founder's Day sale approaches. As a result, she must debate whether to stay in Tuckahoe to support Walter during his sale, or drive to the mountains to fulfill Poor Albert's final request.
83	14	"The Christmas Party"	Hal Cooper	Woody Kling	December 22, 1975	0415
With Christmas on the way, Walter has his annual office Christmas party at the house, however, he's worried that Maude's feminist friend, Stephanie (Neva Patterson), who goes out of her way to preach to everyone on women's rights, will put a damper on the festivities.
84	15	"The Case of the Broken Punch Bowl"	Hal Cooper	Elliot Shoenman	January 5, 1976	0417
Maude's priceless crystal punch bowl is shattered at a party given by the Harmons, at which Carol and Mrs. Naugatuck were both present — but separating the truth from Arthur's, Vivian's, and Mrs. Naugatuck's perception of the truth proves a challenge. Until Carol arrives and reveals what really happened. Guest starring Lyle Waggoner as a party guest who (in various versions) Carol and Vivian flirt with.
85	16	"Walter's Stigma"	Hal Cooper	Jay Folb	January 12, 1976	0418
When Walter is falsely arrested for indecent exposure, Maude seeks to protect his reputation from a petty gossip columnist (Alice Ghostley).
86	17	"Maude's Mood: Part 1"	Hal Cooper	Jay Folb	January 26, 1976	0413
Maude initiates a campaign to elect Henry Fonda the President of the United States, without even knowing whether Fonda is interested in the office. Walter speaks to a psychiatrist (Tim O'Connor (actor)) about the matter and learns Maude may be manic-depressive.
87	18	"Maude's Mood: Part 2"	Hal Cooper	Charlie Hauck, Jay Folb	February 2, 1976	0414
Even though Henry Fonda categorically refuses to run for President, Maude persists in campaigning for his election, draining the family's energy and bank account in the process.
88	19	"Tuckahoe Bicentennial"	Hal Cooper	Seaman Jacobs, Milton Pascal	February 9, 1976	0419
Maude stages a tribute to American women for the Tuckahoe Bicentennial celebration and all the men are convinced it is a money losing proposition. After seeing some of the practice performances, the man who owns the studio pulls out. However, it seems that all the men were wrong, soon the show is sold out. Guest starring Richard Deacon and Phil Leeds.
89	20	"Mrs. Naugatuck's Citizenship"	Hal Cooper	Jay Folb	February 16, 1976	0420
Mrs. Naugatuck has been studying to take her final exam to become a United States citizen. However, the day before the examination, she falls ill after suffering a minor stroke and is hospitalized, putting her chances of becoming a citizen in jeopardy.
90	21	"Maude's Nephew"	Hal Cooper	S : Budd Grossman; S/T : Charlie Hauck	February 23, 1976	0421
Walter has become fed up with Maude's nephew, Steve (Jerry Houser), who has been staying with the Findlays. Steve's laid back lifestyle quickly begins to appear as a cover for his lack of responsibility, when his 19-year-old ex-girlfriend shows up at the front door with an announcement... she's pregnant.
91	22	"Maude's Rejection"	Hal Cooper	Jay Folb	March 1, 1976	0423
Maude tries to ingratiate herself with an acerbic English writer (Clive Revill), but she fails to appreciate his honesty when he tells her he can't stand her.
92	23	"Carol's Promotion"	Hal Cooper	Phil Sharp	March 8, 1976	0422
Carol is passed over for a promotion which she feels she could have gotten if she'd responded to her boss's advances. Maude goes to pieces when Carol sets up a date between the boss and herself.
93	24	"Maude's Ex-Convict"	Anthony Chickey	Charlie Hauck	March 15, 1976	0424
Maude hires an ex-convict (Bob Balaban) to fill in for a vacationing Mrs. Naugutuck, confident she can integrate him back into society. However, her idealism fails her when she finds out he was convicted for murdering his old bosses.

=== Season 5 (1976–77) ===
No. overall	No. in season	Title	Directed by	Written by	Original release date	Prod. code
94	1	"Vivian's First Funeral"	Hal Cooper	Sam Greenbaum	September 20, 1976	0501
Vivian's phobia of funerals makes her a nervous wreck when she must attend the funeral of a friend with Maude. To complicate matters, Vivian is also nervous when she discovers Maude lost the antique brooch that Arthur had given her, which she lent to Maude who in turn lent it to someone else, whom Maude cannot remember. Maude and Vivian soon discover just whom it was Maude had lent the brooch to.
95	2	"Maude and Chester"	Hal Cooper	S : Howard Albrecht, Sol Weinstein; T : Pamela Herbert Chais	September 27, 1976	0506
Maude meets her ex-husband Chester (Martin Balsam) to clear up some legal issues, but they end up locked in the lawyer's office.
96	3	"Bert Moves In"	Hal Cooper	Arthur Julian	October 4, 1976	0505
Bert proposes to Mrs. Naugatuck, then withdraws his proposal when he loses his job and must move in with her to save money.
97	4	"Walter's Crisis: Part 1"	Hal Cooper	Charlie Hauck	October 11, 1976	0502
While on vacation, Walter is denied a loan to expand his business, and is forced to declare bankruptcy.
98	5	"Walter's Crisis: Part 2"	Hal Cooper	S : Donald King; T : Arthur Julian	October 18, 1976	0503
Walter goes into a deep depression when he finds himself out of a job, and then overdoses on sleeping pills.
99	6	"Walter's Crisis: Part 3"	Hal Cooper	S : Donald King; T : William Davenport	October 25, 1976	0504
Walter is hospitalized and then institutionalized. He begins to use the institution to hide from his problems rather than face them.
100	7	"The Election"	Hal Cooper	Thad Mumford	November 1, 1976	0507
With election day just around the corner, Carol goes to the precinct to help out and Maude gets the chance to meet her daughter's new boyfriend (Michael O'Keefe) – a man who's ten years younger than Carol.
101	8	"The Game Show"	Hal Cooper	Jay Folb	November 8, 1976	0509
The Findlays and the Harmons go to New York, where Maude and Vivian are chosen to be contestants on a game show. Guest starring Conrad Janis and Johnny Olson as the host and announcer of "Beat The Devil".
102	9	"Arthur's Worry"	Hal Cooper	S : Kathy Gori, Michael Smollins; T : Arthur Julian	November 15, 1976	0508
Walter fears an upcoming camping trip with Arthur because he's dreamt that he kissed him.
103	10	"Mrs. Naugatuck's Wedding"	Hal Cooper	Arthur Julian, William Davenport	November 22, 1976	0512
Mrs. Naugatuck refuses to change her last name at her wedding, leading the men and women to take sides on the matter. Note: Brian Morrison's final episode as Phillip Traynor.
104	11	"Maude's New Friends"	Hal Cooper	Pamela Herbert Chais	November 29, 1976	0513
The Harmons introduce the Findlays to a couple (James Coco and Helen Page Camp) who are interested in wife-swapping. Note: An early version of this episode, with the same title, was taped during the third season. The episode was shelved for unknown reasons, and slightly retooled and re-taped for season five. The original version was eventually released on Shout! Factory's complete series set. Its production code was #0316.
105	12	"The Rip-Off"	Hal Cooper	Charles Tannen, Tom Adair	December 13, 1976	0510
Walter goes to extremes to find security when he and the Harmons come home from the movies to find Maude tied up and the place burglarized.
106	13	"Walter's Christmas Gift"	Hal Cooper	Thad Mumford	December 20, 1976	0514
Since the Findlays' finances are so low, they decide to give homemade gifts for Christmas, while Arthur offers Walter a partnership in a new business.
107	14	"Captain Hero"	Hal Cooper	Harry Cauley	January 3, 1977	0515
Maude's visiting cousin (John Byner) insults one of potential contributors to her mental health clinic.
108	15	"Maude's Adult Relationship"	Hal Cooper	Charlie Hauck	January 17, 1977	0516
At Arthur's insistence, Walter starts to worry that Maude is having lunch with her handsome work associate (Liam Sullivan).
109	16	"Arthur's Crisis"	Hal Cooper	Charlie Hauck	February 7, 1977	0511
Walter's fun-loving prankster friend (Eugene Roche) dies during an operation, leading Arthur to question his abilities as a doctor. Guest starring Michael Keaton, Charles Lane and Mary Jo Catlett.
110	17	"Maude's Desperate Hours"	Hal Cooper	Arthur Julian	February 14, 1977	0517
With Walter out of town, Maude keeps getting threatening phone calls – and the caller may be a painter recently hired to work on the house.
111	18	"Maude's Reunion"	Hal Cooper	S : Bruce Kane, Sandy Veith; T : Charlie Hauck	February 21, 1977	0519
Maude attends her 30th high school reunion and discovers that one of her oldest friends (Nanette Fabray) just had a stroke.
112	19	"Feminine Fulfillment"	Hal Cooper	S : Jennie Blackton, Joanne Greenberg; T : Charlie Hauck, Thad Mumford	February 28, 1977	0520
Maude is shocked that Vivian joined a woman's group that encourages women to be subject to their husband's whims.
113	20	"Maude's Aunt"	Hal Cooper	William Davenport	March 7, 1977	0518
Maude's aunt Lola (Eve Arden) visits and proves to be just as caustic as she is.
114	21	"Arthur's New Best Friend"	Hal Cooper	Elliot Shoenman	March 14, 1977	0522
Walter and Arthur each have new best friends (Macon McCalman and Larry Gelman).
115	22	"Vivian's Surprise"	Hal Cooper	Arthur Julian, William Davenport	March 21, 1977	0521
Vivian is surprised that Arthur's had a change of heart when he returns from a trip. Guest starring Conrad Bain's twin brother, Bonar Bain.
116	23	"The Household Feud"	Hal Cooper	Arthur Julian, William Davenport	March 28, 1977	0523
Maude and Mrs. Naugatuck get into a feud that starts with the Findlays not being invited to the party and Maude accidentally breaking Mrs. Naugatuck's urn. Note: Final appearances of Hermione Baddeley and J. Pat O'Malley as Mrs. Naugatuck and Bert Beasley.
117	24	"The New Maid"	Hal Cooper	Charlie Hauck	April 4, 1977	0524
Maude's new maid is a young West Indian woman whom she initially suspects of stealing her wallet. Guest starring Cliff Norton as the drunk on the bus. Note: First appearance of Marlene Warfield as Victoria Butterfield.

=== Season 6 (1977–78) ===
No. overall	No. in season	Title	Directed by	Written by	Original release date	Prod. code
118	1	"Maude's Guilt Trip"	Hal Cooper	Charlie Hauck	September 12, 1977	0601
Maude weighs her options — to vacation in Rome, or not to vacation in Rome — when a plane purportedly carrying her mother's friend, Aunt Tinkie (Bella Bruck), crashes en route to Tuckahoe days after Tinkie makes Maude a beneficiary on her life insurance policy.
119	2	"Phillip and Sam"	Hal Cooper	Pamela Herbert Chais	September 19, 1977	0603
Maude's new-fashioned ideas are put to the test when Phillip invites a female friend to spend the night. Guest starring Darryl Hickman as Carol's date Andy, Darian Mathias as Phillip's friend Sam, and Jack Dodson as Sam's father. Note: Kraig Metzinger takes over the role of Phillip Trayner from Brian Morrison.
120	3	"The Flying Saucer"	Hal Cooper	S : S.J. Levine; T : Arthur Julian	September 26, 1977	0604
Maude believes she saw a flying saucer. Guest starring Don Beddoe. This was the first episode featuring Richard Kline as Tuggy McKenna.
121	4	"Victoria's Boyfriend"	Hal Cooper	Thad Mumford	October 3, 1977	0605
Victoria's Jamaican father (Roscoe Lee Browne) is not happy she's dating an American Black man.
122	5	"Walter's Temptation"	Hal Cooper	Arthur Julian, Willian Davenport	October 17, 1977	0607
Walter is tempted by his assistant (Marcia Rodd) when she's grateful to him for giving her a raise — on Maude's advice. Guest starring Richard Kline. (Note: Rodd portrayed Carol in the show's pilot episode.)
123	6	"Phillip's Birthday Party"	Hal Cooper	S : Bob Balaban, Lynn Grossman; T : William Davenport	October 31, 1977	0609
A group of teenagers crash Phillip's birthday party.
124	7	"The Doctor's Strike"	Hal Cooper	William Davenport	November 7, 1977	0602
Arthur organizes a doctor's strike just as Walter gets sick.
125	8	"The Ecologist"	Hal Cooper	Arthur Julian	November 14, 1977	0606
Maude has sexual fantasies about an ecologist (Edward Winter) with whom she's working to clean up the Hudson River. Note: This is the only time we see Mrs. Naugatuck's former apartment above the garage used in Season 6; Nell and Bert Beasley moved out near the end of Season 5.
126	9	"The Gay Bar"	Hal Cooper	T : William Davenport, Arthur Julian; S/T : Michael Endler, Thad Mumford	December 3, 1977	0611
Arthur is not happy about a gay bar in town.
127	10	"Businessperson of the Year"	Hal Cooper	Arthur Julian	December 12, 1977	0612
Maude and Walter compete to be Businessperson of the Year.
128	11	"Maude's Christmas Surprise"	Hal Cooper	Arthur Julian, William Davenport	December 19, 1977	0614
Maude finds a baby on her doorstep at Christmastime. Guest starring Tim Reid.
129	12	"Maude's New Client"	Hal Cooper	William Davenport	January 2, 1978	0610
Maude's new real estate client has a connection to the mob. Guest starring Helen Page Camp and Bernard Grant.
130	13	"The Obscene Phone Call"	Anthoney Chickey	Elliot Bernstein	January 16, 1978	0613
Maude changes her phone number to put a stop to the obscene phone calls she's been receiving, but when the calls continue, Maude suspects that the culprit is someone she knows. The second and final appearance of James Cromwell.
131	14	"Musical '78"	Hal Cooper	Arthur Julian, William Davenport	January 28, 1978	0617
Maude holds a TV musical fund raiser to raise money for a disabled former child tap dancer, but learns before the telethon goes on the air that the child is faking her condition.
132	15	"My Husband, the Hero"	Hal Cooper	Sy Rosen	February 4, 1978	0608
Maude is not happy when Walter is declared a hero for saving another person while a restaurant where they were dining goes on fire. Note: This is the final series appearance of Richard Kline as Tuggy McKenna.
133	16	"Maude's Foster Child"	Hal Cooper	Johnny Bonaduce	February 11, 1978	0618
Maude's Ethiopian foster child comes to visit for the first time, thanks to the sponsorship of a local African-American congregation — but when he arrives, Maude discovers he's not quite what any of them expected. Guest starring Moses Gunn.
134	17	"Vivian's Decision"	Hal Cooper	Richard Herlan	February 18, 1978	0619
Vivian considers leaving Arthur when she attends a college reunion and discovers that many of her former classmates and current students are really making a difference in the world. This episode is largely a "two-hander" for Beatrice Arthur and Rue McClanahan.
135	18	"Carol's Dilemma"	Hal Cooper	S : Bob Baublitz, Kevin Hopps; S/T : Melodie Hollander, Michael Walker	February 25, 1978	0615
Carol learns that her ex-husband (Charles Siebert) is about to re-marry and wants custody of Phillip.
136	19	"Arthur's Grandson"	Hal Cooper	Richard Herlan	March 4, 1978	0616
Arthur's grandson (Sparky Marcus) is coming to visit, so Arthur is hoping to patch things up with his son.
137	20	"Mr. Butterfield's Return"	Hal Cooper	Arthur Julian and William Davenport	March 11, 1978	0621
Mr. Butterfield (Roscoe Lee Browne) returns with the intention of taking Victoria back to the West Indies.
138	21	"Phillip's Mature Romance"	Hal Cooper	Arthur Julian, William Davenport	March 25, 1978	0620
Maude discovers that Phillip's girlfriend is four years older than he.
139	22	"Maude's Big Move: Part 1"	Hal Cooper	Dick Herlan	April 8, 1978	0622
At a Chinese dinner party given for her Congresswoman friend, Irene Mackleaney (Mary Louise Wilson), Maude discovers that Carol and Phillip are moving to Colorado; Vivian and Arthur are moving to Idaho; and Irene collapses dead on the floor from a heart attack. Note: Final series appearance of Adrienne Barbeau as Carol Traynor.
140	23	"Maude's Big Move: Part 2"	Hal Cooper	Charlie Hauck	April 15, 1978	0623
Faced with the departure of nearly everyone she loves from her life, Maude sinks into depression only to be lifted by some excellent news — she's been named to succeed her friend, the late Irene Mackleany as Congresswoman. Note: Final series appearances of Conrad Bain and Rue McClanahan as Arthur and Vivian Harmon.
141	24	"Maude's Big Move: Part 3"	Hal Cooper	William Davenport, Charlie Hauck, Arthur Julian, Rod Parker	April 22, 1978	0624
Maude and Walter leave New York for Washington, D.C. to begin a new chapter in their lives.
