= Suzanne Clauser =

American television writer

Suzanne Phillips Clauser (August 25, 1929 - April 11, 2016) was an American television writer. She wrote several award-winning television movies, including The Pride of Jesse Hallam and A Girl Named Sooner which was based on her novel of the same name. Clauser also wrote 11 episodes of the television series, Bonanza and was the only woman to regularly write for the show.

== Biography ==
Clauser was born on August 25, 1929, and grew up in Long Island. Clauser studied literature at Indiana University Bloomington and graduated in 1951. She married Charles Clauser in 1951 and in 1954, when her husband earned a Fulbright Grant to study in Burma and Rangoon, she went with him.

Clauser moved to Yellow Springs, Ohio, when her husband got a job at Wright-Patterson Air Force Base. Once in Yellow Springs, Clauser began to write and soon published a story about their married experiences in Asia. Clauser became interested in a class taught at Antioch College that was taught by Rod Serling, a visiting faculty member. Serling sent one of her scripts to Hollywood and her script was picked up by producers of Bonanza. The first episode that she wrote and was produced was titled "Woman of Fire" and released in 1964. She went on to write 11 Bonanza episodes. Clauser was the only woman to regularly write for Bonanza.

Clauser's television movie, Pioneer Woman, won a 1973 Western Heritage Award from the Cowboy Hall of Fame. Clauser's screen adaptation of her novel of the same name, A Girl Named Sooner, premiered in 1975 at Vevay. It was nominated for a Writers Guild Award. Her adaptation of Little Women showed on NBC in 1978. Her script for the television movie, The Pride of Jesse Hallam won an award for the best original television play in 1981. Christmas Snow (1986) earned the title of best children's program at the 1987 Golden Gate Awards.

While Clauser wrote, she continued to work as a housewife in Yellow Springs. She was part of a writer's group in Yellow Springs that she joined in 1962, and which she felt had strong influence on her writing. She retired from scriptwriting in the 1990s.

Clauser died April 11, 2016, in her home in Yellow Springs.

== Selected filmography ==
- Bonanza (1964–1971)
- Pioneer Woman (1973)
- A Girl Named Sooner (1975)
- Little Women (television 1978)
- The Pride of Jesse Hallam (1981)
- Christmas Snow (1986)

== Selected bibliography ==
- A Girl Named Sooner. New York: Avon Books. 1972. ISBN 9780380002160.
- East of Mandalay: A Novel. Sarasota, Florida: Disc-Us Books. 2000. ISBN 9781584441175.
