= Brenda Vaccaro =

American actress (born 1939)

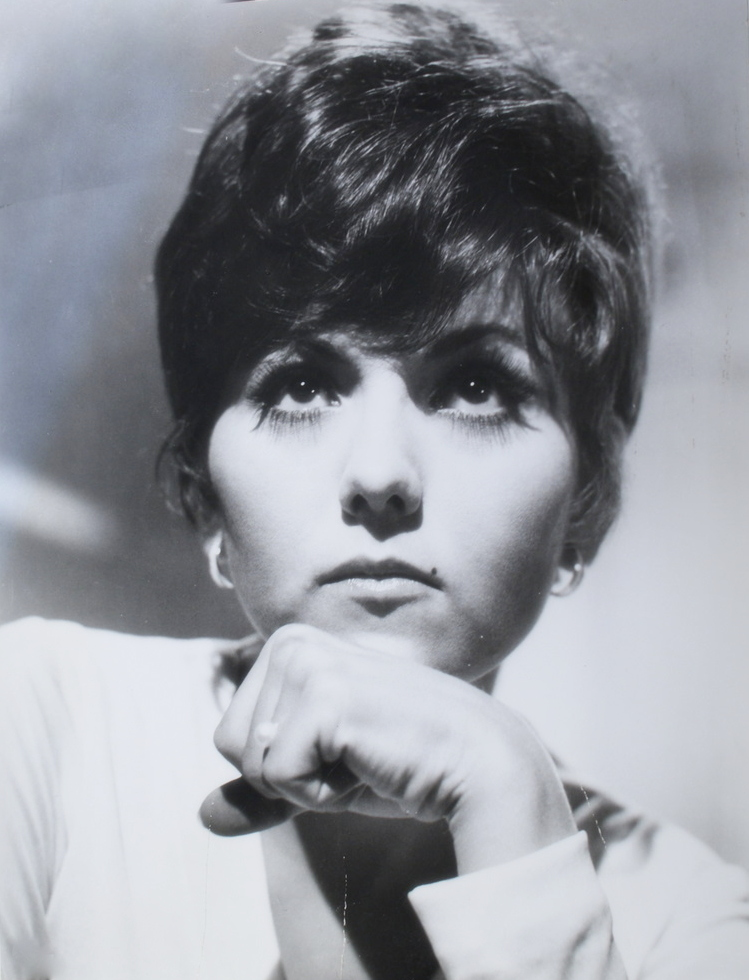
- Vaccaro in Where It's At (1969)
- Born: Brenda Buell Vaccaro; November 18, 1939 (age 86); New York City, New York, U.S.
- Education: Neighborhood Playhouse School of the Theatre
- Occupation: Actress
- Years active: 1961–present
- Spouses: Martin Fried (m. 1965; div. 1970) William Bishop (m. 1977; div. 1978) Charles Cannizzaro (m. 1981; div. 1982) Guy Hector (m. 1986)
- Partner: Michael Douglas (1971–1976)

Brenda Buell Vaccaro (born November 18, 1939) is an American stage, film and television actress. In a career spanning over half a century, she received one Academy Award nomination, three Golden Globe Award nominations (winning one), four Primetime Emmy Award nominations (winning one), and three Tony Award nominations.

== Early life, family and education ==
Vaccaro was born in Brooklyn, New York City, New York, to Italian-American parents Christine M. Pavia and Mario A. Vaccaro, a restaurateur. She was raised in Dallas, Texas, where her parents, in 1943, founded Mario's Restaurant. She attended the Hockaday School in Dallas before graduating from Thomas Jefferson High School in 1958.

At age 17, she returned to New York City to study acting under the guidance of Sanford Meisner at the Neighborhood Playhouse School of the Theatre. She made her Broadway debut in the short-lived 1961 comedy Everybody Loves Opal, for which she won a Theatre World Award.

== Career ==
Vaccaro's Broadway credits include The Affair (1962), Cactus Flower (1965), the musical How Now, Dow Jones (1967), The Goodbye People (1968), the female version of The Odd Couple (1985), and Jake's Women (1992). The husky-voiced actress is a three-time Tony Award nominee, for Best Featured Actress in a Play (Cactus Flower), Best Actress in a Musical (Dow Jones), and Best Actress in a Play (The Goodbye People). She was featured on the May 29, 1970 cover of Life magazine.

Vaccaro appeared with Dustin Hoffman and Jon Voight in the 1969 film Midnight Cowboy, for which she was nominated for a Golden Globe Award for Best Supporting Actress. She played Ethel Rosenberg in Stanley Kramer's Judgment: The Trial of Julius and Ethel Rosenberg in 1974, and for her performance in the 1975 film adaptation of Jacqueline Susann's Once Is Not Enough, she gained an Academy Award nomination and won the Golden Globe for Best Supporting Actress.

Additional screen credits include Airport '77; Capricorn One; The Pride of Jesse Hallam; Supergirl; The Mirror Has Two Faces; Heart of Midnight; Zorro, The Gay Blade; and Death Weekend, also known as The House by the Lake.

Her television credits include the title role in the 1976 series Sara, a number of television movies, and a regular role in the short-lived 1984 series Paper Dolls, in addition to guest appearances on Banacek, The Fugitive, The Defenders, Coronet Blue, The Name of the Game, Marcus Welby, M.D., McCloud, The Streets of San Francisco, The Love Boat, St. Elsewhere, Murder, She Wrote, The Golden Girls, Columbo, Touched by an Angel, Friends (as the mother of Matt LeBlanc's "Joey"), The King of Queens, and Nip/Tuck. She was nominated for an Emmy Award three times and won for Best Supporting Actress in Comedy-Variety, Variety or Music for The Shape of Things in 1974.

Vaccaro was lampooned by Andrea Martin on SCTV for a groundbreaking 1980 commercial appearance for feminine hygiene products.

She supplied the voice for Johnny Bravo's mother Bunny Bravo in the animated cartoon series. She was the first voice of Jay's (Jon Lovitz)'s ex-wife Ardeth on The Critic. She made an appearance on The Smurfs as Scruple, an apprentice of Gargamel, opposite Paul Winchell.

After ill health forced Valerie Harper to bow out of the production of Nice Work If You Can Get It at the Ogunquit Playhouse (Maine), Vaccaro took over the role of Millicent Winter for the remaining performances of the limited run from August 4–15, 2015.

She played Jack Kevorkian's (Al Pacino)'s sister in You Don't Know Jack (2010). She plays Gloria Marquette in the Sex and the City reboot, And Just Like That...

== Personal life ==
She entered a nearly seven-year relationship with Summertree co-star Michael Douglas in 1971. She guest-starred in two episodes of The Streets of San Francisco, the TV crime drama in which Douglas co-starred from 1972 to 1977.

She has been friends with Barbra Streisand since they both appeared on Broadway in the early 1960s. Streisand directed her in The Mirror Has Two Faces.

== Filmography ==
=== Film ===
| Year | Title | Role | Notes |
|---|---|---|---|
| 1969 | Where It's At | Molly Hirsch | |
| 1969 | Midnight Cowboy | Shirley | |
| 1970 | I Love My Wife | Jody Burrows | |
| 1971 | Going Home | Jenny | |
| 1972 | Summertree | Vanetta | |
| 1975 | Once Is Not Enough | Linda Riggs | |
| 1976 | Death Weekend | Diane | Released in the USA under the title The House by the Lake |
| 1977 | Capricorn One | Kay Brubaker | |
| 1977 | Airport '77 | Eve Clayton | |
| 1979 | Fast Charlie... the Moonbeam Rider | Grace Wolf | |
| 1980 | The First Deadly Sin | Monica Gilbert | |
| 1981 | Zorro, The Gay Blade | Florinda | |
| 1984 | Supergirl | Bianca | |
| 1985 | Water | Dolores Thwaites | |
| 1988 | Heart of Midnight | Betty | |
| 1989 | Ten Little Indians | Marion Marshall | |
| 1989 | Cookie | Bunny | |
| 1990 | Lethal Games | Stella Hudson | |
| 1991 | Masque of the Red Death | Elaina Hart | |
| 1994 | Love Affair | Nora Stillman | |
| 1996 | The Mirror Has Two Faces | Doris | |
| 2002 | Sonny | Meg | |
| 2003 | Charlotte's Web 2: Wilbur's Great Adventure | Mrs. Hirsch | Voice |
| 2005 | Boynton Beach Club | Marilyn | |
| 2016 | Kubo and the Two Strings | Kameyo | Voice |
| 2017 | The Clapper | Ida Krumble | |
| 2017 | 30-Love | Hellen | |
| 2019 | Once Upon a Time in Hollywood | Mary Alice Schwarz | |
| 2025 | Burt | Patty Green | |
| 2025 | Nonnas | Antonella | |

=== Television ===
| Year | Title | Role | Notes |
|---|---|---|---|
| 1961 | Naked City | Rosa Alloro | Episode: "The Corpse Ran Down Mulberry Street" |
| 1963 | The Fugitive | Joanne Spencer | Episode: "See Hollywood and Die" |
| 1966 | Vacation Playhouse | Jenny Penny | Episode: "My Lucky Penny" |
| 1969 | The F.B.I. | Gerri Coates, the waitress | Episode: "Scapegoat" |
| 1971 | What's a Nice Girl like You...? | Shirley | ABC Movie of the Week written by Howard Fast and directed by Jerry Paris |
| 1972 | Marcus Welby, M.D. | Marilyn Hoffman | Episode: "House of Mirrors" |
| 1972 | The Streets of San Francisco | Police Officer Sherry Reese | Episode: "Act of Duty" |
| 1972 | McCloud | Police Officer Margaret Sereno | Episode: "The Park Avenue Rustlers" |
| 1972 | Banacek | Sharon Clark | Episode: "To Steal a King" |
| 1973 | Honor Thy Father | Rosalie Bonnano | Television movie |
| 1973 | The Shape of Things | Herself | Television special |
| 1974 | The Streets of San Francisco | Hit Woman Sidney (AKA Sally Banning) | Episode: "The Most Deadly Species" |
| 1974 | Judgment: The Trial of Julius and Ethel Rosenberg | Ethel Rosenberg | TV film directed by Stanley Kramer |
| 1976 | Sara | Sara Yarnell | 12 episodes |
| 1976 | Territorial Men | Sara Yarnell | Television movie – compiled from footage shot for the television series Sara |
| 1977 | Nestor, the Long-Eared Christmas Donkey | Tilly (voice) | Television special |
| 1979 | Dear Detective | Det. Sgt. Kate Hudson | 4 episodes |
| 1980 | Guyana Tragedy: The Story of Jim Jones | Jane Briggs | Television movie |
| 1981 | A Long Way Home | Lillian Jacobs | Television movie |
| 1981 | The Star Maker | Dolores Baker | Television movie |
| 1981 | The Pride of Jesse Hallam | Marion Galucci | Television movie |
| 1983 | Fame | Herself | Episode: "Blood Sweat & Circuits" |
| 1984 | Paper Dolls | Julia Blake | 13 episodes |
| 1984 | St. Elsewhere | Rose Orso | Episode: "The Women" |
| 1984 | The Love Boat | Eleanor Savage | 2 episodes |
| 1984–1989 | The Smurfs | Scruple / various (voice) | 53 episodes |
| 1985 | Deceptions | Helen Adams | Television miniseries |
| 1985 | Care Bears | Auntie Freeze (voice) | 2 episodes; uncredited |
| 1986–1987 | Hollywood Squares | Herself | Episodes airing December 22-26, 1986 & March 9-13, 1987 |
| 1987 | The Jetsons Meet the Flintstones | Didi (voice) | Television movie |
| 1988 | Murder, She Wrote | Mimi Harcourt | Episode: "Just Another Fish Story" |
| 1990 | Murder, She Wrote | Didi Blair | Episode: "The Fixer-Upper" |
| 1990 | Murder, She Wrote | Sheila Kowalski Finley | Episode: "The Family Jewels" |
| 1990 | The Golden Girls | Angela Petrillo | Episode: "Ebbtide's Revenge" |
| 1990 | Columbo | Jess McCurdy | Episode: "Murder in Malibu" |
| 1990 | Stolen: One Husband | Lisa Jarrett | Television movie |
| 1991 | Darkwing Duck | Slim (voice) | Episode: "You Sweat Your Life" |
| 1992 | Civil Wars | Actress | Episode: "Oceans White the Phone" |
| 1992 | Red Shoe Diaries | Martha | Television movie |
| 1992 | Goof Troop | Gilda (voice) | Episode: "Date with Destiny" |
| 1994 | Following Her Heart | Cecile | Television movie |
| 1994 | The Critic | Ardeth (voice) | 5 episodes |
| 1994–1995 | Captain Planet and the Planeteers | Chi / Marge (voice) | 2 episodes |
| 1995 | Friends | Gloria Tribbiani | Episode: "The One with the Boobies" |
| 1996 | Touched by an Angel | Al | Episode: "Out of the Darkness" |
| 1996 | Siegfried & Roy: Masters of the Impossible | (voice) | Unknown episodes |
| 1997 | What a Cartoon! | Melissa (voice) | Episode: "Johnny Bravo and the Amazon Women" |
| 1997 | Ally McBeal | Karen Horowitz | Episode: "The Attitude" |
| 1997–1999 | Spawn | Additional voices | 5 episodes |
| 1997–2004 | Johnny Bravo | Bunny Bravo / various (voice) | 55 episodes |
| 1998 | The King of Queens | Sheila Rednester | Episode: "Paternal Affairs" |
| 2001 | Becker | Bob's Mother | Episode: "The Ghost of Christmas Presents" |
| 2002 | Just a Walk in the Park | Selma Williams | Television movie |
| 2004 | Just Desserts | Lina | Television movie |
| 2005 | American Dad! | Strip Club Manager (voice) | Episode: "Stan Knows Best" |
| 2006 | Nip/Tuck | Beatrice Madsen | Episode: "Diana Lubey" |
| 2006 | The War at Home | Barbara | Episode: "The West Palm Beach Story" |
| 2010 | You Don't Know Jack | Margo Janus | Television movie |
| 2011 | Johnny Bravo Goes to Bollywood | Bunny Bravo (voice) | Television film |
| 2017 | Gypsy | Claire Rogers | 8 episodes |
| 2017 | Superior Donuts | Ellen | Episode: "Get It, Arthur" |
| 2018 | Summer Camp Island | Godmonster (voice) | Episode: "Monster Visit" |
| 2020 | The Boss Baby: Back in Business | Midge Marksberry (voice) | Episode: "Teambuilding" |
| 2021 | And Just Like That... | Gloria Marquette | 2 episodes |

=== Video games ===
| Year | Title | Role | Notes |
|---|---|---|---|
| 2006 | Cartoon Network Racing | Bunny Bravo | |

== Stage ==
| Year | Title | Role(s) | Venue | Notes | Ref. |
|---|---|---|---|---|---|
| 1961 | Everybody Loves Opal | Gloria | Longacre Theatre | Broadway debut | |
| 1962 | The Affair | Laura Howard | Henry Miller's Theater | | |
| 1963 | Children From Their Games | Melissa Peabody | Morosco Theatre | | |
| 1965 | Cactus Flower | Toni | Royale Theatre | Tony Award nomination | |
| 1967 | The Natural Look | Reedy Harris | Longacre Theatre | | |
| 1967 | How Now, Dow Jones | Cynthia | Lunt-Fontanne Theatre | Tony Award nomination | |
| 1968 | The Goodbye People | Nancy Scott | Ethel Barrymore Theatre | Tony Award nomination | |
| 1971 | Father's Day | Louise | John Golden Theatre | | |
| 1985 | The Odd Couple | Olive Madison | Broadhurst Theatre | | |
| 1992 | Jake's Women | Karen | Neil Simon Theatre | | |
| 2015 | Nice Work If You Can Get It | Millicent Winter | Ogunquit Playhouse | | |

== Accolades ==
| Award/association | Year | Category | Nominated work | Result | Ref. |
|---|---|---|---|---|---|
| Academy Awards | 1976 | Best Supporting Actress | Once Is Not Enough | Nominated | |
| Behind the Voice Actors Awards | 2017 | Best Supporting Female Vocal Performance in a Feature Film | Kubo and the Two Strings | Won | |
| Behind the Voice Actors Awards | 2017 | Best Vocal Ensemble in a Feature Film | Kubo and the Two Strings | Won | |
| Golden Globe Awards | 1970 | New Star of the Year – Actress | Where It's At | Nominated | |
| Golden Globe Awards | 1970 | Best Supporting Actress – Motion Picture | Midnight Cowboy | Nominated | |
| Golden Globe Awards | 1976 | Best Supporting Actress – Motion Picture | Once Is Not Enough | Won | |
| Laurel Awards | 1970 | Best Supporting Actress | Midnight Cowboy | Nominated | |
| Los Angeles Italia Film Festival | 2001 | Outstanding Achievement Award | | Won | |
| Online Film & Television Association | 2010 | Best Supporting Actress in a Motion Picture or Miniseries | You Don't Know Jack | Nominated | |
| Primetime Emmy Awards | 1974 | Best Supporting Actress in Comedy - Variety, Variety or Music | The Shape of Things | Won | |
| Primetime Emmy Awards | 1976 | Outstanding Lead Actress in a Drama Series | Sara | Won | |
| Primetime Emmy Awards | 1991 | Outstanding Guest Actress in a Comedy Series | The Golden Girls | Nominated | |
| Primetime Emmy Awards | 2010 | Outstanding Supporting Actress in a Miniseries or Movie | You Don't Know Jack | Nominated | |
| Satellite Awards | 2011 | Best Supporting Actress – Series, Miniseries or Television Film | You Don't Know Jack | Won | |
| Saturn Awards | 1979 | Best Supporting Actress | Capricorn One | Nominated | |
| Sitges Film Festival | 1977 | Best Actress | Death Weekend | Won | |
| Theatre World Awards | 1961 | Best Actress | Everybody Loves Opal | Won | |
| Tony Awards | 1966 | Best Featured Actress in a Play | Cactus Flower | Nominated | |
| Tony Awards | 1968 | Best Actress in a Musical | How Now, Dow Jones | Nominated | |
| Tony Awards | 1969 | Best Actress in a Play | The Goodbye People | Nominated | |
