= Judgment: The Trial of Julius and Ethel Rosenberg =

- Genre: Drama
- Directed by: Lee Bernhardi; Stanley Kramer
- Starring: Allan Arbus; Herschel Bernardi; Brenda Vaccaro; Allen Garfield
- Country of origin: United States
- Original language: English

Production
- Producer: Stanley Kramer
- Running time: 90 minutes
- Production company: Stanley Kramer Productions

Original release
- Network: ABC
- Release: January 28, 1974

Judgment: The Trial of Julius and Ethel Rosenberg is a 1974 American television film. It screened as part of ABC Theater. It was directed by Stanley Kramer and written by Harry Kleiner.

== Cast ==
- Allan Arbus as Julius Rosenberg
- Brenda Vaccaro as Ethel Rosenberg
- Allen Garfield as David Greenglass
- Barbara Colby as Ruth Greenglass
- Harvey Jason as Roy Cohn

== Production ==
It was the first in what was to be three specials for ABC under the title "Judgment" - all would deal with a famous trial. The other two would concern William Calley and Tomoyuki Yamashita. Rehearsals began January 7, 1974. The cast was announced in December 1973.
