= Heart of Midnight (film) =

1988 film by Matthew Chapman

- Heart of Midnight UK VHS cover
- Directed by: Matthew Chapman
- Written by: Matthew Chapman
- Produced by: Andrew Gaty
- Starring: Jennifer Jason Leigh; Peter Coyote; Brenda Vaccaro; Steve Buscemi; Frank Stallone
- Cinematography: Ray Rivas
- Edited by: Penelope Shaw
- Music by: Yanni
- Production companies: Virgin Vision; AG Productions
- Distributed by: The Samuel Goldwyn Company
- Release date: November 10, 1988
- Running time: 93 minutes
- Country: United States
- Language: English
- Budget: $5 million
- Box office: $113,000 (domestic)

Heart of Midnight is an American thriller film written and directed by Matthew Chapman and starring Jennifer Jason Leigh. The story follows a young woman with a troubled past who has a hard time dealing with the reality of her new surroundings. The original soundtrack for the film was composed by Yanni and it marks one of his first major recordings.

== Plot ==
Carol (Jennifer Jason Leigh) is a young woman recovering from her recent, although not the first, nervous breakdown. She has just inherited "Midnight", a defunct nightclub in a now seedy neighborhood, from her mysterious Uncle Fletcher (Sam Schacht). Against the advice of her mother Betty (Brenda Vaccaro) to simply sell the property, Carol not only commits to reopening the club, but moves in as well. As Carol settles in, she discovers oddly designed rooms and whole sections of the building, soon realizing that the club was a brothel, catering to clients with sexually perverted tendencies.

On her first night in the empty club, three men outside the building spot Carol through the window. Watching her change into a dress, the men observe the front door open. Taking it as an open invitation, the three enter the building and find Carol alone. While two of the intruders take turns raping Carol, the third thwarts the attack, and allows Carol to escape. Police arrive, and shoot the one who thwarted the attack.

In the aftermath, the police learn of Carol's psychological history, and begin doubting her version of the events. The police tell Carol that she will be contacted by Lieutenant Sharpe and dismiss her. Shortly after returning to the club, she finds another uninvited man (Peter Coyote) waiting for her. Begging him to tell her that he is Lieutenant Sharpe, he reassures her that he is. He also proves to know much about Fletcher and the club. Although he is more sympathetic than the other police, his revelations of Uncle Fletcher lead to Carol angrily ejecting him from the building. Mysteriously, a bike falls down the steps, nearly hitting him. Soon after the visitor leaves, another arrives - this proves to be the real Lieutenant Sharpe. Speaking with him over the intercom, and not knowing that the visitor is a completely different person, Carol angrily tells him to leave. Sharpe begins to leave, but is then drawn into the building. Following a sound, he enters a room, and is killed off-screen.

The man who identified himself as Lieutenant Sharpe returns, and he sparks a friendship with Carol, who remains oblivious to his impersonation. Over dinner in the club, "Sharpe" tells Carol about himself. He also drugs her. Later, the Police return to the club. Searching, they find two boys hiding in a space in the club, but narrowly miss discovering the corpse of Lieutenant Sharpe. The police are as skeptical as ever to Carol, especially when she describes having dinner with Lieutenant Sharpe, who is married.

Even after the unwelcome intruders leave, mysterious sounds continue to reverberate through the club, while Carol begins experiencing mysterious visions. Coupled with her continuing discovery of hidden spaces in the building, Carol is forced to confront repressed memories of Uncle Fletcher, and the possibility that some of her experiences are more than just memories.

== Cast ==
- Jennifer Jason Leigh as Carol Rivers
- Peter Coyote as Sharpe / Larry
- Brenda Vaccaro as Betty Rivers
- Sam Schacht as Uncle Fletcher
- Jack Hallett as Lawyer
- Nicholas Love as Tom
- James Rebhorn as Richard
- Tico Wells as Henry
- Steve Buscemi as Eddy
- Frank Stallone as Ledray
- Denise Dumont as Mariana
- Gale Mayron as Sonny

== Release ==
Heart of Midnight opened in Los Angeles and New York on Los Angeles March 3, 1989.

== Reception ==
The film received mixed reviews from critics with some praising the filmmaking and acting while others criticized the storytelling. Film critic Roger Ebert of the Chicago Sun-Times awarded the film two and a half stars out of four and proclaimed that "Chapman is a better director than he is a writer" as well as concluding that "I am not sure he knows where he's going with this film, but he gets there in style." Vincent Canby of The New York Times stated that "the dialogue is clumsy and the suspense is nil" and gave his reason for this by explaining that Carol is a "young woman who may or may not be crazy. This gives the director license to be bizarre without having to justify anything." Variety magazine noted in its review that the "performances are strong all around, particularly by Leigh and Vaccaro." Hal Hinson of The Washington Post noted that the storytelling is "haute macabre and hopelessly silly" but, at the same time, admits that "Leigh is a marvel." In spite of the generally agreed upon consensus that the story of the film was flawed, it still won the Best Film award at 1989's Festival de Cine de Sitges.

== See also ==
- Cinema of the United States
- List of American films of 1988
