= A Girl Named Sooner =

- Genre: Drama
- Based on: A Girl Named Sooner by Suzanne Clauser
- Screenplay by: Suzanne Clauser
- Directed by: Delbert Mann
- Starring: Susan Deer; Lee Remick; Richard Crenna; Cloris Leachman; Don Murray
- Music by: Jerry Goldsmith
- Country of origin: United States
- Original language: English

Production
- Executive producer: Frederick H. Brogger
- Producers: Fred Hamilton; James Franciscus
- Production locations: Switzerland County, Indiana; Vevay, Indiana
- Cinematography: Ralph Woolsey
- Editor: Jack W. Holmes
- Running time: 85 minutes
- Production companies: 20th Century Fox Television; Frederick Brogger Associates; Omnibus Productions

Original release
- Network: NBC
- Release: June 18, 1975

A Girl Named Sooner is a 1975 American made-for-television drama film directed by Delbert Mann and based upon Suzanne Clauser's novel of the same name. Clauser also wrote the screenplay.

== Plot ==
The story is set in Vevay, Indiana in the 1930s and revolves around the titular character, Sooner, a girl of unknown parentage who is being raised by an elderly backwoods woman, Old Mam Hawes (Cloris Leachman), who earns a living making illegal moonshine. Hawes takes Sooner into town and attempts to collect foster care funds for raising Sooner, but this brings her worth as a guardian into question with the Sheriff (Don Murray).

Sooner is taken in by a childless couple, Mac and Elizabeth McHenry (Richard Crenna and Lee Remick), in Mac's hopes that having a child in the house will bring Elizabeth out of her depression. Elizabeth begins to form a bond with Sooner. Sooner is excited about the idea of attending the local school, and she is enrolled. After a bumpy start, she becomes comfortable there.

One day Sooner brings home some children from school to show them her pet bird, whom Sooner had with her when she was taken in by the McHenrys. The children ask why the bird doesn't fly and she says that it's because he doesn't want to. The children and Sooner stamp the ground and throw things at the bird to encourage it to fly, but this results in the death of the bird. Elizabeth comes outside to see what the commotion is and is horrified to find the bird dead. Sooner is initially emotionless about this. Elizabeth sends the children away and Sooner to her room.

The next morning Elizabeth awakes to find Sooner gone. Sooner had run back home to Old Mam Hawes during the night, and had dug up and taken the body of the bird with her. Sooner buries the bird near where she had found him, and finally feels remorse. Elizabeth drives out in the country and finds Old Mam Hawes cabin. Sooner is nowhere to be seen and Hawes berates Elizabeth about how much better a guardian she is compared to Elizabeth, and that Sooner is where she should be now.

Some time passes. The McHenrys have a difficult time in their relationship with the loss of Sooner. Sooner continues to live with Old Mam Hawes, who tells her they may move to Florida, where it's "warm all year 'round".

As the annual fair approaches, Jim Seevey (Michael Gross), whom Hawes sells her whiskey to, arrives and says that there will be extra state inspectors at the fair and he will not be able to sell her whiskey bootleg there. Hawes sends Seevy away in a rage and tells Sooner to hook up their old horse William to the cart because they are going to take the whiskey to the fair and sell it themselves. Sooner says that old William cannot handle the load, but Hawes insists anyway.

At the fair, which Sooner has never been to before, Hawes gives Sooner some money – something she had never done before – and tells Sooner to not get lost. As Sooner buys some cotton candy Elizabeth sees her and buys her some more food. They then ride the Ferris wheel together and Sooner gets ill from it. Finally they return to the horse cart and find Hawes there, trying to whip William to move, but William dies from the strain. As Mac attends to William and declares him dead, Sooner acknowledges that William died, just like the bird did.

The Sheriff arrives and threatens to send Old Mam Hawes off. Hawes said she's about had it and will move to Florida. The Sheriff says he'd happily pay to see that happen. Hawes angrily tells Sooner to stay with the McHenrys, but after walking a distance away is shown to be looking back at Sooner. Reunited, Mac, Elizabeth and Sooner go home.

== Cast ==
- Susan Deer – Sooner
- Lee Remick – Elizabeth McHenry
- Richard Crenna – R.J. "Mac" McHenry
- Don Murray – Sheriff Phil Rotteman
- Anne Francis – Selma Goss
- Cloris Leachman – Old Mam Hawes
- Michael Gross – Jim Seevey

== Production ==
The child actress who would play Sooner was found through a talent search of 300 girls which took place in Indiana, Kentucky and Ohio. Fifty girls were chosen for a final audition in Cincinnati, Ohio. 8-year-old Susan Deer of Indianapolis, Indiana was chosen and flown to Hollywood for screen testing and final approval. Her only previous role had been as a chimney sweep with no lines. The movie was to be Deer's only film role, and it is said of anniversaries of the film's production that she remembers almost nothing about filming the movie.

This film was Michael Gross's first television role, as the man who buys whiskey from Mam Hawes. He later went on to fame in 1982 as Steven Keaton on Family Ties.

Taber Cross played a schoolmate of Sooner in an uncredited role. She went on to play other minor, usually uncredited roles in films like 28 Days and shows like True Blood and Breaking Bad.

The film was set and made in the town of Vevay, Indiana and around Switzerland County, Indiana in the summer of 1974. It was the first movie filmed in the area since the 1958 Frank Sinatra film Some Came Running. Filming began the week of July 22, and employed about 75 locals. The fair scenes were filmed at the annual Swiss Wine Festival. The scene where Sooner gets a bath was filmed on a set built in a bowling alley as no local bathrooms were large enough to accommodate a camera.

== Release ==
The film was originally to air on NBC television in January, 1975 but this was pushed back to June 18, 1975. It was recommended by the National Council of Churches and the National Education Association. It was the most-watched primetime show in the United States for the week of its debut.

=== Home video ===
This film has never been officially released on videocassette or DVD.

== Reception ==
Julia Inman of the Indianapolis Star called the film "a gentle, poignant and polished production with small town warmth that doesn't happen very often on television." Bob Williams of the New York Post wrote, "It's a deeply sensitive story with abundant human values".
