= Sara (1976 TV series) =

- Brenda Vaccaro as Sara Yarnell in a promotional photo
- Genre: Western
- Created by: Michael Gleason
- Starring: Brenda Vaccaro
- Opening theme: "Sara's Theme"
- Composer: Lee Holdridge
- Country of origin: United States
- Original language: English
- No. of seasons: 1
- No. of episodes: 12 plus television movie

Production
- Executive producer: George Eckstein
- Producer: Richard Collins
- Running time: 60 minutes
- Production company: Universal Television

Original release
- Network: CBS
- Release: February 13 – May 7, 1976

Sara is a 1976 American Western television series starring Brenda Vaccaro centering on a schoolteacher in Colorado in the 1870s. It aired from February 13 to May 7, 1976 on CBS.

After Sara ended, a television movie, Territorial Men, compiled from footage shot for the weekly series, was broadcast on July 30, 1976.

== Synopsis ==
In the 1870s, young, unmarried schoolteacher Sara Yarnell decides to leave behind her dull, predictable life in Philadelphia, Pennsylvania, and move to the Western frontier, where she can face new challenges. Answering a newspaper advertisement for a schoolteacher, she settles in Independence, Colorado, where she becomes the only teacher in a one-room schoolhouse.

Strong-willed, she fights fiercely against ignorance and prejudice that she encounters in Independence, much to the dismay of some of the more conservative local residents, who had thought they were getting a far more passive schoolteacher. She also believes strongly that education is a necessity and a right – one of her first actions after arriving in Independence is to demand new readers and a new outhouse for the school – putting her at odds with local residents who view it as an unnecessary luxury.

Her stances and actions have differing effects on the various people in her life in Independence. They offend her landlady, Martha Higgins, and draw mixed responses from schoolboard members Emmett Ferguson, Claude Barstow, and George Bailey, who also is a banker in the town. However, her principles and goals receive the approval of the town's newspaper editor, Martin Pope, and of Sara's friend Julia Bailey, who also is George's wife, as well as of Sara's students, which include Martha's daughters Debbie and Emma and George and Julia's son Georgie.

== Cast ==
- Brenda Vaccaro as Sara Yarnell
- Bert Kramer as Emmett Ferguson
- Albert Stratton as Martin Pope
- William Phipps as Claude Barstow
- William Wintersole as George Bailey
- Mariclare Costello as Julia Bailey
- Louise Latham as Martha Higgins
- Kraig Metzinger as Georgie Bailey
- Debbie Lytton as Debbie Higgins
- Hallie Todd as Emma Higgins
- Albert Henderson as Samuel Higgins

== Production ==
Michael Gleason created Sara, and George Eckstein was its executive producer. Richard J. Collins produced the show. Episode directors included William F. Claxton, Lawrence Dobkin, Daniel Haller, Gordon Hessler, Alf Kjellin, Stuart Margolin, Leo Penn, Joseph Pevney, Michael Preece, Jud Taylor, and William Wiard. Writers included Gleason, Pietra Mazza, Robert Pirosh, Katharyn Michaelian Powers, Elizabeth Wilson, and Jerry Ziegman. Lee Holdridge composed the show's theme song, "Sara's Theme."

Sara was based on the novel The Revolt of Sarah Perkins by Marian Cockrell.

Brenda Vaccaro received a Primetime Emmy Award for Outstanding Lead Actress in a Drama Series nomination for her performance in Sara.

== Broadcast history ==
Sara premiered on CBS on February 13, 1976. It drew low ratings and was cancelled after the broadcast of its twelfth episode on May 7, 1976.

On July 30, 1976, CBS broadcast a made-for-television movie, Territorial Men, compiled from footage shot for the weekly series.

== Episodes ==
No.	Title	Original release date
1	"Half-Breed"	February 13, 1976
Embittered by years of conflict with Native Americans, the townspeople refuse to let their children go to school with Hannah, a 10-year-old girl who is half Native-American and wants to join Sara's class. Sara insists that Hannah has a right to an education, and her stance on the issue puts her at odds with the people of the town – even those she views as friends. At first, the other students boycott the class, but Hannah eventually wins them over, and when someone burns down the schoolhouse, Sara holds class outdoors. Sylvia Soares, Jerry Hardin, Bill McKinney, and Michael LeClair guest-star.
2	"Bright Boy"	February 20, 1976
A proud and wealthy man from the East wants Sara to move into his household and serve as a private tutor to his son, Derek. Committed to teaching all of the area's children, Sara declines, but says that Derek is welcome to attend her class. Sara's students dislike Derek, both because he is well-educated and because his father mistreats the employees of a business he owns. Derek must choose between fitting in with them and remaining loyal to his troublesome and unreasonable father. Lance Kerwin, Robert Mandan, Stephen Manley, Jerry Hardin, and Michael LeClair guest-star.
3	"Reprieve"	February 27, 1976
An epidemic strikes Independence while the town's doctor is away. Kathleen Noonan – the daughter of an alcoholic former doctor whose drinking is ruining his relationship with his daughter and interfering with her studies in Sara's class – is Sara's best pupil and the only person in town with any medical knowledge, so she nervously tends to the sick with Sara's encouragement. Jean Rasey, Harry Townes, Richard Dysart, and Joseph V. Perry guest-star.
4	"The Sod House Woman"	March 5, 1976
When Sara tries to get two farmboys to attend her school, she discovers that their reclusive mother is wasting away in an earthen house far from town. Concerned that isolation is not healthy for the woman, Sara talks her into visiting town for the first time in 14 years to attend the unveiling of the town's first piano. The woman turns out to be a person of refinement and elegance, but Sara's interest in her leads to a major upheaval. Inga Swenson, Don Collier, Jeffrey Jones guest-star.
5	"Code of the West"	March 12, 1976
A boy who hates living with his stern uncle decides to run away and steals his employer's horse so that he can search for the father that abandoned him. After he is caught, he faces hanging as a horse thief, and Sara intervenes to try to save him from the gallows. Richard Stanley, Kim Richards, and Ron Soble guest-star.
6	"The Man from Leadville"	March 19, 1976
Angelo Lusco, a dashing dynamite expert from Leadville, Colorado, comes to Independence to blast open a new silver mine in the area. An opera-singing Italian immigrant, he is charming and romantic, and he and Sara soon fall in love, much to the displeasure of the school board. After an explosion during blasting work for the mine triggers a landslide that kills Angelo's friend and nearly kills him, too, Sara becomes deeply concerned about how dangerous his line of work is and he also begins to question his choice of career. Henry Darrow, Joe De Santis, Kevin Hagen, and Raymond Singer guest-star.
7	"When Gentlemen Agree"	March 26, 1976
A wealthy man arrives in Independence from Massachusetts to buy Emmett Ferguson's land, intending to find a wife and settle in the area. He woos Sara. To Sara's amazement, all the other bachelors in town suddenly begin to shower her with gifts as if to keep her out of the hands of the newcomer. Their odd behavior leads Sara to discover that an unwritten agreement exists among the single men of Independence not to begin a romantic relationship with her out of a fear that she will quit teaching if she gets married, leaving the school board with the problem of finding a new teacher to replace her. Sam Groom, Robert Donner, Christian Grey, and Raymond Singer guest-star.
8	"Lady"	April 2, 1976
A woman named Lily Henchard escapes from an insane asylum after being held there for three years based solely on her husband's declaration that she is insane merely because of her outspokenness. After Lily returns home to find that her daughter Cassie – one of Sara's students – is terrified of her and explains to Sara that her husband had her committed merely to get her out of the way, an outraged Sara intervenes to help Lily establish a healthy relationship with Cassie and to prove that Lily is sane before her husband can have her recommitted. Melinda Dillon, Megan Sullivan, John Carter, John Harkins, and Frank Marth guest-star.
9	"The Child Bride"	April 9, 1976
A pupil feels rejected when Sara begins to pay less attention to her. Shannon Terhune, Tom Skerritt, Nora Eckstein, Gaye Nelson, and Ford Rainey guest-star.
10	"The Mountain Man"	April 23, 1976
An illiterate trapper kidnaps Sara and takes her to his mountain hideaway for a purpose she never imagined. Victor French, Larry Ward, and Richard Yniguez guest-star.
11	"The Visit"	April 30, 1976
Sara's brother Sam unexpectedly arrives in Independence from Philadelphia to inform her that his gravely ill wife Louise has been placed in a sanatorium and to ask her to move back East to care for the couple's son and daughter. To entice her to make the move, Sam adds that he will give Sara property left to him by their father. The conflicted Sara must choose between accepting Sam's tempting offer and remaining in Independence to fulfill her deeply felt commitment to educate her students. Peter Donat, Vicki Schreck, Kathy Ritzke, Ted Gehring, and Andy Singer guest-star.
12	"Grandpa's Girl"	May 7, 1976
An old prospector is the only living relative of his 14-year-old granddaughter. He dies, leaving half of his gold mine and custody of the girl to Sara. Sara tries to convince the strong-willed teenager to give up on plans to continue working the mine, but finds that it takes more than a reasonable argument to sway the fiercely independent girl. Kristy McNichol and Albert Henderson guest-star.
TVM	Territorial Men	July 30, 1976
Two of Sara's students complicate her involvement with a cattle ranch operator. Brenda Vaccaro and Sam Groom star. This was a 98-minute television movie created by compiling footage shot for the series.
