= What's a Nice Girl like You...? =

- Written by: Howard Fast
- Directed by: Jerry Paris
- Starring: Brenda Vaccaro; Jack Warden; Roddy McDowall; Jo Anne Worley; Vincent Price; Edmond O'Brien
- Music by: Robert Prince
- Country of origin: United States
- Original language: English

Production
- Producer: Norman Lloyd
- Cinematography: Harry L. Wolf
- Editor: Richard M. Sprague
- Running time: 90 minutes
- Production company: Screen Gems

Original release
- Network: ABC
- Release: December 18, 1971

What's a Nice Girl like You...? is a 1971 American made-for-television drama film. It aired on ABC as an ABC Movie of the Week. The film was directed by Jerry Paris.

== Plot ==
Shirley, a fiery Bronx bombshell, has become the target of kidnappers — though she can't figure out why. The Kidnappers force Shirley to impersonate a socialite in order to bilk a senile old man out of a fortune.

== Cast ==
Actor	Role
Brenda Vaccaro	Shirley
Jack Warden	Lieutenant Burton
Roddy McDowall	Soames
Jo Anne Worley	Cynthia
Vincent Price	Spevin
Edmond O'Brien	Stillman
