= Maude (TV series) =

American television sitcom (1972–1978)

- Genre: Sitcom
- Created by: Norman Lear
- Directed by: Hal Cooper; Various (season 1)
- Starring: Bea Arthur; Bill Macy; Adrienne Barbeau; Conrad Bain; Rue McClanahan; Esther Rolle; Hermione Baddeley; J. Pat O'Malley; Marlene Warfield
- Theme music composer: Alan and Marilyn Bergman; Dave Grusin
- Opening theme: "And Then There's Maude"; Performed by Donny Hathaway
- Country of origin: United States
- Original language: English
- No. of seasons: 6
- No. of episodes: 141 (list of episodes)

Production
- Executive producer: Norman Lear
- Producers: Rod Parker; Bob Weiskopf; Bob Schiller; Charlie Hauck; Gene Marcione
- Production locations: CBS Television City; Hollywood, California; (1972–75); Metromedia Square; Hollywood, California; (1975–78)
- Running time: 30 minutes
- Production company: Tandem Productions

Original release
- Network: CBS
- Release: September 12, 1972 – April 22, 1978

Related
- All in the Family; Good Times; Hanging In; The Jeffersons; Checking In; Archie Bunker's Place; Gloria; 704 Hauser

Maude is an American sitcom created by Norman Lear that aired on CBS from September 12, 1972, to April 22, 1978. A spin-off of All in the Family, the series stars Bea Arthur as Maude Findlay, a politically liberal, middle-aged woman living in suburban Tuckahoe, New York, with Bill Macy as her fourth husband, Walter. The cast also includes Adrienne Barbeau, Conrad Bain, Rue McClanahan, Esther Rolle, Hermione Baddeley, J. Pat O'Malley and Marlene Warfield.

Like Lear's other sitcoms of the period, Maude combined domestic comedy with topical social issues. Scholars have described it as one of the most overtly political American sitcoms of the 1970s, particularly for its treatment of feminism and its engagement with subjects including abortion, alcoholism, domestic violence, mental health, race and sexuality. The series also occasionally departed from the conventional ensemble sitcom format, most notably in episodes centered almost entirely on Maude and Walter and in "The Analyst", in which Arthur was the only performer on screen.

The series was both successful and controversial during its original run. It ranked among television's top-rated programs in its early seasons, and Arthur won the Primetime Emmy Award for Outstanding Lead Actress in a Comedy Series in 1977 for her performance. Later commentators have described Maude as a landmark in feminist television, and its best-known storylines—especially the 1972 abortion episodes "Maude's Dilemma"—have continued to attract critical attention.

Maude also generated a wider franchise. The character Florida Evans was spun off into Good Times, while the series was adapted internationally as the British sitcom Nobody's Perfect and the French sitcom Maguy.

== Premise ==
Set in Tuckahoe, New York, Maude follows Maude Findlay, a middle-aged woman whose outspoken liberal views and strong personality frequently bring her into conflict with her family, friends, and neighbors. Living with her fourth husband, Walter, Maude also shares her home with her divorced daughter Carol and young grandson Phillip. The series focuses on Maude's domestic life and its intersection with the social and political issues of the day.

== Cast and characters ==
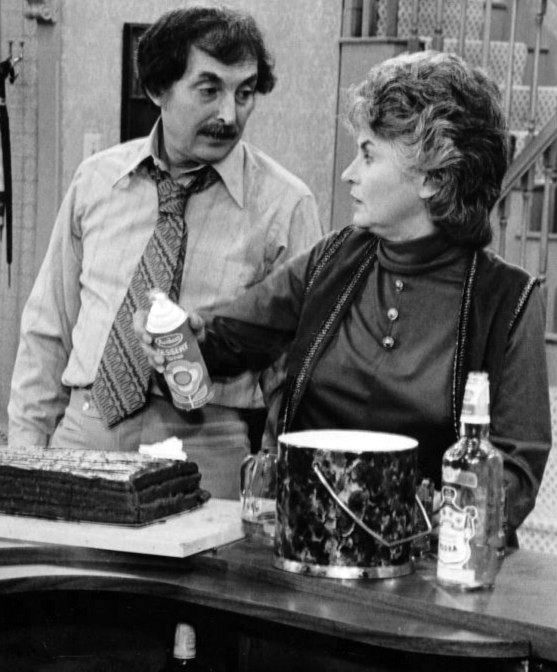
Walter and Maude

Bea Arthur stars as Maude Findlay, a strong-willed suburban housewife who has been married four times and engaged once. Her first husband, Barney, died shortly after their marriage, and she later divorced Albert and Chester. Albert never appeared on screen, although the episode "Poor Albert" revolves around his death, while Chester appeared once, played by Martin Balsam.

Maude's fourth husband, Walter Findlay (Bill Macy), owns an appliance store called Findlay's Friendly Appliances. He and Maude met shortly before the 1968 presidential election. Walter's easygoing manner contrasts with Maude's forceful personality, and their marriage is a frequent source of comedy and conflict. During their arguments, Maude often ends exchanges with her catchphrase, "God'll get you for that, Walter", which came directly from Arthur.

Maude's daughter, Carol Traynor (Adrienne Barbeau), is a divorced single mother who lives with the Findlays along with her young son Phillip. In the All in the Family backdoor pilot, Carol was played by Marcia Rodd. Phillip was played by Brian Morrison during the first five seasons and by Kraig Metzinger in the sixth. Carol dates various men during the early seasons and later forms a serious relationship with Chris, played by Fred Grandy. Like her mother, Carol is outspoken, and the two often clash despite their similar views.

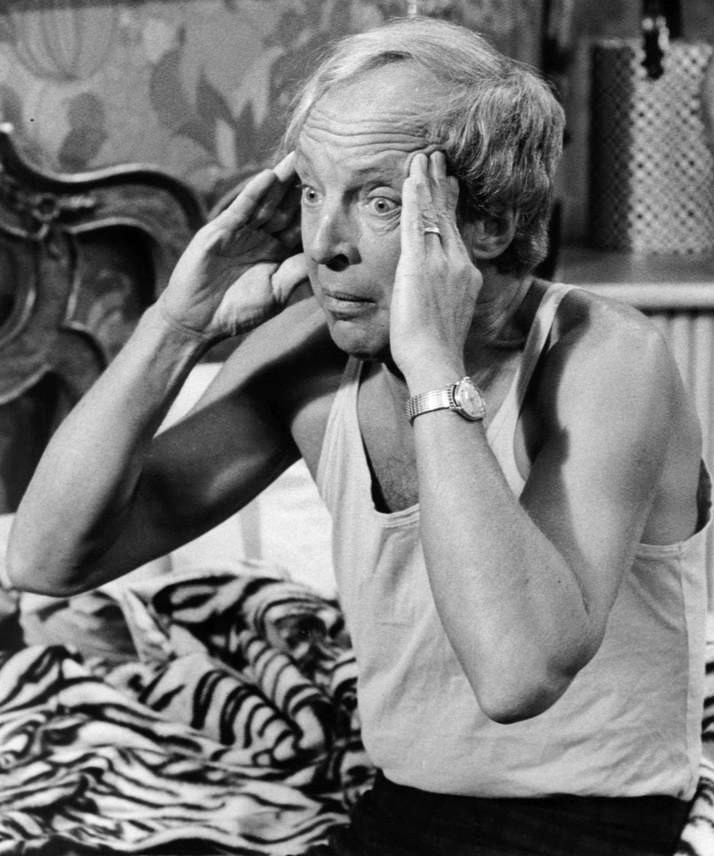
Dr. Arthur Harmon

The Findlays' next-door neighbors are Dr. Arthur Harmon (Conrad Bain) and Vivian Harmon (Rue McClanahan), Maude's closest friend since college, who later marries Arthur during the series. Arthur, a sardonic Republican, is Walter's best friend from their service in World War II. Vivian is gentler and more scatterbrained than Maude. Arthur and Vivian's marriage, like that of Maude and Walter, provides a recurring comic counterpoint within the series.

=== Housekeepers ===
Throughout the series, Maude employs a housekeeper. The first is Florida Evans (Esther Rolle), a no-nonsense Black woman who frequently undercuts Maude's self-conscious attempts to demonstrate her liberalism. Florida's exchanges with Maude became a prominent feature of the early seasons. In the second-season episode "Florida's Goodbye", Florida leaves domestic service after her husband receives a promotion at work.

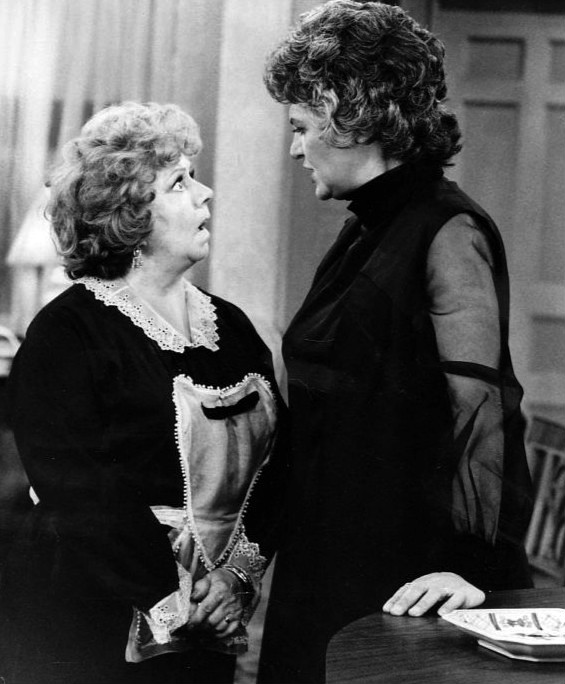
Maude and Mrs. Naugatuck

After Florida's departure in 1974, Maude hires Mrs. Nell Naugatuck (Hermione Baddeley), an elderly British widow who drinks heavily, lies compulsively, and often spars with her employer. Unlike Florida, who commuted to work, Mrs. Naugatuck lives in the Findlay home. She later begins a relationship with Bert Beasley (J. Pat O'Malley), an elderly cemetery security guard, and in 1977 the two marry and move to Ireland to care for Bert's mother.

Maude's final housekeeper is Victoria Butterfield (Marlene Warfield), a native of Saint Norman in the West Indies. Introduced after Maude wrongly accuses her of stealing a wallet on the subway, Victoria remains with the series until its end in 1978, although she appears less frequently than Florida or Mrs. Naugatuck.

== Production ==
=== Development ===
Lear wrote in his memoir that Maude originated from a desire to introduce a character on All in the Family who could challenge Archie Bunker more forcefully than previous antagonists had. He described Edith Bunker's cousin Maude as politically and socially opposite to Archie, making her a natural foil for the character. Lear also recalled that he had admired Bea Arthur since seeing her perform in the 1955 Off-Broadway revue Ben Bagley's Shoestring Revue, and said that the role of Maude was shaped around Arthur's distinctive stage persona, including her voice, physicality, and comic delivery. According to Lear, CBS programming executive Fred Silverman called immediately after Arthur's guest appearance aired and urged that the character receive her own series. Lear added that, within weeks, Rod Parker, Charlie Hauck, Bob Schiller, Bob Weiskopf and Hal Cooper had joined the production team.

Television Academy sources describe the character as having been inspired in part by creator Norman Lear's then-wife, Frances, and as a liberal counterpoint to Archie Bunker.

=== Casting ===
Arthur reprised the role for the spin-off. Lear wrote that Rue McClanahan and Conrad Bain, who played the Findlays' neighbors Vivian and Arthur Harmon, were among the Off-Broadway actors he had known before later bringing them to California. He also identified Adrienne Barbeau and Esther Rolle as key members of the original ensemble. A Television Academy interview with Doris Roberts states that Roberts had initially been offered a regular role on Maude but was dropped before appearing because she was considered too similar to Bea Arthur. Roberts said that the part subsequently went to Rue McClanahan, indicating that the role was Vivian Harmon.

=== Format ===
Although Maude was produced as a conventional sitcom, it occasionally experimented with structure. Television Academy interview materials single out episodes such as "The Convention" and "Maude Bares Her Soul" as especially notable examples. In "The Analyst" (also known as "Maude Bares Her Soul"), Maude speaks to an unseen psychiatrist.

The opening theme song, "And Then There's Maude", featured lyrics by Alan and Marilyn Bergman, music by Dave Grusin, and vocals by Donny Hathaway.

== Episodes ==
Season	Episodes	Originally released		Rank	Rating
Season	Episodes	First released	Last released	Rank	Rating
1	22	September 12, 1972	March 20, 1973	4	24.7
2	24	September 11, 1973	March 5, 1974	6	23.5
3	23	September 9, 1974	March 31, 1975	9	24.9
4	24	September 8, 1975	March 15, 1976	4	25.0
5	24	September 20, 1976	April 4, 1977	31	19.9
6	24	September 12, 1977	April 22, 1978	75	15.2

== Themes and analysis ==
Although Maude was produced as a sitcom, its scripts frequently combined comedy with darker dramatic material and social controversy. The series centered on an outspoken, politically liberal protagonist whose views shaped many of its major storylines. Rather than treating contemporary issues as occasional special episodes, Maude repeatedly incorporated them into its domestic and interpersonal conflicts, making topical debate a defining feature of the series. Later scholars have particularly focused on the series' treatment of feminism and social controversy, and the way it reworked the conventions of the domestic sitcom.

=== Feminism ===
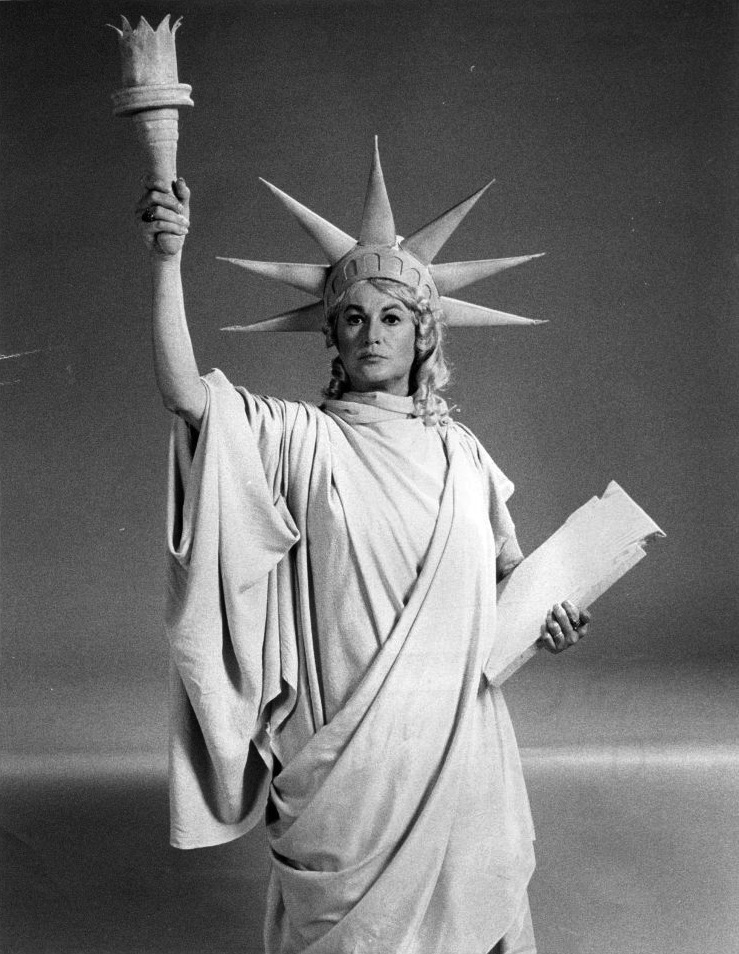
Maude as the Statue of Liberty

Television scholar Amanda D. Lotz has described Maude as "an important exception" among domestic sitcoms, arguing that it featured "some of the most explicitly feminist discourse ever to air in a fictional series". Nicole S. Kypker likewise characterized the series as "unambiguously feminist" and argued that its protagonist's politics were rooted in humanist feminism rather than in the younger, career-oriented model represented by contemporaneous series such as The Mary Tyler Moore Show.

Kypker argued that Maude advanced feminist ideas through the sitcom form itself. In her reading, episodes such as "The Convention" stage a dialectical argument between Maude and Walter, but ultimately validate Maude's position and prompt viewers to "laugh predominantly with Maude" rather than at the values of women's liberation. More broadly, Kypker identifies Maude as the most confrontational of the woman-centered sitcoms she studied, arguing that its explicitly humanist-feminist humor made the protagonist an active maker of jokes rather than simply an object of them.

The series' opening theme song similarly framed Maude in explicitly feminist terms. Kypker wrote that it placed the character "in a lineage of history-making women", while Noel Murray argued that its references to figures such as Betsy Ross, Joan of Arc, Lady Godiva and Isadora Duncan situated the program's arguments about feminism and equality within a longer historical tradition.

=== Topicality and liberal politics ===
Scholars and television historians have described Maude as one of the most overtly political American sitcoms of the 1970s. The Television Academy states that the series helped "explode the dominant values of the white middle-class domestic sitcom" by openly staging debates through its characters on race, class and gender politics, and by confronting issues such as birth control, abortion, alcoholism and depression more directly than earlier domestic comedies had done. Nicole S. Kypker likewise argues that the program's six-season run addressed an unusually wide range of contentious subjects, including alcoholism, drug legislation, domestic violence, depression, attempted suicide and rape, as part of Norman Lear's effort to place "tears and laughter side by side".

This liberal, issue-driven approach was evident across a range of storylines. In the first-season episode "The Grass Story", Maude and her friends protest a harsh sentence for marijuana possession, linking the series to contemporary debates around drug legislation. The 1972 two-part abortion story "Maude's Dilemma", broadcast shortly before Roe v. Wade, became one of the program's most controversial interventions in public debate; when CBS repeated the episodes in August 1973, 39 stations pre-empted the broadcast. A year later, the two-part "Walter's Problem" storyline connected social drinking to alcoholism and domestic violence, and contemporary reviewers praised it for treating the subject seriously despite the sitcom format. Kypker's analysis of the later episode "The Tax Audit" argues that the show also engaged with rape as a feminist issue, though she contends that its treatment remained partially constrained by older, victim-blaming conventions.

The program also linked liberal politics to questions of mental health and masculine authority. The Television Academy notes that later storylines dealt with Walter's depression, while Kypker identifies the character as a "vulnerable patriarch" whose alcoholism, bankruptcy, nervous breakdowns and attempted suicide repeatedly undercut traditional male authority within the domestic sitcom. In this reading, Maude did not simply insert controversial topics into a sitcom framework; it used those issues to test the assumptions of marriage, family life and liberal progressivism itself.

=== Domesticity, class, race and sexuality ===
Although Maude remained set within an upper-middle-class suburban household, scholars and television historians have argued that it used that familiar domestic framework to challenge older sitcom norms. Nicole S. Kypker notes that before Norman Lear's programs, network sitcoms generally centered the concerns of the white middle-class nuclear family and excluded topics such as racism and sexuality from broadcast discourse. The Television Academy similarly states that Maude set out to "explode the dominant values of the white middle-class domestic sitcom" by openly dramatizing political disagreements within the home.

Race and class were often negotiated through the series' household relationships. The Television Academy's overview argues that Maude's early interactions with her Black housekeeper, Florida Evans, exposed the condescension underlying white liberal self-image, with Florida retaining her dignity and refusing to become merely an extension of the Findlay family. Kypker likewise stresses that Maude's feminism was not that of a younger independent worker but of a middle-aged wife whose domestic and class position shaped the program's politics.

Sexuality was another area in which the series pushed beyond earlier domestic comedy. Kypker includes homosexuality among the many contentious issues addressed during the show's run. In The Prime Time Closet: A History of Gays and Lesbians on TV, Stephen Tropiano cites the 1977 episode "The Gay Bar" as an example of the series using comedy to expose homophobia as ignorance. He notes that Arthur Harmon tries to organize "Fathers Against Gay Society", a name whose acronym, "FAGS", is explicitly pointed out by Maude, and argues that the episode repeatedly undercuts Arthur's assumptions through Maude's rebuttals and Phillip's deadpan logic.

== Release ==
=== Broadcast history and Nielsen ratings ===
Maude originally aired on CBS from September 12, 1972, to April 22, 1978. In later years, the series returned to television in reruns, including a run on Antenna TV beginning in 2011.

Season	Time slot (ET)	Rank	Rating
1972–73	Tuesday 8 p.m.	4	24.7
1973–74	Tuesday 8 p.m.	6	23.5
1974–75	Monday 9 p.m.	9	24.9
1975–76	Monday 9:30 p.m.	4	25.0
1976–77	Monday 9 p.m.	30	N/A
1977–78	Monday 9:30 p.m. (Sept.-Nov. 1977); Monday 9 p.m. (Dec.); Saturday 9:30 p.m. (Jan.-Apr. 1978)	75	15.2

=== Home media ===
Sony Pictures Home Entertainment released the first season of Maude on DVD in Region 1 in March 2007. In August 2013, Mill Creek Entertainment acquired rights to distribute various television series from the Sony Pictures library, including Maude, and re-released the first season in February 2015.

In December 2014, Shout! Factory announced that it had acquired the rights to the series and released Maude: The Complete Series on DVD in March 2015. Bonus features included the two All in the Family episodes that introduced Maude, two previously unaired episodes of Maude, a syndicated sales presentation hosted by Norman Lear, and featurettes with interviews involving Adrienne Barbeau, Bill Macy, Bea Arthur, Rue McClanahan, and director Hal Cooper. Shout! Factory later began releasing the individual seasons separately.

== Reception ==
When Maude premiered in 1972, Time ranked it among the fall television season's "top prospects" and suggested that Bea Arthur's performance might do for "liberal suburban matrons" what Archie Bunker had done for "urban hardhats". According to the Television Academy Foundation, the series remained in the Nielsen top ten during its first four seasons despite repeated changes of day and time in the CBS schedule. By 1977, The Washington Post argued that the programme was "coming into its own as one of the best-written and best-acted comedy series on television".

Critics and later commentators have frequently singled out Arthur's performance as central to the series' success. Vanocur credited much of the programme's quality to Arthur, writing that it was "refreshing" to see her "getting better and better with age". In a retrospective assessment for The A.V. Club, Noel Murray wrote that the series "wouldn't have worked without its lead", crediting Arthur's comic timing and her ability to shift between frantic and deadpan delivery. Writing in the Los Angeles Times in 2015, Susan King described Maude as "surprisingly fresh and relevant", highlighting its treatment of taboo subjects while noting that Norman Lear was also willing to satirize liberal assumptions.

The programme's reception was also shaped by its willingness to address contentious issues. In 1977, The Washington Post noted that its treatment of subjects including alcoholism, abortion, homosexuality and death had been as controversial as the themes explored in All in the Family. The two-part abortion storyline "Maude's Dilemma" became the series' most discussed episode; in 1992, the Los Angeles Times called it "a watershed in TV history" that brought "the battle over choice into the prime-time arena". Reflecting on the episode in 2015, Lear told Time that the first broadcast had generated relatively little reaction, and that the strongest backlash came only when the story was repeated in reruns.

== Accolades ==
Year	Award	Category	Nominee(s)	Results	Ref.
1972	Directors Guild of America Awards	Outstanding Directorial Achievement in Comedy Series	Bill Hobin (for "Maude's Dilemma")	Nominated	
1973	Directors Guild of America Awards	Outstanding Directorial Achievement in Comedy Series	Hal Cooper	Nominated	
1975	Directors Guild of America Awards	Outstanding Directorial Achievement in Comedy Series	Hal Cooper	Nominated	
1976	Directors Guild of America Awards	Outstanding Directorial Achievement in Comedy Series	Hal Cooper (for "Vivian's First Funeral")	Nominated	
1972	Golden Globe Awards	Best Television Series – Musical or Comedy		Nominated	
1972	Golden Globe Awards	Best Actress in a Television Series – Musical or Comedy	Bea Arthur	Nominated	
1973	Golden Globe Awards	Best Actress in a Television Series – Musical or Comedy	Bea Arthur	Nominated	
1974	Golden Globe Awards	Best Television Series – Musical or Comedy		Nominated	
1975	Golden Globe Awards	Best Actress in a Television Series – Musical or Comedy	Bea Arthur	Nominated	
1975	Golden Globe Awards	Best Supporting Actress – Television	Hermione Baddeley	Won	
1976	Golden Globe Awards	Best Supporting Actress – Television	Adrienne Barbeau	Nominated	
1977	Golden Globe Awards	Best Actress in a Television Series – Musical or Comedy	Bea Arthur	Nominated	
1998	Online Film & Television Association Awards	Television Hall of Fame: Productions		Inducted	
1973	Primetime Emmy Awards	Outstanding Comedy Series	Norman Lear and Rod Parker	Nominated	
1973	Primetime Emmy Awards	Outstanding New Series	Norman Lear and Rod Parker	Nominated	
1973	Primetime Emmy Awards	Outstanding Lead Actress in a Comedy Series	Bea Arthur	Nominated	
1974	Primetime Emmy Awards	Outstanding Lead Actress in a Comedy Series	Bea Arthur	Nominated	
1976	Primetime Emmy Awards	Outstanding Lead Actress in a Comedy Series	Bea Arthur	Nominated	
1976	Primetime Emmy Awards	Outstanding Directing in a Comedy Series	Hal Cooper (for "The Analyst")	Nominated	
1976	Primetime Emmy Awards	Outstanding Writing in a Comedy Series	Jay Folb (for "The Analyst")	Nominated	
1977	Primetime Emmy Awards	Outstanding Lead Actress in a Comedy Series	Bea Arthur (for "Maude's Desperate Hours")	Won	
1977	Primetime Emmy Awards	Outstanding Art Direction or Scenic Design for a Comedy Series	Chuck Murawski (for "Walter's Crisis: Part 1 & 2")	Nominated	
1978	Primetime Emmy Awards	Outstanding Lead Actress in a Comedy Series	Bea Arthur	Nominated	
1978	Primetime Emmy Awards	Outstanding Directing in a Comedy Series	Hal Cooper (for "Vivian's Decision")	Nominated	
1978	Primetime Emmy Awards	Outstanding Art Direction for a Comedy Series	Chuck Murawski (for "The Wake")	Nominated	
2001	Producers Guild of America Awards	PGA Hall of Fame – Television		Won	
2004	TV Land Awards	Favorite Cantankerous Couple	Bill Macy and Bea Arthur	Nominated	
2004	TV Land Awards	Favorite Made for TV Maid	Esther Rolle	Nominated	
1972	Writers Guild of America Awards	Episodic Comedy	Alan J. Levitt (for "Flashback")	Nominated	
1973	Writers Guild of America Awards	Episodic Comedy	Bob Schiller and Bob Weiskopf (for "Walter's Problem: Part 1 & 2")	Won	

== Legacy ==
In its later assessment of Arthur's career, the Television Academy described Maude Findlay as one of the roles through which Bea Arthur achieved lasting fame.

Later scholarship has also treated Maude as a landmark in the history of feminist television. Amanda D. Lotz described the series as "an important exception" among home-based sitcoms, arguing that it offered "some of the most explicitly feminist discourse ever to air in a fictional series". Nicole S. Kypker likewise identifies Maude as a key 1970s sitcom through which second-wave feminist ideas entered mainstream American television.

The character of Florida Evans proved popular enough to lead to the spin-off series Good Times. In his memoir, Norman Lear wrote that Esther Rolle's performance as Florida had been a "standout" on Maude, and that expanding the character's background eventually led to the development of Good Times. The Television Academy's overview of Good Times likewise describes it as a spin-off of Maude built around Rolle's character.

The series' most controversial storyline, "Maude's Dilemma", continued to attract attention decades after the show's original run. In 2024, a Norman Lear tribute at the ATX TV Festival revisited the abortion episodes as part of a discussion of Lear's cultural legacy, and producer Brent Miller said that a proposed Live in Front of a Studio Audience recreation of the storyline had not been greenlit.

== Adaptations ==
Maude was adapted in the United Kingdom as Nobody's Perfect, which aired on ITV from 1980 to 1982. Starring Elaine Stritch and Richard Griffiths, it ran for two series and 14 episodes. According to the British Film Institute, Stritch adapted 13 original Maude scripts and Griffiths adapted one.

In France, Maude was adapted as Maguy, a long-running sitcom broadcast on Antenne 2 and later France 2 from 1985 to 1994. In 1987, Le Monde described the programme as part of French television's search for a specifically "European" style of popular series production.

== Bibliography ==
- Lear, Norman (September 30, 2014). Even This I Get to Experience. Penguin Group, USA. ISBN 9781101635384.
- Lurie, Karen (2013). "Maude". St. James Encyclopedia of Popular Culture. Gale.
- Kypker, Nicole S. (2020). Women, comedy and liberation: An analysis of representations of second-wave feminism in the American sitcom genre, 1970–2000 (PDF) (PhD thesis). Brunel University London.
- Tropiano, Stephen (2002). The Prime Time Closet: A History of Gays and Lesbians on TV. New York: Applause Theatre & Cinema Books. ISBN 9781557835574.
