= Kraig Metzinger =

American former child actor (born 1963)

Kraig Metzinger (born March 19, 1963) is an American former child actor, who played the role of Maude Findlay's grandson Phillip Traynor on the sitcom Maude for the show's final season in 1977–1978. He was born in Los Angeles, California. Metzinger took over that role from Brian Morrison, who had played the character for the first five seasons.

Prior to Maude, Metzinger was a regular in the cast of the short-lived 1976 CBS series Sara.

== Filmography ==
Film and television
Year	Title	Role	Notes
1976	The Bionic Woman	Joey	Episode: "Welcome Home, Jaime: Part 2"
1976	Sara	Georgie Bailey	Main cast (12 episodes)
1976	Return to Earth	Andy Aldrin	Made-for-TV film
1976	Kenny & Company	Doug's Friend	Feature film
1977–78	Maude	Phillip Traynor	Main cast (10 episodes)
1978	Little House on the Prairie	Denzil McCauley	Episode: "Fagin"
