= Maude's Dilemma =

- Maude episodes
- Episode nos.: Season 1 Episodes 9/10
- Directed by: Bill Hobin
- Story by: Austin Kalish; Irma Kalish
- Teleplay by: Susan Harris
- Original air dates: November 14, 1972 (Part 1); November 21, 1972 (Part 2)

Episode chronology
← Previous "Flashback"	Next → "Maude's Reunion"

"Maude's Dilemma" is a two-part episode in season one of the television show Maude, airing on November 14 and November 21, 1972 on CBS. It is considered a groundbreaking show due to bringing the controversial issue of abortion into people's living rooms and forcing families to confront this open secret.

== Plot ==
Maude discovers that she is pregnant at the age of 47, and struggles to decide whether to have the baby or have an abortion. Her daughter, Carol, encourages an end to the pregnancy; her husband, Walter, insists he will support any choice Maude makes, promising he will have a vasectomy, which he is actually reluctant to do. Ultimately, Maude goes through with having the abortion.

== Development ==
Producer Rod Parker explained: "The funny thing is that initially we weren't even thinking abortion ... The group Zero Population Growth announced they were giving a $10,000 prize for comedies that had something to do with controlling population, so everyone came in with ideas for vasectomies".

Producer Norman Lear decided against a false pregnancy due to it being a cop out; he also decided against having Maude suffer a miscarriage, because that situation had already been done on his other show, All in the Family, to character Gloria Bunker. He decided that given her age, Maude would have realistically had an abortion despite her moral turmoil regarding the subject.

The network was okay with the subject matter due to the success of the show, though asked for the show to present an opposing view; the writers obliged by adding a character who had many children and who was content with their choice.

== Critical reception ==
The Chicago Tribune described this episode as a watershed moment that "brought the battle over choice into the prime-time arena".

== Controversy ==
According to a 1992 Chicago Tribune article

The first showing of "Maude's Dilemma" was carried by all but two of CBS' nearly 200 affiliates and attracted nearly 7,000 letters of protest. By the time the shows were repeated, in August 1973, a campaign against them had been organized by the United States Catholic Conference. The reruns were broadcast, but nearly 40 affiliates chose not to air them, not one corporate sponsor bought commercial time, and CBS received more than 17,000 letters of protest.

— The Chicago Tribune

A 1972 New York Times article noted that two Illinois CBS affiliates, WCIA in Champaign and WMBD-TV in Peoria, refused to air the two-part episode marking the first time any CBS station had refused to run an episode of a continuing series. However, an August 14, 1973, New York Times article published the same day the episode's first summer rerun premiered stated that only 25 CBS affiliates had refused to air the repeat showing.
