= The Pride of Jesse Hallam =

- Genre: Drama
- Written by: Suzanne Clauser
- Directed by: Gary Nelson
- Starring: Johnny Cash; Brenda Vaccaro; Eli Wallach
- Country of origin: United States
- Original language: English

Production
- Executive producer: Frank Konigsberg
- Producer: Sam Manners
- Cinematography: Gayne Rescher
- Editor: Tony de Zarraga
- Running time: 97 minutes
- Production company: The Königsberg Company

Original release
- Network: CBS
- Release: March 3, 1981

The Pride of Jesse Hallam is a 1981 American made-for-television drama film starring Johnny Cash and Brenda Vaccaro. It originally aired March 3, 1981 on CBS.

== Plot ==
Jesse Hallam is a coal miner in Muhlenberg, Kentucky, whose wife has recently died and who has also recently lost his job. His daughter Jenny is in need of an operation on her back, and the nearest hospital that can successfully perform the procedure is in Cincinnati, Ohio. He sells the family farm to his brother-in-law Charlie, receives $15,000 in cash, packs up Jenny and his son Ted, and piles their belongings on a pickup truck as they head to Cincinnati to start a new life.

Upon arrival in Cincinnati, Jesse checks Jenny into the hospital, paying the $14,000 for her operation. After getting Ted registered at Harding High School, Jesse sets out to find work. However, as he is presented with a job application to fill out, he backs off and leaves. His efforts seem futile until he witnesses a vendor trying to cheat an elderly fruit grocer by selling him inferior apples. Jesse intervenes and stops it. The grocer, an Italian immigrant named Sal Galucci (Eli Wallach), offers Jesse a job immediately.

Soon afterwards, Jesse learns his driver's license has expired after he runs a stop sign and is stopped by a police officer. One day, as Jesse is helping Sal set up a stand at a farmer's market, Sal rebukes him for setting their wares on a spot marked with another name. Sal then realizes that Jesse is illiterate. He convinces Jesse to study under Sal's daughter Marian, the principal at Ted's high school.

Meanwhile, Ted is struggling academically, especially with reading. Because of this, he also struggles socially, leading him to associate with a group of wild friends. This culminates in a police officer bringing Ted home to Jesse after Ted consumes alcohol.

Jesse continues to progress well with his reading. Marian offers him a copy of Ernest Hemingway's The Old Man and the Sea, which further inspires Jesse. She suggests a summer reading program at the high school that would bring him to a higher grade level. However, after Jesse fails the written portion of his driver's test, he becomes discouraged and decides to return to Kentucky, which pleases Ted.

After the school year ends, Ted brings home his report card, and when probed by Jesse, Ted says he received an A in gym and a D in math. Jesse learns that Ted flunked out of school...failing all of his other subjects, which require him to know how to read.

The final scene shows Jesse and Ted showing up at the high school for the remedial reading class that Marian had suggested to Jesse earlier. The teacher calls roll, with Jesse and Ted proudly stating 'here' when their names are called.

== Production notes ==
- This movie was filmed entirely on location in Cincinnati, Ohio and rural Kentucky.
- The 1987 made-for-television film Bluffing It, which starred Dennis Weaver, also dealt with adult illiteracy, which was Jesse Hallam's main problem.

== Home media ==
The film was released on DVD in Australia by Flashback Entertainment (Cat 8879). The film was also released in the US as a bonus DVD in a 2 CD album featuring many of Johnny Cash's greatest hits.
