= Rollerball =

Rollerball may refer to:

- Rollerball pen, a type of ballpoint pen and ink
- Roller ball (pointing device), a trackball-device invented by Ralph Benjamin
- Rollerball (1975 film), a science fiction film based on the short story "Rollerball Murder"
- Rollerball (2002 film), a remake of the 1975 film
- Rollerball (video game), a 1988 pinball-themed video game for the NES
- Rollerball (band), an Australian band
- Rollerball (chess variant), a chess variant by Jean-Louis Cazaux, inspired by the film
- "Rollerball", a song by Scottish band Mogwai from the 1998 EP No Education = No Future (Fuck the Curfew)
- Rollerball, a brand of inline skates that have ball-shaped wheels.
- Mark Rocco, an English retired professional wrestler who competed under the ring name "Rollerball"

== See also ==
- Roller derby
