= Rick Rivera =

Rick Rivera may refer to:

- Rick Rivera, character in Maging Akin Ka Lamang
- Rick Rivera, character on List of Marcus Welby, M.D. episodes
