= Rocketball =

1985 video game

- Developer(s): IJK Software
- Publisher(s): IJK Software
- Platform(s): Commodore 64
- Release: 1985
- Genre(s): Sports
- Mode(s): Single-player, multiplayer

Rocketball is a sports-action Commodore 64 computer game released by IJK Software in 1985. Rocketball was coded by John Sinclair and has music by L Pilling. Rocketball is based on the futuristic sports movie Rollerball, released in 1975, starring James Caan. Rocketball's taglines were, "The rules are, there are no rules", and "This was never meant to be a game."

== Gameplay ==
Rocketball is set in the year 2010 AD, where worldwide disputes are no longer settled through wars, but through a circular Rocket Ball arena.

The game is similar to Roller Derby in that two teams on roller skates travel counter-clockwise around a banked, circular track. The object of the game is to score points by throwing a softball-sized metal ball into a cone-shaped goal target inset into the wall of the arena. Balls are fired into play, in the same direction players skate, by cannons when play begins and to restart play after the ball rolls out of play or a goal is scored. Players can use fists, elbows and knees to disable their opponents.

Each Rocketball team has five active players on roller skates. Unlike the film, there are no players riding motorcycles. The four Rocketball teams are Houston (wearing blue), Tokyo (yellow), Moscow (burgundy) and Madrid (Green), which correspond to futuristic city states. (The teams Houston, Tokyo and Madrid also featured in the Rollerball film.)

Games have a duration of ten minutes.

== Packaging ==
Rocketball came in a Single Cassette Case. It boasted super-smooth scrolling, being written in 100% machine code, and a shadow on the ball.

== See also ==
- Killerball
