= Barbara Trentham =

American actress (1944–2013)

- Born: Barbara Lynn Schilling; August 27, 1944; New York City, U.S.
- Died: August 2, 2013 (aged 68); Chicago, Illinois, U.S.
- Education: Mount Holyoke College
- Occupations: Actress; model
- Years active: 1972–1982
- Spouses: Giles Trentham (m. 1967; div. 1970) John Cleese (m. 1981; div. 1990) George Covington (m. 1998)
- Children: 1

Barbara Trentham (born Barbara Lynn Schilling; August 27, 1944 – August 2, 2013) was an American model and actress. In the early 1970s, her photo appeared on many prominent magazine covers, including the British edition of Vogue. As an actress, she starred in the 1975 film Rollerball, and had supporting roles in numerous other 1970s films. Trentham was married to actor-comedian John Cleese.

== Early life ==
Trentham, who was born Barbara Lynn Schilling in 1944 in the Brooklyn borough of New York City, moved with her parents as a child to Connecticut. She attended Mount Holyoke College in South Hadley, Massachusetts, from which she graduated in 1966 and then moved to England to study at the University of Oxford. At Oxford she met fellow student Giles Trentham; they married in 1967 and she retained his name after their divorce in 1970.

== Career ==
In the early 1970s, Trentham worked as a model in London. Her photo appeared several times on the cover pages of British magazines including Seventeen and Vogue.

In 1972 she landed a supporting role in the horror thriller The Possession of Joel Delaney. She then moved to Los Angeles to pursue her acting career. She starred in the science fiction film Rollerball in 1975. In 1976 she performed in the action drama Sky Riders and had a cameo in the British-German television series The Girl from Outer Space. In 1978, she appeared in the produced-for-television horror film Death Moon and 1979 in an episode of the adventure series A Man Called Sloane.

== Personal life ==
In 1980, while working in Los Angeles as a reporter and producer of Those Amazing Animals, she met English actor and comedian John Cleese at a Monty Python performance. They married in 1981; their daughter Camilla was born in 1984. In 1987, the couple separated and three years later they divorced.

During her marriage to Cleese her love for art was reawakened and she began a third career as a painter, her preferred medium being oil paint. In 1993 she moved to Chicago, where she met the lawyer George Covington. The two married in 1998 and lived in Lake Bluff, Illinois. She built up an art studio which became the meeting place and source of inspiration for local artists. She was also co-founder of Artists on the Bluff, a non-profit organization for artists. She was a member of the Art Association of Jackson Hole, and organized events and art fairs there. From watercolor and acrylic to oil painting, Trentham produced pieces featuring both figures and landscapes.

== Death ==
Barbara Trentham died on August 2, 2013, at Northwestern Memorial Hospital in Chicago, aged 68, from complications from leukemia.

== Selected filmography ==
- 1972: The Possession of Joel Delaney – Sherry
- 1975: Rollerball – Daphne
- 1976: Sky Riders – Della
- 1976: The Girl from Outer Space (Star Maidens) (TV series, one episode) – Theda
- 1978: Wolf Moon (Death Moon) (TV movie) – Diane May
- 1979: A Man Called Sloane (TV series, one episode) – Reporter (final television appearance)
