= Killerball =

1991 video game

- Developer: Microids
- Publisher: Microids
- Platforms: Atari ST, Amiga, Amstrad CPC, MS-DOS
- Release: 1991
- Genres: Action, sports
- Modes: Single-player, multiplayer

Killerball is a video game about a futuristic sport published by Microïds in 1989 which blends American football with roller-skating, similar to the 1975 film Rollerball. This violent game is played in a circular rink where each 5-man team tries to score by putting the ball into the hole of the opposing team on the opposite sides of the track. Taking the ball from an opponent can only be done by knocking him down.

== Gameplay ==
Killerball has a training mode where the player competes against another player or the computer in a single exhibition game and a league mode in which the player picks 1 of the 8 Killerball teams and battles through an entire season until they reach the championship game. League mode can also be played with another player.

There are three leagues that affect the rules and gameplay of Killerball that can be selected in both training and league game modes:

Minor league: There are no inflicted injuries on both teams no matter how hard the players hit or tackle the opposing player and the team with the most scoring points against the opposing team wins the game.

Major league: Both teams must win by either scoring the most goals or optionally injuring the entire opposing team, If a killerball player is injured in the game they are replaced by a substitute player, which are limited.

Elite league: There is no time limit; one of the teams just has to survive and injure all the opposing team's skaters to win the game, no matter how many goals both teams scored.

== Reception ==
Reception

Review score
Publication	Score
Aktueller Software Markt	2/12 (Amiga, Atari ST, PC)

== See also ==
- Rocketball
