= Kingston: Confidential =

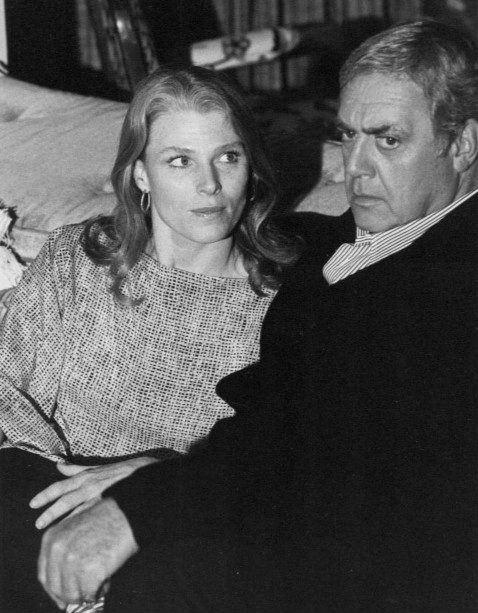
- Raymond Burr and Mariette Hartley in the show premiere.
- Genre: Mystery; Crime drama
- Starring: Raymond Burr
- Composers: Henry Mancini (theme); Pete Rugolo; Richard Shores
- Country of origin: United States
- Original language: English
- No. of seasons: 1
- No. of episodes: 13

Production
- Executive producer: David Victor
- Producers: Joe L. Cramer; James G. Hirsch; Don Ingalls; Don Nicholl; David J. O'Connell
- Running time: 60 mins.

Original release
- Network: NBC
- Release: March 23 – August 10, 1977

Kingston: Confidential is an American mystery crime drama that aired on NBC for 13 episodes during the spring of 1977, following the success of a 1976 made-for-TV movie entitled Kingston. The series was produced by R.B. Productions, Inc. and Groverton Productions, Inc. in association with Universal Television.

== Synopsis ==
The series starred Raymond Burr as R.B Kingston, a powerful media magnate similar to William Randolph Hearst, who owns numerous newspapers and TV stations. In his spare time, he and a group of his employees solve crimes. Co-starring in the series were Art Hindle, Pamela Hensley, and Linda Galloway.

== Cast ==
- Raymond Burr as R.B. Kingston
- Art Hindle as Tony Martin
- Pamela Hensley as Beth Kelly

== Episodes ==
No.	Title	Directed by	Written by	Original release date
TV–movie	"Kingston"	Robert Day	Story by : David Victor & Dick Nelson; Teleplay by : Dick Nelson	September 15, 1976
1	"Shadow Game"	Christian I. Nyby II	Richard Fielder	March 23, 1977
2	"Eight Columns Across the Top"	Joseph Pevney	Story by : Tom Greene; Teleplay by : Richard Fielder	March 30, 1977
3	"Seed of Corruption"	Harvey Laidman	Don Ingalls	April 6, 1977
4	"Triple Exposure"	Christian I. Nyby II	Tom Greene & David Jacobs	April 13, 1977
5	"The Boston Shamrock"	Don Weis	David H. Balkan	June 1, 1977
6	"The Rage at Hannibal"	Don Weis	Eugene Price	June 8, 1977
7	"Golden Girl"	Mike Caffey	Story by : Robert Seizer & Robert Swanson; Teleplay by : Nicholas J. Corea	June 15, 1977
8	"Welcome to Paradise"	Raymond Modor	Nicholas J. Corea	June 22, 1977
9	"Monolith"	Joseph Pevney	Nicholas J. Corea	July 6, 1977
10	"The Cult"	Don Weis	Karl & Terrence Tunberg	July 13, 1977
11	"Dateline: Fear City"	Daniel Haller	Charles Sailor	July 20, 1977
12	"The Night Scene"	Don McDougall	Larry Alexander	August 3, 1977
13	"The Anonymous Hero"	Raymond Burr	David Jacobs	August 10, 1977
