= List of Marcus Welby, M.D. episodes =

This is a list of episodes for the television series Marcus Welby, M.D.

== Series overview ==
Season	Episodes	Originally released	
Season	Episodes	First released	Last released
Pilot		March 26, 1969	
1	26	September 23, 1969	April 14, 1970
2	24	September 22, 1970	March 30, 1971
3	24	September 14, 1971	March 14, 1972
4	24	September 12, 1972	March 6, 1973
5	24	September 11, 1973	March 12, 1974
6	24	September 10, 1974	March 11, 1975
7	24	September 9, 1975	May 4, 1976
TV films		May 16, 1984	December 19, 1988

== Episodes ==
=== Pilot (1969) ===
Title	Directed by	Written by	Original release date
"A Matter of Humanities"	David Lowell Rich	S : David Victor; T : Don Mankiewicz	March 26, 1969
Marcus Welby hires brash young Doctor Kiley to assist in his bustling general practice. Among Welby's most pressing cases is a young man suffering from aphasia whose wife is seeking to have him committed to an institution.

=== Season 1 (1969–1970) ===
No. overall	No. in season	Title	Directed by	Written by	Original release date
1	1	"Hello Goodbye Hello"	Marc Daniels	Jerry De Bono	September 23, 1969
Miss Ruth Adams (Susan Clark) is a wonderful teacher, very engaged with and loved by her children. So when she slaps one of them in a fit of rage, her principal sends her to see Dr. Welby for a psychiatric reference. But her problem is not psychiatric; it is a gliosarcoma, inoperable—a death sentence for a young teacher just beginning her life and career. Dr. Kiley must break the news to her, and then finds himself increasingly drawn into the woman's final days.
2	2	"The Foal"	Daniel Petrie	T : Robert Collins; S/T : Joe Gerrald, Jane Mackenzie	September 30, 1969
Welby fights bureaucratic pressure from a young couple (Lynn Carlin and Steve Ihnat) and an unfeeling psychologist (Robert Ellenstein) as he tries to help the couple's seven-year-old autistic, severely withdrawn son learn how to communicate.
3	3	"Don't Ignore the Miracles"	Leo Penn	Ted Aspin	October 7, 1969
Claire (Julie Adams) visits Dr. Welby certain she has begun to enter menopause, only to discover that at age 42 she has finally become pregnant. Her husband Paul (William Sylvester) was about to leave her for Maggie, a younger woman he has been seeing. A baby seems to be the last thing they want, and Clair considers and almost has an abortion. Delivery is likely to be difficult and Dr. Welby even mentions the possibility of a "defective baby". This episode tells the story of how the older couple learns to cope, and hopefully will learn to love their new child.
4	4	"Silken Threads and Silver Hooks"	John Erman	John H. Bloch	October 14, 1969
A husband starts filming a documentary on his actress-wife's recovery from a stroke, despite warnings from Dr. Welby.
5	5	"All Flags Flying"	Don McDougall	Ken Trevey	October 21, 1969
Captain Rick Ballinger (Henry Wilcoxon), retired Naval hero, has finally finished building his boat, and now plans to sail it back to the places he visited during his military service, bringing with him his son Sailor. But his shortness of breath, cough and numbness of the hands suggest that may not be a good idea. Dr. Welby discovers from a blood examination that he suffers from pernicious anemia—a treatable disease if he is willing to follow a doctor's advice. Unfortunately, his pride goads him into making poor decisions that might cost him and his son their lives.
6	6	"Echo of a Baby's Laugh"	John Erman	Max Hodge	October 28, 1969
Dr. Welby helps a young, pregnant woman (Belinda Montgomery) come to terms with her past—namely, a past relationship she had concealed from her husband (Richard Thomas). Her previous pregnancy was ended by abortion, after she developed complications late in her third trimester. When Welby tells the husband about his wife's past (she was just a teenager when she was pregnant before), the man is furious and wants to leave his wife, but Welby sets him straight.
7	7	"The White Cane"	Leo Penn	Jerome Ross	November 4, 1969
When an operation restores Paul Hannan's (Cliff Potts) sight, his love cools for his blind fiancee, Laura Jelliffe (Carrie Snodgress). Laura, employed at the Center for the Blind, seeks to forestall the ordeal of the engagement being called off by asking for a transfer to another city. Larry Linville guest stars.
8	8	"The Vrahnas Demon"	Richard Benedict	John Vlahos	November 11, 1969
Nick Eugenides is an aging but lusty Greek American fisherman (Frank Silvera) who refuses to change his lifestyle when Dr. Welby informs him he has emphysema. Eugenedes insists on entering an annual deep diving competition, an event he has won for many years.
9	9	"Madonna with Knapsack and Flute"	Philip Leacock	Paul Schneider	November 18, 1969
Myra Sherwood (Anne Baxter), with whom Dr. Welby is in love, takes a pregnant, unmarried "flower child", Tracy Clifford (Darleen Carr), into her home. Dr. Welby, who is treating Tracy for mononucleosis, warns Myra against deep emotional involvement with the girl. Myra, however, whose own daughter would have been Tracy's age had she lived, plans to support Tracy when she has her child—indefinitely.
10	10	"Homecoming"	Daniel Petrie	Robert Collins, David Victor	November 25, 1969
A young man named Scott Behrman (Robert Lipton), who has recently quit using LSD, bursts into Dr. Welby's clinic in a stupor. An after-effect of his withdrawal of the drug (which he started using to deal with family pressures and the death of his mother), Behrman will suffer several more of these "acid flashbacks"—the tipoff to Welby that the young man may need more serious intervention to help completely heal him. However, Welby has to deal with Behrman's stubborn father who believes that, given a job with the family's warehousing business and a little love, the attacks will go away.
11	11	"Let Ernest Come Over"	Marc Daniels	Lionel E. Siegel	December 9, 1969
Ernest Jackson (Percy Rodriguez)—up for promotion to police lieutenant—feels that disclosure of his physical problem would ruin his chance for advancement. Welby, learning of Jackson's occupation, says he cannot allow the truth to be hidden since his condition may lead to the officer's inability to carry out his duty at a crucial moment.
12	12	"The Chemistry of Hope"	Richard Benedict	Jerry McNeely	December 16, 1969
The parents of Pancho McGuerney (Barry Williams) refuse to allow Dr. Welby to tell their teen-aged son that he has leukemia.
13	13	"Neither Punch nor Judy"	Józef Lejtes	Charles E. Israel	December 23, 1969
Dr. Welby's friend, Father Hugh Riorden (Earl Holliman), suffers severe asthmatic attacks because he feels inadequate in dealing with the personal problems of his parishioners. The priest's feelings reach a climax when he is unable to restore the will to live in a young man injured in an accident, but Dr. Welby is able to do so. Father Hugh announces to Dr. Welby that he is going to quit the priesthood.
14	14	"Diagnosis: Fear"	Chris Christenberry	Margaret Arman	December 30, 1969
A basketball player, told by Dr. Welby that he must have knee surgery, goes to a psychic healer instead. Ruth Roman and Stuart Nisbet guest star.
15	15	"The Soft Phrase of Peace"	Russ Mayberry	S : Robert Collins; T : Sandy Stern	January 6, 1970
Dr. Welby treats a black community-leader's college-student son, injured by police during a demonstration. Robert Guillaume guest stars.
16	16	"Fun and Games and Michael Ambrose"	Daniel Petrie	Robert L. Collins	January 13, 1970
Michael Ambrose (David Cassidy), a diabetic, tries to end his life to get even with his father. Michael resents his father, best-selling novelist John Ambrose (John McMartin), blaming him for the unhappiness his mother suffered before her death, and taunts him by threatening to give up taking his insulin shots. When John Ambrose goes back East for a television appearance, Michael carries out his threat. Joanna Cameron and Judith McConnell guest star.
17	17	"The Legacy"	Daniel Petrie	John T. Dugan	January 27, 1970
When patrician Señora Carlotta, mother of Dr. Welby's nurse Consuelo Lopez, is told by the doctor that her life-or-death decision will also involve others, she decides immediately what course she must take. Her philosophy affects Mrs. Faris, the cynical woman whose room she shares and who rejects the present while dreading the future. Guest star Dolores del Río.
18	18	"Dance to No Music"	Jeannot Szwarc	Paul Schneider	February 3, 1970
A newly married man (Joseph Campanella) asks Dr. Welby to perform a vasectomy. The man believes he has Huntington's Chorea and fears passing the disease down to his children. Welby and Kiley calm the heartbroken wife (Joan Darling) while attempting to confirm the diagnosis. Celia Lovsky and George Barrows guest star.
19	19	"Go Get 'Em, Tiger"	Marc Daniels	Don Mankiewicz	February 10, 1970
While visiting a drug rehab clinic, Dr. Kiley is shocked to see that one of its patients is Mr. Chambers (Jack Albertson), who once owned an auto repair shop and gave Kiley his first job to save money to attend college. Chambers' life fell apart after his daughter died in a car accident. He lost his business, became addicted to heroin, turned to crime to support his habit and served time in prison. Kiley is determined to help Chambers get his life back on track, but he runs into unexpected difficulties.
20	20	"Nobody Wants a Fat Jockey"	John Erman	Ken Trevey	February 17, 1970
Dinty Gallagher (Michael Burns), a professional jockey, refuses to give up his regimen of diet pills and steam baths, even after having fainting spells. Gallagher's desperate attempts to make the weight for the most important race of his life result in physical collapse and he is hospitalized. There he overhears Doctors Welby and Kiley tell his manager that tests indicate he is still growing, at 21, and that it will be impossible for him to continue his career as a jockey. With Jennifer Gan and Strother Martin.
21	21	"The Other Side of the Chart"	Herbert Kenwith	S : Alvin Saplinsley; T : Ken Trevey	February 24, 1970
Kiley undergoes a bout with chicken pox, and the young physician deals with an oil field worker who worries over the prospect of having bladder cancer.
22	22	"The Merely Syndrome"	Philip Leacock	Jerry McNeely	March 3, 1970
A young, recently married woman who has undergone successful heart surgery continues to have severe heart seizures.
23	23	"Sea of Security"	Chris Christenberry	Ben Masselink	March 10, 1970
An oceanographer diagnosed with caisson disease (a.k.a. "the bends") insists on one last dive, despite Dr. Welby's warnings that just one dive might kill him.
24	24	"The Daredevil Gesture"	Steven Spielberg	Jerome Ross	March 17, 1970
A teenager with hemophilia, risks his life to rescue a companion who has fallen down a ravine.
25	25	"Enid"	Herschel Daugherty	David Moessinger	March 24, 1970
An orphanage counselor (Flora Plumb), addicted to pills, causes an automobile accident in which one of her charges is injured.
26	26	"The Rebel Doctor"	John Erman	Lionel E. Siegel	April 14, 1970
Dr. Welby tries to help a very young doctor fighting to keep a clinic operating in a poor neighborhood.

=== Season 2 (1970–1971) ===
No. overall	No. in season	Title	Directed by	Written by	Original release date
27	1	"A Very Special Sailfish"	Leo Penn	Jerry McNeely	September 22, 1970
Cathy Cullen (Lee Purcell), a pretty, formerly obese high school senior, comes out of her shell after a successful weight-loss diet. Shedding her former wallflower self, Cathy quickly becomes popular with boys... maybe too popular, as she soon contracts a venereal disease. Dr. Welby presses for answers as Cathy continually resists treatment and refuses to reveal from whom she may have contracted VD. Cloris Leachman and William Schallert star as the Cullen parents.
28	2	"The Worth of a Man"	Leo Penn	Don Ingalls	September 29, 1970
A brilliant trial attorney named Corday (Gary Merrill)—an old Navy friend of Welby's—refuses to interrupt a landmark case for treatment of cancerous lymph nodes. Corday's stubbornness rubs off on his junior partner, who also has health issues of his own... and it may cost them much more than a judgment in their favor.
29	3	"Warn the World About Mike"	Herschel Daugherty	Jerry McNeely	October 6, 1970
Dr. Kiley's brother (Barry Brown) believes he is dying and refuses to seek help.
30	4	"Epidemic"	Daniel Petrie	Jerome Ross	October 13, 1970
The efforts of Welby and Kiley to battle a flu epidemic are complicated by a rich hypochondriac.
31	5	"To Get Through the Night"	Marc Daniels	Charles A. McDaniel	October 20, 1970
A psychiatrist discovers he has a fatal form of sclerosis.
32	6	"Daisy in the Shadows"	Marc Daniels	Paul Schneider, Margaret Schneider	October 27, 1970
The mother of an intellectually-disabled child is forced to realize that she must allow the child to live with foster parents. Suzanne Pleshette and David Hartman guest star.
33	7	"The Labyrinth"	Józef Lejtes	Paul Schneider, Margaret Schneider	November 10, 1970
Scientist Rick Rivera (Ricardo Montalbán) suffers from the physical and psychological after-effects of ingesting hallucinogenic drugs during a trip to Mexico. It is up to Dr. Welby to help Rivera cope and force him off the drugs.
34	8	"The Girl from Rainbow Beach"	Marc Daniels	Edward DeBlasio	November 17, 1970
Just before her marriage, a young woman (Tiffany Bolling) discovers she has a form of leprosy.
35	9	"Aura to a New Tomorrow"	Jeannot Szwarc	John Considine	November 24, 1970
A young man's effort to hide his epilepsy endangers his life.
36	10	"Sounding Brass"	Marc Daniels	John Vlahos	December 1, 1970
A proud young father refuses to bring his supposedly intellectually disabled son to a free clinic for treatment.
37	11	"To Carry the Sun in a Golden Cup"	Philip Leacock	Don Ingalls	December 8, 1970
Dr. Welby suspects a young nurse (Mariette Hartley) has a hereditary muscular disease.
38	12	"All the Golden Dandelions Are Gone"	Leo Penn	Max Hodge	December 15, 1970
A father with mononucleosis endangers his life by not following Welby's advice. Richard Thomas guest stars as Dennis Graham, Belinda Montgomery as Mary Ann Graham, and Rodolfo Hoyos Jr., as Jose Chavez.
39	13	"Brave on a Mountain Top"	Chris Christenberry	Jerome Ross	December 22, 1970
Dr. Welby urges a young Native American (James Farentino) with emphysema to return to the clean air of the reservation.
40	14	"Another Buckle for Wesley Hill"	Robert L. Collins	Robert L. Collins	January 5, 1971
A man who prided himself on his physical condition and active life (Glenn Corbett) must come to terms with the fact that his illness will eventually mean the complete loss of his independence.
41	15	"False Spring"	Russ Mayberry	Joseph Stefano	January 19, 1971
Kiley falls for a married woman (Dana Wynter) who has been diagnosed with tuberculosis, after realizing that the woman's husband (Robert Lansing) is emotionally distant with her. Getting the man to come to terms with his wife's condition and realize the seriousness of it uncovers some deep-seated secrets of his past.
42	16	"A Passing of Torches"	Jeannot Szwarc	S : Martin Donaldson; S/T : Ken Trevey	January 26, 1971
A dying former teacher and a confused medical student complicate efforts to honor the educator.
43	17	"A Woman's Place"	Leo Penn	Charles A. McDaniel	February 2, 1971
Dr. Welby tries to help an alcoholic orthopedic surgeon.
44	18	"A Spanish Saying I Made Up"	Jeannot Szwarc	Theodore Apstein	February 16, 1971
Dr. Welby's nurse falls in love with a rich man (Joseph Campanella) with old-fashioned principles.
45	19	"Cynthia"	Herschel Daugherty	David Moessinger	February 23, 1971
Despite repeated warnings by Kiley and Welby, a young woman insists on surgery to cure her paralysis. When the doctors stand firm, she sues them for malpractice, hoping to proceed with the surgery. Instead, secrets about her strained relationship with her estranged father rise to the surface. Guest star Randolph Mantooth.
46	20	"Don't Kid a Kidder"	Daniel Petrie	Adrian Spies	March 2, 1971
Problems occur after Dr. Welby helps a blind woman arrange plastic surgery for her big-eared son.
47	21	"Elegy for a Mad Dog"	Russ Mayberry	Ken Trevey	March 9, 1971
Dr. Welby is bitten by a rabid dog which belongs to an intellectually disabled patient of his. Christina Crawford guest stars.
48	22	"The Contract"	Chris Christenberry	Paul Schneider, Margaret Schneider	March 16, 1971
Dr. Welby becomes involved in a strained marriage when he assists the wife of a musician who becomes ill on a flight to Los Angeles.
49	23	"The Windfall"	Herschel Daugherty	Paul West	March 23, 1971
A young girl (Laurie Prange) develops an ulcer because she feels her rich parents do not love her.
50	24	"The House of Alquist"	Robert L. Collins	David Moessinger	March 30, 1971
Dr. Welby urges a young woman to break with her despotic father and marry the man she loves. Alexander Scourby and Jessica Walter guest star.

=== Season 3 (1971–1972) ===
No. overall	No. in season	Title	Directed by	Written by	Original release date
51	1	"The Tender Comrade"	David Lowell Rich	Edward DeBlasio	September 14, 1971
The marriage plans of a beautiful widow (Diana Muldaur) are threatened when she undergoes a mastectomy.
52	2	"A Portrait of Debbie"	Arnold Laven	David Moessinger	September 21, 1971
Dr. Welby faces a puzzling diagnostic problem with a young girl (Pamelyn Ferdin) who is newly adopted.
53	3	"In My Father's House"	Marc Daniels	Charles A. McDaniel	September 28, 1971
When his father (Alan Hale Jr.) suffers a stroke, Dr. Kiley faces a life-or-death decision.
54	4	"I Can Hardly Tell You Apart"	Leo Penn	Joanne Court	October 5, 1971
In a dual role, Sally Field plays identical twins June and Jan Wilkins, between whom exists a very strong sibling rivalry. Jan's feelings are put to a test when June's burns require a skin graft.
55	5	"This Is Max"	Marc Daniels	David Victor	October 12, 1971
Dr. Welby helps a Japanese-American boy achieve a change in attitude toward his father.
56	6	"Men Who Care: Part 1"	Marc Daniels	Jerry McNeely	October 19, 1971
The father of one of Dr. Welby's patients is charged with murdering his daughter's boyfriend, so Welby asks lawyer Owen Marshall (Arthur Hill) to defend the man. Lee Majors, Ed Nelson and Belinda Montgomery guest star.
57	7	"Ask Me Again Tomorrow"	David Lowell Rich	Robert Sabaroff	October 26, 1971
A neurosurgeon (William Windom) jeopardizes his career when he pushes himself beyond his endurance.
58	8	"Don't Phase Me Out"	Leo Penn	Theodore Apstein	November 2, 1971
A heart attack makes a work-oriented executive reexamine his values. Joseph Campanella, Jacqueline Scott and Darrell Larson guest star.
59	9	"Echo from Another World"	Marc Daniels	Michael Gleason	November 9, 1971
The life of a patient is endangered by a young neurologist's diagnostic error. Dorothy Lamour and Ted Bessell star.
60	10	"The Best Is Yet to Be"	Bruce Kessler	David Victor	November 16, 1971
Romance blossoms between two elderly residents of a plush retirement home.
61	11	"A Yellow Bird"	Jeannot Szwarc	Pat Fielder	November 23, 1971
Dr. Welby's nurse wants to compensate for her lonely life by adopting a child. Christopher Stone and Marcia Ralston guest star.
62	12	"They Grow Up"	Jeannot Szwarc	Dick Nelson	November 30, 1971
Dr. Welby helps a young instructor face the unconscious guilt he feels about his mentally-challenged sister (Sian Barbara Allen).
63	13	"Of Magic Shadow Shapes"	Leo Penn	Ken Trevey	December 7, 1971
A once-renowned film director (Barry Sullivan) endangers his life when given a chance to regain his fame.
64	14	"Cross-Match"	Marc Daniels	Jerome Ross	December 14, 1971
A bitter young black man gets a new idea of life when he gives his blood to save a white boy. Michael Warren and Johnny Whitaker guest star.
65	15	"The Basic Moment: Part 1"	Marc Daniels	Jerry McNeely	January 4, 1972
Dr. Welby's daughter returns from South America wishing for an abortion because of exposure to rubella.
66	16	"The Basic Moment: Part 2"	Marc Daniels	Jerry McNeely	January 11, 1972
Complications which arise following the birth of Dr. Welby's grandson threaten the mother's life.
67	17	"All the Pretty People"	Bruce Kessler	David Victor	January 25, 1972
Rick Metaxas (Nico Minardos), whose tennis prowess has brought him fame, money and a beautiful wife, is hospitalized by Dr. Kiley following a collapse. Faced with the fact that his tennis playing days are over, Rick thinks his life is over as well until a suggestion for a new career comes from a teammate.
68	18	"I'm Really Trying"	Leo Penn	Margaret Schneider, Paul Schneider	February 1, 1972
The problems of a boy with minimal brain dysfunction are aggravated by his father's refusal to accept the diagnosis. Gary Collins guest stars.
69	19	"Is It So Soon That I Am Done for—I Wonder What I Was Begun For?"	Jeannot Szwarc	Margaret Schneider, Paul Schneider	February 8, 1972
After their infant son dies, grief-stricken parents take in a foster child. Michael Callan, Sallie Shockley and Jerry Fogel guest star.
70	20	"Just a Little Courage"	Marc Daniels	Jerry de Bono	February 15, 1972
Dr. Welby helps a college instructor (David McCallum) realize that he must return to his first love of writing.
71	21	"Don't Talk About Darkness"	David Alexander	John Wilder	February 22, 1972
A man requiring eye surgery postpones it so that he may see his first child.
72	22	"Once There Was a Bantu Prince"	Bruce Kessler	David Victor	February 29, 1972
A social worker with sickle cell anemia wants to adopt a child suffering from the same disease. Felton Perry and Juanita Moore guest star.
73	23	"A Taste of Salt"	Robert L. Collins	Robert L. Collins	March 7, 1972
The long-time marriage of a couple is threatened when their newborn son develops cystic fibrosis. Charles Aidman and Anne Jackson guest star.
74	24	"Solomon's Choice"	Marc Daniels	Max Hodge	March 14, 1972
Teenager Carol Lockett (Lee Purcell), three months pregnant and hospitalized by an infection, chooses to risk going full term rather than having a therapeutic abortion. Another complication is deciding whether to marry the baby's father or to put the child up for adoption. Guest star Randolph Mantooth.

=== Season 4 (1972–1973) ===
No. overall	No. in season	Title	Directed by	Written by	Original release date
75	1	"A Fragile Possession"	Harry Falk	Margaret Schneider; Paul Schneider	September 12, 1972
The physical and emotional dangers of abortion surface when a domineering mother forces her daughter to undergo the operation. Joanna Cameron and Beverly Garland guest star.
76	2	"Love Is When They Say They Need You"	Marc Daniels	David Victor	September 19, 1972
A mentally challenged man faces the problem of being a transplant donor to his brother. Bruce Davison and Mike Farrell guest star.
77	3	"We'll Walk Out of Here Together"	Leo Penn	S : Gwyneth Ferguson Matthews; T : Edward DeBlasio	September 26, 1972
An active young girl (Sian Barbara Allen) must adjust to a lifetime in a wheelchair following a serious illness. With Jennifer Gan.
78	4	"In Sickness and in Health"	Herschel Daugherty	Jerry Ziegman	October 3, 1972
A newly separated wife contracts a venereal disease when she has an affair. Kaz Garas and Cathy Lee Crosby guest star.
79	5	"House of Mirrors"	Leo Penn	Joanna Lee	October 10, 1972
Just as he plans to remarry, a pathologist (Patrick O'Neal) is told he faces serious surgery.
80	6	"He Could Sell Iceboxes to Eskimos"	Hollingsworth Morse	Adrian Spies	October 17, 1972
Dr. Welby takes on the case of a real estate salesman who has a stroke on an airplane just before it lands in Southern California. Feeling the man needs family support in addition to the care and therapy he is getting in the hospital, Dr. Welby tries to get his estranged wife and daughter to visit him. Marion Ross, Sharon Farrell, Agnes Moorehead and Jack Haley guest star.
81	7	"The Wednesday Game"	Herschel Daugherty	Paul Petersen, Edward DeBlasio	October 24, 1972
A lonely girl and her brother strike up a friendship with a cancer-stricken athlete. Radames Pera and Katherine Justice guest star.
82	8	"Don and Denise"	Herschel Daugherty	Jerry de Bono	October 31, 1972
A young pianist-composer and his wife face an uncertain future after she is stricken with multiple sclerosis. Lindsay Wagner guest stars.
83	9	"Please Don't Send Flowers"	Arnold Laven	Bess Boyle	November 14, 1972
A young housewife and mother of two falls into a deep depression after learning she has uterine cancer. Susan Clark guest stars.
84	10	"With a Shout, Not a Whimper"	Marc Daniels	Peter S. Fischer	November 21, 1972
Even though he thinks so, an aging surgeon (Leif Erickson) soon discovers that his life is not over even though he can no longer practice.
85	11	"Jason Be Nimble, Jason Be Quick"	David Moessinger	David Moessinger	November 28, 1972
A father learns he has a responsibility to his young son who is stricken with rheumatoid arthritis. Lee Montgomery and James Stacy guest star.
86	12	"Unto the Next Generation"	Russ Mayberry	Jerome Ross	December 5, 1972
Young parents are afraid to have another child after losing their first baby to the fatal genetic condition, Tay–Sachs disease. Jess Walton guest stars.
87	13	"Heartbeat for Yesterday"	Earl Bellamy	Robert Sabaroff	December 12, 1972
Dr. Welby—called by flying physician Jerome Billings (William Shatner), an orthopedic surgeon, for help—finds young Carlos in a diabetic coma. Carlos's grandfather, Charlie (Chief Dan George), convinced his grandson will die, objects to Welby's treating him but accompanies Carlos when Welby insists on flying the ailing youth to a hospital. Weather forces the plane into an emergency landing in which Charlie is injured, giving Welby two emergencies to handle.
88	14	"Dinner of Herbs"	Herschel Daugherty	Edward DeBlasio	December 19, 1972
A problem-plagued overweight wife goes on a crash diet to save her marriage. Fionnula Flanagan and Sharon Gless guest star.
89	15	"A More Exciting Case"	Richard Benedict	Norman Hudis	January 2, 1973
Following a hysterectomy, a nurse returns to work and becomes over-involved with a patient. Robert Walker Jr. and Jessica Walter guest star.
90	16	"A Necessary End"	Leo Penn	Norman Hudis	January 9, 1973
When Julie Langley Kirk (Anne Baxter) is diagnosed by Dr. Welby as having serious heart damage, she refuses to accept it at first. Convinced finally by Dr. Welby that she must continue her work, she works on, with the help of her assistant Greta (Susan Howard), finishing a moving photographic essay on the end of life.
91	17	"Who Are You Arthur Kolinski?"	Philip Leacock	Peter S. Fischer	January 16, 1973
A grandfather, his son and his grandson learn to respect each other when illness draws them together. Peter Mark Richman and Nehemiah Persoff guest star.
92	18	"Gemini Descending"	Marc Daniels	Robert Malcolm Young	January 23, 1973
An aggressive salesman (James Coco) undergoes a personality change caused by a rare disease.
93	19	"The Problem with Charlie"	Leo Penn	Peter S. Fischer	January 30, 1973
An aspiring student attorney stricken with a stress-related ulcer resists efforts by Welby, Kiley and his wife to help him. Greg Mullavey, Jackie Coogan, Elaine Giftos and Ike Jones guest star.
94	20	"Catch a Ring That Isn't There"	Leo Penn	Margaret Schneider; Paul Schneider	February 6, 1973
Teenage gymnast champion Richie Manning (Jan-Michael Vincent) falls off the rings in gym class, the tip-off that he has a serious drinking problem. Welby and Kiley refer Richie to the Comeback House to help him come to terms with his alcoholism. Compounding matters is the fact that Richie's parents (Norman Fell and Gloria DeHaven)—dry-cleaning-store owners who are still grieving the death of their older son—are in denial over the whole thing.
95	21	"The Working Heart"	Joseph Pevney	Anthony Lawrence	February 13, 1973
Laura Daniels (Joanna Barnes) develops a serious heart problem as the result of rheumatic fever. Although she accepts Dr. Welby's order to give up her TV interview show, she is convinced that her husband Paul (Donnelly Rhodes) loves her only as a successful career woman. She returns to work, getting pills from her assistant Jan (Kristina Holland), and these, combined with liquor, cause her to collapse, making heart surgery mandatory.
96	22	"The Other Martin Loring"	Allen Reisner	Dick Nelson	February 20, 1973
The emotional strain of an impending divorce sends a man (Mark Miller) into a diabetic coma. Note: This episode generated controversy for equating homosexuality with moral illness.
97	23	"The Day After Forever"	Marc Daniels	Richard Fielder	February 27, 1973
Sally Ann Howes plays a housewife involved with a political campaign, which quickly turns personal when she catches the eye of the charming young candidate (Lyle Waggoner). The woman's contractor husband (Pernell Roberts) quickly becomes fraught with worry about his marriage and develops a dependence on tranquilizers.
98	24	"The Tortoise Dance"	Joseph Pevney	Dick Nelson	March 6, 1973
A secretly depressed high-school boy (Darrell Larson) becomes suicidal after the senseless death of his friend. Janet Blair and Darleen Carr guest star.

=== Season 5 (1973–1974) ===
No. overall	No. in season	Title	Directed by	Written by	Original release date
99	1	"The Panic Path"	Marc Daniels	David Victor	September 11, 1973
An impotent husband (Paul Burke) tries to find an extramarital relationship. Vera Miles guest stars.
100	2	"A Joyful Song"	Unknown	David Victor	September 18, 1973
A young woman dying of leukemia takes a special interest in a blind boy who wants to be an artist. Radames Pera guest stars.
101	3	"For Services Rendered"	Marc Daniels	Jerome Ross	September 25, 1973
Coronary bypass surgery may be the only thing that can save the life of dry-cleaning store operator Fred Pulaski (Tige Andrews). But Pulaski, determined to retire with his wife (Kim Hunter) to a ranch in Southern California, is determined not to have the surgery—he does not have health insurance or savings to fund both the surgery and the ranch—and instead keeps his health a secret.
102	4	"Blood Kin"	Joseph Pevney	Charles A. McDaniel	October 2, 1973
Rico and Louisa Renati (Sonny Bono and Suzanne Charny), aware their frail but lively daughter Maria has the rare Cooley's Anemia (peculiar to Italians), refuse the operation suggested by Dr. Welby. However, Dr. Jed Hartnett (Lawrence Pressman), a leading specialist in this type of disease who is ready to quit the profession, becomes intrigued with Maria and decides to fight her parents' decision.
103	5	"The Light at the Threshold"	Joseph Pevney	Margaret Schneider; Paul Schneider	October 9, 1973
Tracey Robbins (Audrey Landers) has been plagued with diabetes for years and the disease has caused her to slowly lose her sight due to blood vessel malfunction. When her father fails to take her on a promised trip to Europe and her infatuation with Dr. Kiley undergoes a rude awakening, the girl becomes withdrawn and refuses the operation. Carol Lawrence, Gordon Pinsent and Rodney Allen Rippy guest star.
104	6	"A Question of Fault"	Hollingsworth Morse	Lee Oscar Bloomgarden	October 16, 1973
When a little boy develops gangrene, his condition is blamed on incompetent medical care. Barbara Luna, Jed Allan, Lou Frizzell, Marion Ross, Kathryn Reynolds and Frank Aletter guest star.
105	7	"Friends in High Places"	Marc Daniels	Jerry de Bono	October 23, 1973
An actor's lie about a starring role to cheer up his dying father backfires. Frank Langella and Jerry Fogel guest star.
106	8	"The Endless Moment"	Hollingsworth Morse	Richard Milton; Art Sarno	October 30, 1973
Fearing that his bride-to-be, Kelly Green (Stefanie Powers), will cancel their marriage plans, Dr. Kiley does not tell her the seriousness of the rheumatic disorder she has contracted. Dr. Welby disagrees with his associate and, as her doctor, tells her the eventualities of such an illness when she insists on knowing.
107	9	"The Tall Tree"	Unknown	David Victor	November 6, 1973
A psychiatric therapist learns he has a serious illness which will complicate his ability to work. Susan Howard and Sharon Gless guest star.
108	10	"The Circles of Shame"	Philip Leacock	Hesper Anderson	November 20, 1973
Welby is puzzled when a young woman and bride-to-be being treated for an ulcer tries to give herself an abortion, unaware that she is trying to conceal the fact that a co-worker had raped her. Leslie Charleson, Paul Sorensen and Barbara Baxley guest star. Cameo by Tom Hayden.
109	11	"Nguyen"	David Moessinger	David Moessinger	November 27, 1973
An ex-Marine adopts a Vietnamese orphan who becomes ill. Robert Hooks and Juanita Moore guest star.
110	12	"A Cry in the Night"	Philip Leacock	Richard Fielder	December 11, 1973
A marine biologist (Dina Merrill) refuses to admit she is seriously ill, until she blacks out during an underwater dive.
111	13	"Death Is Only a Side Effect"	Jerry London	S : Robert van Scoyk; T : Jerome Ross	December 18, 1973
Patricia Lowry (Lynne Marta)—despondent over her chronic kidney disease and fearful that her husband (Robert Urich) is having romantic affairs on his business trips—takes a tranquilizer that puts her in a coma.
112	14	"The Comeback"	Unknown	David Victor	January 1, 1974
Dr. Welby forces a former alcoholic to fight for reinstatement as a surgeon. Marian McCargo guest stars.
113	15	"A Full Life"	Nicholas Colasanto	Lee Oscar Bloomgarden	January 8, 1974
A scientist (Richard Basehart) is stricken with malaria and then learns that his grandson has not chosen to follow in his footsteps. Murray MacLeod and Phyllis Thaxter guest star.
114	16	"No Charity for the MacAllisters"	Russ Mayberry	R. Wright Campbell	January 15, 1974
While treating a boy for a snakebite, Dr. Kiley discovers the child has a hereditary blood disease. Edd Byrnes and R. G. Armstrong guest star.
115	17	"Each Day a Miracle"	Leo Penn	Hesper Anderson	January 22, 1974
A girl (Ronne Troup), whose remission from leukemia is the longest on the record books, enrolls in college against her father's wishes.
116	18	"The Fear of Silence"	Randal Kleiser	Robert Malcolm Young	January 29, 1974
An air traffic controller is plunged into moments of hopelessness when it is discovered there are lesions on his larynx. Christopher Connelly and Gretchen Corbett guest star.
117	19	"Angela's Nightmare"	Leo Penn	Richard Fielder	February 5, 1974
A 15-year-old girl (Mary Maldonado) runs away after being raped by the same man who wants to adopt her. Abbey Lincoln guest stars.
118	20	"The Mugging"	Marc Daniels	David Victor	February 12, 1974
A husband, in the fear that his wife may be mugged again, shoots a neighbor. Jim Hutton and Lorraine Gary guest star.
119	21	"The Latch-Key Child"	Unknown	David Victor	February 19, 1974
A four-year-old boy, left in the care of his nine-year-old sister, suffers from recurrent blackouts. Marcia Strassman guest stars.
120	22	"Out of Control"	Joseph Pevney	Margaret Schneider; Paul Schneider	February 26, 1974
A racing driver, preparing his car for his last big chance, suffers from major brain damage. George Maharis guest stars.
121	23	"I've Promised You a Father: Part 1 & Part 2"	Hollingsworth Morse	Hesper Anderson	March 5, 1974
A young nurse, suffering from a rare genetic disease that can cause delusions, names Dr. Kiley as the father of her small son in a paternity suit, so Owen Marshall (Arthur Hill) is hired to defend him. Lynda Day George, Kim Darby and Farrah Fawcett guest star.
122	25	"Designs"	Unknown	David Victor	March 12, 1974
A fashion designer, suffering from nervous fatigue, becomes emotionally involved with Dr. Welby. Jane Wyatt and Mel Ferrer guest star.

=== Season 6 (1974–1975) ===
No. overall	No. in season	Title	Directed by	Written by	Original release date
123	1	"The Brittle Warrior"	Richard Learman	Judy Burns	September 10, 1974
A veteran police sergeant (and new grandfather) tries to hide the debilitating effects of arthritis from his superior officers... in particular, his son-in-law. Forrest Tucker and Sharon Gless guest star.
124	2	"The Faith of Childish Things"	William Asher	Jean Holloway	September 17, 1974
An expectant mother with diabetes flies cross-country and falls into a coma.
125	3	"Last Flight to Babylon"	Jerry London	Edward DeBlasio	September 24, 1974
After treatment for bladder cancer, Len Dalton (Cliff DeYoung) is unable to secure a position as a pilot; fearful of losing the affections of his girlfriend and suffering from post-operation depression, he contemplates suicide. After visiting Dr. Welby for a checkup, Dalton tries to persuade Consuelo to give him some sleeping pills. When his pleading fails, he obtains the drug from another source and tries to end his mental anguish forever. Jim Backus and June Lockhart guest star.
126	4	"To Father a Child"	Randal Kleiser	T : Jean Holloway; S/T : Larry Alexander	October 1, 1974
Dr. Welby counsels a couple on the problems of impotency. Diane Baker and Ron Ely guest star.
127	5	"The Outrage"	Bernard McEveety	Eugene Price	October 8, 1974
Welby gets a high school student, raped by his homosexual pedophile teacher, to reveal the identity of his assailant.
128	6	"The Fatal Challenge"	Richard Learman	Stephen Kandel	October 15, 1974
A patient almost dies because a doctor neglects his obligations. Sharon Gless and Jess Walton guest star.
129	7	"A Fevered Angel"	Randal Kleiser	Norman Hudis	October 22, 1974
Dr. Welby and Kiley fight to save the life of a three-year-old boy, whose mother will not allow the child to be given proper medical treatment because of her fanatical beliefs. Donna Mills and Robert Drivas guest star.
130	8	"Feedback"	Walter Doniger	Richard Milton, Art Sarno	October 29, 1974
Life outside the boxing ring—permanently—is not easy for Danny Williams (Herbert Jefferson Jr.), a promising young fighter who hides the fact that he has epilepsy from his wife, Laurie (Leslie Uggams). Williams struggles with having to adjust to a new life, despite the best efforts of Welby, Kiley and Laurie. John Milford and Tom Selleck guest star.
131	9	"No Gods in Sight"	Hollingsworth Morse	S : Robert Hamner; T : Norman Hudis	November 12, 1974
A brilliant researcher has trouble adjusting to doctor-patient relationships. Carl Betz guest stars.
132	10	"Hell Is Upstairs"	Hollingsworth Morse	Norman Hudis	November 19, 1974
Dr. Welby has to win the trust of a child who must undergo surgery while staying conscious. Shirley Knight and Mike Farrell guest star.
133	11	"The Last Rip-Off"	William Asher	S : Norman Hudis; S/T : Harold H. Harnum	November 26, 1974
Dr. Welby exposes an unscrupulous funeral director who preys on the relatives of the deceased. Virginia Gregg and Richard Basehart guest star.
134	12	"Child of Silence"	John Erman	Jean Holloway	December 3, 1974
A mother refuses surgery to cure her child's deafness, and the child almost loses her life. Lois Nettleton guest stars.
135	13	"The 266 Days"	Jerry London	Jerome Ross	December 10, 1974
A career woman (Gena Rowlands), delighted to be pregnant at last, joins Consuelo's medical care group for pregnant women. Margaret Avery and Jed Allan guest star.
136	14	"The Resident"	Jerry London	Gene Thompson	December 17, 1974
An unfeeling doctor (Cliff Potts) learns a valuable lesson when he is hospitalized following an accident.
137	15	"Dark Fury: Part 1"	Unknown	David Victor	January 7, 1975
Dr. Kiley takes Susan Davis (Lindsay Wagner) out to dinner to celebrate the first anniversary of her medical procedure. When Kiley takes her home, he leaves, but then he hears her scream. At length he succeeds in battering down her door, and finds that she has been sexually violated by her ex-boyfriend, Wayne Trent. Kiley takes Susan to the hospital. Later, he goes after Trent who, in attempting to flee, is seriously injured when his car crashes into a concrete pillar.
138	16	"Dark Fury: Part 2"	Unknown	Unknown	January 14, 1975
After Susan Davis (Lindsay Wagner) has been molested by her ex-boyfriend, who has constantly harassed her, Kiley tries to find him. After an accident occurs in which the attacker almost dies, Kiley is subsequently charged with malpractice.
139	17	"Public Secrets"	Leo Penn	Eugene Price	January 21, 1975
A man's extramarital affair costs him a job and causes his wife to have a heart attack. Logan Ramsey, Mark Miller and Juliet Mills guest star.
140	18	"The Time Bomb"	Marc Daniels	Jerome Ross	January 28, 1975
Dr. Welby has serious self-doubts when a young woman is diagnosed with thyroid cancer and blames him because of radiation treatments he recommended for her when she was a child. Lucie Arnaz and Gavan O'Herlihy guest star.
141	19	"Four Plus Hot"	Rick Edelstein	Norman Hudis	February 4, 1975
The reunion of two former high-school football teammates is marred by death. The bitter controversy over American involvement in Vietnam is illustrated here between two old friends. One is a conscientious objector who has contracted a terminal illness. The other is a Vietnam war veteran. Scott Newman and Ben Murphy guest star.
142	20	"Jake's Okay"	Unknown	David Victor	February 11, 1975
Jake, a teenage boy with undetected minimal brain damage (Scott Jacoby) does poorly in school and in his relationships with others.
143	21	"Save the Last Dance for Me"	Unknown	Unknown	February 18, 1975
Two women who suspect they have breast cancer react in contrasting ways. Pamela Hensley and Elaine Giftos guest star.
144	22	"The Unindicted Wife"	Marc Daniels	Norman Hudis	February 25, 1975
Kate Gannard (Patty Duke) is admitted into the hospital by Dr. Welby for an appendectomy. Although she suffers from high blood pressure, it is not a problem at the time. However, when she comes home to recuperate, she finds out that her husband Martin (John Astin) has been accused of having accepted money in connection with the awarding of a building contract. The notoriety has a devastating effect on her, causing her blood pressure to soar so high that it may kill her. She is rushed to the hospital where Dr. Welby fights to save her life.
145	23	"Dark Corridors"	Richard Milton	Jean Holloway	March 4, 1975
Shaken by the death of a friend, Dr. Welby becomes emotionally involved with an ailing teenager. Robin Mattson, Joanne Dru and Rosemary DeCamp guest star.
146	24	"Loser in a Dead Heat"	Unknown	Meyer Dolinsky	March 11, 1975
Constant arguments between her parents because of her father's compulsive gambling cause a girl to suffer from hyperventilation, a condition in which the subject's intake of oxygen is excessive. Larry Hagman and Marcia Ralston guest star.

=== Season 7 (1975–1976) ===
No. overall	No. in season	Title	Directed by	Written by	Original release date
147	1	"Tomorrow May Never Come"	Walter Doniger	Richard Fielder	September 9, 1975
Dr. Kiley begins to have romantic feelings for Janet Blake (Pamela Hensley), the newest hospital director. However, tragedy soon strikes when Janet is thrown off her horse and is paralyzed.
148	2	"The Fruitfulness of Mrs. Steffie Rhodes"	Marc Daniels	Jerome Ross	September 16, 1975
Janet (Pamela Hensley) finds it difficult to cope after finding out she must help when quintuplets are set to be delivered at the hospital.
149	3	"The Lie"	Marc Daniels	Gene Thompson	September 23, 1975
The former boyfriend (Jon Cypher) of Janet Blake (Pamela Hensley) lies to Dr. Welby about the stroke he recently had, which could further endanger his life.
150	4	"The Covenant"	Walter Doniger	John W. Bloch	September 30, 1975
Janet Blake (Pamela Hensley) feels responsible after Dr. Welby is named in a malpractice lawsuit.
151	5	"The Double-Edged Razor"	Walter Doniger	Irving Elman	October 7, 1975
After his sister has to have an operation, a young man fears he may have to quit law school to help her afford it. Patty McCormack, Kim Hamilton and Tina Andrews guest star.
152	6	"To Live Another Day"	Marc Daniels	Norman Hudis	October 14, 1975
A Jewish boy named Simon (Scott Jacoby), who is suffering from a series of illnesses, longs to recover in time for his Bar Mitzvah. But his parents quarrel over whether he should go through with the ceremony, complicating his recovery. Beverly Garland and Michael Strong guest star.
153	7	"An End and a Beginning"	Marc Daniels	David Victor	October 21, 1975
Dr. Kiley and Janet Blake (Pamela Hensley) ruin her mother's wedding plans she had made, when the two get married sooner than she had expected. Julie Adams guest stars.
154	8	"The Tidal Wave"	Marc Daniels	Eugene Price	October 28, 1975
The Kileys' seemingly amicable plumber suffers from a series of uncontrolled violent outbursts, and it is up to Kiley and Welby to find out why and prescribe treatment... before the man kills someone. Anthony Geary and Aldo Ray guest star.
155	9	"The Strange Behavior of Paul Kelland"	Randal Kleiser	Jerome Ross	November 4, 1975
Dr. Welby cannot figure out why a husband refuses to have his ill wife hospitalized. Lloyd Haynes and Denise Nicholas guest star.
156	10	"Calculated Risk"	Walter Doniger	Richard Fielder	November 11, 1975
After his return from South America, Dr. Welby's son-in-law soon begins showing signs of heart disease.
157	11	"Killer of Dreams"	Hollingsworth Morse	Norman Hudis	November 18, 1975
A young couple's dream of the perfect wedding is shattered by a recurring illness. Don Galloway and Jill Jaress guest star.
158	12	"The Medea Factor"	Hollingsworth Morse	S : Connie Izay; S/T : Norman Hudis	December 2, 1975
After being placed with foster parents, a young boy now refuses to speak and Welby and Kiley seek to find out the true reason. Cassie Yates and Gary Crosby guest star.
159	13	"The One Face in the World"	Unknown	David Victor	December 9, 1975
After her father is diagnosed with leukemia, a young doctor tries to convince Welby that she needs to be involved in his medical care. Diane Baker, Gary Crosby and Robert Hays guest star.
160	14	"Go Ahead and Cry"	Unknown	Unknown	December 16, 1975
Consuelo has to undergo major surgery and must also consider a recent marriage proposal. Don Defore guest stars.
161	15	"Strike Two!"	Dennis Donnelly	Jerome Ross	January 6, 1976
Scott (Kent McCord), a former rookie-of-the-year baseball player who became an alcoholic, finally gets another chance at life when he and his wife, Norma (Shelley Fabares), become the physical education directors at the center. When a hepatitis epidemic breaks out, the cases are traced to Scott. The people at the center reject Scott and he returns to the bottle, feeling that his world has collapsed.
162	16	"How Do You Know What Hurts Me?"	Joseph Pevney	Jack Morse	January 13, 1976
A young showgirl (Sheree North) collapses after a performance from an infection and does not reveal that she recently has had silicone injections. Simon Oakland guest stars.
163	17	"Prisoner of the Island Cell: Part 1"	Marc Daniels	S : Philip Chapin; T : Norman Hudis	January 20, 1976
Even though there is evidence to prove it, Dr. Welby is convinced that a young doctor he works with is not guilty of the rape he is charged with.
164	18	"Prisoner of the Island Cell: Part 2"	Marc Daniels	S : Philip Chapin; T : Norman Hudis	January 27, 1976
After being accused of rape, one of Dr. Welby's colleagues is asked to quit practicing.
165	19	"The Highest Mountain"	Russ Mayberry	Eugene Price	February 17, 1976
166	20	"The Highest Mountain"	Russ Mayberry	Eugene Price	February 17, 1976
Dr. Kiley is studying to be a brain surgeon and fills in while Dr. Welby is on vacation visiting Sandy and Phil. Dr. Kiley suffers a stroke which leaves him paralyzed. This causes Dr. Welby to change his mind about how he must treat the stroke. Cameo by Maureen Reagan.
167	21	"To Trump an Ace"	Joseph E. Kenney	Max Hodge	February 24, 1976
A fast-living pilot postpones diagnostic tests to determine if he has asthma because he fears losing his pilot's license and livelihood. Fionnula Flanagan and Tony Becker guest star.
168	22	"All Passions Spent"	Richard Milton	Richard Fielder	March 2, 1976
Kiley is accused of making advances to the wife of his old college roommate, who is now a heart attack victim. Dick Gautier and Tina Louise guest star.
169	23	"Vanity Case: Part 1" "Aspects of Love"	Joseph Pevney	Norman Hudis	April 27, 1976
Sandy (Anne Schedeen) gets engaged to Paul (Cliff Potts); Paul's ex-wife, Hedy Moran (Gretchen Corbett) undergoes tests to find out what is wrong with her vision.
170	24	"Vanity Case: Part 2"	Leo Penn	Norman Hudis	May 4, 1976
Just as Welby is accepting Paul's engagement to Sandy, the former Mrs. Moran returns and is suffering from loss of vision.

== TV films ==
Title	Directed by	Written by	Original release date
The Return of Marcus Welby, M.D.	Alexander Singer	S : Michael Braverman; S/S : John McGreevey	May 16, 1984
Marcus Welby is back, and he has a couple problems. First, he is trying to bridge the gap between an old friend of his who gave up practicing medicine in favor of being the hospital administrator, and his son who is now a doctor who is currently treating a woman who has kidney problems. Second, the hospital that he has served faithfully for years is considering letting some of their elderly staff members go, and Mark is at the top of the list.
Marcus Welby, M.D.: A Holiday Affair	Steve Gethers	Steve Gethers	December 19, 1988
Marcus Welby takes a holiday in Europe, where he finds romance with a rich divorced woman who is also being pursued by her ex-husband.

== See also ==
- List of Owen Marshall: Counselor at Law episodes
