= Marcus Welby, M.D. =

American medical drama television series (1969–1976)

- Marcus Welby, M.D. title card
- Created by: David Victor
- Starring: Robert Young; James Brolin
- Theme music composer: Leonard Rosenman
- Country of origin: United States
- Original language: English
- No. of seasons: 7
- No. of episodes: 170 (list of episodes)

Production
- Executive producer: David Victor
- Producer: David J. O'Connell
- Camera setup: Single-camera
- Running time: 60 minutes
- Production company: Universal Television

Original release
- Network: ABC
- Release: September 23, 1969 – May 4, 1976

Marcus Welby, M.D. is an American medical drama television series that aired on ABC from September 23, 1969, to May 4, 1976. It starred Robert Young as the title character, a family practitioner with a kind bedside manner, who made house calls and was on a first-name basis with many of his patients; James Brolin as his partner Steven Kiley, a younger doctor; and Elena Verdugo as Consuelo Lopez, Welby and Kiley's dedicated and caring nurse and office manager.

Marcus Welby, M.D. was produced by David Victor and David J. O'Connell through Universal Television, which was then an MCA company. The pilot, titled "A Matter of Humanities", had aired as an ABC Movie of the Week on March 26, 1969.

The program notably became the first ABC network show to rank No. 1, in the 1970–71 television season.

== Overview ==
As with most medical dramas of the day, the plots often concerned a professional conflict between well-meaning physicians. Here, Welby's unorthodox way of treating patients was pitted against the more straight-laced methods of Kiley (Brolin). The catch with this particular program was that the roles were reversed in that Kiley was much younger than Welby. The opening credits of each episode reminded viewers of the generation gap between the two doctors, Welby driving his sedan and Kiley riding a motorcycle. Welby had served in the US Navy as a doctor during the war, and was a widower.

The doctors worked alongside each other in their private practice in Santa Monica, California, regularly working in conjunction with the nearby Lang Memorial Hospital. (This was later revealed in exterior shots to be the real-life Saint John's Hospital and Health Center in Santa Monica.) At the office, their loyal secretary-nurse and friend was Consuelo Lopez (Elena Verdugo). Other characters that appeared throughout the series included Dr. Welby's frequent girlfriend Myra Sherwood (Anne Baxter), his daughter Sandy (originally Christine Belford, and later Anne Schedeen) and her son Phil (Gavin Brendan), and Kathleen Faverty (Sharon Gless), an assistant program director at the hospital, who worked closely with Welby and Kiley. Kiley met and married public relations director Janet Blake (played by Pamela Hensley) in 1975, at the beginning of the show's final season on the air.

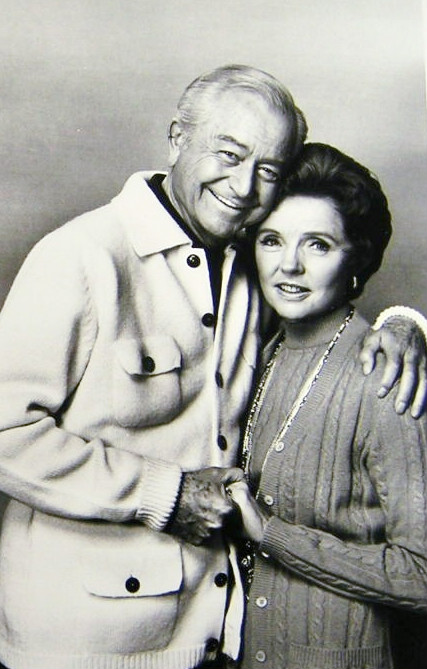
Young and Wyatt on Marcus Welby, M.D.

In the episode "Designs", which aired on March 12, 1974, Young was reunited with his Father Knows Best co-star, Jane Wyatt; she played a fashion designer whose marriage to an embittered paraplegic led her to fall in love with the doctor while keeping her marriage a secret most of the episode.

== Politics ==
The 1973 episode "The Other Martin Loring" was about a middle-aged man whom Welby advised to resist his homosexual impulses. The Gay Activists Alliance (GAA) zapped ABC, occupied its New York headquarters and picketed. The next year, "The Outrage" was a story of a teenaged student who was sexually assaulted by his male teacher, associating homosexuality with pedophilia. Seven sponsors refused to buy television advertising time, and 17 television network affiliates refused to air the episode. This was the first known instance of network affiliates refusing a network episode in response to protests.

In addition, an episode dealing with abortion was refused by San Diego area ABC affiliate XETV, a station licensed to Tijuana across the border in Mexico, due to that country's stance on the practice at the time.

== Episodes ==
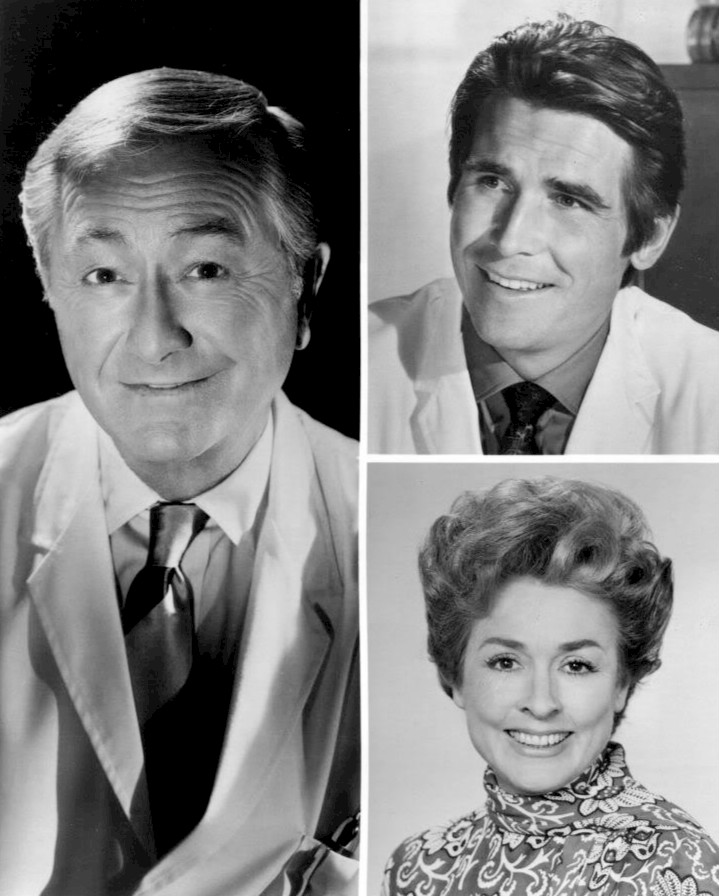
Robert Young, James Brolin, Elena Verdugo (1971)

Season	Episodes	Originally released	
Season	Episodes	First released	Last released
Pilot		March 26, 1969	
1	26	September 23, 1969	April 14, 1970
2	24	September 22, 1970	March 30, 1971
3	24	September 14, 1971	March 14, 1972
4	24	September 12, 1972	March 6, 1973
5	24	September 11, 1973	March 12, 1974
6	24	September 10, 1974	March 11, 1975
7	24	September 9, 1975	May 4, 1976
TV films		May 16, 1984	December 19, 1988

=== Crossovers with Owen Marshall, Counselor at Law ===
During its run, Marcus Welby, M.D. had two crossover stories with its legal spin-off series, Owen Marshall, Counselor at Law.

In "Men Who Care", Marshall defends the father of Welby's patient when the man is accused of murdering his daughter's boyfriend. In "I've Promised You a Father", Marshall defends Kiley in a paternity suit filed by a nurse claiming that Kiley is the father of her child.

== Nielsen ratings ==
Season	Rank	Rating
1969–70	#8	23.7
1970–71	#1	29.6
1971–72	#3	27.8
1972–73	#13	22.9
1973–74	#29	19.5
1974–75	#53	16.6
1975–76	#43	N/A

It was the first show in ABC's history to become the number-one show on television.

== Ending of the series ==
By the mid-1970s, the popularity of medical dramas began to wane. Ratings for both Marcus Welby, M.D. and CBS's Medical Center began to drop, as did the ratings for daytime dramas General Hospital and The Doctors. Previous episodes initially went into syndication in the fall of 1975 as Robert Young, Family Doctor (to avoid confusion with the first-run episodes still airing on ABC). The show ended its run in 1976 after 169 episodes were made. On an awards show that year, Young joked publicly, "I knew that it was time to quit when I started taking time off to play golf!"

== Television movies ==
In 1984, the reunion movie The Return of Marcus Welby, M.D. aired, with Young and Verdugo reprising their roles. The major conflict, aside from interactions with patients, centered around Welby being accused of being too old to retain his medical license safely. Though Brolin was unavailable to reprise his role as Kiley, a statement described as being from him was read before the board that would decide Welby's fate. Another movie was made in 1988, Marcus Welby, M.D.: A Holiday Affair. This last made-for-television film was the last acting role of Robert Young's career.

== Home media ==
Shout! Factory (under license from Universal Studios) has released the first two seasons of Marcus Welby, M.D. on DVD in Region 1.

Mill Creek Entertainment released a 10-episode best-of set entitled Marcus Welby, M.D.: The Best of Season One on March 22, 2011.

DVD name	Ep #	Release date
Season 1	26	May 4, 2010
Season 2	24	October 12, 2010

== Bibliography ==
- Alwood, Edward (1998). Straight News: Gays, Lesbians and the News Media. Columbia University Press. ISBN 0-231-08437-4.
- Capsuto, Steven (2000). Alternate Channels: The Uncensored Story of Gay and Lesbian Images on Radio and Television. Ballantine Books. ISBN 0-345-41243-5.
- Tropiano, Stephen (2002). The Prime Time Closet: A History of Gays and Lesbians on TV. New York, Applause Theatre and Cinema Books. ISBN 1-55783-557-8.
