= Pamela Hensley =

American actress

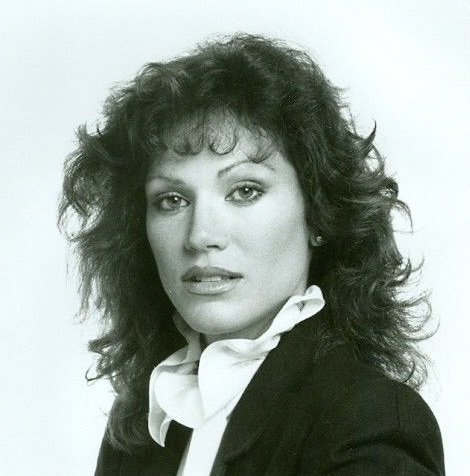
- Hensley in a promotional photograph for Matt Houston, 1982
- Born: Los Angeles, California, U.S.
- Other name: Pamela Hensley Vincent
- Occupations: Actress; author
- Years active: 1970–1985
- Known for: Matt Houston; Buck Rogers in the 25th Century; Buck Rogers in the 25th Century (TV series); Marcus Welby, M.D. Rollerball
- Spouses: Wes Farrell (m. 1978; div. 1980) E. Duke Vincent (m. 1982; died 2024)

Pamela Hensley (born October 3, 1950) is an American actress and author. Her notable acting roles include Princess Ardala on the 1979–1981 television series Buck Rogers in the 25th Century and C.J. Parsons on the 1982–1985 television series Matt Houston. She also appeared in Rollerball and Doc Savage (both 1975) and Double Exposure (1982).

== Early life ==
Hensley was born in Los Angeles. Her father was a veterinarian, and her mother was an actress.

== Career ==
Hensley played Janet Blake during the last season of Marcus Welby, M.D.. This was followed by a half season's work as an investigator on Kingston: Confidential.

She appeared in the role of Princess Ardala in the film Buck Rogers in the 25th Century (originally a television pilot that was released theatrically) before reprising her role several times in the subsequent series. Hensley also portrayed C.J. Parsons during the three-year run of the detective series Matt Houston.

== Acting roles ==
- Matt Houston as C.J. Parsons (69 episodes, 1982–1985)
- The Love Boat (2 episodes, 1984)
- Hotel as Brooke Whitfield (1 episode, 1984)
- Double Exposure (1982) as Sgt. Fontain
- Fantasy Island as Linda Whitney (1 episode, 1982)
- Rooster (1982) (TV) as Bunny Richter
- 240-Robert (1981) TV series as Deputy Sandy Harper (3 episodes / second season, 1981)
- Condominium (1980) (TV) as Drusilla Byrne
- The Nude Bomb (1980) as Agent 36
- Buck Rogers in the 25th Century as Princess Ardala (pilot feature and 4 episodes, 1979–1980)
- The Rebels (1979) (TV) as Charlotte Waverly
- B. J. and the Bear as Holly Tremaine (1 episode, 1979)
- Vega$ as Valerie Kemmet (1 episode, 1979)
- Sharks (1978) (TV) as Cynthia Grayland
- Switch as Sandra Summers (2 episodes, 1977)
- The Six Million Dollar Man (3 episodes, 1977)
- Kingston: Confidential as Beth Kelly (13 episodes, 1977)
- Kingston (1976) (TV) as Beth Kelly
- Marcus Welby, M.D. as Janet Blake (Riley) / (24 episodes, 1975–1976)
- Rollerball (1975) as Mackie
- Doc Savage: The Man of Bronze (1975) as Mona
- Death Among Friends (1975) (TV) as Connie Benson
- The Rockford Files as Jennifer Ryburn (1 episode, 1975)
- The Specialists (1975) (TV)
- The Law (1974) (TV) as Cindy Best
- Ironside (1 episode, 1974)
- Lucas Tanner as Dee Wiggins (1 episode, 1974)
- McMillan & Wife as Gwynneth Jerome (1 episode, 1974)
- Owen Marshall: Counselor at Law as Miss Lathan (1 episode, 1974)
- Toma (1 episode, 1974)
- Chase (1 episode, 1974)
- Adam-12 as Nurse (1 episode, 1974)
- Kojak: Death is Not a Passing Grade as Delta, (1974)
- Emergency! as Wanda (1 episode, 1974)
- Banacek as Mandy (1 episode, 1974)
- The New Treasure Hunt (1973) TV series as Model (1973–1974)
- Griff as June (episode "Isolate and Destroy", 1973)
- Self-Portrait (1973)
- Making It (1971) as Bargirl
- There Was a Crooked Man... (1970) as Edwina
