= Rollerball (chess variant) =

Chess variant

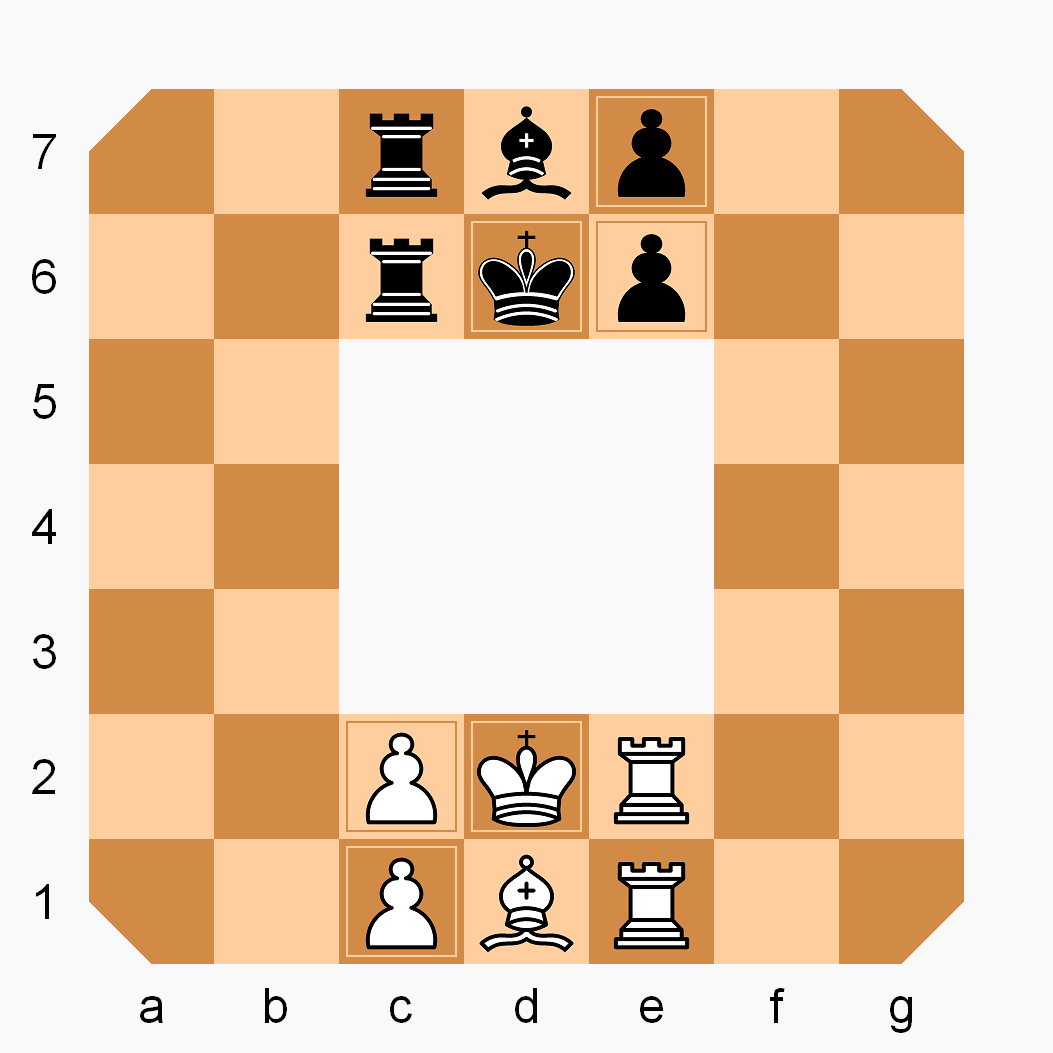
Rollerball gameboard and starting position

Rollerball is a chess variant invented by Jean-Louis Cazaux in 1998. The game was inspired by the 1975 science-fiction movie Rollerball, specifically the futuristic and violent sport (similar to Roller Derby) portrayed in the film.

The board comprises 7×7 squares with the central 3×3 section missing. Pieces generally move clockwise around the board. Each player starts with one king, one bishop, two rooks, and two pawns. Both bishops are light-squared on the initial setup. Dark-squared bishops can only be obtained by pawn promotion.

== Game rules ==
The initial setup is as shown. White moves first. Pieces move and capture the same as their chess counterparts, except where explained differently below.

=== Objective ===
There are two ways to win in Rollerball:

1. Checkmating the enemy king.
2. Bringing one's own king to the starting square of the enemy king on the opposite side of the board (but only when having travelled to that side of the board in a clockwise direction).

The same as in chess, stalemate and threefold repetition of position are draws.

=== Piece moves ===
In general, forward movement means clockwise direction around the board; backward movement means counterclockwise direction. The squares comprising the board's inner and outer perimeters are called rings. The ring a rook or pawn currently stands on determines its orthogonal forward direction, and for a rook, its orthogonal backward direction. An orthogonal rook move in a direction immediately off its ring is called sideways movement.

- The king moves the same as the king in chess: one step in any direction. As in chess, a player may not place his king in check. There is no castling in Rollerball.
- A rook moves any number of steps orthogonally in a straight line in a forward direction, or any number of steps orthogonally sideways. It can also move one step orthogonally backward on its ring. When moving along the outer ring, the rook may "rebound" off a corner square and continue its forward journey at 90 degrees. (Corner squares have 45 degree edges for rebounding.) Only one rebound is permitted for a given rook move.
- The bishop moves any number of steps diagonally forward, or one step diagonally backward. The bishop may rebound off an outer or inner board edge and continue its forward diagonal journey at 90 degrees. Only one rebound is permitted for a given bishop move.
- A pawn moves and captures one step orthogonally forward on the ring on which it currently stands, or one step diagonally forward to either ring. A pawn does not move backward or sideways, and there is no initial two-step option. A pawn promotes to rook or bishop when reaching either of the two starting squares of the opponent's pawns.

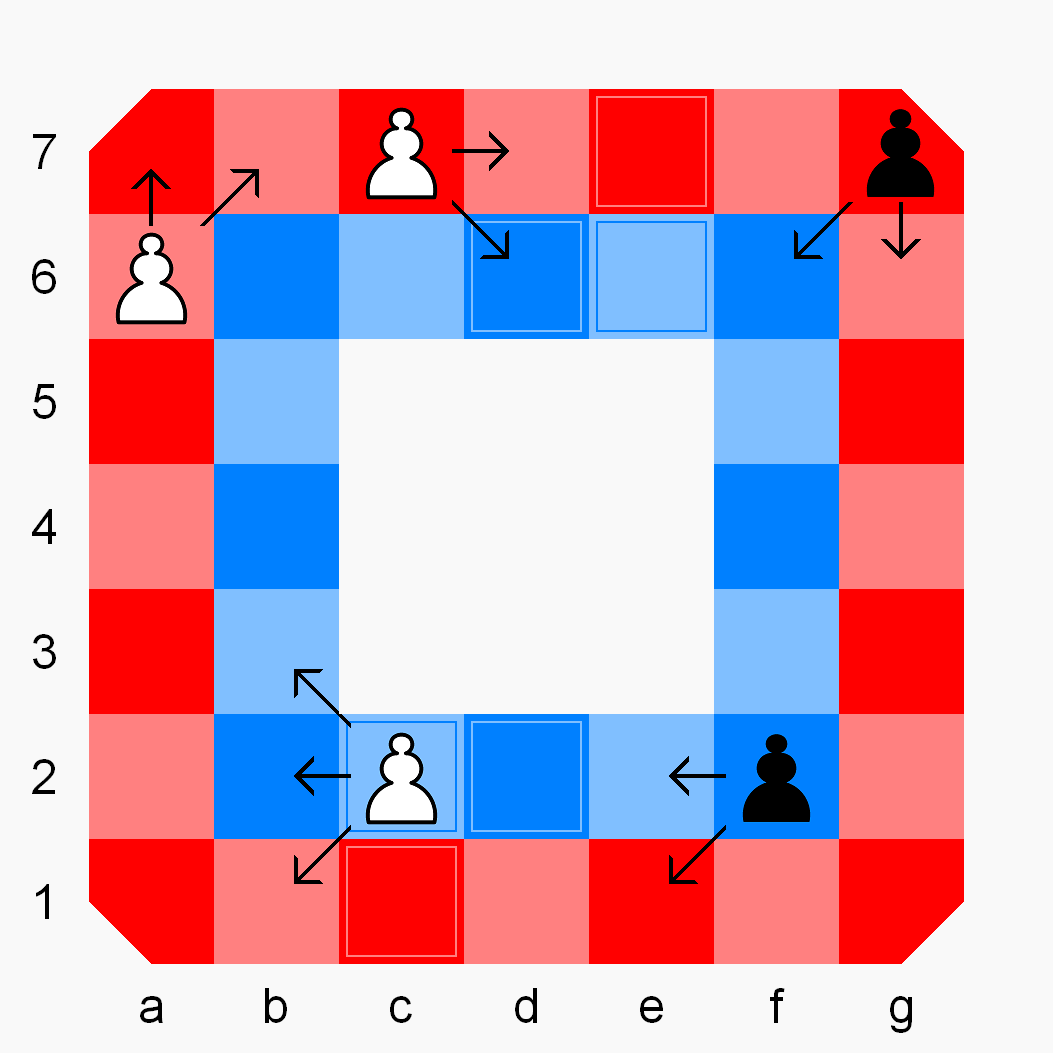
Red and blue are used to highlight the board's rings. A pawn always moves one step straight forward on the ring it currently stands, or one step diagonally forward to either ring. A pawn never moves backward on its ring, or sideways off its ring.

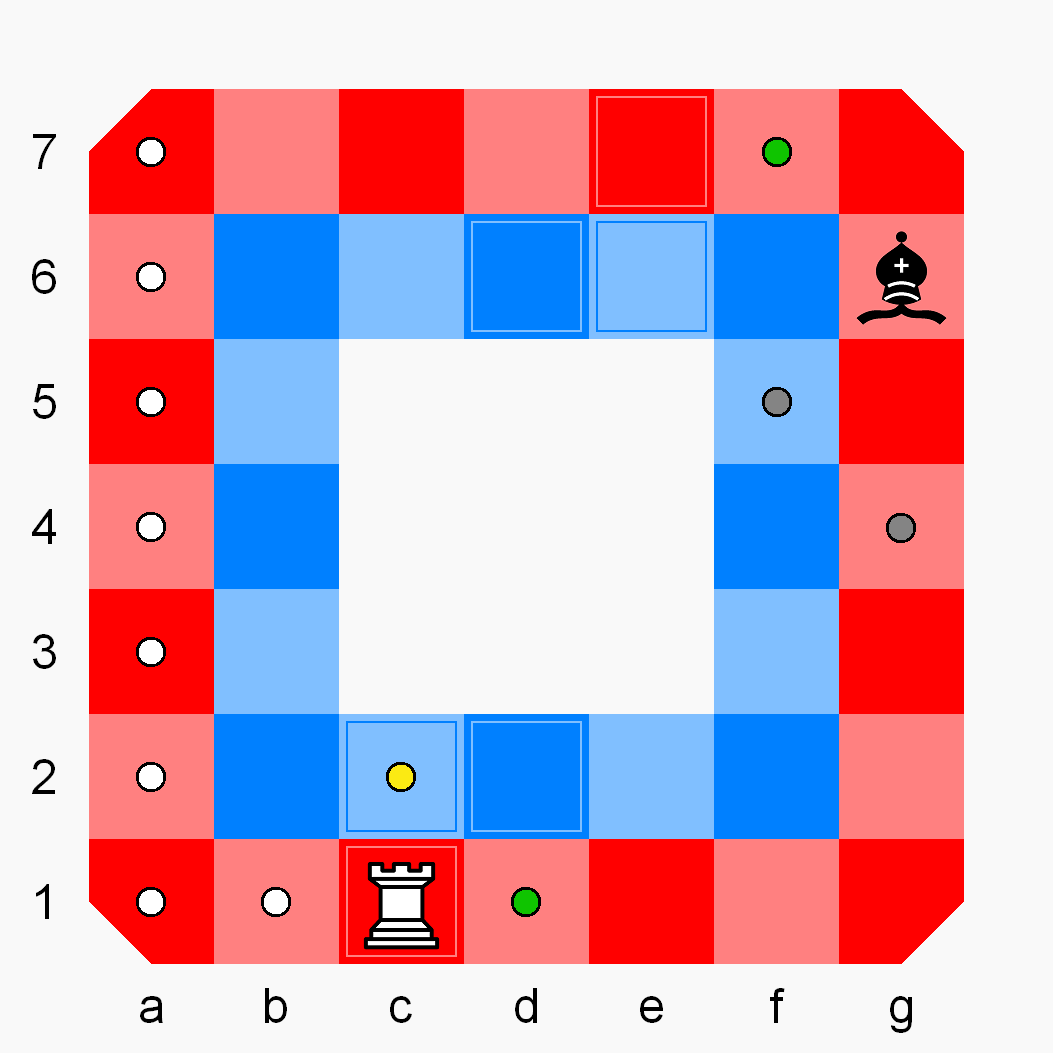
The rook can move forward to any white dot, including one rebound off the a1 corner. It can also move sideways (yellow dot), or one step backward on its ring (green dot). The bishop can move to gray dots, rebounding off the inner board perimeter (f5), or move one diagonal step backward (green dot).

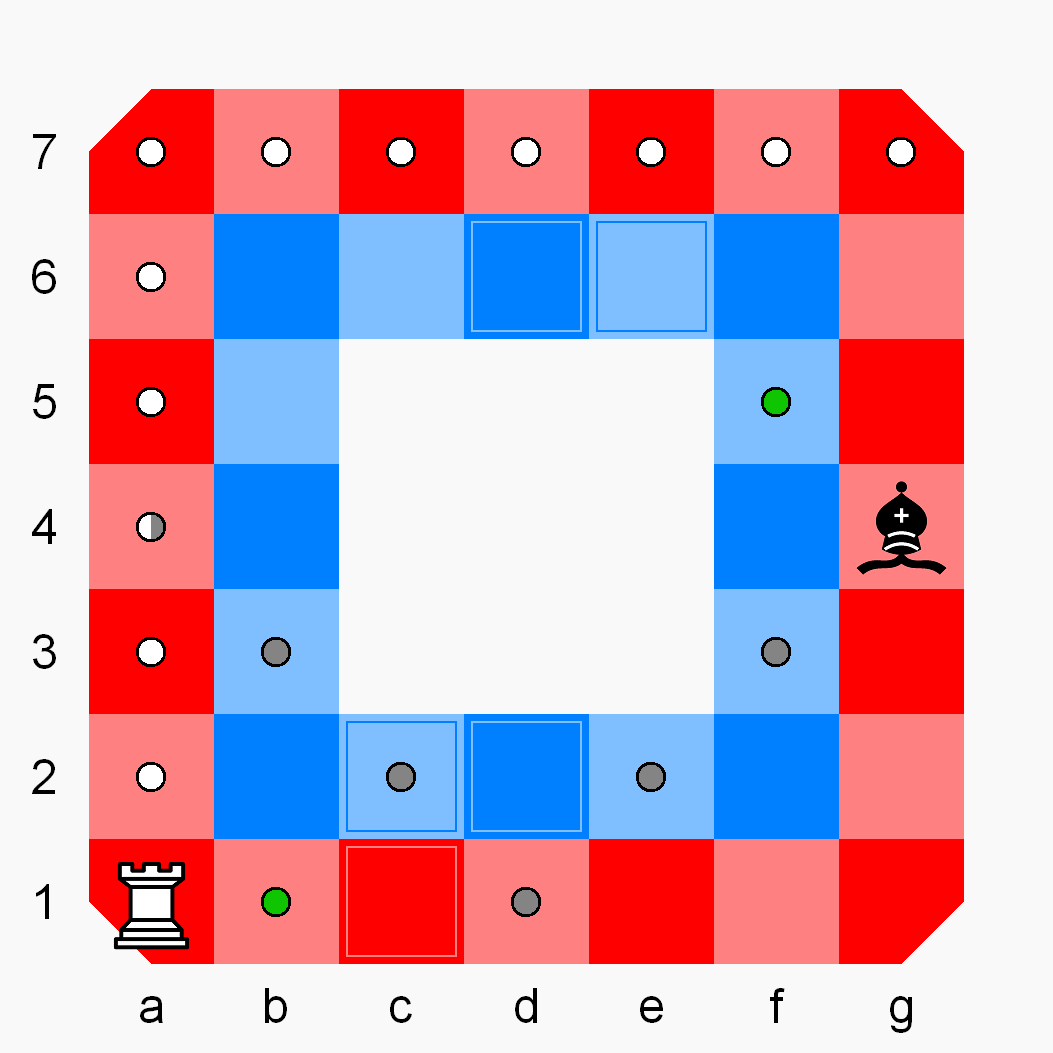
The rook can move to any white dot, rebounding once off a7. It can move one step backward on its ring (green dot), but has no sideways move available. The bishop can move to any gray dot, rebounding once off the exterior perimeter (d1). It can also move one step backward (green dot).

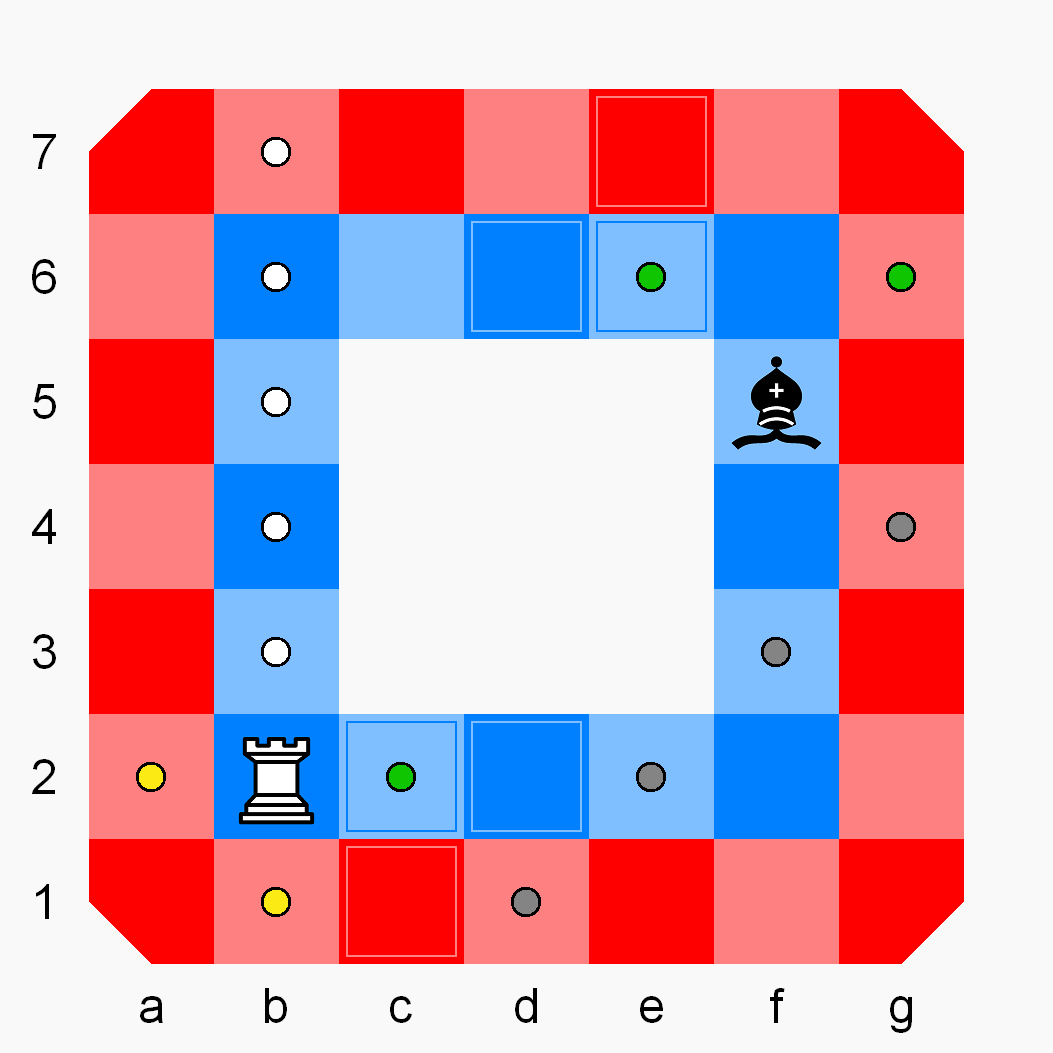
Here, the rook can move in forward direction determined by its ring (to any white dot). It has two sideways moves (yellow dots), and one backward move (green dot) available. The bishop can move to any gray dot, including one rebound off g4. It has two backward move options (green dots).

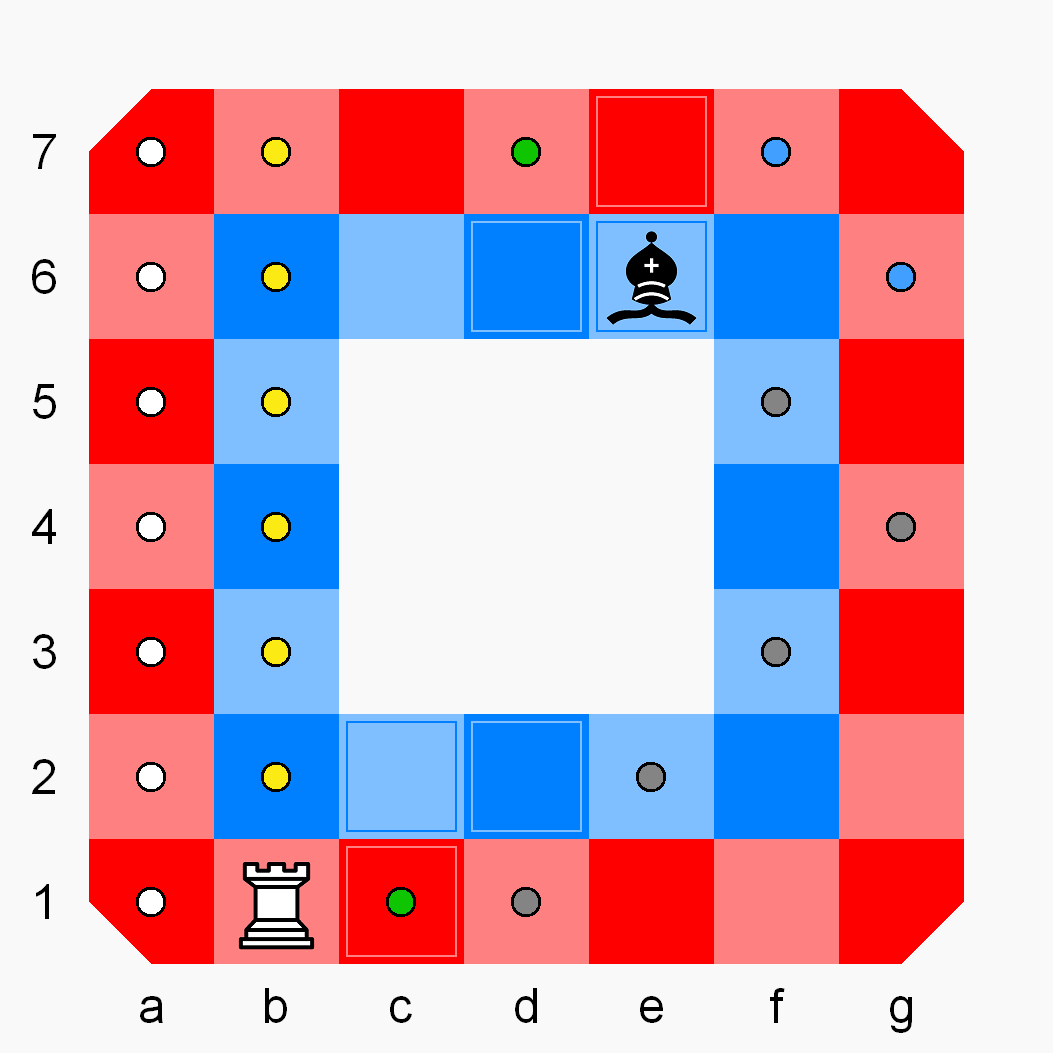
Here, the rook can move forward on its ring (white dots, rebounding off a1), or move any distance in sideways direction (yellow dots). It has one backward move on its ring (green dot). The bishop can move to any gray dot (rebounding once off g4), or any blue dot (rebounding once off f7). It has one backward move (green dot).

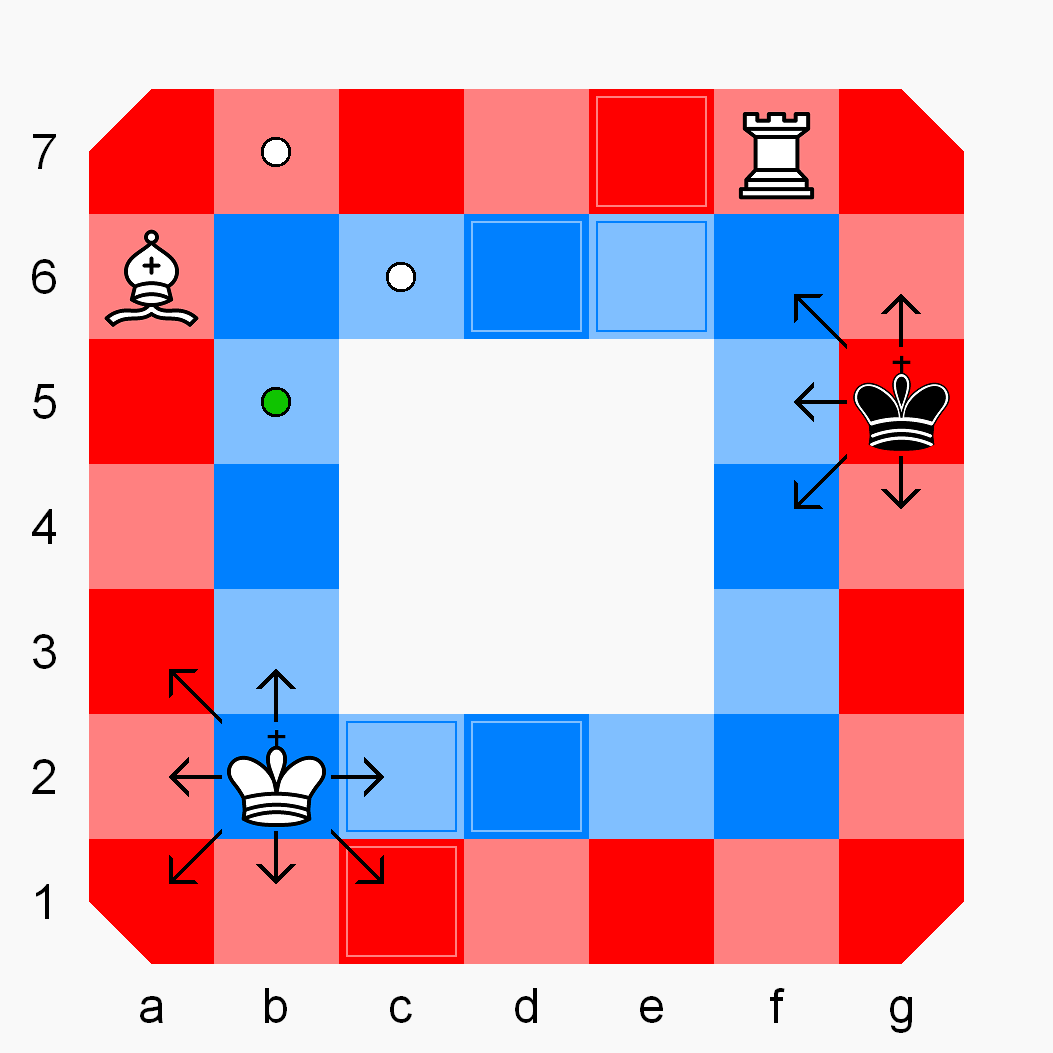
The kings move the same as kings in chess: one step in any direction. The bishop can move forward diagonally to white dots (including one rebound off b7), or one step diagonally backward (green dot). The rook is in a very powerful position in the diagram; without assistance, it has the black king in checkmate.
