= Rollerball (1975 film) =

1975 film by Norman Jewison

- Theatrical release poster by Bob Peak
- Directed by: Norman Jewison
- Screenplay by: William Harrison
- Based on: "Roller Ball Murder" (1973 short story) by William Harrison
- Produced by: Norman Jewison
- Starring: James Caan; John Houseman; Maud Adams; John Beck; Moses Gunn; Pamela Hensley; Barbara Trentham; Ralph Richardson
- Cinematography: Douglas Slocombe
- Edited by: Antony Gibbs
- Music by: André Previn
- Production company: Algonquin Films
- Distributed by: United Artists
- Release date: June 25, 1975 (U.S.)
- Running time: 129 minutes
- Country: United States
- Language: English
- Budget: $5-6 million
- Box office: $30 million

Rollerball is a 1975 American dystopian science-fiction sports film directed and produced by Norman Jewison, and starring James Caan, John Houseman, Maud Adams, John Beck, Moses Gunn and Ralph Richardson. The screenplay, written by William Harrison, adapted his own short story "Roller Ball Murder", which had first appeared in the September 1973 issue of Esquire.

Set in a "not too distant" future world ruled by a corporatocracy, the film centers on the titular sport — an often-brutal spectacle used to help placate the populace. Jonathan E. (Caan), the sport's top player, finds himself at odds with the ruling powers, when his popularity threatens to hurt their grip on power.

The film was released by United Artists on June 25, 1975. Rollerball was a box office success, and critical reviews were initially mixed but have warmed somewhat over time, and the film inspired a wave of similar, dystopian-themed sports films. A remake was released in 2002.

== Plot ==
In 2018, Jonathan E. is the team captain and veteran star of the Houston Rollerball team. Mr. Bartholomew, chairman of the Energy Corporation — one of a series of corporations that now govern society — and team sponsor, offers Jonathan a lavish retirement package if he will announce his retirement during an upcoming television special detailing his career. Jonathan refuses, and requests to see his former wife Ella, who had been taken from him some years earlier by a corporate executive who wanted her for himself.

Jonathan goes to a library, where he finds that all books have been digitized and edited to suit the corporations, and are now stored on supercomputers at large protected corporate locations. Jonathan's friend and former coach Cletus, now an Energy executive, warns him that the Executive Committee is afraid of him, though he cannot find out why.

Rollerball soon degrades into senseless violence as the rules are changed to force Jonathan out. The semi-final match between Houston and Tokyo is played with no penalties and limited substitutions in the hope Jonathan will be injured and forced out. The brutality of the match kills several players on both teams and leaves Jonathan's best friend and teammate Moonpie brain-dead, though Houston wins the game.

In a teleconference, the Executive Committee decides that the final match will be played with no penalties, no substitutions, and no time limit in the hope that Jonathan will be killed during the game. Jonathan's popularity and longevity as a player threaten the underlying agenda of Rollerball: to demonstrate the futility of individualism.

Jonathan makes his way to Geneva to access the world's repository of all human knowledge, a central supercomputer known as "Zero," only to find its memory corrupted. Afterwards, Jonathan receives a visit from his former wife Ella, who has been sent to convince him to retire and to make it clear that the coming game will be "to the death". Jonathan realizes his wife's visit was set up by the Executives, and erases a long-cherished movie of the two of them, stating, "I just wanted you on my side". Jonathan decides that despite the dangers, he will play in the championship game against New York.

The final match devolves into a brutal gladiatorial fight. Jonathan is soon the only Houston player left on the track, while a skater and a biker remain from New York. After a violent struggle in front of Mr. Bartholomew's box, Jonathan kills the skater and takes the ball. The biker charges, and Jonathan knocks him off the bike and pins him down. Refusing to kill his fallen opponent, Jonathan gets to his feet and makes his way to the goal, slamming the ball home and scoring the game's only point. Jonathan then takes a victory lap as the crowd chants his name, first softly, then slowly rising to a roar while Mr. Bartholomew hastily exits the stands.

== Cast ==
- James Caan as Jonathan E.
- John Houseman as Mr. Bartholomew
- Maud Adams as Ella
- John Beck as 'Moonpie'
- Moses Gunn as Cletus
- Ralph Richardson as The Librarian
- Pamela Hensley as Mackie
- Barbara Trentham as Daphne
- John Normington as Ballard
- Shane Rimmer as Rusty
- Burt Kwouk as Tokyo Doctor
- Nancy Bleier as Girl In Library
- Richard LeParmentier as Bartholomew's Aide
- Robert Ito as Houston Strategy Coach

Uncredited

- Dick Enberg as Pregame Announcer
- Bob Miller as Game Announcer
- Byron Morrow as Referee
- Tony Brubaker as Blue
- Robert Lee Minor as Gaines
- Angus MacInnes as Jonathan's Bodyguard
- Anthony Chinn as Reporter
- Yasuko Nagazumi as Masseuse
- Valli Kemp and Sarah Douglas as Party Guests
- Derek Timpson as lead Derny driver
- Robert Lee and Mac McDonald as Executives

== Production ==
=== Development ===
The film is based on a short story, entitled "Roller Ball Murder", published in Esquire, by novelist William Harrison, who joined the University of Arkansas English department in 1964 and established the Creative Writing Program. Norman Jewison bought the story and hired Harrison to co-write the screenplay with him (they shared an agent) and made a deal with United Artists.

=== Filming ===
Rollerball's arena sequences were shot at the Rudi-Sedlmayer-Halle in Munich, West Germany. This hall was selected because it was the only sports arena in the world with a near-circular profile, which the production could take over and re-dress for shooting. The track surface was designed by renowned track specialist Derek Timpson.

The then-new BMW Headquarters and Museum buildings in Munich appear as the headquarters buildings of the Energy Corporation at Olympiapark, Munich. The sequence where Jonathan E. visits Geneva to consult with Zero the supercomputer concerning corporate decisions uses exterior shots of the Palace of Nations. Scenes were also filmed at Fawley Power Station, near Southampton, England. The remainder of the film was shot at Pinewood Studios.

The film was shot in 35mm with a 1.85 aspect ratio but was released in some theaters in 70mm with a 2:1 aspect ratio.

=== Stunts and design ===
As the titular sport was only referred to vaguely in Harrison's original short story, rollerball was created largely by Norman Jewison and his production designer John Box, who conceptualized it as a "blend of a roulette wheel and a pinball machine," combining elements of roller derby, hockey, football, motocross racing, and judo. A custom track was designed and created by Herbert Schürmann, who had previously designed the track at the 1972 Munich Olympics.

Recognizing their contribution to the film's many crucial action sequences, Rollerball was the first major Hollywood production to give screen credit to its stunt performers. English pro wrestler Mark Rocco was one of the stuntmen, and would later use "Rollerball" as his ring name.

The game of Rollerball was so realistic that the cast, extras, and stunt personnel played it between takes on the set. At the time of the film's release, Howard Cosell interviewed Norman Jewison and James Caan on ABC's Wide World of Sports, showing clips from the film and with the two of them explaining the rules of the game. Audiences who saw the film so loved the action of the game that Jewison was contacted multiple times by promoters, requesting that the "rights to the game" be sold so that real Rollerball leagues might be formed. Jewison was outraged, as the entire point of the movie was to show the "sickness and insanity of contact sports and their allure."

== Music ==
Bach's Toccata and Fugue in D minor is performed on organ by Simon Preston during the opening title sequence and again at the final scene, bookending the film. Adagio in G minor by Albinoni/Giazotto and the Largo movement from Shostakovich's Symphony No. 5 are also used to establish tone, mood, and atmosphere for certain scenes in the film. The classical music was performed by the London Symphony Orchestra, conducted by André Previn, who also wrote the "Executive Party" music for the film and the corporate anthems performed before certain matches.

== Release ==
The film was released in the United States on June 25, 1975. It had its European premiere at the Odeon Leicester Square in London on September 3, 1975, before opening to the public there the following day.

== Reception ==
=== Box office ===
The film earned $6.2 million in theatrical rentals at the box office in the United States and Canada.

=== Critical response ===
On Rotten Tomatoes, the film has an approval rating of 56% based on reviews from 112 critics, with an average rating of 6.4/10. The site's consensus reads: "Its dystopia vision is presented with striking brutality and visual splendor, but Rollerball is often undermined by shallow characterizations and a script that delivers social critique without much conviction." On Metacritic the film has a score of 56 out of 100 based on reviews from 11 critics, indicating "mixed or average reviews".

Most major critics were negative about the film upon its original release. Vincent Canby of The New York Times was unimpressed:

All science-fiction can be roughly divided into two types of nightmares. In the first the world has gone through a nuclear holocaust and civilization has reverted to a neo-stone Age. In the second, of which "Rollerball" is an elaborate and very silly example, all of mankind's problems have been solved but at the terrible price of individual freedom. ... The only way science-fiction of this sort makes sense is as a comment on the society for which it's intended, and the only way "Rollerball" would have made sense in a satire of our national preoccupation with televised professional sports, particularly weekend football. Yet "Rollerball" isn't a satire. It's not funny at all and, not being funny, it becomes, instead, frivolous.

Gene Siskel of the Chicago Tribune gave the film 2 stars out of 4 and called it "a movie in love with itself" and "vapid, pretentious, and arrogant. Not even John Houseman's fine performance as a villainous corporate director is sufficient to make Rollerball tolerable. The only way to enjoy it, I suppose, is to cheer at the rollerball game's mayhem." Arthur D. Murphy of Variety, wrote that it "packs an emotional and intellectual wallop" and that James Caan gave an "excellent performance". Charles Champlin of the Los Angeles Times was also positive, calling it "a fresh, unusual and stimulating movie. In its portraying of the vast and essentially stateless multinational corporations, Rollerball plays off developments which have come since Huxley's and Orwell's time." The Hollywood Reporter claimed that it was “the most original, and imaginative and technically proficient peek into our future since 2001: A Space Odyssey.” Jonathan Rosenbaum of The Monthly Film Bulletin panned Rollerball as "A classic demonstration of how several millions of dollars can be unenjoyably wasted ... this glib fable seems to be aiming at a simplified version of A Clockwork Orange without any intimations of wit or satire to carry the vague moralistic message."

James Monaco wrote that Rollerball "like most paranoid fantasies offers no hope: If James Caan can't beat the system, who can?"

TV Guide gave the film three out of four stars; it said "the performances of Caan and Richardson are excellent, and the rollerball sequences are fast-paced and interesting." Jay Cocks of Time said Caan looked "unconvinced and uncomfortable" as Jonathan E.

Filmink said the film "launched the dystopian sports movie genre and a series of rip-offs (Death Race 2000, etc) – most of which, to be frank, were a lot more fun than Rollerball, which could have stood to be a little less important and a little trashier."

In 1977, Caan himself rated the film 8 out of 10, saying he "couldn't do much with the character."

== Video games ==
In 1985, IJK Software produced a game called Rocketball for the Commodore 64 computer, with the scoring rules based on the game in the movie. In 1989, Microïds published an unofficial successor called Killerball for the Atari ST, Amiga, Amstrad CPC, and MS-DOS.

In 1997, Z-Axis Games was developing an official Rollerball video game adaptation based on the film as part of MGM Interactive video game showcase lineup. The game's promise was to recreate the action of the futuristic game played in the movie, and it was set 10 years after the events of the film in the 2098 Rollerball season, where the player would be in charge of managing their Rollerball teams around the world, made up of Rollerball players with roles such as strikers, enforcers, guard, and other players who compete using jet bikes and magnetic in-line skates. Rollerball: The Video Game was slated to be released for PlayStation, PC, and Nintendo 64 on the first quarter of 1998, but was delayed to mid-1998 and then was canceled due to the publisher, MGM Interactive, going bankrupt.

In 2004, I-play developed and published a Rollerball game for mobile phones. It is based on the 1975 film, rather than the 2002 remake of the same name.

Speedball and its sequel Speedball 2: Brutal Deluxe were influenced by Rollerball, though Bitmap Brothers co-founder Mike Montgomery denies this, saying Speedball's similarities to the film are more of a coincidence.

The developers of the 2022 game Rollerdrome cited the film as a major influence.

== Remake ==
A remake film of the same name was released by MGM on February 8, 2002. The film was directed by John McTiernan, and stars Chris Klein, Jean Reno, LL Cool J, and Rebecca Romijn. The film was critically panned and a box office bomb. William Harrison stated, "I've never watched the 2002 incarnation of Rollerball, and have no interest in it" and writing in an essay that the 2002 version was considered by critics to be "worse than the original."

== See also ==
- List of American films of 1975
- Death Race 2000, a dystopian science-fiction sports film released two months before Rollerball
- Futuresport, a 1998 TV movie with a similar premise
- Rollerball (chess variant), a chess variant inspired by the film
- Rollerdrome, a video game inspired by the film
- New lands (song), a song by the French electronic duo Justice which features a music video inspired by the film's aesthetics

Awards
Preceded by Soylent Green	Saturn Award for Best Science Fiction Film; 1974/75	Succeeded by Logan's Run
