= The Facts of Life Reunion =

- Genre: Comedy; Drama
- Written by: Max Enscoe; Annie de Young
- Directed by: Charles Herman-Wurmfeld
- Starring: Charlotte Rae; Lisa Whelchel; Mindy Cohn; Kim Fields; Joel Brooks
- Music by: Steve Dorff
- Country of origin: United States
- Original language: English

Production
- Executive producer: Ilene Amy Berg
- Producer: Greg Copeland
- Cinematography: Lawrence Sher
- Editor: Ben Weissman
- Running time: 120 minutes
- Production companies: Berger Queen Productions; Laurence Mark Productions; Columbia TriStar Domestic Television; Walt Disney Television

Original release
- Network: ABC
- Release: November 18, 2001

Related
- The Facts of Life Down Under; The Facts of Life

The Facts of Life Reunion is a 2001 American made-for-television comedy-drama film based on the 1979–1988 NBC sitcom The Facts of Life which reunited original cast members Charlotte Rae, Lisa Whelchel, Mindy Cohn and Kim Fields. Nancy McKeon was unable to participate due to scheduling conflicts with her then-starring role in the television series The Division.

The film originally aired on ABC as a presentation of The Wonderful World of Disney on November 18, 2001. It is the third television film based on the series and is preceded by The Facts of Life Goes to Paris (1982) and The Facts of Life Down Under (1987).

== Synopsis ==
Thirteen years later, a widowed Mrs. Garrett is heading back to America on a cruise ship, ready for a whole new life and also looking forward to seeing "her girls" again, all of whom have grown into successful, independent women:

- Blair Warner is a lawyer and also owns a hotel empire (Warner Enterprises) with her husband Tad Warner, managed by Mrs. Garrett's son Raymond; Blair and Tad have no children.
- Dorothy "Tootie" Ramsey—now preferring to be called Dorothy—is a morning talk show host in Los Angeles and the widowed mother of 10-year-old daughter Tisha (fathered by her longtime boyfriend and later deceased husband, Jeff Williams, who was portrayed by Todd Hallowell).
- Natalie Green is a behind-the-scenes television news producer at CNN with an active love life and a frenetic work schedule that takes her all over the world.
- Jo Polniaczek is a police detective (mirroring Nancy McKeon's then-role on "The Division"), who is still married to Rick Bonner and the mother of a 12-year-old daughter Jamie.

Natalie has talked to Mrs. Garrett and all the girls into spending the Thanksgiving holiday together back in Peekskill, New York. When Jo is unable to attend the reunion because of work, her daughter Jamie comes instead in her absence. Natalie has received two different marriage proposals but when her two boyfriends—Robert and Harper—unexpectedly both show up at the reunion, trouble soon starts and it's up to the girls to help solve Natalie's predicament. Over the course of the holiday, the girls reveal to one another the personal troubles they face in their adult years and discover that, despite the time that has passed, they need each other's friendship more than ever.

== Cast ==
- Mindy Cohn as Natalie Green
- Kim Fields as Dorothy "Tootie" Ramsey
- Lisa Whelchel as Blair Warner
- Mark Lutz as Harper Jason
- Barclay Hope as Robert James
- Joel Brooks as Raymond Garrett
- Kevin Jubinville as Tad Warner
- Carl Marotte as Rick Bonner
- Alexandra Johnson as Tisha Ramsey
- Mallory Margel as Jamie Bonner
- Joe Dinicol as Sam
- Charlotte Rae as Edna Garrett
- Jeffrey Ray as Jonathan Monroe

== Production ==
The Facts of Life Reunion was filmed from September 10, 2001 to October 8, 2001 in Toronto, Ontario, Canada. All the outdoor scenes in Peekskill and the train station were shot as the World Trade Center went down during the September 11, 2001 attacks in New York City.

Nancy McKeon originally met with the reunion's producers early on and offered to direct the movie if the plot revolved around Jo's death, similar to the film The Big Chill. This became the first plan for the movie. Said writer Debora Dean Davis in 2000, "The biggest fact of life is death." Instead, Jo was absent in the movie and her absence was explained by her role as a police detective, escorting a material witness to testify in a major trial. This was meant to mirror Nancy McKeon's role in "The Division,” which she was filming at the time of the reunion movie. In the movie, Natalie says that she hasn’t seen Jo “in a lifetime,” a reference to the Lifetime network the show was on at the time.

While filming the reunion movie, Lisa Whelchel (Blair) called Nancy McKeon (Jo) and told her how much she missed their partnership, saying, "Blair's only half the fun without Jo."

"It was a joke," McKeon later explained to Biography of her suggestion for Jo's death. "And it kind of took on some other life...I love that character. That show, that character has given me all that has come after. How could I ever not be grateful for something so wonderful in my life? But, I really don't think the world needs yet another remake of some show that was a hit back in the day." During the reunion's filming schedule, McKeon was also busy filming the second season of her Lifetime crime-drama series, The Division.

The original writers from The Facts of Life were said either not to care, weren't around, or didn't want to be a part of it so the script was written by Max Enscoe and Annie de Young with an assist by Kevin Hench and Heather Juergensen.

In a TV Guide magazine article in March 2001, Mackenzie Astin, who played Andy Moffett on The Facts of Life from 1985–88, was asked about the reunion and he was quoted as saying: "I keep hearing about that too. I hope it's not happening, because nobody's called me! If it does, I hope they do call." Ultimately, Astin did not appear in the movie, nor did series regulars Cloris Leachman, George Clooney, or Sherrie Krenn.

== Ratings ==
Nielsen ratings for The Facts of Life Reunion were 11.5 million viewers, 7.1 rating, 11 share and ranked #51 out of about 123 shows. In 2002, it re-aired on the ABC Family Channel on Saturday, September 14, Tuesday, September 17, and Wednesday, September 18.
