= The Facts of Life Down Under =

1987 television film by Stuart Margolin

- Genre: Comedy
- Written by: Gordon Cotler
- Directed by: Stuart Margolin
- Starring: Cloris Leachman; Lisa Whelchel; Kim Fields; Mindy Cohn; Nancy McKeon; Mackenzie Astin
- Music by: Fred Karlin
- Countries of origin: United States; Australia
- Original language: English

Production
- Executive producer: Virginia Carter
- Producer: Michael Lake
- Production locations: Circular Quay ferry wharf Mosman, New South Wales; Kirribilli, New South Wales; Bradleys Head; Queen Victoria Building; Sydney Opera House; Taronga Zoo; Uluṟu-Kata Tjuṯa National Park
- Cinematography: Ron Hagen
- Editor: David Stiven
- Running time: 100 minutes
- Production companies: Crawford Productions; Embassy Communications; Columbia Pictures Television

Original release
- Network: NBC
- Release: February 15, 1987

Related
- The Facts of Life Goes to Paris; The Facts of Life Reunion; The Facts of Life

The Facts of Life Down Under is a 1987 American made-for-television comedy film based on the sitcom The Facts of Life which featured the main characters of that series. This is the second television film made for the series following The Facts of Life Goes to Paris (1982). It originally aired on NBC on February 15, 1987, between the 17th and 18th episodes of season eight. The film was later split into four individual half-hour episodes when the series entered syndication. The Facts of Life Down Under occurred during the continuity of the original series.

== Synopsis ==
Beverly Ann, Blair, Jo, Natalie, Tootie and Andy fly together to Sydney, Australia to meet up with Miss Carstairs (Barbara-Jane Cole) and the female students of the Koolunga School, Eastland School's sister school establishment, where they will participate in a cultural exchange program.

Blair and Jo get involved with jewel thieves and are pursued by two men, both of whom claim to be the police and who accuse Jo and Blair of these crimes. Jo and Blair place the jewel into Natalie's bag who is off exploring with Tootie. Meanwhile, Andy convinces Beverly Ann to take him to a sheep ranch owned by her old boyfriend Roger (Noel Trevarthen). During their stay at the ranch, Roger and Beverly Ann slowly begin to rekindle their old romance and Roger shows Andy the ropes of sheep farming.

Meanwhile, Natalie is exploring the great outback with a cattle rancher named Ren (Andrew McKaige) and Tootie is viewing ancient caves with a handsome American anthropologist (Mario Van Peebles) who lets her think he is an Aborigine. Blair and Jo escape the jewel thieves and arrive at Koolunga School where they hope to find Natalie with the jewel. Natalie admits that Ren tossed the seemingly-worthless stone out of a helicopter and the thieves are arrested. The girls are all surprised to hear about one another's adventures, and Beverly Ann explains that she is not staying with Roger after all and is remaining with her "new family".

== Cast ==
- Cloris Leachman as Beverly Ann Stickle
- Lisa Whelchel as Blair Warner
- Kim Fields as Tootie Ramsey
- Mindy Cohn as Natalie Green
- Nancy McKeon as Jo Polniaczek
- Mackenzie Astin as Andy Moffett
- Mario Van Peebles as David Johnson
- Joss McWilliam as Nick Aintree
- Jay Hackett as Kevin Colton
- Andrew McKaige as Ren Calley
- Noel Trevarthen as Roger Pitt
- Misty Bernard as Jane Willis
- Barbara-Jane Cole as Miss Carstairs
- Gary Waddell as Hugo
- Nicholas Opolski

== Production ==
The Facts of Life Down Under was filmed from June to July 1986 at the following locations in Sydney and surrounding areas: Circular Quay ferry wharf, Mosman, New South Wales, Kirribilli, New South Wales, Art Gallery of New South Wales, Bradleys Head, Queen Victoria Building, Strickland House, Vaucluse, Sydney Opera House, Taronga Zoo and Uluṟu-Kata Tjuṯa National Park.

== Reception ==
The movie was both a critical and ratings success as it placed a strong #13 for the week, garnering a 17.8/27 rating (approximately 30 million viewers) and was one of the highest-rated television films of 1987. This was strategic counterprogramming by NBC, which placed the movie against the conclusion of ABC's highly publicized miniseries Amerika.

== DVD release ==
The full-length film was released on DVD on January 13, 2015, as part of The Facts of Life: The Complete Series 26-disc set.
