= Charlotte Rae =

American actress (1926–2018)

- Rae in The Facts of Life, 1980
- Born: Charlotte Rae Lubotsky; April 22, 1926; Milwaukee, Wisconsin, U.S.
- Died: August 5, 2018 (aged 92); Los Angeles, California, U.S.
- Education: Northwestern University; University of Southern California
- Occupations: Actress; comedian; singer
- Years active: 1952–2018
- Known for: Edna Garrett – Diff'rent Strokes, The Facts of Life
- Spouse: John Strauss (m. 1951; div. 1976)
- Children: 2

Charlotte Rae Lubotsky (April 22, 1926 – August 5, 2018) was an American comedic actress and singer whose career spanned 66 years.

Rae was known for her portrayal of Edna Garrett in the sitcoms Diff'rent Strokes and its spin-off, The Facts of Life (in which she had the starring role from 1979 to 1986). She received a Primetime Emmy Award nomination for Best Actress in a Comedy in 1982. She also appeared in two Facts of Life television films: The Facts of Life Goes to Paris in 1982 and The Facts of Life Reunion in 2001. She voiced the character of "Nanny" in 101 Dalmatians: The Series and Aunt Pristine Figg in Tom and Jerry: The Movie. She also appeared as Gammy Hart in Girl Meets World.

In 2015, she returned to film in the feature film Ricki and the Flash, with Meryl Streep, Kevin Kline, and Rick Springfield. In November 2015, Rae released her autobiography, The Facts of My Life, which was co-written with her son, Larry Strauss.

== Early life ==
Charlotte Rae Lubotsky was born on April 22, 1926, in Milwaukee, Wisconsin. Her parents, Esther (née Ottenstein) and Meyer Lubotsky, were Russian Jewish immigrants. Mr. Lubotsky was a retail tire business owner. Rae's mother, Esther Lubotsky, had been childhood friends with Israeli prime minister Golda Meir. Rae was the second of three sisters, in between Beverly and Miriam (called "Mimi"). For the first ten years of her life, Rae's family lived in an apartment built for them above her father's Milwaukee tire store. In 1936, her parents purchased a home for the family in nearby Shorewood, Wisconsin. She graduated from Shorewood High School in 1944.

Rae attended Northwestern University, although she did not complete her studies. While there, she met friend Cloris Leachman. Many years later, Leachman succeeded Rae on The Facts of Life for the show's last two seasons. At Northwestern she met several then unknown stars and producers, including Agnes Nixon, Charlton Heston, Paul Lynde, Gerald Freedman, Claude Akins and songwriter Sheldon Harnick. In a 2016 interview with Milwaukee Talks, she said about her decision in appearing in only dramatic television: "When I started out, I wanted to be a serious actor, I never thought I'd get into comedy." When a radio personality told her that her last name would not do, she dropped it, to her father's chagrin.

== Career ==
=== Acting ===
In 1954, Rae made her TV debut on episodes of Look Up and Live and The United States Steel Hour. This led to roles on other similar variety shows such as Armstrong Circle Theatre, Kraft Television Theatre, NBC Television Opera Theatre, The Philco Television Playhouse, The Colgate Comedy Hour, The DuPont Show of the Week, and The Phil Silvers Show.

Her first significant success was on the sitcom Car 54, Where Are You? (1961–1963), in which she played Sylvia Schnauzer, the wife of Officer Leo Schnauzer (played by Al Lewis). This was followed by roles in 'Way Out; The Defenders; Temperatures Rising; The Love Boat; The Partridge Family; Love, American Style; McMillan & Wife; Barney Miller; Phyllis; 227; Murder, She Wrote; St. Elsewhere; Diagnosis: Murder; All in the Family; and Good Times. She was nominated for an Emmy Award for her supporting role in the 1975 drama Queen of the Stardust Ballroom. In January 1975, Rae became a cast member on Norman Lear's ABC television comedy Hot l Baltimore, wherein she played Mrs. Bellotti, whose dysfunctional adult son Moose, who was never actually seen, lived at the "hot l" (the "E" on the hotel's neon sign was burnt out). Mrs. Bellotti, who was a bit odd herself, would visit Moose and then laugh about all the odd situations that Moose would get into with the others living at the hotel. Rae also appeared in season 3 of Sesame Street as Molly, the Mail Lady.

Rae was a regular on The Rich Little Show, a variety show that ran for 11 episodes in 1976.

=== Diff'rent Strokes ===
In 1978, NBC was losing to both CBS and ABC in sitcom ratings, and Fred Silverman, future producer and former head of CBS, ABC, and NBC, insisted that Norman Lear produce Diff'rent Strokes. Knowing that Rae was one of Lear's favorite actresses (in addition to Hot l Baltimore, she also appeared in a 1974 episode of All in the Family) he hired her immediately for the role of housekeeper Edna Garrett, and she co-starred with Conrad Bain in all 24 episodes of the first season. In "The Girls' School" episode, Mrs. Garrett is asked to help out at Kimberly Drummond's (actress Dana Plato) private school for girls called East Lake (later changed to Eastland). At the end of the episode, Mrs. Garrett decides to return to her housekeeping job at the Drummond residence.

=== The Facts of Life ===
In July 1979, NBC approved the spinoff based on "The Girls' School" episode from Diff'rent Strokes, to be called The Facts of Life, which would portray a housekeeper turned housemother for boarding students in a prestigious private school. The program would deal with issues facing teenagers such as weight gain and dieting, depression, drugs, alcohol, and dating. Rae had a stipulation written into her contract that said she could return to Diff'rent Strokes if the new spinoff was not successful.

After working as a character actress/comedienne in supporting roles or in guest shots on television series and specials, The Facts of Life not only gave Rae her best-known role but also finally made her a television star.

The Facts of Life had marginal ratings at first, but after a major restructuring including some cast alterations, plus a time change for the second season, the show became a ratings winner between 1980 and 1986. Between the first and second seasons, Rae went on a very stringent diet and at the start of the second season had lost an enormous amount of weight. As a result, it was briefly mentioned in the second-season premiere two-part episode "The New Girl" and in the sixth installment "Shoplifting" that Rae's character of Mrs. Garrett had also gone on a diet and lost weight. As the seasons passed, the show's success and Rae's popularity continued to grow. In 1982, Rae received an Emmy Award nomination for Best Actress in a Comedy Series for her role as Edna Garrett in The Facts of Life. However, midway through both the 1984–85 and 1985–86 seasons, the series was undergoing a gradual transition. It was at this time that Rae's appearances on the show were reduced at her request, and as a result, she was not seen in several episodes. The reason for this was that Rae felt that the girls' characters were maturing and not requiring as much of Mrs. Garrett's rearing and advice.

Towards the end of the seventh season, Rae began to contemplate leaving the series. She wanted to spend more time doing theater as well as do some traveling. The producers of the show tried to persuade Rae to continue with The Facts of Life for at least another two years, but she felt her time on the program had run its course and decided to leave at the end of the 1985–86 season. Academy and Emmy Award-winning actress Cloris Leachman was signed as her replacement. In order to help with the transition, Rae agreed to make her last appearance on the show in the two-part eighth-season premiere "Out of Peekskill". In that episode, Edna Garrett would marry, leave Peekskill with her new husband (played by Robert Mandan), and they both would move to Africa to work in the Peace Corps. In that same installment, Leachman would be introduced as Mrs. Garrett's sister, Beverly Ann Stickle, who would attend the wedding, and then with Mrs. Garrett's departure, she would then take over as a mother figure and friend for the girls. Rae and Leachman were very good friends having known each other since they were students at Northwestern University. Leachman inherited Rae's top billing in the cast and her character remained for the show's last two years. The part of Beverly Ann was quite similar to Leachman's character of Phyllis Lindstrom on The Mary Tyler Moore Show and Phyllis from the 1970s. The cast change from Rae to Leachman did not seriously affect viewership. The series continued to garner healthy ratings until it ended in the spring of 1988. NBC wanted to renew the show for a tenth season, but cast members Nancy McKeon and Mindy Cohn wanted to move on to other things.

After her departure from The Facts of Life, Rae still kept busy acting. In 1993, she voiced the villainess, Aunt Pristine Figg, in Tom and Jerry: The Movie. From 1997-98, she voiced the character of "Nanny" in 101 Dalmatians: The Series. In 2000, she starred as Berthe in the Paper Mill Playhouse production of Pippin.

In 2001, Rae, Lisa Whelchel, Mindy Cohn, and Kim Fields were reunited in a TV movie, The Facts of Life Reunion. In 2007, the entire cast was invited to attend the TV Land Awards where several members of the cast, including Rae, sang the show's theme song.

In 2007, she appeared in a cabaret show at the Plush Room in San Francisco for several performances. In the 2008 movie You Don't Mess with the Zohan, Rae had a role as an older woman who has a fling with Adam Sandler's character. On February 18, 2009, she appeared in a small role as Mrs. Ford in the Life episode "I Heart Mom". In 2015, she was in the feature film Ricki and the Flash, with Meryl Streep, Kevin Kline, and Rick Springfield. Her later career also included guest roles on shows such as The King of Queens, ER and Girl Meets World.

In a 2015 interview with Entertainment Tonight, Rae said that The Facts of Life series had an off-stage scale to weigh the girls, but that the pressure had the opposite effect producers were hoping for; "The more they tried to pressure them and weigh them and threaten them, the more they would eat. It's not the way you handle adolescence. You don't do that."

On April 19, 2011, the entire cast was reunited again to attend the TV Land Awards, where the show was nominated and won the award for Pop Culture Icon. The same day, Nancy McKeon and Kim Fields (who played Jo and Tootie, respectively) gave a speech in honor of her 85th birthday. The cast did likewise on ABC's Good Morning America, where at the end of the segment, reporter Cynthia McFadden wished Rae a happy birthday, and the cast sang the show's theme song.

=== Singing ===
In 1955, she released her first (and only) solo album, Songs I Taught My Mother, which featured "silly, sinful, and satirical" songs by Sheldon Harnick, Vernon Duke, John La Touche, Cole Porter, Rodgers & Hart and Marc Blitzstein, among others.

She appeared in Ben Bagley's revue The Littlest Revue (and on its cast album) in 1956, appearing alongside Joel Grey and Tammy Grimes, among others, and singing songs by Sheldon Harnick ("The Shape of Things"), Vernon Duke ("Summer is a-Comin' In"), and Charles Strouse and Lee Adams ("Spring Doth Let Her Colours Fly"), a parody of opera singer Helen Traubel's Las Vegas night club act, among others.

Rae later recorded Rodgers & Hart Revisited with Dorothy Loudon, Cy Young, and Arthur Siegel, singing "Everybody Loves You (When You Sleep)" and in several other duets and ensembles for Bagley's studio. Rae received two Tony Award nominations during her Broadway career. The first was in 1966 for Best Featured Actress in a Musical in Pickwick; the second came in 1969 for Best Actress in a Play for Morning, Noon and Night.

=== Theater ===
A stage actress since the 1950s, she appeared on Broadway in Three Wishes for Jamie (1952), The Threepenny Opera (1954), Li'l Abner (1956) and Pickwick (1965), among others. In 1973, Rae played the role of Southern Comfort in Terrence McNally's spoof Whiskey at Saint Clements' Theatre Off-Broadway. She appeared in The Vagina Monologues Off-Broadway in 1999.

== Personal life ==
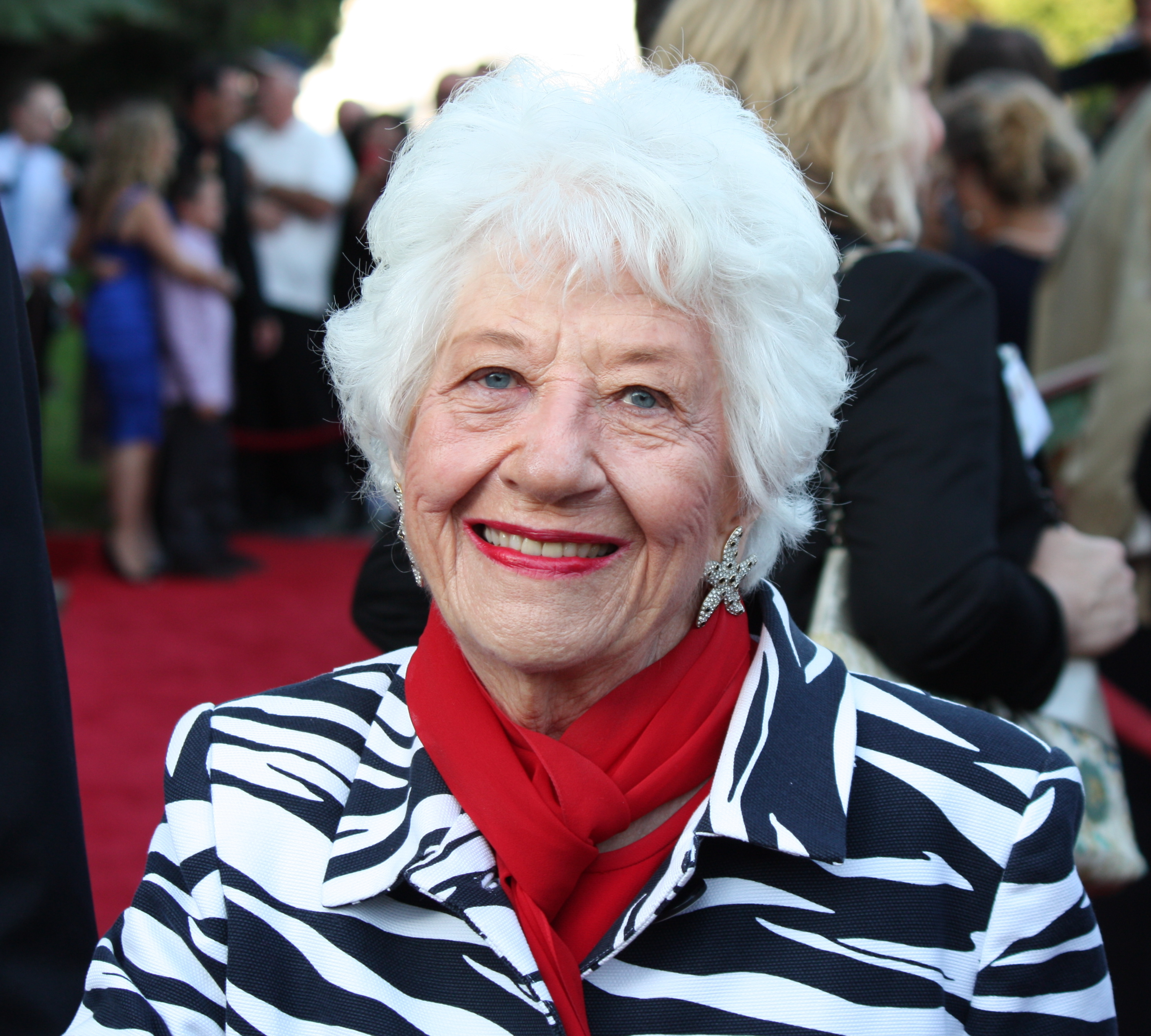
Rae in 2012.

Rae married composer John Strauss on November 4, 1951. In the mid-1970s, he came out as bisexual, and the couple divorced in 1976. Strauss died in 2011 at age 90 following a long battle with Parkinson's disease. Rae had two sons with Strauss: Lawrence, a high school teacher, and his older brother Andrew (1955–1999). Andy was autistic and suffered from epilepsy.

Rae joined Alcoholics Anonymous in the early 1970s. The organization became an important part of her personal life.

== Health issues and death ==
In 1982, Rae had a pacemaker implanted. With periodic alterations, the same pacemaker worked for over 30 years, but it stopped abruptly several years before her death. Her heart rate was around 35 beats per minute prior to entering emergency surgery to install a new pacemaker. The old pacemaker was left in place on the left side of her chest and the new, smaller pacemaker was placed on the right side. It functioned well until her death. In addition to pacemaker replacement, Rae had open-heart surgery to replace her mitral valve with a mechanical equivalent. Her left carotid artery was cleared of blockage as well.

In 2009, due to the frequency of pancreatic cancer in her own family, Rae was screened, diagnosed early, and became cancer-free after six months of chemotherapy. Her mother, an uncle, and her elder sister Beverly all reportedly died from pancreatic cancer. In 2017, aged 91, she was, however, diagnosed with bone cancer.

Rae died at her home in Los Angeles, California, on August 5, 2018. She was 92 years old.

== Filmography ==
=== Film ===
Year	Title	Role	Notes
1969	Hello Down There	Myrtle Ruth	
1970	Jenny	Bella Star	
1971	Bananas	Mrs. Mellish	
1972	The Hot Rock	Ma Murch	
1977	Sidewinder 1	Mrs. Holt	
1978	Rabbit Test	Cousin Claire	
1979	Hair	Edin the Lady in Pink	
1986	The Greatest Adventure: Stories from the Bible	Noah's Wife Christine	Short film: "Noah's Ark"; voice
1992	Tom and Jerry: The Movie	Aunt Pristine Figg	Voice
1993	Thunder in Paradise	Lola Miller	Direct to video
1997	Nowhere	Madame Maude Rae	
2000	The Tangerine Bear: Home in Time for Christmas	Mrs. Edna Caruthers	Voice; direct to video
2008	You Don't Mess with the Zohan	Mrs. Ruthie Greenhouse	
2008	Christmas Cottage	Vesta	
2012	Love Sick Love	Edna	
2015	Ricki and the Flash	Oma	
2016	Norman Lear: Just Another Version of You	Herself	Documentary
2018	Broadway: Beyond the Golden Age	Herself	Documentary

=== Television ===
Year	Title	Role	Notes
1954	The United States Steel Hour	Ramona	
1954–55	Armstrong Circle Theatre	Mrs. Ogburn / Party Snob	2 episodes
1955	Kraft Television Theatre		
1955	NBC Television Opera Theatre	Mariella	
1955	Appointment with Adventure	Beverly	
1955	The Philco Television Playhouse		
1955, 1958	The Phil Silvers Show	Flossie / Mrs. Whitney	2 episodes
1958	DuPont Show of the Month	Myrtle May	
1959	The World of Sholom Aleichem		Television film
1959	Play of the Week	The Angel Rochele	
1961	Way Out	Hazel Atterbury	
1961	From These Roots	Hilda Furman	Unknown episodes
1961–63	Car 54, Where Are You?	Sylvia Schnauser / Miss Berger	11 episodes Recurring role (Season 1–2)
1963	Look Up and Live		
1964	The Defenders	Mrs. Abeles	
1966	The Journey of the Fifth Horse	Terentievna	Television film
1966–69	New York Television Theatre	Various roles	3 episodes
1968	Pinocchio	Rosa Whale	Television film
1970	NET Playhouse		Episode: "Foul!"
1971–72	Sesame Street	Molly the Mail Lady	Main role (Season 3)
1972	Temperatures Rising	Mrs. Moscowitz	
1972	The Partridge Family	Dr. Beecher	Episode: "You're Only Young Twice"
1972	McMillan & Wife	Mrs. Drake	
1972	Love, American Style	Edna Albertson	Segment: "Love and the Clinic"
1972	The Paul Lynde Show	Aunt Rae	2 episodes
1974	Great Performances	Madame Aigreville	
1974	All in the Family	Miss Lillian Henderson	Episode: "Where's Archie?"
1974	Good Times	Ms. Rogers	Episode: "Florida's Big Gig"
1975	Queen of the Stardust Ballroom	Helen	Television film
1975	Hot l Baltimore	Mrs. Bellotti	13 episodes Main cast (Season 1)
1975	Phyllis	Shirley	Episode: "So Lonely I Could Cry"
1976	Barney Miller	Mrs. Rebecca Sobel	Episode: "The Sniper"
1976	The Rich Little Show	Herself	11 episodes
1976	All's Fair	Madge	
1977	Our Town	Mrs. Soames	Television film
1978	Szysznyk	Mrs. Dinsmore	
1978	CPO Sharkey	Mrs. Stanley	Episode: "Punk Rock Sharkey"
1978	Family	Nurse Rondo	Episode: "Magic"
1978	The Eddie Capra Mysteries	Polly	
1978	Flying High	Woman	Episode: "Fun Flight"
1978–84	Diff'rent Strokes	Edna Garrett	37 episodes Main cast (season 1–2); guest star (Season 6)
1979	Beane's of Boston	Mrs. Slocombe	Episode: "Pilot"
1979	The Triangle Factory Fire Scandal	Bessie	Television film
1979	Hello, Larry	Edna Garrett	3 episodes
1979–86	The Facts of Life	Edna Garrett	155 episodes Lead role (Season 1–7); guest star (Season 8)
1982–85	The Love Boat	Ellen van Bowe	4 episodes
1982	The Facts of Life Goes to Paris	Mrs. Edna Garrett	Television film
1985	WonderWorks: Words by Heart	Mary Tom Chism	
1986	The Worst Witch	Miss Cackle/Agatha	Television film
1987	St. Elsewhere	Proud Mary	Episode: "You Again?"
1987	Murder, She Wrote	Nettie Harper	Episode: "Doom with a View"
1988	Save the Dog		Voice role; Television film
1989	227	Millie McMillan	Episode: "Reunion Blues"
1991	Baby Talk	Aunt Beverly	Episode: "Once in Love with Cecil"
1994–95	Itsy Bitsy Spider	Adrienne Van Leydon	26 episodes Voice role; main cast (Season 1–2)
1994–95	Sisters	Mrs. Gump	3 episodes
1994	Thunder in Paradise	Lola	2 episodes
1995	Mickey: Reelin' Through the Years		Television film
1995	Can't Hurry Love	Helen	Episode: "Burning Bed"
1996	The Secret World of Alex Mack	Dave's Mother	
1997–98	101 Dalmatians: The Series	Nanny	43 episodes Voice role (Season 1–2)
1999	The Brothers Flub	Tarara Boomdeyay	Voice role 4 episodes
2000	Diagnosis: Murder	Estelle	Episode: "A Resting Place"
2001	Another Woman's Husband	Stella	Television film
2001	The Facts of Life Reunion	Mrs. Edna Garrett	Television film
2004	Strong Medicine	Maude	
2005	The King of Queens	Betty	
2008	ER	Roxanne Gaines	4 episodes
2009	Life	Mary Ford	
2011	Pretty Little Liars	Bead shop woman	Special guest star
2014	Girl Meets World	Gammy Hart	Episode: "Girl Meets World of Terror"

=== Stage ===
Year	Title	Role	Location
1952	Three Wishes for Jamie	Tirsa Shanahan	Plymouth Theatre
1954	Threepenny Opera	Mrs. Peachum	Theatre de Lys
1954	The Golden Apple	Mrs. Juniper	Alvin Theatre
1956	The Littlest Revue	Various	Phoenix Theatre
1956	Li'l Abner	Mammy Yokum	St. James Theatre
1962–63	The Beauty Part	Various	Music Box Theatre / Plymouth Theatre
1965	Pickwick	Mrs. Bardell	46th Street Theatre
1968–69	Morning, Noon and Night	Various	Henry Miller's Theatre
1970	The Chinese and Dr. Fish	Rae Mendelsohn	Ethel Barrymore Theatre
1971	Boom Boom Room	Helen	Vivian Beaumont Theatre
1988–89	Into the Woods	Jack's Mother	Various; 1st National Tour
1989	Driving Miss Daisy	Miss Daisy	Chicago
1990	Happy Days	Winnie	Mark Taper Forum
2000	Pippin	Berthe	Paper Mill Playhouse

=== Video games ===
Year	Title	Role
2010	Red Dead Redemption	The Local Population

== Discography ==
Studio albums

- Songs I Taught My Mother (1955)
- Kurt Weill's The Threepenny Opera (1956)

== Published works ==
- The Facts of My Life (2015), co-written with her son, Larry Strauss

== Awards and nominations ==
Year	Award	Category	Nominated work	Results	Ref.
2017	Looking Ahead Awards	The Shirley Temple Award	—N/a	Won	
1975	Primetime Emmy Awards	Outstanding Single Performance by a Supporting Actress in a Comedy or Drama Special	Queen of the Stardust Ballroom	Nominated	
1982	Primetime Emmy Awards	Outstanding Lead Actress in a Comedy Series	The Facts of Life	Nominated	
1966	Tony Awards	Best Supporting or Featured Actress in a Musical	Pickwick	Nominated	
1969	Tony Awards	Best Leading Actress in a Play	Morning, Noon and Night	Nominated	
2011	TV Land Awards	Pop Culture Award (shared with cast)	The Facts of Life	Won	
