= Mindy Cohn =

American actress (born 1966)

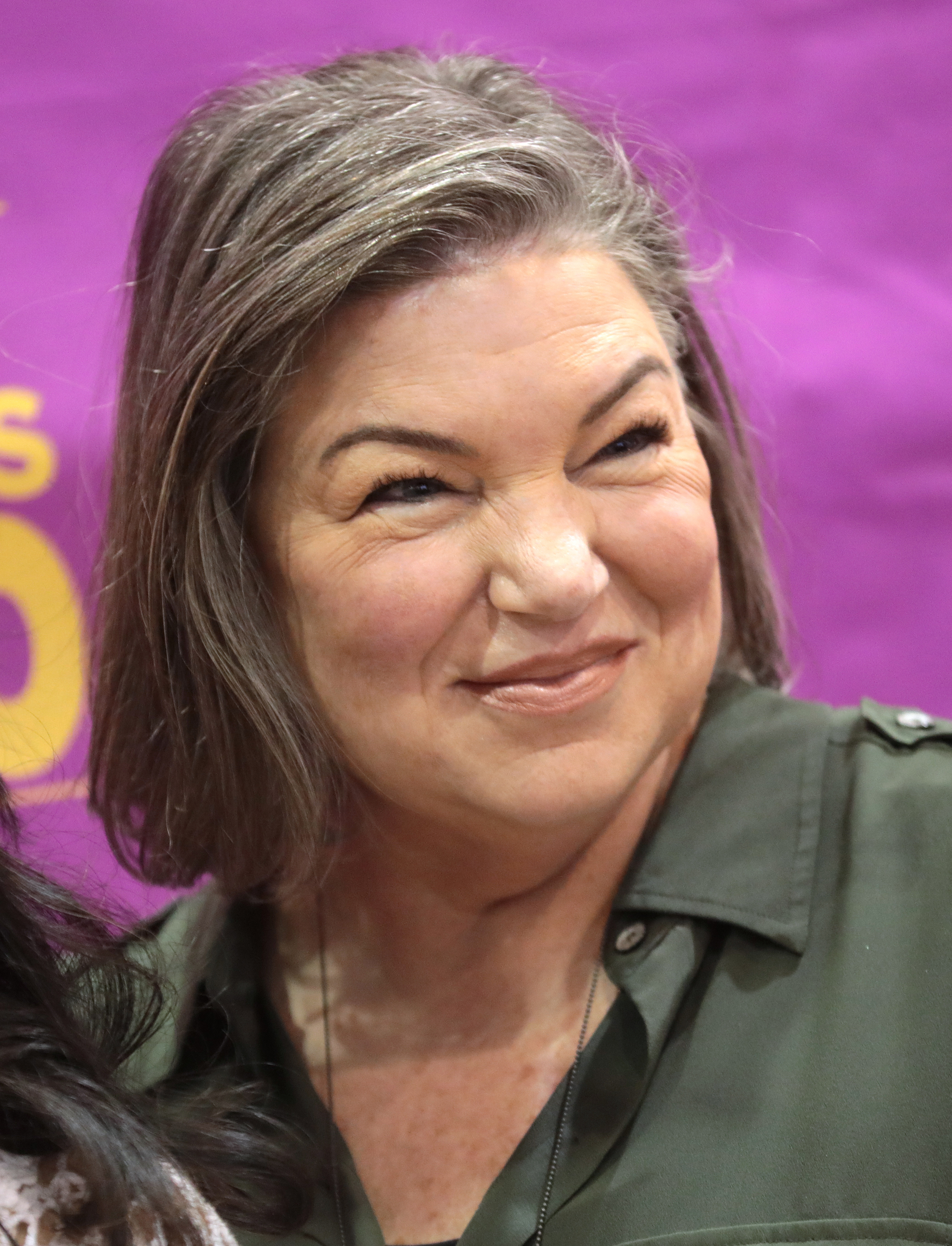
- Cohn in October 2019
- Born: Melinda Heather Cohn; May 20, 1966 (age 60); Los Angeles, California, U.S.
- Education: Loyola Marymount University
- Occupations: Actress; comedian
- Years active: 1979–present
- Known for: The Facts of Life; Scooby-Doo; The Kids from Room 402

Melinda Heather Cohn (born May 20, 1966) is an American actress and comedian. She starred as Natalie Green in the sitcom The Facts of Life from 1979 to 1988, and is known for voicing Velma Dinkley in the Scooby-Doo franchise from 2002 to 2015, succeeding B. J. Ward, before being succeeded herself by Kate Micucci. Cohn appeared on VH1's List of "100 Greatest Kid Stars".

== Early life ==
Melinda Heather Cohn was born in Los Angeles in 1966 and was raised Jewish.

== Career ==
Cohn was discovered by actress Charlotte Rae when Rae and the producers of The Facts of Life visited Westlake School in Holmby Hills, California, while doing research for the show; she had been asked by the principal to be a student tour guide for the group, who found themselves enchanted by her natural comic instincts as she led them around the campus. Cohn was cast as Natalie Green and portrayed the character for the series' nine-year run (1979–1988), as well as in the reunion movie (2001). In 2013, she commented on Charlotte Rae's lobbying on her behalf: "Mr. Reynolds calls me into his office. It seemed that Charlotte Rae had fallen madly in love with me, in part because I reminded her of her best childhood friend Natalie—and I was irrepressible, charming, and hilarious. So she asked the producers to create a part for me in the show. Honestly, the whole thing seemed so fantastic I didn't know what to think." After the show, she remained friends with Rae. Two months before Rae's birthday in 2016, when Cohn was unavailable to attend The Facts of Life reunion interview, she sent Rae a video message praising her decades-long friend for teaching her the craft of acting. Cohn said that one of the reasons she did The Facts of Life Reunion in 2001 was that the actresses in the long-running 1980s series have been wrongly denied a cut of the syndication and DVD profits from the series. "We all never got paid and still don't get paid for DVDs and reruns... we felt we were owed."

Cohn has continued her acting career outside of The Facts of Life. In 1984 she had a leading role as the daughter alongside Stockard Channing in RKO's video production of Table Settings. In 1986, she appeared in The Boy Who Could Fly as next-door neighbor Geneva. She also had guest appearances in other popular TV shows, including Charles in Charge (playing Buddy's sister Bunny, a young alcoholic, in the 1988 episode "Bottle Baby"), and two guest appearances in the second season of the cop drama 21 Jump Street (playing Rosa in the 1987 episode "Christmas In Saigon" and the 1988 episode "Chapel of Love"). In 2004 Cohn appeared in the WB comedy The Help. In 2010, Cohn played the role of Violet, the leading character in Casper Andreas's movie Violet Tendencies, and appeared on the Season 8 premiere of TLC's What Not to Wear on October 29, 2010. She appeared in an episode of Hot in Cleveland on July 13, 2011, on The Secret Life of the American Teenager on March 26, 2012, in Judson Theatre Company's Bell, Book and Candle in 2013, and in The Middle on May 21, 2014. Cohn reprised her Velma Dinkley role in Lego Dimensions. From 2024 to 2026, she has played Ann Holiday on Apple TV's Palm Royale.

== Personal life ==
Mindy Cohn is a breast cancer survivor, having been diagnosed with it in 2012 and was declared cancer-free in 2017. She announced her cancer went into remission in late April 2026 and later stated she beat it again in May of the same year. Cohn is a strong supporter of the LGBT community and has stated that she is proud to be a "fag hag". She has a degree in cultural anthropology from Loyola Marymount University and is a founding member of the weSpark cancer support center.

== Accolades ==
In 2003, Cohn was nominated for a Daytime Emmy Award for her work on the TV show What's New, Scooby-Doo?, for which she provided the voice of Velma Dinkley. She reprised her role of Velma on Scooby-Doo! Mystery Incorporated and in several other Scooby-Doo movies.

Cohn received a positive notice from Variety for her role in the 2007 Daniel Waters comedy film Sex and Death 101. In 2023, she received an Indie Series Award for her voice acting roles in season 2 of Around the Sun.

== Filmography ==
=== Actress ===
Year	Title	Role	Notes
1979–88	The Facts of Life	Natalie Green, Frenchie	Main cast (201 episodes)
1980–81	Diff'rent Strokes	Natalie Green	Episodes: "The Slumber Party", "The Older Man"
1982	The Facts of Life Goes to Paris	Natalie Green	TV film
1985	Double Trouble	Janie Blakemore	Episode: "Funny Girl"
1986	The Boy Who Could Fly	Geneva Goodman	Feature film
1987	The Facts of Life Down Under	Natalie Green	TV film
1987–88	21 Jump Street	Rosa Banducci	Episodes: "Christmas in Saigon", "Chapel of Love"
1988	Charles in Charge	Bunny Lembeck	Episode: "Bottle Baby"
1991	Dream On	Marie	Episode: "Toby or Not Toby"
1993–94	The Second Half	Maureen Tucker	Main cast (13 episodes)
1999	Suddenly Susan	Cindy	Episode: "Revenge of the Gophers"
1999	The Chimp Channel	Candy Yuponce (voice)	Main cast (13 episodes)
2001	Alone with a Stranger	Toni	Feature film
2001	Virtually Casey	Joanne Collins	TV film
2001	The Facts of Life Reunion	Natalie Green	TV film
2002	Under the Gun	Gale	Feature film
2003	One on One	Ms. Sorel	Episode: "Daddy, I Don't Need an Edumacation"
2003	Swing	Martha	Feature film
2004	The Help	Maggie, the Cook	Main cast (7 episodes)
2005	The Adventures of Tango McNorton: Licensed Hero	Lunch Lady	Short film
2005	The Third Wish	Bridgette	Feature film
2007	Sex and Death 101	Trixie	Feature film
2010	Violet Tendencies	Violet	Feature film
2011	Hot in Cleveland	Cassie	Episode: "Love Thy Neighbor"
2012	The Secret Life of the American Teenager	Dylan's Mom	Recurring role (8 episodes)
2013	Holiday Road Trip	Artie	TV film
2014	The Middle	Kimberly	Episode: "The Wonderful World of Hecks"
2014	Operation Marriage	Kathy	Short film
2014	Bones	Valentina	Episode: "The Puzzler in the Pit"
2014	FreakMe	April	TV pilot episode (unaired)
2015	You're Killing Me	Karen	Feature film
2016	Worst Cooks in America	Herself (contestant)	Worst Cooks in America 9 (8 episodes)
2016	A Cinderella Christmas	Zelda	TV film
2017	Hollywood Dirt	Thelma	Feature film
2018	Fly	Air Traffic Controller Camille Fields	Recurring role (8 episodes)
2018	Long Island Medium	Herself	
2019	You Light Up My Christmas	Rose	TV movie features surviving original cast of The Facts of Life. Not a "The Facts of Life" Christmas movie.
2020	A Nice Girl Like You	Priscilla Blum	Feature film
2021	Live in Front of a Studio Audience	Herself	Episode: "The Facts of Life and Diff'rent Strokes"
2024–2026	Palm Royale	Ann Holiday	2 seasons, recurring role
2024	Mother Father Sister Brother Frank	Joy Jennings	Feature film
2025	Hearts Around the Table Jenna's First Love	Angie	
2026	Influenced	Tess	Feature film

=== Voice work ===
Year	Title	Voice role	Notes
1999–2001	The Kids from Room 402	Nancy Francis	TV series (34 episodes)
2002–2006	What's New, Scooby-Doo?	Velma Dinkley	TV series (41 episodes)
2003	Dexter's Laboratory	Librarian	Episode: "Voice Over/Blonde Leading the Blonde/Comic Stripper"
2003	Kim Possible	Ms. Whisp	Episode: "Naked Genius"
2004	Scooby-Doo! and the Loch Ness Monster	Velma Dinkley	Direct-to-video film
2005	Aloha, Scooby-Doo!	Velma Dinkley	Direct-to-video film
2005	Scooby-Doo! in Where's My Mummy?	Velma Dinkley	Direct-to-video film
2006	Scooby-Doo! Pirates Ahoy!	Velma Dinkley	Direct-to-video film
2006	Family Guy	Natalie Green	Episode: "Prick Up Your Ears"
2006	Shaggy & Scooby-Doo Get a Clue!	Velma Dinkley	Episodes: "Shags to Riches" and "Almost Ghosts"
2007	Chill Out, Scooby-Doo!	Velma Dinkley	Direct-to-video film
2008	Scooby-Doo! and the Goblin King	Velma Dinkley	Direct-to-video film
2009	Scooby-Doo! and the Samurai Sword	Velma Dinkley	Direct-to-video film
2010	Scooby-Doo! Abracadabra-Doo	Velma Dinkley	Direct-to-video film
2010–13	Scooby-Doo! Mystery Incorporated	Velma Dinkley	TV series (52 episodes)
2010	Scooby-Doo! Camp Scare	Velma Dinkley	Direct-to-video film
2011	Batman: The Brave and the Bold	Velma Dinkley / Ticket Girl	Episode: "Bat-Mite Presents: Batman's Strangest Cases!"
2011	Scooby-Doo! Legend of the Phantosaur	Velma Dinkley	Direct-to-video film
2012	Scooby-Doo! Music of the Vampire	Velma Dinkley	Direct-to-video film
2012	Scooby-Doo! Spooky Games	Velma Dinkley	Direct-to-video short
2012	Big Top Scooby-Doo!	Velma Dinkley	Direct-to-video film
2012	Scooby-Doo! Haunted Holidays	Velma Dinkley	Direct-to-video short
2013	Scooby-Doo! Mask of the Blue Falcon	Velma Dinkley	Direct-to-video film
2013	Scooby-Doo! Stage Fright	Velma Dinkley	Direct-to-video film
2013	Scooby-Doo! and the Spooky Scarecrow	Velma Dinkley	Direct-to-video short
2013	Scooby-Doo! Mecha Mutt Menace	Velma Dinkley	Direct-to-video short
2014	Scooby-Doo! WrestleMania Mystery	Velma Dinkley	Direct-to-video film
2014	Scooby-Doo! Ghastly Goals	Velma Dinkley	Direct-to-video short
2014	Scooby-Doo! Frankencreepy	Velma Dinkley	Direct-to-video film
2015	Scooby-Doo! Moon Monster Madness	Velma Dinkley	Direct-to-video film
2015	Scooby-Doo! and the Beach Beastie	Velma Dinkley	Direct-to-video short
2015	Scooby-Doo! and Kiss: Rock and Roll Mystery	Velma Dinkley	Direct-to-video film
2022–23	Around the Sun	Aunt Nora / Molly	Audio drama (3 episodes)

=== Video games ===
Year	Title	Role	Notes
2002	Scooby-Doo! The Glowing Bug Man	Velma Dinkley	Voice role
2003	Scooby-Doo! The Scary Stone Dragon	Velma Dinkley	Voice role
2003	Scooby-Doo! Mystery Mayhem	Velma Dinkley	Voice role
2005	Scooby-Doo! Unmasked	Velma Dinkley	Voice role
2006	Scooby-Doo! Who's Watching Who?	Velma Dinkley	Voice role
2006	Scooby-Doo! Frights Camera Mystery	Velma Dinkley	Voice role
2009	Scooby-Doo! First Frights	Velma Dinkley	Voice role
2010	Scooby-Doo! and the Spooky Swamp	Velma Dinkley	Voice role
2014	Scooby-Doo and Looney Tunes Cartoon Universe: Adventure	Velma Dinkley	Voice role
2015	Lego Dimensions	Velma Dinkley	Voice role

Preceded by B. J. Ward	Voice of Velma Dinkley; 2002–2015, 2017	Succeeded by Stephanie D'Abruzzo
