= The Facts of Life (TV series) =

American television sitcom (1979–1988)

- Genre: Sitcom
- Created by: Dick Clair; Jenna McMahon
- Developed by: Howard Leeds; Ben Starr; Jerry Mayer
- Starring: Charlotte Rae; Lisa Whelchel; Kim Fields; Mindy Cohn; Nancy McKeon; John Lawlor; Jenny O'Hara; Felice Schachter; Julie Piekarski; Julie Anne Haddock; Molly Ringwald; Pamela Segall; Mackenzie Astin; George Clooney; Cloris Leachman; Sherrie Krenn; Geri Jewell; Ryan Cassidy
- Theme music composer: Al Burton; Gloria Loring; Alan Thicke
- Opening theme: "The Facts of Life"
- Country of origin: United States
- Original language: English
- No. of seasons: 9
- No. of episodes: 201 (list of episodes)

Production
- Executive producers: Jack Elinson (seasons 2–7); Jerry Mayer (seasons 3–6); Linda Marsh; Margie Peters (seasons 5–6); Deidre Fay; Stuart Wolpert (seasons 6–7); Irma Kalish; Richard Gurman (seasons 8–9)
- Producers: Jerry Mayer (seasons 1–3); Linda Marsh; Margie Peters (seasons 3–4); Rita Dillon (seasons 5–9); Kimberly Hill (season 6)
- Camera setup: Videotape; Multi-camera
- Running time: 22 minutes
- Production companies: T.A.T. Communications Co. (seasons 1–3); Embassy Television (seasons 4–7); Embassy Communications (seasons 8–9); ELP Communications (season 9); Columbia Pictures Television (season 9)

Original release
- Network: NBC
- Release: August 24, 1979 – May 7, 1988

Related
- The Facts of Life Reunion; Diff'rent Strokes

The Facts of Life is an American television sitcom created by Dick Clair and Jenna McMahon that originally aired on NBC for nine seasons from August 24, 1979, to May 7, 1988. A spin-off of Diff'rent Strokes, the series follows Charlotte Rae as Mrs. Edna Garrett as she becomes a housemother and later dietitian at the fictional Eastland School, an all-girls boarding school in Peekskill, New York.

The first season featured a large ensemble cast that was quickly trimmed, with main co-stars throughout the majority of the series consisting of Lisa Whelchel as Blair Warner, Kim Fields as Tootie Ramsey, Mindy Cohn as Natalie Green, and Nancy McKeon as Jo Polniaczek. The premise of The Facts of Life changed numerous times throughout the course of its run, coinciding with the changing lives of its young characters. From the fifth season onward, the setting of the series shifted from the Eastland School to a storefront that Mrs. Garrett turns into a bakery called Edna's Edibles, which later becomes a pop culture gift shop called Over Our Heads run by the girls. Additional co-stars added to the main cast throughout the series' run include Pamela Adlon, Mackenzie Astin, George Clooney, and Sherrie Krenn. In 1986, Rae left the series and was replaced by Cloris Leachman as Mrs. Garrett's sister Beverly Ann Stickle, who serves as the series' main star for its final two seasons.

Initially not a ratings success, The Facts of Life went on to become one of NBC's highest-rated series of the 1980s, becoming the network's highest-rated comedy series in its third season. A 1988 opinion poll conducted by USA Today found that the series was among the top ten most beloved programs among American teenagers at the time. Three television films based on the series were also aired, including The Facts of Life Goes to Paris (1982) and The Facts of Life Down Under (1987) on NBC, and The Facts of Life Reunion (2001) on ABC. The Facts of Life was nominated for three Primetime Emmy Awards throughout its run, including a nomination for Outstanding Lead Actress in a Comedy Series for Rae in 1982.

== Plot ==
=== Season 1 ===
The first season title card (1979–1980)

A spin-off of Diff'rent Strokes, the series featured the Drummonds' former housekeeper Edna Garrett (Charlotte Rae) working in a new job as the housemother of a dormitory at Eastland School, a private all-girls school in Peekskill, New York. The girls in her care included spoiled rich girl Blair Warner (Lisa Whelchel); the youngest, gossipy Dorothy "Tootie" Ramsey (Kim Fields), and impressionable Natalie Green (Mindy Cohn).

The backdoor pilot for the show was originally aired as the last episode of the first season of Diff'rent Strokes and was called "The Girls' School (a.k.a. Garrett's Girls)." The plot line for the pilot had Kimberly Drummond (Dana Plato) requesting that Mrs. Garrett help her sew costumes for a student play at the East Lake School for Girls, the school Kimberly attended in Upstate New York, as her dorm's housemother had recently quit.

Mrs. Garrett agrees to help, puts on a successful play and also solves a problem for the boyfriend-obsessed Nancy Olsen (Felice Schachter) as she also meets Blair; Tootie; Sue Ann Weaver (Julie Piekarski), a small-town girl from Kansas; and the budding social activist Molly Parker (Molly Ringwald). Mrs. Garrett is asked to stay on as the new housemother but says she would rather continue working for the Drummonds at the end of the pilot.

After the backdoor pilot, the name of the school was changed to Eastland and new characters were added with Natalie, athletic tomboy Cindy Webster (Julie Anne Haddock), and Mr. Bradley becoming part of the main group featured. Although Kimberly Drummond is featured as a student at Eastland, her character did not cross over to the spinoff series with Mrs. Garrett. In the show's first season, episodes focus on the issues of seven girls, with the action usually set in a large, wood-paneled common room of a girls' dormitory. Also appearing was the school's headmaster, Mr. Steven Bradley (John Lawlor) and Miss Emily Mahoney (Jenny O'Hara), an Eastland teacher who was dropped after the first four episodes. Early episodes of the show typically revolve around a central morality-based or "lesson teaching" theme. The show's pilot episode plot included a storyline in which Blair Warner insinuates that her schoolmate Cindy Webster is a lesbian, because she is a tomboy and frequently shows affection for other girls. Other season one episodes deal with issues including drug use, sex, eating disorders, parental relationships, and peer pressure.

=== Seasons 2–8 ===
The producers felt that there were too many characters given the limitations of the half-hour sitcom format and that the plotlines should be more focused to give the remaining girls more room for character development. Four of the original actresses—Julie Anne Haddock (Cindy), Julie Piekarski (Sue Ann), Felice Schachter (Nancy) and Molly Ringwald (Molly)—were written out of the show, although the four did make periodic guest appearances in the second and third seasons, and all but Molly Ringwald appeared in one "reunion" episode in the eighth season. Mr. Bradley's character was also dropped and replaced by Mr. Charles Parker (Roger Perry). Mr. Parker appeared in episodes through the beginning of season 5. In addition to being housemother to the remaining girls, Mrs. Garrett became the school dietitian as the second season began. Jo Polniaczek (Nancy McKeon), a new student originally from the Bronx, arrived at Eastland on scholarship. A run-in with the law forced the four to be separated from the other girls and work in the cafeteria, living together in a spare room next to Mrs. Garrett's bedroom. The season two premiere of the retooled series saw an immediate ratings increase. By its third season (1981–82), Facts of Life had become NBC's No. 1 comedy and No. 2 overall NBC program, beating its predecessor, Diff'rent Strokes, for the first time.

In 1983, Jo and Blair graduated Eastland Academy in the highly anticipated season four finale "Graduation". To keep the four girls under one roof, in the season five premiere, "Brave New World", Mrs. Garrett went into business for herself and opened a gourmet food shop named Edna's Edibles. The four girls came to live and work with Mrs. Garrett in the new refreshed space. In September 1985, NBC moved the seventh season of the series to its burgeoning Saturday night lineup at 8:30, as a lead-in for the new series The Golden Girls at 9 pm. In an attempt to refresh the "ratings work horse" and increase ratings, George Clooney was added to the regular cast and Mrs. Garrett's store was gutted by fire in the season seven premiere "Out of the Fire". The follow-up episodes "Into the Frying Pan" and "Grand Opening" had the girls rebuilding the store with a pop culture-influenced gift shop, called Over Our Heads. The changes proved successful as all three episodes placed in the top ten ratings each week. By the end of the season, TV Guide reported, "Facts' success has been so unexpected that scions of Hollywood are still taken aback by it... Facts has in fact been among NBC's top-ranked comedies for the past five years. It finished twenty-seven overall for the 1985–1986 season, handily winning its time slot against its most frequent competitors, Airwolf and Benson. Lisa Whelchel stated, 'We're easily overlooked because we've never been a huge hit; we just sort of snuck in there.'"

Charlotte Rae initially reduced her role in seasons six and seven and later decided to leave the series altogether, believing she had done all she could do with her character and desiring to move on to other projects. In season eight's heavily promoted one-hour premiere, "Out of Peekskill" Mrs. Garrett married the man of her dreams and joined him in Africa while he worked for the Peace Corps. Mrs. Garrett convinces her sister, Beverly Ann Stickle (Cloris Leachman), to take over the shop and look after the girls. The character of Beverly Ann had a similar personality to Leachman's previous Emmy-winning role as Phyllis Lindstrom on two 1970s CBS sitcoms–The Mary Tyler Moore Show and Phyllis. Beverly Ann later legally adopted Over Our Heads worker Andy Moffett (Mackenzie Astin) in the episode "A Boy About the House". Describing the new changes to The Facts of Life, Brandon Tartikoff, the president of NBC Entertainment, said he "was surprised that The Facts of Life performed well this season, as, with a major cast change and all, I thought it might not perform as it had in the past. Facts has been renewed for next season."

=== Final season ===
In the ninth and final season, the series aired on NBC's Saturday lineup at 8 pm; NBC still had confidence in the series, making it the 8 p.m. anchor, kicking off the network's second-highest rated night (after Thursdays). For the February Nielsen rating sweeps, the writers created a controversial storyline in this season for the episode titled "The First Time". Natalie became the first of the girls to lose her virginity. Lisa Whelchel refused to do this storyline that would have made her character, not Natalie, the first among the four young women in the show to lose her virginity. Having become a Christian when she was ten, Whelchel would not say the lines because of her religious convictions. Whelchel appeared in every episode of the show but asked to be written out of "The First Time". The episode ran a parental advisory before it began and placed 22nd in the ratings for the week. With the show still easily winning its timeslot, NBC had made plans to renew The Facts of Life for a tenth season but two castmates—Mindy Cohn and Nancy McKeon—chose to leave at the conclusion of season nine. NBC cancelled the Facts of Life but used the two-part series finale ("The End of the Beginning"/"The Beginning of the Beginning") to serve as a backdoor pilot for a new series in which Blair became the new headmistress of Eastland when she purchased the school to prevent it from closing.

== Cast ==
Main cast of The Facts of Life
Actor	Character	Seasons								
Actor	Character	1	2	3	4	5	6	7	8	9
Charlotte Rae	Edna Garrett	Main	Main	Main	Main	Main	Main	Main	Guest	
John Lawlor	Steven Bradley	Main								
Jenny O'Hara	Emily Mahoney	Main (Note: O'Hara's character was dropped after the fourth episode, "I.Q.".)								
Lisa Whelchel	Blair Warner	Main	Main	Main	Main	Main	Main	Main	Main	Main
Felice Schachter	Nancy Olsen	Main	Recurring	Recurring					Guest	
Julie Piekarski	Sue Ann Weaver	Main	Recurring	Recurring					Guest	
Kim Fields	Tootie Ramsey	Main	Main	Main	Main	Main	Main	Main	Main	Main
Molly Ringwald	Molly Parker	Main	Guest							
Julie Anne Haddock	Cindy Webster	Main	Recurring	Recurring					Guest	
Mindy Cohn	Natalie Green	Main	Main	Main	Main	Main	Main	Main	Main	Main
Nancy McKeon	Jo Polniaczek		Main	Main	Main	Main	Main	Main	Main	Main
Geri Jewell	Cousin Geri Warner		Recurring	Recurring	Recurring	Recurring				
Pamela Segall	Kelly Affinado					Main				
Mackenzie Astin	Andy Moffett						Recurring	Main	Main	Main
George Clooney	George Burnett							Main	Recurring	
Cloris Leachman	Beverly Ann Stickle								Main	Main
Sherrie Krenn	Pippa McKenna									Main (Note: Krenn was introduced in "Up from Down Under", the sixth episode of season 9, as a recurring character. She was promoted to the main cast beginning with the episode "Something in Common".)

== Production ==
=== Development ===
The Facts of Life was produced first by T.A.T. Communications Company, later known as Embassy Television (Norman Lear's production companies) and then as Embassy Communications and Columbia Pictures Television (through ELP Communications) on January–May 1988 episodes of the series. Sony Pictures Television currently owns the distribution rights to the sitcom. From 1979 until 1982 the show was produced at Metromedia Square in Los Angeles. In 1982, production moved to Universal City Studios and then to Sunset Gower Studios in 1985.

=== Theme music ===
The show's theme song was composed by Al Burton, Gloria Loring, and her then-husband, Alan Thicke. The first season lyrics began "There's a place you gotta go / For learnin' all you ought to know / About the facts of life," sung partly by the cast.

Later seasons opened with "You take the good, you take the bad / You take them both, and there you have / The facts of life," sung by Loring. The original lyrics shifted to the closing credits before being dropped entirely. Burton, Loring, and Thicke had previously composed the theme to Diff'rent Strokes.

== Episodes ==
Season	Episodes	Originally released	
Season	Episodes	First released	Last released
Pilot		May 4, 1979	
1	13	August 24, 1979	June 11, 1980
2	16	November 19, 1980	March 25, 1981
3	24	October 28, 1981	May 5, 1982
4	24 + movie	September 25, 1982	May 4, 1983
5	26	September 21, 1983	May 9, 1984
6	26	September 26, 1984	May 15, 1985
7	24	September 14, 1985	May 10, 1986
8	24 + movie	September 27, 1986	May 9, 1987
9	24	September 26, 1987	May 7, 1988
Reunion		November 18, 2001	

=== Television films ===
==== The Facts of Life Goes to Paris ====
The Facts of Life Goes to Paris, a two-hour TV movie in which Mrs. Garrett and the girls travel to France, aired September 25, 1982. It ranked 22nd for the week, with an 18.1 rating and a 31 share. The movie was later added to the American syndication package, separated into four half-hour episodes; however, the original cut of the film appears on the Season 4 DVD set in 2010. The TV movie was directed by Asaad Kelada.

==== The Facts of Life Down Under ====
The Facts of Life Down Under, another two-hour TV movie, aired Sunday, February 15, 1987, placing a strong No. 13 for the week garnering 21.4/32. This was strategic counterprogramming by NBC, which placed the movie against the conclusion of ABC's highly publicized miniseries Amerika. The Telemovie was also syndicated as four half-hour episodes in later U.S. airings.

==== The Facts of Life Reunion ====
The Facts of Life Reunion, a two-hour TV movie reunion aired on ABC November 18, 2001, in which Mrs. Garrett and the girls are reunited in Peekskill, New York, for the Thanksgiving holiday. It occasionally aired in the United States on ABC Family. Nancy McKeon (Jo) did not appear in the movie due to scheduling conflicts with her then-TV series, The Division; her character's absence is explained as being on assignment as a police officer.

== Syndication ==
NBC aired daytime reruns of The Facts of Life from December 13, 1982, until June 28, 1985, at 10 a.m. (and later noon) on the daytime schedule. Episodes aired on television stations nationwide from September 15, 1986, to September 10, 1993, then aired on the USA Network on and off from September 13, 1993 to September 11, 1998. In August 1994, the network celebrated the show's 15th anniversary with a day-long marathon of 14 episodes featuring new interviews with Rae, Welchel and Cohn.

Episodes aired on Nick at Nite from September 4, 2000, to June 28, 2001, although the network did not air certain episodes that contained highly mature content during primetime (including the first-season episode "Dope"), instead opting to air episodes with more serious topics at late night/early morning times. TV Land aired 48 hours of The Facts of Life episodes on its "Fandemonium Marathon Weekend" on November 17–19, 2001. The Hallmark Channel aired The Facts of Life from July 1 to November 1, 2002. Episodes were available on Comcast's Video-On-Demand service from August 8, 2005, to July 31, 2006, and again from the August 6, 2007 until Tube Time's shutdown date on December 31, 2009. On July 16, 2008, full episodes and short "minisodes" of The Facts of Life became available online via Hulu.

On March 12, 2012, TeenNick added the series to their morning lineup; however, the series' addition to the channel was short-lived, as it left the schedule on April 3, 2012. The series premiered on The Hub on April 2, 2012, where it rerun until March 22, 2013, and later moved to Logo TV, airing it in random timeslots. In 2017, Facts aired on MeTV, alongside its parent show Diff'rent Strokes until they were both removed in late 2019.

Antenna TV started airing The Facts of Life on January 2, 2020, before it later moved to sister station Rewind TV when it launched on September 1, 2021. It later returned to Antenna in January 2024, currently airing weekdays at 3:00 & 3:30 p.m. EST and Sundays from 7:00 a.m. to 9:00 a.m. EST. As of March 2022, the series has also been airing in daily blocks and on Saturdays in day long marathons on the GAC Family (later Great American Family) cable network. Also as of March 30, 2023, seasons one through nine are currently available on Tubi.

== International airings ==
- In Brazil, the show aired on Nick at Nite as Vivendo e Aprendendo (Living and Learning in English).
- In Latin America and Mexico, the show aired as Los Hechos de la Vida aired on The Warner Channel and Nick at Nite.
- In Italy, seasons one through five were aired in 1983–1986 (dubbed as usual in Italian), on the terrestrial television network Canale 5, the first Italian commercial network, and later on other local commercial television networks. The Italian version was named L'albero delle mele, which means The apple tree (the word "apple" is popularly used euphemistically in Italian as a reference to teenage girls).
- In France, seasons one to nine (dubbed in French and titled Drôle de vie) which means Funny Life, aired in 1987 until 1988 on the terrestrial television network La Cinq, and seasons one to nine aired on TF1 from 1991 until 1996 as part of a block called Club Dorothée.
- In the United Kingdom, unlike Diff'rent Strokes, The Facts of Life has never aired on terrestrial television. A few seasons aired on the UK BSB satellite channels, and after BSB merged with Sky Television, the entire series was shown on Sky One.
- In Canada, The Facts of Life was a mainstay on CBC Television–the Canadian public broadcaster, airing concurrently with the NBC airings as well as weekdays in stripped reruns at 4:00 p.m. (4:30 p.m. in Newfoundland) until April 1992. Crossroads Television System (CTS), a Christian-based network, aired it from September 2006 to 2009. Beginning on September 15, 2007, The Facts of Life aired weekends at 10:00 a.m. and 2:00 p.m. on Canwest's digital specialty channel, DejaView, which later moved it to weekdays at 4:00 p.m. and 4:30 p.m. in March 2010. As of 2019, Hamilton, Ontario-based CHCH currently airs the series on weekdays at 4:00 p.m. (Eastern Time). The entire series is also currently available for online streaming on CTV.ca, as part of an ad-supported video on demand service called CTV Throwback.

== Reception ==
=== Ratings ===
The Facts of Life was originally not a ratings winner on Friday nights in its summer debut in 1979 or in its second tryout in the spring of 1980. It ranked 70th out of 105 shows on the air in the year-end Nielsen ratings, with an average 15.8 rating. The show was put on hiatus and extensively retooled in preparation for season two. In November 1980, season two of The Facts of Life premiered in a Wednesday 9:30 p.m. time slot, where it immediately flourished, peaking in January 1981 with a 27.4 rating and 41 share; it ranked No. 4 for the week. The program became NBC's fourth highest-rated scripted series, after Little House on the Prairie, Diff'rent Strokes and CHiPs.

By the third season, the series moved time slots to 9:00 pm. Wednesdays and soon became NBC's highest-rated comedy series and NBC's No. 2 overall series, after Real People. For its seventh season, it moved to Saturdays at 8:30 p.m., to bolster the premiering series The Golden Girls at 9 p.m. in the newly formed Saturday night comedy block. At the start of the eighth season, the series was moved forward a half-hour to the toughest time slot on television–Saturday at 8 pm, which brought the ratings down from its season seven high. The series easily won its time slot and garnered high numbers in the coveted teen and 18–49 demographics.

One of the highest rated season eight episodes saw the original season one cast return for a mini-reunion. Titled "The Little Chill", it placed No. 19 for the week with an 18.2 rating and 31 share. In the article "Ratings Top with Teens" appearing in the January 19, 1988 edition of USA Today, The Facts of Life was ranked as one of the top 10 shows in a survey of 2,200 American teenagers.

=== Nielsen Ratings ===
- 1979–1980 – #70
- 1980–1981 – #26
- 1981–1982 – #24
- 1982–1983 – #32
- 1983–1984 – #25
- 1984–1985 – #30
- 1985–1986 – #27
- 1986–1987 – #31
- 1987–1988 – #37

=== Awards ===
- Emmy Award nomination for Best Actress (1982) – Charlotte Rae
- Emmy Award nomination for Outstanding Technical Direction/Electronic Camerawork/Video Control for a Series (1986) – for episode "Come Back to the Truck Stop, Natalie Green, Natalie Green".
- Emmy Award nomination for Outstanding Achievement in Hairstyling for a Series (1987) – for episode "'62 Pickup".
- TV Land Award for Pop Culture Icon in 2011.

== Home media ==
In April 2001, Columbia House released The Facts of Life: The Collector's Edition, a 10-volume "Best of" the series on VHS, 40 episodes in all. With the advent shortly thereafter of TV on DVD and Columbia House's eventual move from the direct marketing model of exclusive series, the tapes were discontinued. Sony Pictures Home Entertainment released the first two seasons on DVD in Region 1 in May 2006 with new interviews with most of the cast, including first season regulars Felice Schachter and Julie Anne Haddock. To promote the DVD's release, McKeon, Weichel and Cohn appeared together on TV shows such as Entertainment Tonight, Today, and CNN Showbiz to reminisce about their time on the show and talk about their lives presently. Unfortunately, Fields was unable to take part due to other commitments.

The third season was released in October 2006. This release failed to match the success of the first and second seasons, sales-wise. The first and second seasons were released in Region 4 in March 2007. In 2010, Shout! Factory acquired the rights to the series and released the fourth season on Region 1 DVD in May 2010. Special features include The Facts of Life Goes To Paris, a made-for-TV-movie (which originally aired a few days prior to the fourth season debut) and a "Know The Facts: Trivia Game." They then released seasons five to nine on DVD.

Mill Creek Entertainment re-released the first and second seasons on DVD in May 2014. It is unknown as to whether or not Mill Creek will release any further seasons. In January 2015, Shout! Factory released The Facts of Life – The Complete Series on DVD in Region 1. The 26-disc set contains all 201 episodes of the series as well as the two made-for-TV films (The Facts of Life Goes to Paris and The Facts of Life Down Under) and other bonus features including an all-new cast reunion. The Facts of Life Reunion film is not included in this collection and has yet to be released on DVD.

DVD name	Ep #	Release date
The Complete First and Second Seasons	29	May 9, 2006; May 20, 2014 (re-release)
The Complete Third Season	24	October 24, 2006
The Complete Fourth Season	23	May 4, 2010
The Complete Fifth Season	26	November 2, 2010
The Complete Sixth Season	26	June 9, 2015
The Complete Seventh Season	24	October 20, 2015
The Complete Eighth Season	24	January 26, 2016
The Complete Ninth Season	24	May 17, 2016
The Complete Series	201	January 13, 2015

== Attempted spin-offs ==
The various attempts at spin-offs were backdoor pilots, which were shown as episodes of The Facts of Life.

- "Brian & Sylvia"– A season two episode in which Tootie and Natalie go to Buffalo, New York to visit Tootie's Aunt Sylvia, a black woman (played by Rosanne Katon) who has recently married a white man, played by Richard Dean Anderson (the future star of MacGyver and Stargate SG-1). Ja'Net DuBois of Good Times played Ethel, who was both Tootie's grandmother and Sylvia's mother. The episode never developed into a series and in the season five episode "Crossing the Line", Tootie mentions Brian's and Sylvia's interracial marriage and says that the two have recently gotten divorced.
- "The Academy"– A season three episode set at Stone Academy, an all-boys military school that was near Eastland. In this episode, the girls at Eastland attended a dance with the boys from the military school. The boys included actors Jimmy Baio, Ben Marley, David Ackroyd, Peter Frechette, and John P. Navin Jr.
- "Jo's Cousin"– Another season three episode, in which Jo visits her family in the Bronx, including her cousin Terry, a fourteen-year-old girl (played by Megan Follows) going through adolescence in a family full of men. The family included actors Grant Cramer, John Mengatti, Donnelly Rhodes, and D.W. Brown.
- "The Big Fight"– A season four episode set at Stone Academy, a boys' military school. Natalie comes to visit a boy who tries to impress her with his boxing. This episode includes the same cast from the season three episode "The Academy", with the addition of '80s 'nerd' icon Eddie Deezen.
- "Graduation"– This spin-off was to revolve around Blair and Jo's life at Langley College.
- "Big Apple Blues"– A season nine episode in which Natalie spends the night with a group of eccentric young people living in a SoHo loft, and decides to remain in New York to begin her life. Two of the tenants in the loft were played by David Spade and Richard Grieco.
- "The Beginning of the End/Beginning of the Beginning" – The two-part series finale sees Blair buying Eastland to prevent its closing. Blair finds that the school is in such dire financial straits that she is forced to make the school co-ed. Blair then essentially adopts the Mrs. Garrett role as she presides over the school and is forced to deal with the trouble-making students in a plot line that is highly reminiscent of the season two premiere. The new Eastland students included Seth Green, Mayim Bialik, Meredith Scott Lynn, and future Oscar-nominee Juliette Lewis.

== Cancelled revival ==
After the re-creation of an episode of the series in a 2021 Live in Front of a Studio Audience special, Mindy Cohn said Norman Lear suggested a revival because the special was so popular. Cohn claimed in a July 2024 interview on Jeff Lewis Live on SiriusXM that the new series was well into the planning stages when one cast member she would not name went behind the other actresses and tried to secure a separate deal for a spinoff for that actress's character. It created an enormous rift between the group and the deal was pulled. Although Cohn suggested she and the unnamed co-star talk again, she said the revival is "very dead."
