= List of The Facts of Life characters =

This is a list of characters from the NBC sitcom The Facts of Life.

== Characters table ==
Main cast of The Facts of Life
Actor	Character	Seasons								
Actor	Character	1	2	3	4	5	6	7	8	9
Charlotte Rae	Edna Garrett	Main	Main	Main	Main	Main	Main	Main	Guest	
John Lawlor	Steven Bradley	Main								
Jenny O'Hara	Emily Mahoney	Main (Note: O'Hara's character was dropped after the fourth episode, "I.Q.".)								
Lisa Whelchel	Blair Warner	Main	Main	Main	Main	Main	Main	Main	Main	Main
Felice Schachter	Nancy Olsen	Main	Recurring	Recurring					Guest	
Julie Piekarski	Sue Ann Weaver	Main	Recurring	Recurring					Guest	
Kim Fields	Tootie Ramsey	Main	Main	Main	Main	Main	Main	Main	Main	Main
Molly Ringwald	Molly Parker	Main	Guest							
Julie Anne Haddock	Cindy Webster	Main	Recurring	Recurring					Guest	
Mindy Cohn	Natalie Green	Main	Main	Main	Main	Main	Main	Main	Main	Main
Nancy McKeon	Jo Polniaczek		Main	Main	Main	Main	Main	Main	Main	Main
Geri Jewell	Cousin Geri Warner		Recurring	Recurring	Recurring	Recurring				
Pamela Segall	Kelly Affinado					Main				
Mackenzie Astin	Andy Moffett						Recurring	Main	Main	Main
George Clooney	George Burnett							Main	Recurring	
Cloris Leachman	Beverly Ann Stickle								Main	Main
Sherrie Krenn	Pippa McKenna									Main (Note: Krenn was introduced in "Up from Down Under", the sixth episode of season 9, as a recurring character. She was promoted to the main cast beginning with the episode "Something in Common".)

== Main characters ==
=== Edna Garrett ===
Edna Garrett
- Diff'rent Strokes and The Facts of Life character
- First appearance: "Movin' In" (Diff'rent Strokes) "Rough Housing" (The Facts of Life)
- Last appearance: "The Facts of Life Reunion"
- Portrayed by: Charlotte Rae

In-universe information
- Aliases: Mrs. Garrett, Mrs. G
- Occupation: Housekeeper; Housemother; Dietician; Businesswoman
- Spouses: Robert Garrett (divorced); Dr. Bruce Gaines (1986–, widowed before 2001 reunion)
- Children: Alex Garrett (son); Raymond Garrett (son)
- Relatives: Beverly Ann Stickle (sister); Andy Moffett (adoptive nephew)

Edna Ann Garrett Gaines, known as Mrs. Garrett or Mrs. G, is played by the actress Charlotte Rae from 1978 to 1986. Garrett is the youngest child in a large family, born and raised on a farm near Appleton, Wisconsin. Her exact age is never disclosed during the series but on several occasions, it was hinted or implied that she was somewhere in her fifties. On Diff'rent Strokes, she was the housekeeper to the Drummond family in New York City after Willis and Arnold's mom Lucy (the Drummonds' original housekeeper) died. In season 1 of The Facts of Life, she is shown to have taken a job as house mother at the Eastland School for Girls in Peekskill, New York (Kimberly Drummond attended Eastland). Over the years, Mrs. Garrett's role on The Facts of Life changes. At first, she is merely a live-in supervisor for the girls of Eastland; in the second season she became their in-house dietitian who managed the school's cafeteria.

Mrs. Garrett's two marriages ended, respectively, in divorce and in her husband's death. One early episode centered around an unsuccessful attempt at reconciliation by her ex-husband, Robert Garrett, who was revealed to be a compulsive gambler; Edna concluded that his addiction would always be an obstacle. She had two sons by Robert: Alex (Tom Fitzsimmons), a singer/songwriter/carpenter born in 1953, and Raymond (Joel Brooks), an accountant who appeared in one Season 5 episode ("Edna's Edibles") to help her raise funds and lease space to open a gourmet food shop. The girls, who had previously lived with Mrs. Garrett at Eastland and worked with her in the kitchen to pay off various restitution-related expenses (see below), moved into the living space attached to the shop and continued to work for her there, this time as payrolled employees.

In season 7, Edna's Edibles was extensively damaged by fire; it was rebuilt as a gift shop called Over Our Heads. Since the insurance on Edna's Edibles was insufficient to rebuild it by the time of the fire, the girls contributed their insurance claim checks to help rebuild, effectively making Mrs. Garrett and the girls equal partners in the business. Edna Garrett was a mentor to the girls at Eastland, functioning in loco parentis. At times the girls would take her for granted and forget that Edna herself had problems. Many times Edna would lash out at the girls when they got careless with her. In one episode, she actually fires them from Edna's Edibles when their irresponsible behavior ends up costing her $500 in fines after a dismal health inspection. She hires them back the next day when the girls promise her that they will be more responsible at their jobs. She also fires George, when he falls behind on his work constructing Over Our Heads but they later make up. Mrs. Garrett is a Democrat. She is also against censorship, such as book banning.

Mrs. Garrett gets remarried in season 8. She and her new husband, Dr. Bruce Gaines (Robert Mandan), rejoin the Peace Corps to work in eastern Africa (Charlotte Rae's contract had expired and she did not want to continue with the series). Edna was replaced by her sister, Beverly Ann Stickle (Cloris Leachman), who needs a place to stay. However, in the reunion movie that aired in 2001, Mrs. Garrett reunites with Blair, Natalie, and Tootie (Jo has to work) at a Peekskill hotel owned by Blair, and which is run by Mrs. Garrett's son, Raymond. It is also revealed that Mrs. Garrett and Tootie are widows. It's revealed that Mrs. Garrett is in a romantic relationship with a ship captain.

Mrs. Garrett also appears on the Hello, Larry episode "The Trip", the first of three crossovers between the shows Diff'rent Strokes and Hello, Larry.

=== Blair Warner ===
Blair Warner
- First appearance: The Girls School (Diff'rent Strokes) "Rough Housing" (The Facts of Life)
- Last appearance: "The Facts of Life Reunion"
- Portrayed by: Lisa Whelchel

In-universe information
- Occupation: Student; Businesswoman
- Spouse: Tad Warner
- Relatives: David Warner, Jr. (father); Monica Warner Eloise Hoffdale, née Blair (mother); Meg Warner (half-sister); Bailey Hoffdale-Warner (sister); Geri Warner (cousin); Hon. Carlton Blair (maternal grandfather; deceased); David Warner, Sr. (paternal grandfather)

Blair Warner is played by Lisa Whelchel. Blair is 14-years-old in the series' pilot episode; an episode in the 1985–1986 season centered on her 21st birthday.

In season one, Blair is portrayed as a rich and rebellious girl from a blue blood background. She is seen smoking cigarettes, drinking beer, and enjoying great popularity with boys. Unlike many of her classmates, she is looking to lose her virginity. When the show was retooled in the second season, all instances of her rebellion were either dropped or given to the new character of Jo Polniaczek. Blair was rewritten as an extremely wealthy and unashamedly spoiled "daddy's girl" and socialite from Manhattan

Throughout the show, Blair is shown to be intelligent, scoring barely below Jo on the Eastland entrance exam. At Eastland, she wins most awards and is seen to be a talented artist. At Langley College, she passes her law school LSATs with only one weekend of studying. Blair is often characterized as vain, arrogant, and shallow, with her self-interest regularly played for laughs. However, especially by the later seasons of the show, she is shown to be funny, emotional, generous, and loving to Mrs. Garrett and her friends, especially Jo Polniaczek.

Blair's chief foil is Jo, who appears in the show's second season. At first, the two are portrayed as rivals and complete opposites, with Blair from her privileged background, and Jo as a street-smart Bronx native. Once Jo arrives at Eastland, her witty verbal sparring matches and arguments with Blair are a regular feature on the show, especially in the first few seasons. However, as the episodes continue, viewers quickly see Blair begin sticking up for and standing by Jo in her time of need (and vice versa), with their relationship evolving into a dueling sisters dynamic. In the second episode of season two, Jo can already be seen defending Blair from someone who attempts to steal her expensive watch while the girls are in a holding cell. Later in the same season, Blair nearly attacks an old boyfriend when she learns he tried to assault Jo and, in other episodes, she tries to stop Jo from going through with a teenage marriage.

As the show progresses, Jo and Blair develop a close friendship, although they continue to trade wisecracks and sarcastic comments, usually good-naturedly. In the ninth season episode "Down and Out in Malibu: Part 1", Jo introduces Blair as her best friend. She later asks Blair to be her maid of honor.

Jo and Blair experience many emotionally charged moments throughout the series, highlighting the complexity and back-and-forth nature of their friendship. In other episodes, Blair's former step sister Meg (played by Eve Plumb) visits Eastland to tell Blair that she is going to become a nun. In “Best Sister Part 1" and “Best Sister Part 2" it's revealed that Blair is an atheist because when she asked God to not allow her parents' divorce to become final, her prayer wasn't answered. In "Best Sister Part 2," Blair and Jo get into a fight when Blair's stepsister inspires Jo to consider becoming a nun, too. Worried she'll ruin her life, and also angry by her personal disbelief in religion, Blair lashes out at Jo, who hits her in response. The episode ends with Jo apologizing to Blair and promising she'll never do that again.

In the season nine episode, "Less Than Perfect", Blair is in a car accident and reveals her fears regarding her scars only to Jo, who goes into her hospital room after hours in order to see that she's okay. This moment marked a turning point for how Blair viewed herself and her desire to be perfect. Initially, Blair felt she needed to be seen as perfect, because she is the heiress to her father's multimillion-dollar business, Warner Textile Mills. In the hospital, she privately tells Jo a story from her childhood to illustrate how her mother had insisted she be perfect from a young age. In the uncut version of the episode that was released on the DVD sets, Jo is shown having a conversation with Casey, Blair's then-boyfriend, while waiting in the hospital waiting room. Casey asks Jo why they care so much about Blair, despite her vanity and shallowness. Jo tells Casey, "Because she's Blair, and there's nobody else like her."

In the season four episode "Magnificent Obsession," Jo stays up all night with Blair in an attempt to keep her from calling an emotionally abusive boyfriend, in another moment where Blair worries about her need to be seen as a perfect by a guy who talked only about her flaws.

However, Blair's delusions of grandeur are usually played for laughs as Natalie, Tootie, or Jo make sarcastic remarks about her "beauty," "perfect" personality," or "naturally blonde hair." Any crisis at Eastland would usually prompt a suggested solution from Blair, preceded by her catch phrase: "I just had another one of my brilliant ideas!" More often than not, though, her "brilliant ideas" were actually quite the opposite, although on at least two occasions they turned out to actually be good (In the episode "Growing Pains", it was her idea to have Mrs. Garrett punish them after Tootie gets drunk on wine that Blair, Jo and Natalie were responsible for instead of going to the headmaster, which would have resulted in all of them being expelled. In "The Four Musketeers", it was her idea to move back into the room and work in the kitchen to pay off the debt incurred when she and the other girls get into a paint fight while painting the room.). She also says this on occasion to be sarcastic, particularly with Jo. For example, she said her catchphrase once while Jo was distractedly mopping the cafeteria floor and followed it up with "if you move your feet around while mopping, we just might be done by lunchtime."

Blair's parents (played by Nicolas Coster and Marj Dusay) are shown to be divorced, and although she doesn't usually show it, Blair wishes to have a nuclear family like all of her friends. Later in the series, her mother remarries (for the fourth time) and gives birth to a baby girl (Bailey) fathered by her most recent ex-husband. Originally, Blair's mother did not want to go through with the pregnancy, which upset Blair, who was excited about being a sister. She becomes her mother's labor coach when Bailey is born on Christmas Day.

A secret Blair originally kept from her friends was that her cousin Geri (played by comedian Geri Jewell) had cerebral palsy. She is not embarrassed by her cousin, but rather jealous of her, since Blair is used to being the center of attention. Mrs. Garrett tells Blair not to lash out against Geri because of her jealousy and Blair joins Geri, a successful comedian, onstage at an impromptu comedy show Geri throws at Eastland Academy.

In the episode "Legacy," Blair, initially enthusiastic about a library being built with her family's funds and named after her late maternal grandfather, Judge Carlton Blair, thus immortalizing the name "Blair," is horrified to learn her grandfather had been a member of the Ku Klux Klan. The revelation devastates Blair and makes her question all her assumptions about her supposed "superiority," even though Jo assures her, "You're not prejudiced; you're a snob." She almost withdraws the library funding to avoid commemorating her grandfather, but finally agrees to let it be built so long as it is not given the "Blair" name.

In season four, Blair is showing graduating Eastland and, in season five, attending nearby Langley College with Jo. She considers a career in fashion or art, but ultimately graduates with a plan to study law. She gives the graduating speech at Langley after Jo, who is supposed to give the speech, is denied the chance by the college due to her speech's content. Jo had planned to give an honest speech about the real world outside of college, but the administration wanted something more uplifting. Despite the college's disapproval, Blair ends up reading Jo's speech instead of her own.

During her years at Langley, Blair works with Jo, Natalie, Tootie, and Mrs. Garrett at Mrs. Garrett's bakery, Edna's Edibles, and later, their gift shop, Over Our Heads. After graduating from Langley as an undergraduate, she studies for the LSATs with Jo's help and passes the exam. She then enrolls in Langley's law school. In season 9, she purchases the local community center where Jo is employed as a social worker in order to save the facility. Throughout the season, she can be seen going over the community center's budget and managing its financials. In "On the Edge," she jokes about giving Jo an advance on her salary.

In the series finale, she purchases the financially troubled Eastland Academy and turns it into a co-educational school. These final episodes were originally meant to introduce a new spin-off series that would have had Blair running Eastland. However, the series wasn't picked up.

In the 2001 TV movie The Facts of Life Reunion, Blair refers to herself as a lawyer. She is still wealthy and owns a hotel empire (Warner Enterprises) with her husband, Tad, managed by Mrs. Garrett's son, Raymond. In the movie, the girls gather at one of Blair's hotels, The Peekskill Inn, located near Eastland, which Blair had previously sold. Jo's daughter calls her “Aunt Blair," emphasizing their still-close relationship. At the end of the movie, Tad is volunteering at a children's home, which makes Blair realize she's ready to have children. She and Tad discuss both having and adopting children.

Note: Actress Geri Reischl ("fake Jan" of The Brady Bunch Hour) was originally given the role of Blair Warner in the television pilot Garrett's Girls (later renamed The Facts of Life) but was forced to give it up due to her contract with General Mills.

=== Tootie Ramsey ===
Tootie Ramsey
- First appearance: The Girls School (Diff'rent Strokes) "Rough Housing" (The Facts of Life)
- Last appearance: "The Facts of Life Reunion"
- Portrayed by: Kim Fields

In-universe information
- Occupation: Student; Businesswoman; Talkshow host Broadway performer
- Spouse: Jeff Williams (deceased)
- Children: Tisha Williams (daughter)
- Relatives: Harrison "Rifle" Ramsey (father); Paula/Diane Ramsey (mother); Marshall Ramsey (brother); Ethel (maternal grandmother)

Dorothy "Tootie" Ramsey is played by Kim Fields. She is the youngest of the main characters at the age of 12 until 21 and is the only black girl in the class. She and her family hail from Washington, D.C., where her parents worked as lawyers. Tootie’s dream is to become an actress. She attends Eastland Academy for most of the show's run. Tootie's most-remembered attributes are her penchant for rollerskates (at first used by Facts of Life producers to mask Fields' short stature), her gossipy nature, and her braces. In real life, Fields had to wear braces for three years, finally having them removed in 1984, after the show begins the sixth season.

A lot of Tootie's gossip lands her and her friends in trouble. She is notable for her catchphrase, "We are in trou-ble! " Tootie is involved in all issue-based storylines. For example, Tootie befriends a boy named Fred who insists that she only associate with black people, in an attempt to realize "her true roots." In another episode, Tootie is chosen by a photographer to model for newspaper advertisements, but is instead lured into a borderline kiddie porn operation and is saved by Mrs. Garrett at the last minute. During a trip to New York, Tootie is almost strong-armed into prostitution before Mrs. Garrett finds her and takes her home. In another episode, she struggles again with racial issues when her best friend Natalie dates a relative of hers and Tootie intervenes, causing conflict between her and Natalie. Tootie's favorite singer is Michael Jackson's older brother Jermaine Jackson. Tootie helps Mrs. Garrett with her bakery, Edna's Edibles, after-school and, in the later seasons, works full-time at the gift shop, "Over Our Heads", after she graduates from high school in 1986.

In the 2001 The Facts of Life Reunion TV movie, Tootie had attended the Royal Academy of Dramatic Arts in the UK city of London to pursue an acting career, is a Hollywood-based talk show host, and is the single mother of Tisha, a 10-year-old (fathered by her longtime boyfriend and later deceased husband, Jeff Williams). After her visit to Peekskill, Tootie (who now prefers to be called "Dorothy") decides to quit her talk show, Waking Up with Dorothy, and move to New York to take up the theater, but not until becoming the co-owner of the Peekskill Playhouse. Tisha Williams remains in Peekskill to attend Eastland Academy (no longer owned by Blair) and continue the family tradition.

In addition to the Diff'rent Strokes episode "The Girls School" that serves as the backdoor pilot for The Facts of Life, Tootie also appears in "The Slumber Party", "The Bank Job", "First Day Blues" and "The Team".

=== Natalie Green ===
Natalie Green
- First appearance: "Rough Housing" (The Facts of Life)
- Last appearance: "The Facts of Life Reunion"
- Portrayed by: Mindy Cohn

In-universe information
- Occupation: Student; Reporter; News producer
- Spouse: Harper Jason (fiancée)
- Relatives: Dr. Sy Green (father; deceased); Evelyn "Evie" Green (mother); Ellen Manheim (biological mother); Mona Green (paternal grandmother)

Natalie Green is played by Mindy Cohn. Natalie's best friend is Tootie; they are close in age. Natalie's age is 12 at the series' beginning. Natalie's most defining physical attribute is that she is large-figured but she had a healthy self-image, once quoted as saying, "Who wants to be a skinny pencil? I'd rather be a happy Magic Marker!" Natalie is Jewish, as Mindy Cohn is in real life. Her faith is featured in several episodes. In one, she celebrated Chanukah while the others celebrated Christmas. Her heritage is highlighted when her father, Dr. Green, dies unexpectedly; Natalie's bottled-up grief is a continuing storyline.

Natalie is the only one of the girls who is adopted. In one episode, Blair successfully tracks down Natalie's birth mother but Natalie - who realizes that her adoptive parents are her true parents, even though they aren't biologically related to her —chooses not to answer the phone and hear the results of the search, instead inviting her friends to taste the cake "my mother made." However, after an argument with her adoptive mother in season 4's "Mommie Dearest," the subject arises again. Her adoptive mother tells Natalie the name of her biological mother. Natalie locates and meets her, but as before, Natalie still considers the mother who reared her to be her mother.

Although she isn't a mold-fitting "traditional beauty," Natalie is involved in many storylines regarding sex. In an early episode, she dates a boy who spreads a rumor that Natalie is easy. In another episode, she is almost sexually assaulted on the way back from a costume party. In the controversial episode "The First Time," toward the series' end, she becomes the first of the girls to have sex when she sleeps with her boyfriend Snake on their first anniversary as a couple. A budding writer, she writes for the Eastland School newspaper. Natalie graduates from Eastland in 1985, in "Bus Stop" (Season 6, Episode 25). She delays attending college for a year to travel across the country by bus, leaving family and friends dismayed because she is postponing Princeton. At the year's end, she decides to attend Langley College, and she becomes a reporter for the local newspaper in Peekskill. Towards the end of the series, she goes to New York City and decides to stay and pursue her writing career. The episode in which she inspects the SoHo loft she will eventually call home features Richard Grieco and David Spade as her future roommates. The episode (aired in 1988) was originally set up for Mindy Cohn to transition into a spinoff series, but the plans did not materialize.

In the TV-movie The Facts of Life Reunion, she is revealed to be a television news producer at CNN and is also involved with two different men, neither of whom knows of the other. Her boyfriends, Robert and Harper, are willing, for a short time, to compete for her heart. Though her friends deem Robert the winner, Natalie eventually chooses Harper; Robert accepted this and parted with Natalie on good terms.

Natalie also appears in two episodes of Diff'rent Strokes: "The Slumber Party" and "The Older Man."

=== Jo Polniaczek ===
Jo Polniaczek
- First appearance: "The New Girl, pt. 1"
- Last appearance: "The Beginning of the Beginning"
- Portrayed by: Nancy McKeon

In-universe information
- Occupation: Student; Businesswoman; Police detective
- Spouse: Rick Bonner
- Children: Jamie Bonner (daughter)
- Relatives: Charlie Polniaczek (father); Rose Polniaczek (mother); Josef Polniaczek (paternal grandfather); Sal Largo (uncle); Paul, Bud, and Terry Largo (cousins); Mike Polniaczek (cousin)

Joanna Marie "Jo" Polniaczek is played by Nancy McKeon. The character of Jo is first introduced in the second season at 15-years-old, arriving at the Eastland Academy on her motorcycle. Jo is Polish American and from the Bronx. She comes from an economically disadvantaged background. Early on, she is portrayed as rebellious, but also highly intelligent (she and Blair achieved the highest scores on the Eastland entrance exams), as well as secretly sensitive.

Her backstory is that Jo's mother sent her to Eastland after she, in response to difficulties between her parents, had joined a gang known as the "Young Diablos" in her hometown. As the show continues, Jo becomes less angry and hostile toward others. She is ultimately shown to be extremely protective and loyal toward her new friends, particularly Blair Warner.

At first, she clashes with her assigned roommate, Blair; the two come from completely different backgrounds and have completely different personalities. Their fighting and sarcastic comments to one another become a key feature of the show. However, her relationship with Blair deepens and matures over time, and the two eventually become close friends, with Jo referring to Blair as her best friend by the ninth season. The two continue to argue, trade wisecracks, and good-naturedly make fun of each other from time to time.

Jo and Blair share many emotional moments throughout the series, showcasing the intensity and complexity of their relationship. In the first episode of season 2, not long after meeting Blair for the first time and wrecking the school's van, Jo defends Blair when another girl in their jail cell attempts to steal her watch. Later in the same episode, Blair defends Jo from a classmate by shoving the classmate's face into a pie. In season 9, when Blair is in a car accident, she is vulnerable only with Jo, who sneaks into her hospital room after visiting hours are over (and is the first person by her side after the accident), about her fears regarding her scars. In several episodes, such as when Jo considers leaving Eastland, when she decides not to get married as a teenager, and in The Facts of Life Goes to Paris, she openly cries in front of Blair, despite her tough image.

In season 2's "Double Standard", Blair becomes upset when a guy, Harrison, asks Jo to a country club dance instead of asking her. Later, when Blair finds out that Harrison tried to assault Jo, she nearly attacks him, with Jo holding her back. A subsequent conversation between Jo and Blair makes them suddenly realize that although they have different backgrounds they can still have the same problems. This was another moment that shifted their perspectives on each other and furthered their friendship. In season 3's "New York, New York," Jo and Blair return to New York City to see friends from their former neighborhoods. At the end of the trip, they realize that they have each changed, while their friends have stayed the same.

In the season 4 episode "Ain't Miss Beholden", Jo learns that she will lose her scholarship due to budget cuts. She learns that the only scholarship she qualifies for is offered by Blair's family and due to her belief that Blair would hold it over her for the rest of her life (as well as her general discomfort in asking for help), she refuses to apply. Blair is at first unconcerned, but Natalie explains that Jo will not be returning the following year due to the cost of attending the school, making Blair realize the seriousness of Jo's situation. Blair secretly sends in the application for Jo and she gets the scholarship. Angry because Blair went behind her back, Jo expects to be in Blair's debt, only to have Blair explain that the sole reason for her doing it was because she didn't want Jo to leave. She says she expects nothing in return except for the cost of the postage for sending it in. She also emphatically states that regardless of how badly they antagonize each other, she can admit they're friends, regardless of whether Jo can admit it. Jo admits they are, marking the first time they express it outright.

In "The New Girl Part 1," Jo convinces the girls to steal the school van and use fake IDs to buy drinks at a bar. The van is wrecked and the girls are forced to work in the Eastland cafeteria to make up the repair costs. In the second episode "The New Girl Part 2", the girls are placed on academic probation and are forced to live across the hall from Mrs. Garrett's room above the cafeteria for a year. In season 3, when the punishment expires, all four girls find other living arrangements, but are responsible for cleaning and painting their former room. While painting, their friendship begins to rekindle, culminating into an all-out paint fight. This severely damages the hardwood floor, which requires expensive repairs. The girls decide to move back in together and continue to work in the kitchen to pay off the bill for the damaged floor.

Another problem for Jo comes when she, Tootie, and Natalie go to a store to buy a blouse as a gift for Mrs. Garrett's birthday. Jo shoplifts the blouse while a very reluctant Tootie and Natalie participate. Mrs. Garrett is subsequently arrested when she goes to exchange the blouse for a smaller size, not knowing the garment is stolen. Jo has to work off the payment of that blouse while Tootie and Natalie are forced to do her chores at the school during that time.

Also early in the series, Jo's sailor boyfriend, Eddie Brennan (Clark Brandon), comes to Eastland and convinces her to marry him. They plan to elope to West Virginia, where the marriage age in 1980 was lower, but Mrs. Garrett and Blair track her down at a nearby motel to stop her. Jo had by that point already begun to change her mind when she realized just how difficult teenage marriage would be. Jo returns to Peekskill without Eddie.

Eddie visits again the following season, but things have changed between them. They are moving in different directions and keeping the long-distance relationship going is proving to be very difficult, so they decide to see other people for the time being. Eddie returns late in the fifth season, now an officer in the Navy, but Tootie discovers he is married to a girl in Italy. Clark Brandon's last appearance is in the 5th season's 23rd episode "Seems Like Old Times".

In the 15th episode of the 4th season called "Teacher's Pet", Jo develops a close friendship with her 26-year-old English teacher, Miss Gail Gallagher (played by Deborah Harmon), who was raised in a similar environment to Jo. Gail inspires Jo to think about becoming a teacher herself. When Jo learns from Blair that Gail is quitting Eastland, she becomes very disappointed, believing that the reason is for a higher-paying job. She is crushed when she finds out from Mrs. Garrett that it is because of a terminal illness and has a difficult time coming to terms with her emotions and friendship.

In seasons 2-4, many of Jo's stories revolve around her tomboyish ways. Jo gets into verbal spars with girls who don't think she is "feminine enough" and boys (including some of her boyfriends) are threatened by her mechanical aptitude, which she displays by getting a job at a local garage. When a guy working with her is intimidated by her abilities, Blair encourages Jo to ask him for help with something in order to feed his ego. Jo pretends to be unable to fix a motorcycle in order to win his interests. When Blair sees this, she tells Jo that she didn't mean for her to pretend she knows nothing. She tells her that it isn't right seeing her pretend like she doesn't know how to fix motorcycles. Jo responds by being true to who she is, telling the guy that she does actually know what is wrong with the bike. While her mechanical aptitude continues, Jo's gruff image softens as the seasons progress and as she matures over the course of the show. In later seasons, she is sometimes shown wearing skirts and high heels.

In season four, Jo graduates from Eastland as valedictorian of her class, and in season five, she attends Langley College with Blair. She soon loses her access to the college dorms due to the expense. She sneaks into Blair's dorm for awhile, staying with her, despite Blair offering to give her money and encouraging her to apply for assistance through the college. The dean eventually finds out that Jo has been trying to stay in the dorms despite not paying for them and places her on probation. She ends up going to live with Mrs. Garrett, Natalie, and Tootie (Blair eventually joins them, too), while working at Edna's Edibles, which later becomes the shop, Over Our Heads. At Edna's Edibles, she is in charge of finances and can often be seen helping Mrs. Garrett with the logistics of running the bakery.

In college, she works at the campus radio station and is on the Board of Regents. She graduates from Langley with a degree in education, initially considering becoming a teacher. In some episodes, she is seen student teaching. She graduates with honors and is asked to be the speaker on graduation day. When the college isn’t happy with the honest speech she plans to give, Blair is asked to step in and give a speech, instead. Blair ultimately gives Jo’s speech instead of her own.

When the series ends, she is working at a community center owned by Blair. Jo had asked Blair to donate money to keep the facility open for the clients in need. The experience leads Jo to consider becoming a social worker and she is seen working at the community center through the rest of the series.

Regarding her romances, during Season 6, Jo meets and romances a young rock singer named Flyman (played by Michael Damian) in the two-part episode, "Gone With the Wind". She is reunited with him in Season 7, where it is revealed he now has a lounge act in Atlantic City. Also in season 6, she forms a relationship with her photography professor and helps him care for his young son. Her relationship interferes with her ability to enjoy typical college activities and causes her to repeatedly cancel plans with Blair and her friends. Jo breaks up with him so that she can have time to enjoy her individuality.

In the last season, Jo marries Rick Bonner, a concert musician. She asks Blair to be her maid of honor. In the 2001 reunion special set after the series ends, it is revealed that Jo has a twelve-year-old daughter, Jamie. Jamie refers to Blair as "Aunt Blair" and her appearance on the reunion is similar to Jo's first appearance on the show.

Jo does not appear in the 2001 reunion TV special because it is stated that she is now a police detective and had to suddenly travel to Los Angeles in order to escort a material witness in a federal trial. This mirrors Nancy McKeon's then-role on the Lifetime Network show The Division, in which she played a police detective in California. News reports from 2000 and 2001 report that there were originally plans for the reunion movie to revolve around Jo's funeral. In the reunion special, Natalie says about Jo, "I haven't seen her in a lifetime," referencing the Lifetime network where The Division aired. While filming the reunion movie, Lisa Whelchel (Blair) called Nancy McKeon (Jo) and told her how much she missed their partnership, saying, "Blair's only half the fun without Jo."

=== Steven Bradley ===
Steven Bradley
- First appearance: "Rough Housing"
- Last appearance: "Dope"
- Portrayed by: John Lawlor

In-universe information
- Occupation: Headmaster

Steven Bradley is the headmaster of Eastland Academy and has been nicknamed the "Freud of Sigma Chi". When doing his job, he relied on Emily Mahoney for the first four episodes in order to understand how the academy works as he originally worked in the public school system. In addition to his job, he also taught different classes. He is the authority figure of the series in the first season.

Bradley also looks out for his students, such as when he had to rescue Blair and Tootie in "Flash Flood" and wanting to support Molly when her parents get a divorce in "Molly's Holiday". He was also offended when he found that some of the students were smoking marijuana in "Dope" which led to him having those students expelled which Blair and Sue Ann managed to avoid.

The character was dropped after season one and was replaced by Mr. Harris in "Gossip" and later by Charles Parker in season two.

=== Emily Mahoney ===
Emily Mahoney
- First appearance: "Rough Housing"
- Last appearance: "I.Q"
- Portrayed by: Jenny O'Hara

In-universe information
- Occupation: Teacher

Emily Mahoney is a teacher at Eastland Academy who teaches history and science. She is a stickler for rules where Steven Bradley often undermines her.

The character was dropped after the episode "I.Q."

=== Nancy Olsen ===
Nancy Olsen
- First appearance: "Rough Housing"
- Last appearance: "The Little Chill"
- Portrayed by: Felice Schachter

In-universe information
- Occupation: Student
- Spouse: Roger Butler

Nancy Olsen is portrayed by Felice Schachter. She is an All-American teenager who is said to have scored the highest on an I.Q. test than any of the girls at Eastland. Nancy has an unseen boyfriend named Roger Butler who she is often seen talking on the phone with for hours.

The character of Nancy Olsen was gradually written out of the show after season one, with the character making only a few appearances during seasons two and three. However, she reappeared in the 1986 reunion episode "The Little Chill" where she is shown to be engaged to Roger and is three-months pregnant with their first child.

=== Sue Ann Weaver ===
Sue Ann Weaver
- First appearance: "Rough Housing"
- Last appearance: "The Little Chill"
- Portrayed by: Julie Piekarski

In-universe information
- Occupation: Student

Sue Ann Weaver is portrayed by Julie Piekarski. She is an intelligent and boy-crazy girl from Kansas City who always got good grades in school, though her I.Q. test was shown to be lower than the other students'. Mrs. Garrett once told Sue Ann that I.Q. has nothing to do with her abilities. When it comes to chasing boys, Sue is often in competition with Blair, and the two are characterized as both rivals and friends. In one episode, Blair convinces Sue Ann to go on a diet for a swimming party, which leads to Sue Ann refusing to eat for over a week. When Sue Ann collapses at lunch, Blair is worried and guilt-stricken. After Mrs. Garrett talks with Sue Ann, she learns to accept herself as she is - and shoves Blair's face into the dessert that she brings her as a peace offering.

The character of Sue Ann Weaver was gradually written out of the show after season one, with the character making only a few appearances during seasons two and three. However, she reappeared in the 1986 reunion episode "The Little Chill" where she is now a gofer at a company while claiming that she is in a higher-level position. In the episode, Jo finds out the truth, but keeps quiet about it to the other girls, so as not to embarrass her.

=== Cindy Webster ===
Cindy Webster
- First appearance: "Rough Housing"
- Last appearance: "The Little Chill"
- Portrayed by: Julie Anne Haddock

In-universe information
- Occupation: Student

Cindy Webster is played by Julie Anne Haddock. She is around 14 years old at the beginning of The Facts of Life. Cindy is an athletic tomboy, who, at the start of the series, is worried she isn't "normal." The first episode of The Facts of Life, which aired in August 1979, focused on Cindy, who is concerned that she might like girls, after hearing disparaging remarks from snobby Blair. The episode tackled a sensitive issue during an era when lesbianism was rarely talked about on television, although reaction from modern-day critics has been mixed. Stephen Tropiano, writing in 2002, wrote: "While the episode is not really about homosexuality per se, it seems to deliver a contradictory message. On the one hand, wise Mrs. Garrett dispenses Cindy some good advice when she explains the value of being yourself [...] yet there is a sense of relief that Cindy is heading down the road to heterosexuality because she's fallen for a guy she met at the dance."

On the series, Cindy's best friend and roommate is Sue Ann Weaver and the pair appear together occasionally in episodes, including in an episode where the two girls fight over a racing competition ("Running", 1980). Cindy also does gymnastics and tries out for Harvest Queen at Eastland. In later seasons, she attends journalism class with Blair, Jo, and Sue Ann, although the character of Cindy Webster was gradually written out of the show after season one. She makes only a few appearances during seasons two and three. However, she reappeared in the 1986 reunion episode "The Little Chill". It was revealed in that episode that Cindy had become a model and was now known professionally as Cindy Baker.

=== Molly Parker ===
Molly Parker
- First appearance: "Rough Housing"
- Last appearance: "The New Girl: Part 2"
- Portrayed by: Molly Ringwald

In-universe information
- Occupation: Student
- Relatives: Mr. Parker (father)

Molly Parker is portrayed by Molly Ringwald. She is a perky, budding social activist at Eastland who enjoys taking photographs and playing the guitar. In "Molly's Holiday," it is revealed that her parents are divorced and that she was reluctant to go home during spring break.

The character of Molly Parker was gradually written out of the show after season one, with the character making only one appearance in "The New Girl: Part 2" where she apologizes to the girls about getting put on probation. Molly didn't appear in "The Little Chill" because Ringwald was working in movies with the Brat Pack at the time. When the other girls wondered out loud what became of Molly, Natalie said she had no idea. All that was mentioned was that Molly was unable to attend the reunion.

=== Kelly Affinado ===
Kelly Affinado
- First appearance: "Just My Bill"
- Last appearance: "Seems Like Old Times"
- Portrayed by: Pamela Segall

In-universe information
- Occupation: Student

Kelly Affinado is played by Pamela Segall Adlon. She starts out as a shoplifter taking things from "Edna's Edibles" until Jo caught her pocketing bread and marinated baby carrots and is sent on her way, with Jo preventing Blair from calling the police.

In "Small But Dangerous," Kelly extorts Blair for money from the cash register to pay off the gang that is supposedly causing trouble for "Edna's Edibles." There is no gang and Jo catches on to Kelly's plot, using the phone book to track her down to her apartment. She yells at Kelly for extorting money from her friends and gets the money back. She tells her never to return to the shop. Kelly does return and apologizes to Mrs. Garrett and the girls....especially Jo.

By her next appearance, Kelly turns herself around and starts working for a newspaper vendor selling newspapers on street corners. She asks Jo to be her role model.

In an interview with Entertainment Weekly, Adlon shared that the showrunners "wanted to feminize Jo a little bit" and that she was meant to be the new "tough girl" character. Speaking further, she said, "I don’t think that Nancy McKeon—with all due respect—felt like having somebody come in. Do you know what I mean? I don’t think she was really on board with the new character, so I guess that’s what changed the role so much. I mean, they turned me into this awful person who ended up friggin’ robbing Edna’s Edibles!"

The character was dropped after season five.

=== Andy Moffett ===
Andy Moffett
- First appearance: "Me and Eleanor"
- Last appearance: "The Beginning of the End: Part 1"
- Portrayed by: Mackenzie Astin

In-universe information
- Gender: Male
- Relatives: Beverly Ann Stickle (adoptive mother); Edna Garrett (aunt); Dr. Bruce Gaines (uncle); Alex Garrett (cousin); Raymond Garrett (cousin)

Andy Moffett is portrayed by Mackenzie Astin. He is a boy from a foster home who comes to work for Edna Garrett at Edna's Edibles, and later Over Our Heads.

Late in the 8th season, Andy's foster parents split, prompting Beverly Ann Stickle to adopt him. He later befriends Pippa McKenna, a foreign exchange student who comes to live with them.

=== George Burnett ===
George Burnett
- First appearance: "Into the Frying Pan"
- Last appearance: "A Star is Torn"
- Portrayed by: George Clooney

In-universe information
- Gender: Male
- Occupation: Handyman
- Relatives: Fred Burnett (father)

George Burnett is portrayed by George Clooney. When Edna's Edibles is burned down, George Burnett is hired as a handyman for the development of Over Our Heads. He is portrayed as a lousy handy man, but he becomes good friends with the girls. He visits them and the store, and becomes a friend while he runs his family’s hardware store.

In "A Star is Torn," George quits working at the hardware store and becomes a roadie for a singer named Cinnamon, played by real-life singer, Stacey Q .

The character was dropped after season eight.

=== Beverly Ann Stickle ===
Beverly Ann Stickle
- First appearance: "Out of Peekskill"
- Last appearance: "The Beginning of the Beginning: Part 2"
- Portrayed by: Cloris Leachman

In-universe information
- Gender: Female
- Occupation: Businesswoman
- Spouse: Frank Stickle (divorced)
- Children: Andy Moffet (adopted son)
- Relatives: Edna Garrett (sister); Alex Garrett (nephew); Raymond Garrett (nephew)

Beverly Ann Stickle is played by Cloris Leachman. Beverly Ann was first seen in the fall of 1986, after Mrs. Garrett married and moved to Africa to serve in the Peace Corps. In reality, actress Charlotte Rae's contract had expired and she did not want to continue with the series.

At the time when The Facts of Life was still lucrative for NBC, network president Brandon Tartikoff chose to renew but only with a new mother figure at the helm. Mrs. Garrett's divorced sister, Beverly Ann moved in with the girls as Mrs. Garrett wanted someone to keep an eye on them as she had. However, the girls are mostly independent by this time, with Jo and Blair being adults. She became the property owner for Mrs. Garrett's house and the boutique store, Over Our Heads. Beverly Ann's role expanded from confidante to mother when she legally adopted Over Our Heads worker Andy Moffet, who was being shuffled from foster home to foster home. She mentioned that she was named after her grandfather Boris Ann.

=== Pippa McKenna ===
Pippa McKenna
- First appearance: "Up From Down Under"
- Last appearance: "The Beginning of the Beginning"
- Portrayed by: Sherrie Krenn

In-universe information
- Gender: Female
- Relatives: Kevin McKenna (father)

Pippa McKenna is portrayed by Sherrie Krenn. She is a teenage girl from Eastland's Australian sister school Colunga Academy. She enrolled in Eastland Academy as an exchange student while taking the place of her best friend Frannie Newcomb. Pippa's ruse is exposed in an episode where her father Kevin shows up and wants to bring her home, while having mentioned that she ran away from their home, though he eventually relents and allows her to stay.

== Recurring characters ==
The following characters have recurred in this show:

- Geri Tyler (portrayed by Geri Jewell) is Blair's cousin who has cerebral palsy. Jewell's character primarily was created in order to show Blair's more sympathetic side but Cousin Geri eventually inspired many other people with disabilities interested in the entertainment industry.
- Roy (portrayed by Loren Lester) is the delivery boy who was enamored with Jo.
- Terry (portrayed by Cheryl Epps) is the 14-year-old tomboy cousin of Jo from New Jersey.
- Eddie Brennan (portrayed by Clark Brandon) is the first boyfriend of Jo.
- Charlie Polniaczek (portrayed by Alex Rocco) is Jo's ex-con father.
- Rose Polniaczek (portrayed by Claire Malis) is Jo's mother.
- Alexandra Lambarti (portrayed by Heather McAdam) is a royal princess from the last of the Italian royalty where her father is an Italian prince named Prince Federico and her mother is an Ohio stewardess named Julie.
- Boots St. Clair (portrayed by Jami Gertz) is a snobbish student.
- Charles Parker (portrayed by Roger Perry) was the headmaster of Eastland who succeeds Steven Bradley. He made appearances from season three to season five.
- Linda (portrayed by Kimberly Craig)
- Monica Warner (portrayed by Marj Dusay) is Blair's mother.
- David Warner (portrayed by Nicolas Coster) is Blair's father.
- Gus Reynolds (portrayed by David Tiefen)
- Jeff Williams (portrayed by Todd Hollowell) is Tootie's boyfriend.
- Cliff Winfield (portrayed by Woody Brown) is Blair's boyfriend.
- Ruth (portrayed by Ruth Gillette)
- "Snake" Robinson (portrayed by Robert Romanus) is a tough working class boyfriend of Natalie.
- Casey Clark (portrayed by Paul Provenza) is the proprietor of the community center that Jo works at.
- Kevin Metcalf (portrayed by Ryan Cassidy)
- Rick Bonner (portrayed by Scott Bryce) is a musician and the boyfriend of Jo who later marries her.

== Appearing from Diff'rent Strokes ==
Having originated from the first season finale of Diff'rent Strokes, the show saw the Drummond family make some guest appearances on The Facts of Life for its initial stages to give the spinoff a boost in the ratings. Once Facts proved to be successful, it became clear that Mrs. Garrett would have not come back on the original show and the crossovers stopped.

- Philip Drummond (Conrad Bain) appears in the first episode of the first season, where he tries to convince Mrs. Garrett to come back to Manhattan as his family's housekeeper (due to Rae's safety clause that allowed her to return to Strokes if her spinoff had flopped);
- Arnold Jackson (Gary Coleman) appears in the first episode of the first season, to attend the Harvest Fair, and in the first episode of the second season, where he tries to spend some time with Tootie, the girl he has a crush on;
- Willis Jackson (Todd Bridges) appears in the first episode of the first season, to attend the Harvest Fair, and in the fourteenth episode of the second season, after Mrs. Garrett has invited him at the school for the weekend. After that episode, none of the characters from the parent show would have made a crossover appearance anymore;
- Kimberly Drummond (Dana Plato) appears in the first episode of the first season, to attend the Harvest Fair. While Kimberly is said to be a student of the school, she never made any further guest spots on the show, since she attended Eastland offscreen. In the second episode of the fifth season of Diff'rent Strokes, Kimberly transferred to the same public school attended by Willis, finally severing any connection to Facts.

Charlotte Rae returned as Mrs. Garrett for the wedding episode in Strokes's sixth season, in which she has a brief interaction with Pearl Gallagher (Mary Jo Catlett), the third housekeeper, and a reunion with the Drummond kids. This is Mrs. Garrett's first and only guest appearance after she left the original show for the spinoff series in 1979.
