= Geri Jewell =

American actress

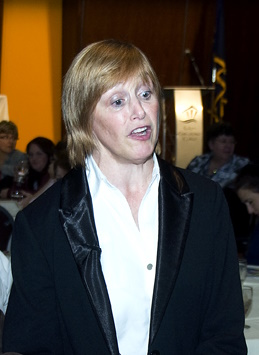
- Jewell in 2009
- Born: Geraldine Ann Jewell; September 13, 1956 (age 70); Buffalo, New York, U.S.
- Occupations: Actress; comedian; diversity consultant; motivational speaker
- Years active: 1978–present
- Spouse: Richard Pimentel (m. 1992; div. 2002)
- Website: www.gerijewell.com

Geraldine Ann "Geri" Jewell (born September 13, 1956) is an American actress, stand-up comedian, diversity consultant, and motivational speaker, noted for roles on the 1980s sitcom The Facts of Life and the mid-2000s western Deadwood.

== Early life ==
From Buffalo, New York, Jewell was born to Olga and Jack Jewell. She has two brothers, David and Fred; her sister Gloria died in 2016. Jewell was born three months early due to a car accident her mother was in while pregnant with Jewell. At eighteen months old, she was diagnosed with cerebral palsy. Growing up, Jewell's parents were determined not to raise her differently from the rest of their children, lest she think she wasn't as capable as her siblings.

After her diagnosis of cerebral palsy, Jewell and her family moved to Orange County, California so that she could have access to better care as well as schools that could accommodate her needs. Jewell attended a private school for children with cerebral palsy and remained there through first grade. After first grade, she attended a special education program at a public school, where she faced discrimination. Jewell described her school life as lonely and sheltered; she said she never had a best friend growing up, and was never able to practice her social skills.

Jewell was inspired by Carol Burnett and wrote Burnett a letter when she was thirteen, asking her for advice since she too wanted to be a comedic actress. Burnett wrote back to her, telling her to “keep putting one foot in front of the other until you get where you want to go." Later on in life, Jewell went with a friend to see Carol Burnett perform.

Although she always knew she was interested in the arts, Jewell first studied accounting and psychology at college before committing to the theater. Jewell went to two different junior colleges: Cypress College and then Fullerton College. It was at Fullerton College where she befriended Alex Valdez, a blind comedian, who encouraged her to do stand-up at The Comedy Store. Jewell wanted to transfer once more and enroll in UCLA-Fullerton to earn a degree in psychology and theater arts, but she ended up dropping out to perform at The Comedy Store, since she struggled with some of her college classes and wanted to pursue acting more seriously. Jewell said that maturing emotionally was one of her hardest accomplishments, since she had been somewhat sheltered as a child.

After she dropped out of college, Jewell began work as a stand-up comic at The Comedy Store in 1978.

== Career ==
=== The Facts of Life ===
In 1980, Jewell was offered a role on The Facts of Life. The show ended up being one of the longest-running TV sitcoms in the 1980s. The Facts of Life was a spin-off from Diff'rent Strokes, which featured Edna Garrett, the housekeeper in the Drummond household. Garrett was written into the new show as a housemother, and later a dietitian, at the fictitious Eastland private school. Jewell first appeared in the show's second season. Her role as Geri Tyler, the cousin of Blair, was groundbreaking. She was the first disabled actor to have a recurring role on a TV series. She was on The Facts of Life for twelve episodes and her contract ended in 1984. Not only was Jewell fired from The Facts of Life, but her then-manager was also arrested for embezzlement and securities fraud. Jewell was left broke and without professional representation. In her first autobiography, Geri, published in 1984, Jewell wrote of the situation,

...I had a manager who was a crook. People in my life were manipulating me and taking advantage of me. Then The Facts of Life did not renew my contract. Years later, they offered me one episode during the fifth season, and my new manager, Richard Lippin, who was trying to fix all the previous manager’s mistakes, turned it down. He felt that after everything that I’d done for Facts, it was a slap in the face that they would only offer me one show. If I had had it my way, I would have accepted it anyway. But I don’t blame him, because he was right. The problem was that he thought I was indispensable, and they didn’t. He figured that they would come back with something better. And—oops!—they never did. He told me not to worry about it, that I was going to find other work because I was very talented, and I was the first person with a disability to break ground in a series.

=== Post-Facts of Life ===
The years immediately following the show were dark for Jewell, and included an addiction to sleeping pills. A biography about her written by Stewart Weiner, also titled Geri, was published without her authorization. She never believed it illustrated her life as well as her autobiography.

Jewell was asked to speak at the White House about her disability in 1985. She began her speech: “Love and fear cannot exist at the same time. One cannot exist in the presence of the other...[people are] not born into the world with prejudice; prejudice is a learned behavior. Fear is what stops us from loving genuinely”. Jewell told the audience at the White House to face their fears and uncertainties first in order to love others. This speech helped lead her to her next chapter as a motivational speaker.

In 1986, Jewell said her new role as an disability rights advocate allowed her to pick up the pieces of her life, and to find purpose. She also found success as a consultant to Fortune 500 companies on creating better accommodations and more inclusive culture for the disabled workforce.

In 2011, Jewell published her autobiography, I’m Walking As Straight As I Can: Transcending Disability in Hollywood and Beyond, which later won a 2013 Golden Halo Award, and the 2013 UCP Life Without Limits Award. She discussed the frustration of constantly being cast solely for her disability. Although representation is important, she said, she would have liked Hollywood to see her as an actor who could play roles not specifically written for someone with cerebral palsy. She also wrote about her 2002 divorce from husband Richard Pimentel and came out publicly as a lesbian. The title, I'm Walking as Straight as I Can referred both to her cerebral palsy and sexual orientation.

=== Deadwood ===
Jewell appeared as the recurring character Jewel on the HBO original series Deadwood from 2004 to 2006 and in its 2019 film continuation.

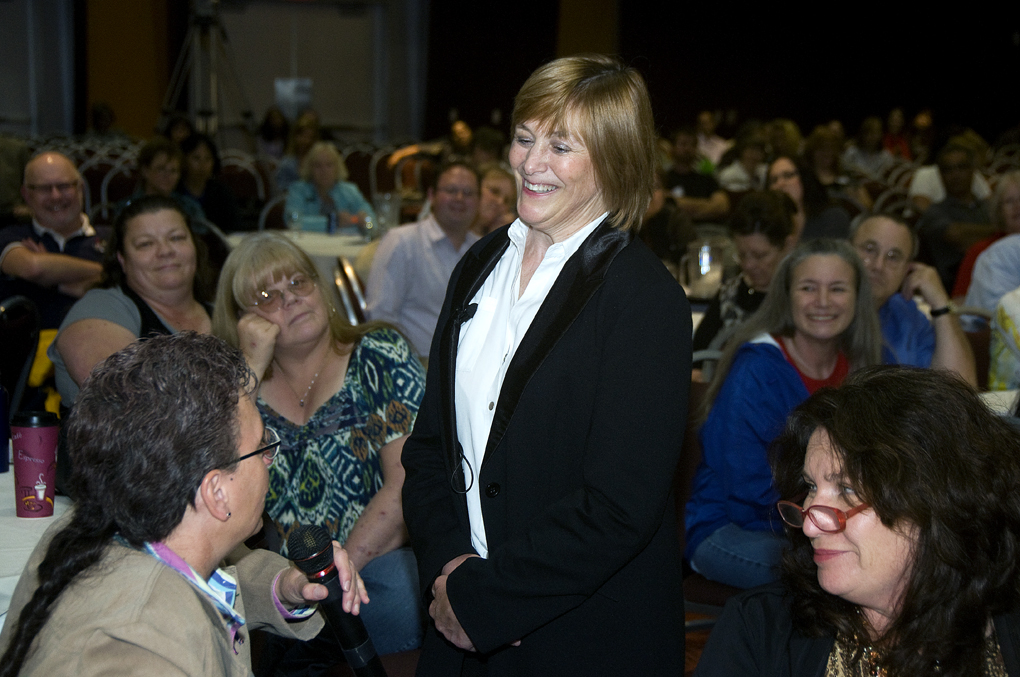
Keynote speaker Geri Jewell takes questions from the audience.

In an interview with Adrienne Faillace for the Academy of Television Arts & Sciences Foundation, Jewell explained how she co-created her character on Deadwood with the creator David Milch. Jewell described her first meeting with Milch and his writers, and how after their meeting, Milch asked her to “forget everything that happened." When Milch told her this, Jewell said, she believed that she was no longer being considered for the role. But in a turn that surprised her, Milch told Jewell he wanted her to tell him about her insights on the character, and to tell him what she believed would accurately represent a person with cerebral palsy in the 19th century. She said she appreciated his respect for her talents as a writer and actor.

== Awards ==
Jewell has been the recipient of many awards, including the 1992 Founders Award, the 2005 Independent Living Legacy Award, and a National Rehabilitation Hospital Victory Award (in 2006). Jewell's most recent autobiography, I'm Walking as Straight as I Can, received the 2012 Gold Award by the Independent Publishers. Further, Jewel also received the 2013 Golden Halo Award and the 2013 UCP Life Without Limits Award.

== Filmography ==
=== Film ===
Year	Title	Role	Notes
1981	Nice Dreams	Mental Patient	Uncredited
1991	Wisecracks	Herself	Documentary
2006	The Night of the White Pants	Aunt Lolly	
2012	Pie Head: A Kinda' True Story Film	Ms. Funker	
2019	Carol of the Bells	Gloria	

=== Television ===
Year	Title	Role	Notes
1980	The Righteous Apples	Terry	Episode: "Love Has Two Left Feet"
1980–1984	The Facts of Life	Geri Tyler	12 episodes
1982	I Love Liberty	Herself	TV special
1982	Two of a Kind	Irene	Television film
1985	Sesame Street	Herself	Episode 2065
1989	The New Lassie	Dr. Rita Francis	Episode: "Slumber Party"
1990	21 Jump Street	Officer Rebecca Scanlon	Episode: "Unfinished Business"
2004	The Young and the Restless	Rose	9 episodes
2004–2006	Deadwood	Jewel	23 episodes
2005	Strong Medicine	Holly	Episode: "Promising Treatment"
2012	Alcatraz	Geri Tiller	Episode: "Cal Sweeney"
2014	Glee	TV Producer	Episode: "The Back-Up Plan"
2019	Deadwood: The Movie	Jewel	Television film

== Personal life ==
Jewell was previously married to Richard Pemental.

Jewell identifies as lesbian.

== Books ==
- Jewell, Geri; Stewart Weiner (1984). Geri. New York: Morrow. ISBN 0-688-02452-1.
- Jewell, Geri (2011). I'm Walking as Straight as I Can. Toronto: ECW Press. ISBN 978-1-55022-883-0.
