= The Facts of Life Goes to Paris =

1982 television film by Asaad Kelada

- Genre: Comedy; Romance
- Written by: Jerry Mayer & Jack Elinson; Linda Marsh & Margie Peters; Deidre Fay & Stuart Wolpert
- Directed by: Asaad Kelada
- Starring: Charlotte Rae; Lisa Whelchel; Kim Fields; Mindy Cohn; Nancy McKeon; Frank Bonner
- Music by: Misha Segal
- Country of origin: United States
- Original language: English

Production
- Executive producers: Jack Elinson; Jerry Mayer
- Producers: Linda Marsh; Margie Peters
- Cinematography: Woody Omens
- Editor: Jack Horger
- Running time: 100 minutes
- Production company: Embassy Television

Original release
- Network: NBC
- Release: September 25, 1982

Related
- The Facts of Life Down Under; The Facts of Life

The Facts of Life Goes to Paris is a 1982 American made-for-television comedy film based on the sitcom The Facts of Life which featured the main characters of that series. It originally aired on NBC on September 25, 1982, four days before the start of season four. The film was later split into four individual half-hour episodes when the series entered syndication. The Facts of Life Goes to Paris occurred during the continuity of the original series.

== Synopsis ==
Mrs. Garrett and the girls—Blair, Jo, Natalie, and Tootie—embark on an overseas vacation to Paris, France during summer recess. Mrs. Garrett attends a prestigious cooking academy and the four girls take part in a program at a French boarding school. While Mrs. Garrett is busy with French cooking lessons, the girls' summer boarding house is oppressive, located kilometers (miles) away outside of Paris, and they are constantly under the watchful eye of their European guardian, a strict woman named Mrs. Southwick (Vivian Brown).

Determined not to let the trip be a total waste, all four girls decide to run away to Paris to enjoy their last few days in France: Blair searches for French romance; while attempting to go to a car race in Le Mans, Jo gets distracted and instead finds it with a young biker named David LeClair (Frédéric Andréi); Natalie and Tootie meet a famous down-on-his-luck American author, Garth "G.K." Kiley (Frank Bonner) and encourage him to try to put down the bottle and pick up the pen again.

== Cast ==
- Charlotte Rae as Edna Garrett
- Lisa Whelchel as Blair Warner
- Kim Fields as Tootie Ramsey
- Mindy Cohn as Natalie Green
- Nancy McKeon as Jo Polniaczek
- Frank Bonner as Garth Kiley
- Frédéric Andréi as David LeClair
- Jacques Ferrière as Pierre Petit
- Vivian Brown as Miss Southwick
- Roger Til as Chef Antoine
- Caroline Ducrocq as Angelique
- Laurie Main as Reggie
- Bernard Soufflet as The Innkeeper

== DVD release ==
The full-length film was released as a bonus feature on The Facts of Life: The Complete Fourth Season DVD set on May 4, 2010 and was re-released on January 13, 2015 as part of The Facts of Life: The Complete Series 26-disc DVD set.
