= Kim Fields =

American actress and television director

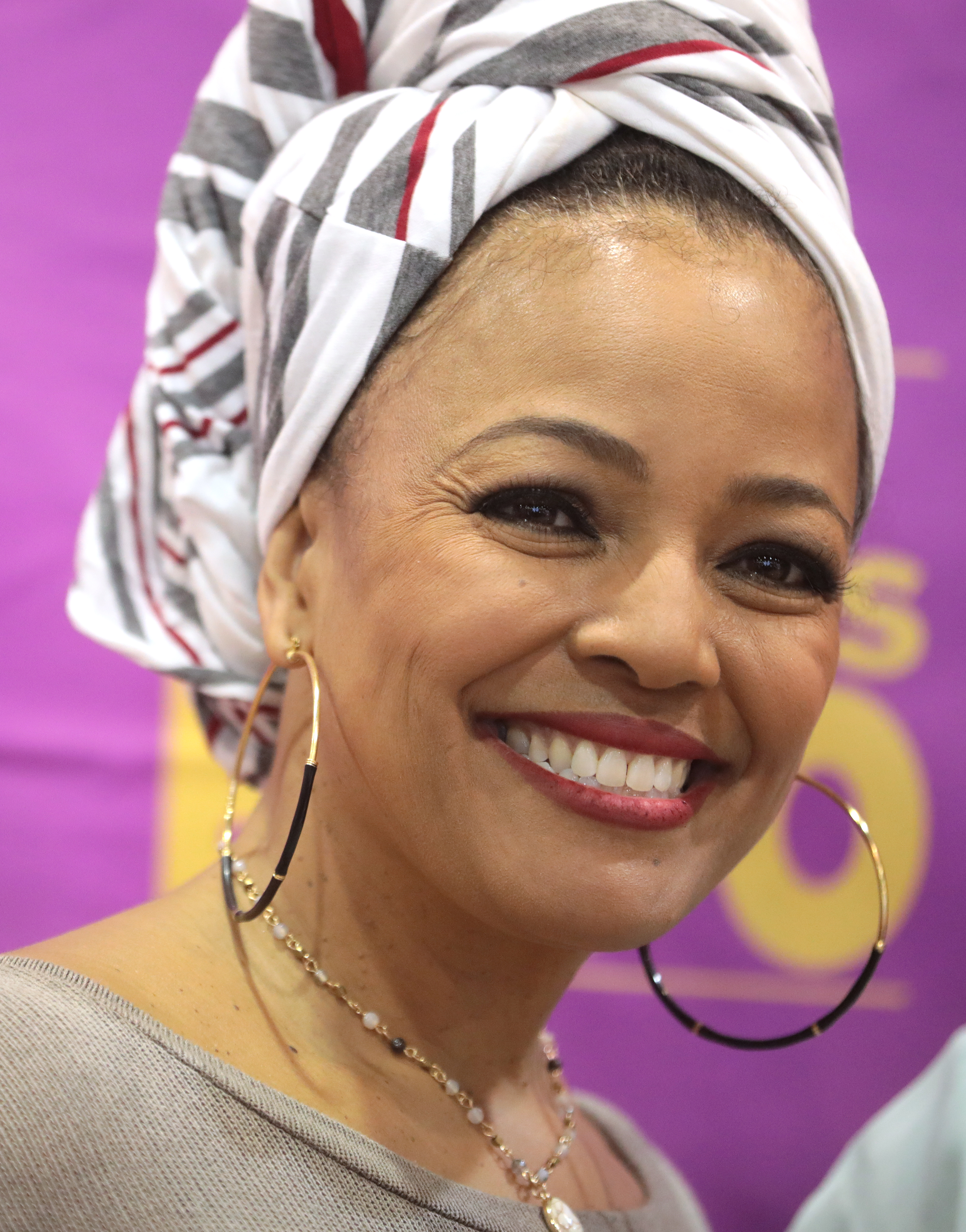
- Fields in 2019
- Born: May 12, 1969 (age 57); New York City, New York, U.S.
- Other names: Kim Fields Freeman; Kim Fields Morgan
- Education: Pepperdine University (BA)
- Occupations: Actress, director
- Years active: 1976–present
- Known for: The Facts of Life; Living Single; Real Housewives of Atlanta; The Upshaws
- Spouses: Johnathon Freeman (m. 1995; div. 2001) Christopher Morgan (m. 2007)
- Children: 2
- Mother: Chip Fields

Kim Fields Morgan (née Fields; born May 12, 1969) is an American actress and director. She first gained fame as a child actress on the television series Good Times (1978–1979), and rose to greater prominence for her role as Dorothy "Tootie" Ramsey on the NBC sitcom Diff'rent Strokes (1979–1981), as well as its spin-off The Facts of Life (1979–1988).

Fields made her transition into mature roles as Regine Hunter on the Fox sitcom Living Single (1993–1998). Afterwards, she began work as a director on the Nickelodeon sitcom Kenan & Kel, as well as Tyler Perry's House of Payne. She most recently starred in the Netflix original series The Upshaws (2021–2026).

== Career ==
Before appearing on The Facts of Life, Fields co-starred in a short-lived sitcom called Baby, I'm Back with Demond Wilson and Denise Nicholas, and she appeared in a television commercial for Mrs. Butterworth's syrup. She later appeared on two episodes of Good Times as a friend of Penny Gordon Woods, played by Janet Jackson (sister of Michael). Fields' episodes on Good Times were "The Snow Storm" and "The Physical".

Fields played the role of Dorothy "Tootie" Ramsey on the NBC sitcom The Facts of Life from 1979 to 1988. Even years later, many still recognize her catchphrase, "We're in troouu-ble! ". When the show began production, Fields was so short that the producers put her on roller skates during the first season so that they could avoid difficult camera angles. However, she later lost a role as Arnold Jackson's girlfriend on The Facts of Life's parent show Diff'rent Strokes because she was taller than Gary Coleman, who played Arnold. In 1984, during the run of The Facts of Life, Fields released two singles on the Critique Records label: the disco/Hi-NRG "He Loves Me He Loves Me Not" (which became a minor club hit), and "Dear Michael" (which became a minor R&B hit, reaching No. 50).

After taking time away from acting to attend Pepperdine University to earn her bachelor's degree in telecommunications, Fields appeared in a 1993 episode of The Fresh Prince of Bel-Air, in which Will Smith pretended to marry her in an attempt to seduce her. Fields had a starring role in the hit Fox sitcom Living Single as Regine Hunter from 1993 to 1998. In this role, Fields would act alongside her real-life mother Chip Fields, who played her character's mother on the show.

Following the end of Living Single, Fields began performing R&B and rap music with a group called Impromp 2. With her degree from Pepperdine University, Fields also began directing. Fields directed a number of episodes of the All That! spin-off Kenan & Kel, in which she also appeared in two episodes. She has worked as a director on the sitcoms Tyler Perry's Meet the Browns, Tyler Perry's House of Payne and BET's Let's Stay Together.

Fields guest-starred on television shows such as UPN's One on One, The Golden Palace, and Martin. She appeared as herself on HBO's The Comeback. On February 1, 2007, Fields was reunited with her co-star Lisa Whelchel on WFAA-TV's Good Morning Texas. Fields was in Dallas to promote her appearance in the production Issues: We've All Got 'Em when Whelchel was introduced as a surprise guest. It marked the first time in six years (since The Facts of Life Reunion movie) that Fields and Whelchel had seen each other.

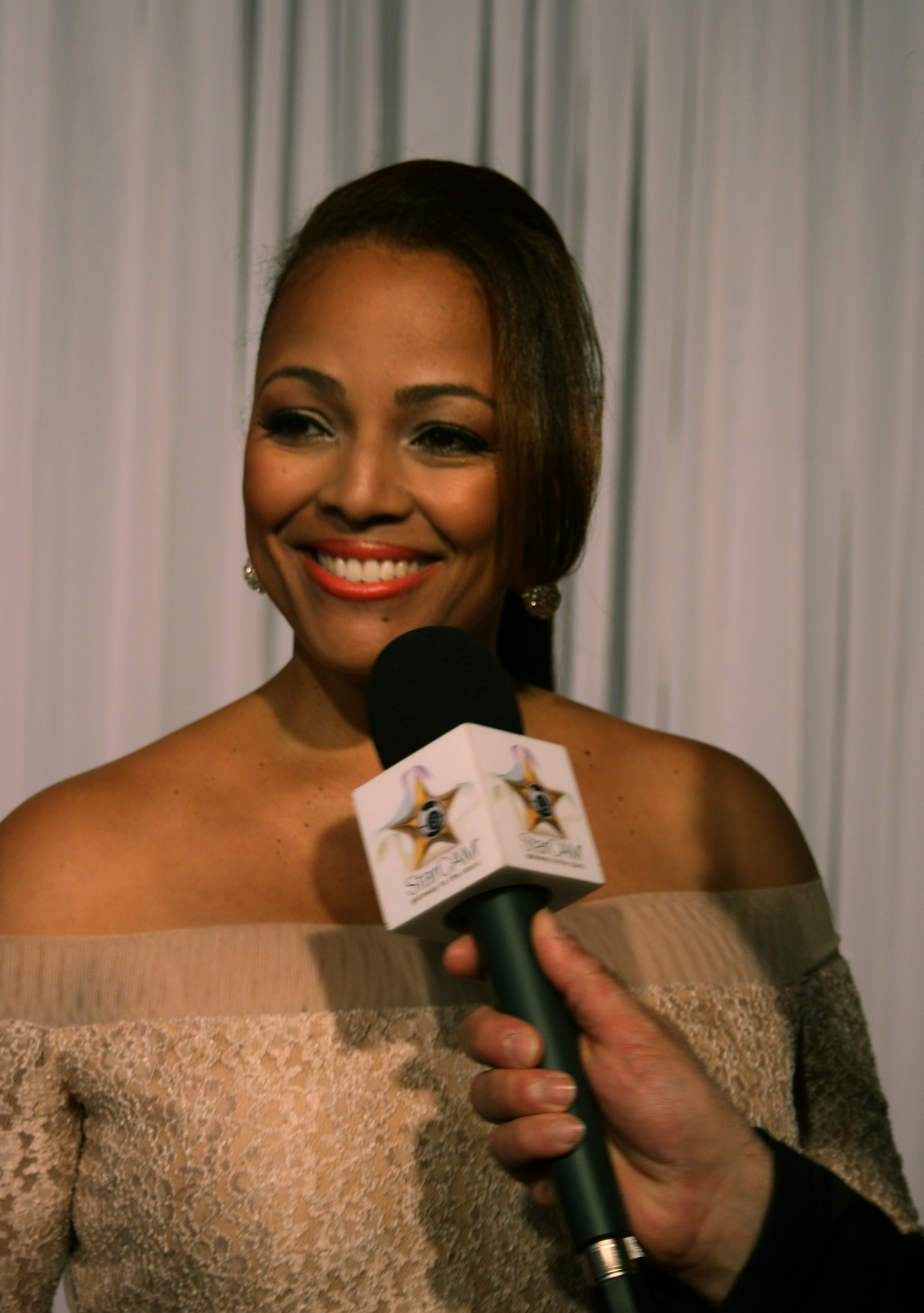
Fields in 2011

Fields has worked with her husband Christopher Morgan on projects. In 2010, she and Morgan produced and directed a Christmas television special called Holiday Love. They shot the entire show in three days. Holiday Love aired on TV One and a second episode aired for Christmas, 2011. In an interview that included background on the show, Fields described the special as "restorative and transformative" of her Christian faith. Fields revived Holiday Love on the Internet in 2013.

On August 18, 2015, it was announced that she would be joining the cast of the Bravo reality television show The Real Housewives of Atlanta for its eighth season. On March 21, 2016, she announced that she would not return to the show for another season.

On March 8, 2016, Fields was announced as one of the celebrities who will compete on season 22 of Dancing with the Stars. She was partnered with professional dancer Sasha Farber. On May 2, 2016, during a double elimination, Fields and Farber were eliminated and finished the competition in 8th place.

In 2017, Fields played the role of Theresa Newman in the Christian film A Question of Faith, which featured Fields' first co-starring appearance in a feature film and premiered in theaters on September 29, 2017.

Since May 2021, Fields has starred on Netflix's The Upshaws.

== Personal life ==
Fields was born in New York City and raised in Harlem, Manhattan.

She was married to film producer Johnathon Franklin Freeman from 1995 to 2001. Fields gave birth to her first child, Sebastian Alexander Morgan, in Mount Sinai Medical Center in East Harlem, Manhattan, by then-boyfriend Broadway actor Christopher Morgan, on May 4, 2007. The couple introduced their son the following week in People magazine. On July 23, 2007, they were married in a private ceremony officiated by Pastor Donnie McClurkin. In July 2013, Fields announced on the talk show The Real that she and her husband were expecting another son; on December 3, 2013, they welcomed Quincy Xavier Morgan in Atlanta, Georgia.

== Filmography ==
=== Film ===
Year	Title	Role	Notes
1977	Have I Got a Christmas for You	Sharon Hayes	TV movie
1980	The Comeback Kid	Molly	TV movie
1980	Children of Divorce	Denise Williams	TV movie
1982	The Kid with the Broken Halo	Teri Desautel	TV movie
1982	The Facts of Life Goes to Paris	Dorothy "Tootie" Ramsey	TV movie
1987	The Facts of Life Down Under	Dorothy "Tootie" Ramsey	TV movie
1999	Uninvited Guest	Mecca	
2000	Hidden Blessings	Carrie McNichols	TV movie
2000	Glow	Miss Downey	
2001	Me & Mrs. Jones	Desiree	
2001	The Facts of Life Reunion	Dorothy "Tootie" Ramsey	TV movie
2010	Monster Mutt	Valerie Williams	TV movie
2012	What to Expect When You're Expecting	Social Worker	
2012	A Cross to Bear	Joan	TV movie
2014	For Better or For Worse	Roseanne	TV movie
2017	A Question of Faith	Theresa Newman	
2017	Wrapped Up In Christmas	Courtney Widmore	TV movie
2018	Merry Wish-Mas	Celine	TV movie
2019	You Light Up My Christmas	Emma Simmons	TV movie
2021	Adventures in Christmasing	Parker Baldwin	
2024	The Gutter	Vicki	

=== Television ===
Year	Title	Role	Notes
1978	Baby... I'm Back!	Angie Ellis	Main Cast
1978–1979	Good Times	Kim	Recurring Cast: Season 6
1979	Roots: The Next Generations	Lydia Haley	Episode: "Part VI (1939-1950)"
1979	Mork & Mindy	Patti	Episode: "Mork's Health Hints"
1979–1981	Diff'rent Strokes	Dorothy 'Tootie' Ramsey	Guest: Seasons 1-3, Recurring Cast: Season 4
1979–1988	The Facts of Life	Dorothy 'Tootie' Ramsey	Main Cast
1980	Soul Train	Herself	Episode: "Cameo/Edmund Sylvers/Kim Fields"
1980	The Righteous Apples	LaShawn	Episode: "A Dream Fulfilled"
1983	Go	Herself	Recurring Guest
1984	American Bandstand	Herself	Episode: "Episode #27.29"
1984	Hot Potato	Herself	Recurring Guest
1984	Family Feud	Herself	Episode: "Super Teens"
1984	Pryor's Place	Rita	Episode: "Cousin Rita"
1984–1985	Body Language	Herself	Recurring Guest
1986	One to Grow On	Herself	Episode: "Try New Things"
1987	Wordplay	Herself	Recurring Guest
1987–1989	The New Hollywood Squares	Herself/Panelist	Recurring Guest
1988	Disneyland	Herself	Episode: "Disneyland's All-Star Comedy Circus"
1988	227	Donna Dalton	Episode: "The Roommate"
1988–1989	Win, Lose or Draw	Herself	Recurring Guest
1992	The Golden Palace	Trisha	Episode: "Can't Stand Losing You"
1992	Martin	Monica Hurd	Episode: "Radio Days"
1993	Roc	Ruth	Episode: "Second Time Around"
1993	The Fresh Prince of Bel-Air	Monique	Episode: "The Best Laid Plans"
1993–1997	Living Single	Regina "Regine" Hunter	Main Cast
1994	An Evening at the Improv	Herself/Host	Episode: "Episode #15.3"
1995	The Crew	Regina "Regine" Hunter	Episode: "The Mating Season"
1995	The Fresh Prince of Bel-Air	Herself	Episode: "For Whom the Wedding Bells Toll"
1996	C Bear and Jamal	Maya (voice)	Main Cast
1997–1999	Kenan & Kel	Miss Horn	Guest Cast: Seasons 2 & 4
1998	Hollywood Squares	Herself/Panelist	Recurring Guest
1998	Cupid	Theresa	Episode: "Hung Jury"
2000	Strong Medicine	Lottie	Episode: "Side Effects"
2001	Who Wants to Be a Millionaire?	Herself	Episode: "Classic TV Edition, Show 1 & 2"
2001	Biography	Herself	Episode: "Kim Fields: A Little Somethin' Somethin'"
2001	Intimate Portrait	Herself	Episode: "Kim Fields"
2001	The Drew Carey Show	Kate's Double	Episode: "What's Wrong with This Episode IV"
2001	The Wonderful World of Disney	Dorothy 'Tootie' Ramsey	Episode: "The Facts of Life Reunion"
2001	The Steve Harvey Show	Cousin Chloe	Episode: "Dissin' Cousins"
2002	Inside TV Land	Herself	Episode: "Inside TV Land: African Americans in Television - Variety"
2002	I Love the '80s	Herself	Episode: "1980" & "1981"
2003	Star Dates	Herself	Episode: "Kim Fields"
2003	Cedric the Entertainer Presents	Herself	Episode: "Episode #1.12"
2003	Intimate Portrait	Herself	Episode: "Gladys Knight"
2003	Miss Match	Elizabeth Greene	Episode: "Matchmaker, Matchmaker"
2004	Def Poetry Jam	Herself	Episode: "Episode #4.5"
2004	The Division	Principal Theresa Ogden	Episode: "Zero Tolerance: Part 1 & 2"
2004	One on One	Ms. Swain	Guest Cast: Seasons 3-4
2005	The Comeback	Herself	Episode: "Pilot"
2006	Eve	Rochelle	Episode: "Banishing Acts"
2008	The Cleaner	Carla Anders	Episode: "Lie with Me"
2009	Whatever Happened To?	Herself	Episode: "Roommates"
2010	Lens on Talent	Herself	Episode: "Race Relations"
2010	Hot 50 of 2010 Countdown	Herself	Episode: "20 to 10... El DeBarge, Lalah Hathaway, Kim Fields, Ginuwine, Kem"
2010	Meet the Browns	Director	Episode: "Meet the Neelys"
2015–2016	The Real Housewives of Atlanta	Herself	Main Cast: Season 8
2016	Dancing with the Stars	Herself/Contestant	Contestant: Season 22
2016	Hollywood Today Live	Herself/Guest Co-Host	Episode: "May 27, 2016"
2016	Greatest Hits	Herself	Episode: "Greatest Hits: 1990–1995"
2016	American Masters	Herself	Episode: "Norman Lear: Just Another Version Of You"
2017	Battle of the Network Stars	Herself/Contestant	Episode: "TV Sitcoms vs. TV Kids"
2017	Dish Nation	Herself/Guest Co-Host	Episode: "Episode #6.21" & "#6.83"
2017	Living the Dream	Rhoda	Main Cast: Season 1
2018	Celebrity Family Feud	Herself	Episode: "Team Vanilla Ice vs Kim Fields and Team Ice-T & Coco vs Vivica A. Fox"
2019	Cobra Kai	Sandra Robinson	Episode: "The Moment of Truth"
2019–2020	The Very Very Best of the 70s	Herself	Recurring Guest
2020	Insecure	Mabel	Episode: "Lowkey Trippin"
2021	Entertainment Tonight	Herself/Guest Co-Host	Episode: "Kevin Hart Exclusive!"
2021	History of the Sitcom	Herself	Recurring Guest
2021	Live in Front of a Studio Audience	Herself	Episode: "The Facts of Life" & "Diff'rent Strokes"
2021–2026	The Upshaws	Regina Upshaw	Main Cast
2022	To Tell the Truth	Herself/Panelist	Episode: "Oliver Hudson, Kim Fields and London Hughes"
2022	Name That Tune	Herself/Contestant	Episode: "The Good, the Shag, and the 90210 Icons"
2022	The Talk	Herself/Guest Co-Host	Episode: "Marcia Gay Harden/Kim Fields/Kym Whitley"
2023	Celebrity Wheel of Fortune	Herself/Celebrity Contestant	Episode: "Kel Mitchell, Kim Fields and Penn Jillette"
2024	Impractical Jokers	Herself	Episode: "Kim Fields"

=== Music videos ===
Year	Artist	Song	Notes
1989	The Boys	"A Little Romance"	
1994	Boyz II Men	"On Bended Knee"	Nathan's Girlfriend
2021	Tito Jackson	"Love One Another"	

=== Directing ===
Year	Title	Notes
1996–1997	Living Single	main character
1996–2000	Kenan & Kel	27 episodes
2000	Noah Knows Best	Episode: "Lost Night"
2000	100 Deeds for Eddie McDowd	Episode: "April Fools"
2001–2002	Taina	5 episodes
2002	Teen Talk	
2005	Discoverin Monk and Trane: One Night at Carnegie Hall	Short
2005	Eve	Episode: "Break Up to Make-Up"
2006	A Royal Birthday	Miniseries
2007	Just Jordan	Episode: "Krumpshakers"
2007	2007 Anguilla Tranquility Fest	Short
2007; 2009–2012; 2022	Tyler Perry's House of Payne	41 episodes
2011	Let's Stay Together	3 episodes
2012	The Rickey Smiley Show	3 episodes
2015	By Any Means	2 episodes
2019	Raven's Home	Episode: "Bah Humbugged"
2020	Tyler Perry's Young Dylan	5 episodes
2021	The Ms. Pat Show	2 episodes
2021	All The Queen's Men	7 episodes
2021–2023	That Girl Lay Lay	6 episodes
2022	Haus of Vicious	8 episodes
2023	The Upshaws	main character
2024	Extended Family	Episode: "The Consequences of Writing Things Down"
2025	Crutch	2 episodes
2026	The Neighborhood	Episode: "Welcome to the Zhuzhu"
