= 30 Years to Life (2001 film) =

2001 film by Vanessa Middleton

- DVD cover
- Directed by: Vanessa Middleton
- Written by: Vanessa Middleton
- Produced by: Andrew LeBlanc; Felice Schachter; Gingi Rochelle; Julie Ann Lucas; Tim Mosley; Vanessa Middleton
- Starring: Allen Payne; Erika Alexander; Melissa De Sousa; Paula Jai Parker; Tracy Morgan
- Cinematography: Cliff Charles
- Edited by: Gershon Hinkson
- Music by: Timbaland
- Distributed by: Exodus Entertainment; Screen Media Films
- Release dates: January 21, 2001 (Sundance); June 7, 2002
- Running time: 103 minutes
- Country: United States
- Language: English
- Box office: $103,540

30 Years to Life is a 2001 American comedy film, written and directed by Vanessa Middleton. The film, which marks Middleton's directorial debut, stars Allen Payne, Paula Jai Parker, and Tracy Morgan. The film premiered at the 2001 Sundance Film Festival. The film released to theatres on June 7, 2002 in the United States.

== Plot ==
A handful of close friends, due to turn 30, discover that their dreams for the future are running headfirst into the realities of adulthood in this character-driven comedy-drama. Natalie is a banker who is happy with her job, but is tired of being single, and her pursuit of a husband is taking her down several blind alleys in the world of dating. Joy has developed a similar desire to settle down and get married, but while she has a long-term boyfriend, Leland, he is not so sure he wants to make a lifetime commitment. Troy is a comic who has been on the verge of a career breakthrough for years, but he is starting to wonder if his big break is ever going to arrive. Malik is a white-collar executive who thinks life is passing him by, and is pondering giving up a stable career to start over as a model. And Stephanie is comfortable with her job in real estate, but she is not so comfortable with herself as she struggles with a weight problem she's had since childhood.

== Cast ==
- Allen Payne as Malik
- Erika Alexander as Joy
- Kadeem Hardison as Bruce
- Melissa De Sousa as Natalie
- Paula Jai Parker as Stephanie
- T.E. Russell as Leland
- Tracy Morgan as Troy
- Donald Koanegay as Damon
- Eddie Brill as Lenny
- Grace Garland as Dr. Love
- Laz Alonso as Richard

== Reception ==
On Rotten Tomatoes, the film has a 67% approval rating from critics based on nine reviews, with an average rating of 5.61/10.

=== Accolades ===
2003 Black Reel Awards

- Best Independent Actor (Theatrical) — Erika Alexander (winner)
- Best Independent Actress (Theatrical) — Melissa De Sousa (nominated)

2001 Sundance Film Festival

- Grand Jury Prize — Dramatic (nominated)
