= Vanessa Middleton =

American television producer and writer

- Born: United States
- Occupations: Director, producer, writer

Vanessa Middleton is an American film and television producer and writer, as well as a film director. Middleton has worked as a writer on shows like Cosby, Girlfriends, and Hangin' with Mr. Cooper. In 2001, Middleton made her feature film directorial debut with the romantic comedy 30 Years to Life, starring Tracy Morgan, Paula Jai Parker, and Allen Payne. In 2013, Middleton created the web series Walk This Way.

== Filmography ==
=== Film ===
- 30 Years to Life (2001) (Director, writer, executive producer)

=== Television ===
Year	Title	Creator	Writer	Director	Executive producer
1992	The Apollo Comedy Hour	No	Yes	No	No
1992–1993	Saturday Night Live	No	Yes	No	No
1994	Sister, Sister	No	Yes	No	No
1995–1996	Hangin' with Mr. Cooper	No	Yes	No	No
1996–1999	Cosby	No	Yes	No	Co-executive
2007–2008	Girlfriends	No	Yes	No	Consulting
2009–2010	Meet the Browns	No	Yes	No	No
2013	Walk This Way	Yes	Yes	Yes	Yes
2019–2021	Games People Play	Yes	Yes	No	Yes

== Awards and nominations ==
Year	Organization	Award	Title	Result
1993	Emmy Awards	Outstanding Individual Achievement in Writing in a Variety or Music Program (shared)	Saturday Night Live	Nominated
2001	Sundance Film Festival	Grand Jury Prize: Dramatic	30 Years to Life	Nominated
