= Felice Schachter =

American actress

- Born: Queens, New York City, U.S.
- Occupation: Actress
- Years active: 1964–2003
- Children: 1

Felice Schachter is a retired American actress, best known for her roles as Nancy Olson on The Facts of Life and Bernadette in the cult teen comedy Zapped!.

== Early life and career ==
Schachter was born in Queens, New York City, the daughter of Suzanne Schachter, a theatrical manager. Her parents were divorced. She has two younger sisters. Schachter's mother, the founder of Suzelle Enterprises, helped her get her start at the age of six months, when she appeared on the cover of American Baby magazine. By 1982, Schachter had done over 100 TV commercials, including Ivory Snow, Pampers, Downy, Baby Alive, and Jordache Jeans.

Schachter started her show business career in 1975, appearing in an off-Broadway production of The Innocents, and later in Time Again. She later danced in productions including The Taming of the Shrew with Stuttgart Ballet, Sleeping Beauty with Bolshoi Ballet, and Nutcracker Suite with the New York City Ballet.

== Television and film ==
She started her television career on the 1976 mini-series The Adams Chronicles. She then played what would be her most notable role, Nancy, on The Facts of Life from 1979 to 1982. She played the role regularly until she quit acting to pursue an education at Brown University in 1981, graduating with a B.A. in Semiotics in 1985, although she would continue to make later guest appearances on the show. Her first and only major film credit was as Bernadette in the 1982 movie Zapped!, starring opposite Scott Baio. Other television roles included Diff'rent Strokes, the soap opera Love of Life, NBC Quiz Kids, Alice, New Monkees, and Love, American Style, among others.

After she quit acting to go to school, Schachter was a radio anchor with the sports department of Brown University's WBRU in Providence, Rhode Island, and later a sports broadcaster for CBS Sports (1983–85) and PRIME (1986–87).

== Production ==
In the 1990s, she began working behind the camera, with production credits on such film and television projects as Magic Island, After The Game, the pilot for JAG, Uncle Sam, Twilight of the Golds, High Tide, Born Free, The Citizen, Waiting For The Monkeys, The Gnomes' Great Adventure, Waste Land, Jackie, Knockaround Guys and 30 Years to Life. She was the production coordinator for the series Law & Order: Special Victims Unit.

== Filmography ==
Film
| Year | Title | Role | Notes |
|---|---|---|---|
| 1978 | Just Posing | Tracy | Short film |
| 1982 | Zapped! | Bernadette | |
| 2001 | 30 Years to Life | Waitress In Restaurant | Cameo; also line producer |

Television
| Year | Title | Role | Notes |
|---|---|---|---|
| 1979 | Diff'rent Strokes | Nancy Olson | Episode: "The Girls School" |
| 1979–81, 1986 | The Facts of Life | Nancy Olson | 19 episodes Main cast (Season 1) Recurring role (Season 2–3) Guest star (Season 8) |
| 1980 | Alice | Victoria | Episode: "Here Comes Alice Cottontail" |
| 1985 | E/R | Kim | Episode: "Brotherly Love" |

As producer
| Year | Title | Credited as | Notes |
|---|---|---|---|
| 1995 | JAG | Assistant production coordinator | 2 episodes |
| 1996 | The Twilight of the Golds | Production coordinator | |
| 1996 | Uncle Sam | Production coordinator | |
| 1996 | Born Free: A New Adventure | Unit production manager | TV movie |
| 1997 | High Tide | Production coordinator | 1 episode |
| 2001 | Law & Order: Special Victims Unit | Production coordinator | Also production consultant; 18 episodes |
| 2001 | 30 Years to Life | Line producer | Also actress |
| 2003 | Anne B. Real | Co-producer | |

As Director
| Year | Title | Credited as | Notes |
|---|---|---|---|
| 1995 | Magic Island | Second second assistant director | |

== Awards and nominations ==
| Year | Award | Category | Nominated work | Result |
|---|---|---|---|---|
| 2008 | TV Land Awards | Favorite Character(s) Who "Went Missing"; Shared with: Molly Ringwald, Julie Anne Haddock and Julie Piekarski | The Facts of Life | Nominated |
