= Zapped! =

1982 film by Robert J. Rosenthal

- Theatrical release poster
- Directed by: Robert J. Rosenthal
- Written by: Robert J. Rosenthal; Bruce Rubin
- Produced by: Jeff Apple
- Starring: Scott Baio; Willie Aames; Felice Schachter; Heather Thomas; Robert Mandan; Greg Bradford; Scatman Crothers
- Cinematography: Daniel Pearl
- Edited by: Robert A. Ferretti
- Music by: Miles Goodman; Charles Fox; John M. Keane; Tom Keane
- Distributed by: Embassy Pictures
- Release date: July 23, 1982
- Running time: 98 minutes
- Country: United States
- Language: English
- Box office: $16.9 million or $6.35 million

Zapped! is a 1982 American teen sex comedy film directed by Robert J. Rosenthal and co-written with Bruce Rubin. The film stars Scott Baio as high school student Barney Springboro who acquires telekinetic powers.

== Plot ==
At Ralph Waldo Emerson High School, bookish student Barney Springboro performs various scientific experiments on laboratory mice until his friend, yearbook photographer Peyton Nichols, retrieves him for a class assembly. Peyton questions Barney's lack of interest in finding a girlfriend as the students rally in preparation for an upcoming baseball game against a rival high school. Afterward, Peyton seduces one of the school administrators, Corrine Updike, and Barney returns to his experiments.

At the insistence of the pesky class president, Bernadette, Peyton promises to take photographs of Barney posing with the genetically modified orchids he has been growing for the school principal, Walter Coolidge. Barney drops the beaker containing the mice's feeding solution, producing a cloud of shimmery smoke that knocks him unconscious. Sometime later, he awakens and returns home, where his uptight mother chastises him for his tardiness and antisocial behavior. As she yells, Barney's bedroom door mysteriously slams shut. During English class the next day, Barney fantasizes about a popular but vain girl named Jane Mitchell. When the teacher Rose Burnhart calls on him unexpectedly, Barney furrows his brow, causing the map above the chalkboard to fall on her head.

That afternoon, Peyton asks Jane on a date, but she reminds him that she has a college-aged boyfriend. As Barney stares at Jane's chest, her cardigan bursts open, leaving everyone confused. In the lab, Barney experiments with his new telekinetic abilities by levitating various objects across the room, unaware of Bernadette and Peyton, who are watching through the window. When his friends confront him, however, Barney convinces them to keep his powers a secret. At home, Barney propels his model spaceship through the air, imagining the crew members inside have come alive. He then animates a ventriloquist dummy, which frightens Mrs. Springboro so much that she believes her son is possessed.

On the day of the big baseball game, Barney manipulates the ball and hits the winning home run. Meanwhile, Principal Coolidge attempts to break into Barney's lab to check the growth of his orchids, but cannot obtain the key. Barney agrees to let Bernadette write a report about him for her older sister's college science journal.

Over the weekend, Barney, Peyton, and Bernadette go to a pre-graduation celebration at an amusement park, during which Peyton challenges Jane's boyfriend, Robert Wolcott, to a beer-drinking contest and a carnival game that Peyton ends up winning. While on the Tilt-a-Whirl, Barney increases the speed of Robert's compartment, causing him to vomit and lose the bet. That night, Peyton brings Jane home and seduces her by pretending to act older and more mature. Meanwhile, Barney and Bernadette have dinner and talk about former crushes. The pair spend the next afternoon together in the park before returning to Barney's lab, where they make love.

At school on Monday, Jane admits that she regrets having sex with Peyton and returns to her boyfriend. Robert, however, invites Peyton to a casino-themed college fraternity party with the hopes of winning the money that he owes him for the drinking contest. Peyton begs Barney to attend so he can manipulate the roulette wheel, but Bernadette becomes angry that he would use his powers to gamble. Meanwhile, Mrs. Updike convinces Principal Coolidge to respond to a personal advertisement in the newspaper to meet a woman for a date.

At the restaurant, Principal Coolidge discovers that his date is Mrs. Burnhart, and the two finally succumb to their long-time attraction by having sex under the table. During the fraternity party, Barney attempts to manipulate the roulette ball, but struggles. He realizes Robert is manipulating the wheel himself by using a button to make it stop, and Barney's attempt to balance out the cheating causes a commotion among the guests when he accidentally levitates the entire wheel. When Bernadette refuses to answer his telephone calls, he spends the night in his laboratory drinking whiskey. Hung over the next morning, he apologizes to Bernadette and arranges to meet her at the prom that evening. Before he leaves for the dance, however, Mrs. Springboro hires two priests to perform an exorcism on her son, and Barney uses his ventriloquist dummy to chase them around the house so he can get away.

Peyton and Jane are crowned prom king and queen, and Jane rejects Peyton's continued advances. Peyton realizes that Jane is nothing but a snob, because nothing he does is good enough for her. As Barney dances with Bernadette, Peyton ruins the moment by offering his friend airplane tickets to Las Vegas where they can continue gambling, but Barney rejects the offer. When Robert confronts Peyton about the roulette game, Peyton apologizes and gives him a packet of nude photographs he took of Jane. Enraged, Robert attacks, and Barney uses telekinesis to summon a large gust of wind that tears off the students' clothes and sends everybody running outside. Barney also uses his telekinesis to take down Robert and his friends and humiliate Jane by stripping off her prom dress; as she is laughed at, she runs away in shame. A wayward fire hose knocks Barney unconscious and after he wakes, he pretends he has lost his powers. However, while leaving the school, Barney grabs Bernadette by the waist and propels them through the night sky in a cloud of shimmery dust.

== Cast ==
- Scott Baio as Barney Springboro
  - Carlos Lacámara as Older Barney Springboro
- Willie Aames as Peyton Nichols
- Robert Mandan as Principal Walter J. Coolidge
- Felice Schachter as Bernadette
- Scatman Crothers as Coach Dexter Jones
- Roger Bowen as Mr. Springboro
- Marya Small as Mrs. Springboro
- Greg Bradford as Robert Wolcott
- Hilary Beane as Corinne Updike
- Sue Ane Langdon as Rose Burnhart
- Heather Thomas as Jane Mitchell
- Merritt Butrick as Gary Cooter
- Irwin Keyes as Too Mean Levine
- Ed Deezen as Sheldon
- Bryan O'Byrne as Father Murray
- Ed Bakey as Father Gallagher
- Jan Leighton as Albert Einstein
- LaWanda Page as Mrs. Jones
- Rosanne Katon as Donna
- Susan Ursitti as Debby
- Corinne Bohrer as Cindy

== Production ==
The film used several techniques to capture the feel of its high school setting for nostalgic fans. It was filmed largely at John Marshall High School in Los Angeles during the spring of 1981 with the students as extras. The storyline rarely leaves the high school. The students talk mostly about social life and college plans, while the prom is in the gym. The senior trip is to the local amusement park. Of the major stars, however, only Felice Schachter was still a high school student when the film was shot. In fact, she missed her own prom to shoot the prom sequence in the film.

The film used a body-double for Heather Thomas' nude scenes, as she refused to remove her own clothes; further controversy was generated when a complaint was filed by Thomas about a likeness of her head being pasted onto someone else's nude body.

Scott Baio and Willie Aames worked together again the following year on the sitcom Charles in Charge.

=== Music ===
The film's soundtrack was composed by Charles Fox and Miles Goodman as well as John M. Keane and Tom Keane of The Keane Brothers, and featured performances by Joe "Bean" Esposito ("Updike's Theme") and David Pomeranz ("Got to Believe in Magic", "King and Queen of Hearts"), which were big hits in the Philippines.

== Release ==
=== Box office ===
Zapped! was given a limited release on July 23, 1982, earning $823,548 in that weekend, ranking number 17 in the domestic box office. On September 3, 1982, the film was released wide and made $3,012,431, ranking number 4 behind An Officer and a Gentleman's sixth weekend, E.T. the Extra-Terrestrial's thirteenth weekend, and Fast Times at Ridgemont High's fourth weekend. By the end of its run, Zapped! grossed $16,897,768.

=== Critical response ===
Targeted towards teenage audiences, Zapped! received generally negative reviews at the time of its release. On Rotten Tomatoes, it has an approval rating of 6%, based on 16 reviews, with an average rating of 2.9/10. On Metacritic, the film received a score of 10 based on 4 reviews, indicating "overwhelming dislike".

The film was denounced by The New York Times' Vincent Canby, and called it "a half-baked, rather retarded parody of Carrie and a number of other films that, using the awesome power of their ignorance, drove telekinesis into the ground." The Leader-Post of Regina, Saskatchewan displayed similar contempt: "Picture a bad Walt Disney film—but with more exposed flesh than you'll see in all the Disney films put together—with bits and pieces scalped from box-office hits, and you've got a pretty good idea of what this movie is all about."

The Pittsburgh Post-Gazette suggested that "it's hard to believe the writers of Zapped!, an absolutely abominable movie ... are even old enough to hold a pen." The Daily Courier added that it was "so puerile and uninspired that it makes Porky's seem like Ninotchka in comparison." The Montreal Gazette said that there was "nothing innately hilarious about telekinesis, but that didn't stop the creative geniuses in Hollywood from seeing if they could pervert it into a smirky adolescent experience." A review from the smaller Beaver County Times said, "it's enough to make [Baio's] young fans go Zzzzzz." A review that was published in the Toledo Blade was only slightly less negative, stating that it "has its moments, but they tend not to hang around together."

In 2014, Baio remembered the film fondly: "Great movie. Loved it then. Love it today. I get more people asking about that movie than anything, no lie. And I had a ball making that. A cute, fun teen movie, and it made money. And it had Scatman Crothers! He was a good guy, and supposedly he smoked pot every day. That's what I was told, but I don't actually know. But I got to work with Willie [Aames], and it was a great experience ... Good people. Good crew. Good director."

=== Accolades ===
Aames was nominated by for the Golden Raspberry Award for Worst Actor at the 3rd Golden Raspberry Awards for his performance in Zapped!, as well as his performance in Paradise, but lost to Laurence Olivier in Inchon.

=== Home media ===
Zapped! was initially released on VHS, CED videodisc, and on LaserDisc by Embassy Pictures in 1983, and later reissued by MGM Home Entertainment on VHS. It was released on DVD on February 12, 2008. In June 2008, 20th Century Fox Home Entertainment issued it as a double feature with Making the Grade.

== Sequel ==
Zapped! sold heavily on home video. In 1990, it was followed by a direct-to-video sequel, Zapped Again! (with only Sue Ane Langdon returning from the original cast).
