= The Equalizer (1985 TV series) season 1 =

The Equalizer
- Season 1
- Season 1 American DVD cover
- Starring: Edward Woodward; Keith Szarabajka
- No. of episodes: 22

Release
- Original network: CBS
- Original release: September 18, 1985 – April 8, 1986

Season chronology
- Next → Season 2

The Equalizer is an American action crime drama television series, co-created by Michael Sloan and Richard Lindheim.

Originally airing on CBS, a national broadcast television network in the United States, season one premiered on September 18, 1985 and ran for 22 episodes until the season finale on April 8, 1986. The series ran four seasons with a total of 88 episodes.

== Synopsis ==
"The Equalizer" is the nickname given by a colleague and friend named Brahms (played by Jerry Stiller) to the protagonist Robert McCall, who is a former U.S. intelligence operative turned freelance "security officer." The latter description was given to him by NYPD Detective Lt. Jefferson Burnett, who at first is dubious about working with a vigilante.

McCall's clients usually call after seeing his newspaper advertisement in the security section of the classifieds. "Got a Problem? Odds Against You? Call The Equalizer 212-555-4200"

Episodes depict McCall reviewing his answering machine to decide who to help and who to ignore, followed by a meeting to discuss specifics of the case and how to proceed. McCall often enlists the help of current and former "Company" agents and assets to assist him, while also liaising with contacts in the New York Police Department. Occasionally, events and individuals from his prior career in espionage return to complicate his new profession.

== Episodes ==
No. overall	No. in season	Title	Directed by	Written by	Original release date	Prod. code	Rating/share (households)
1	1	"The Equalizer" "Pilot"	Rod Holcomb	Michael Sloan	September 18, 1985	83517	18.3/32
At knife-point, a girl in the subway is used as a shield by agent Cristolides. Robert McCall talks him down, but Cristolides is shot by agent Mason. McCall considers shooting Mason. The music teacher jokes with Scott McCall, as his estranged father arrives. Disenchanted, wanting "a new slate," Robert resigned from an unnamed American intelligence "Company." Scott agrees to give his father a chance. On a quest for atonement, McCall checks the ad he bought: GOT A PROBLEM? ODDS AGAINST YOU? CALL THE EQUALIZER; 212-555-4200 Art teacher Carlene Randall rebukes her daughter Sarah for talking to a stranger. The stranger watches. Hamilton at Manhattan Telecommunications discovers "a locked sequence, 0900" in a restricted account list with an embedded phone number; Pentagon General Branford answers. Olsen and Gardner take him to Senior VP Leonard Morgan. The stranger calls Carlene. "What are you wearing? My name is Steve...it is time that we really meet." She hangs up, but he's outside; waving. Control dissuades McCall from resigning; he's a security risk. Hamilton is nearly killed. His wife Ellen listens as he calls The Equalizer. Carlene is shopping; so is Steve. Someone shoots at Hamilton. McCall drives away, but "This isn't quite working." He takes action; "NOW it's working." NYPD Detective Lieutenant Jefferson Burnett from the 83rd Precinct wonders about McCall's new "security officer" job, and why he should help him. McCall gives him the plate number. It's registered to Morgan. Burnett warns, "This isn't 'Nam or Africa or Central America. This is the Big A, and you don't know what guerilla warfare is until you hit those streets." Carlene is also at the precinct with Detective Lt. Goldman, whose hands are tied. McCall gets to Hamilton's terminal. Morgan noticing, orders Olsen and Gardner to get him. Steve sees Carlene; in her home – in the shower. "I'll be back." That's it! She calls The Equalizer. Brahms says he doesn't know anyone who left the Company, and tells McCall, he's "Code Red," "Top Security Violation." McCall asks Brahms to crack the "0900" code. Steve's back! McCall confronts him; with his Jaguar XJ and a gun. "Leave the Lady alone!" About advertisements, Brahms comments, "I thought I was the only one who called you 'The Equalizer'." About codes, a presidential candidate was bugged; Senator Jim Blanding. McCall suspects extortion. Control lowers McCall's code to Yellow, "officially dangerous, but tolerable." McCall goes to confront Morgan. Meanwhile, Steve grabs Carlene at knife-point.
2	2	"China Rain"	Richard Compton	Story by : Victor Hsu; Teleplay by : Joel Surnow & Maurice Hurley & Victor Hsu	September 25, 1985	61204	14.3/23
The maid Mrs. Tom brings her son Vincent to work, upsetting Mr. Lin. Mrs. Lin prompts Sarah, who takes them out to the park. Chinatown gangsters kidnap Vincent, mistaking him for Henry. Lt. Burnett prepares for ransom calls. Hans and Maxine show for the party but quickly retreat. Control wants McCall's operational notes. The Shemoneh Esrei "benediction for new life" persuades McCall to trade. Mr. Lin won't pay two-million. A police detective carelessly blurts defeatist remarks. Sarah sees the ad; Mrs. Tom calls. McCall searches Chinatown, passing a man sitting on the steps, and a Chinese teen, to a nightclub. The bartender Dal, calls for the "Head of Personal Relations," Cynthia. Tommy Li and McCall talk "Old Times." She says, "Joe Boys," but dreads turf wars. McCall replies, "I'm the war you have to avoid." She gives a clue; "Axe." A technician hacks Mr. Lin's system. McCall leverages Lin's interests in Laos and Amsterdam, for a $100,000 token, to "follow the money." Joe Boys celebrate the down-payment. McCall scopes Chung's premises, and trades his marker with Control; he needs supplies, and a "wacko who's willing to stick his finger in the fan," Mickey Kostmayer. Mrs. Tom prays, Burnett gets an address, McCall and Mickey go in.
3	3	"The Defector"	Rod Holcomb	Heywood Gould	October 2, 1985	61213	12.1/20
Trade Attaché clerk Felix Dzershinsky is barred access to the Russian Consul. North American KGB Station Chief Karl Radek suspects Felix is a highly trained American double-agent; "Let's see what he'll do now." Felix calls his handler, McCall. The ballet master directs Irina Dzershinsky, as Felix describes his predicament. Control provides "bare minimum backup" for a "minor league operative." Enter Jacob Stock who bungles a breakdancing distraction. Felix dies, defecting. Lt. Burnett doesn't like "cloak and dagger games." McCall confronts Control about Stock, and intuits it's Radek "The Avenger." Irena gets a "Nightingale" number, and "Equalizer" ad, but blames McCall. He helps another caller; at K.H.C. Pizzeria, Larry Kelly needs a crash-course in self-defense against bullies led by Indio. Larry, "Who are you?" McCall, "You were, possibly, expecting Clint Eastwood?" Russian operatives trap Irena. She calls McCall. Radek reacts, "Better call our two Americans." Larry stands up, and is beat-down. His father Vince vows to "straighten them out," but "It's his fight." Officer O'Hare puts Irena into "protective" custody. McCall gets the bad news, and gears up. Jacob wants to help. "I have to help!"
4	4	"The Lock Box"	Russ Mayberry	Story by : Frank Military; Teleplay by : Frank Military & Joel Surnow & Maurice Hurley	October 9, 1985	61216	15.0/25
"Wow! We're in New York!" exclaims seventeen year-old Edie. Her mother Eleanor lets a gypsy cabbie load up. A union cabbie ousts him, stealing his luggage. The hotel clerk gouges Sam Griffith for squalid lodgings. Curious about New York, Edie leaves, at night, alone; she's accosted by Ramon Scavosa to be dubiously "saved" (abducted) by Francis DeGraumont. An Officer reports to the Desk Sergeant. The Griffiths wait for the Lieutenant. Eleanor is handed an advert. McCall entertains voyeuristic suggestions from Angelica. The Lieutenant thinks Edie ran away, telling Eleanor to wait in Duluth. Furious, she calls. McCall tells Dana Caldrin, "I need a tour of the cesspool, so naturally I thought of you." They go clubbing. Dana points out a hooker named Brandy who explains, "She's getting a crash course – A lock box – whatever he wants...invitation-only." She names Scavosa. Dana elaborates, "2-bit ball racker for DeGraumont." McCall knows that name. A waiter brings Sam's burger; rare. He doesn't complain, angering Eleanor. Fed up, Sam goes hunting. McCall poses as a john to save Edie. Sam gets the news, "diplomatic immunity." Eleanor calls McCall again, to stop Sam from killing DeGraumont.
5	5	"Lady Cop"	Russ Mayberry	Story by : Kathryn Bigelow & Maurice Hurley & Joel Surnow; Teleplay by : Maurice Hurley & Joel Surnow	October 16, 1985	61208	14.4/23
Mulligan Man airs on WJZA's Face to Face. DJ Harmon Hunter yells, "They go'n kill me, man!" (Loan-sharks) McCall, "Call the police! Leave town?" The superintendent leads Officer Nick Braxton and Officer Sandra Stahl to the body. Stahl tries calling in. Officer Miguel Canterra, "Where ya going?" Officer Frank Sergi, "You're new Stahl...be cool...learn something." They search. Canterra, "I once found $6,800 under a mattress!" Braxton finds jewelry. Stahl, "That's not evidence! This is not a game I play." Braxton, "You're already on the team." Her father, Sergeant Marvin Stahl concludes, "This isn't a holy crusade. It's just a job." She disagrees. A drug dealer gives Braxton an envelope. She protests. Fact of Life #4: "Give us any trouble and you're dead." At home, her gun-cleaning blotter shows an advertisement. McCall, how deep is it? Stahl, can you Equalize the NYPD? He tails Braxton with a camera; to the Pawnbroker, his bedroom, a nightclub. A technician hacking NYPD finds leverage. For silence, with Stahl's gun, Braxton kills a bum. McCall, "Dosage?" Jimmy, If you mix them, "buckle up...Snakes eating Snakes." Stahl, McCall, and Burnett, set a trap.
6	6	"The Confirmation Day"	Richard Colla	Story by : Eric Blakeney & Gene Miller; Teleplay by : Edward Adler & Heywood Gould	October 23, 1985	61205	12.9/21
The choirmaster scolds fourteen year-old Anthony Ganucci for passing notes. Outside, Frankie Corso tells his best friend Louie Ganucci, It's a 15-minute trip for $1,500. Louie doesn't want crooked work. Louie tells Anthony, "Confirmation needs a new suit," but he's broke. So Louie steals the truck, loaded with antiques, from Noble. Frankie is shot by Purcell. McCall meets Father Antonelli. An eccentric musical-comedy star, Henrietta Fields says she's being stalked. Louie is now in deep trouble. Anthony hires McCall, who takes him and his mother Marie to a safe house. Lt. Burnett tells McCall, Mrs. Fields is a nut; peeping Toms, Russian spies, 2nd husband's ghost. It's a New York tragedy, but not police business. McCall wants an officer nearby anyway. Who controls the area? Burnett, "We do!" McCall, And when you're not looking? Burnett, "You mean the wise guy. Eddie Vanessi." McCall wonders why Vanessi wants antiques. He goes to find out. Louie, trying to handle it himself, walks into the lion's den. McCall arranges to swap swag.
7	7	"The Children's Song"	Richard Compton	Story by : Howard Chesley; Teleplay by : Howard Chesley & Maurice Hurley & Joel Surnow	October 30, 1985	61203	14.0/24
Robert McCall's estranged son Scott declares he's leaving NYC for the Strasbourg Conservatory in Paris. McCall suggests a weekend at his country cabin to try and bond. A hitch-hiking couple, Jayck and Melinda, are taken off-road by young ruffians Dillart, Ray, and Bobby. It's clear what Dillart wants from Melinda. They try running, but Ray hits Jayck, knocking him unconscious and bloody. The hospital doctor pronounces Jayck dead. Dillart warns Melinda to keep quiet, and tries to get her out, but the doctor tells her that Sheriff Stone will want to talk. They need beer; lots of beer. At the store, they argue while the waitress gets Melinda food. Dillart, "I guess we got no choice." Scott enters, "What's the matter?" Melinda, "They killed Jayck, and I think they're gonna kill me, too." Scott gets her away to the cabin. They follow and cut the lines. Faced with prison, Ray goes for more firepower. Meanwhile, under siege, without their own guns, McCall improvises defenses using only what's in the cabin.
8	8	"The Distant Fire"	Alan Metzger	Story by : Robert Sabaroff; Teleplay by : Robert Sabaroff & Maurice Hurley & Joel Surnow	November 6, 1985	61201	11.8/18
The hitter takes out his gear, and the kid, "No problem." Barry, "Something came." McCall de-codes a USS Intrepid postcard: "S.A.V.E. C.A.R.L.A." Barry, "Opposition?" McCall, "Michael Rosa." Barry whistles, "Who's Carla?" McCall, "A woman," he loved. Company bureaucrat Jason Masur surveils. Rosa explains, Carla married Ambassador Vezay Holden. McCall approves, "Morality, Integrity..." Rosa, Nobel Prize candidate – there's a contract, her too. "Dreams for constitutional independence...her influence." McCall, "So the Inspired must be killed along with the Inspirer...the trigger?" Rosa, "Me...We can save her." Rosa loved her too. Masur, "Hit'em." Barry, "We're taking Rosa! Stay out of this, McCall." They escape. Masur, kill McCall too. Agent, "They won't let us." Masur, "There is no 'They,' I am the 'They.' To hell with Control." McCall fails to convince Carla to flee; "He hides, they win." Interrupted by the hostess, Sarah Claxton introduces herself, "And you are?" McCall, "Leaving." Jimmy needing more money for his divorce lawyer, nonetheless gives McCall the Secret Service plans. McCall and Rosa make their own plan. A bearded man greets McCall at Carla's yacht. Rosa surveils from outside.
9	9	"Mama's Boy"	James Sheldon	Heywood Gould	November 13, 1985	61219	13.5/21
Ronald Baines delays his friend Jeffrey Sims from seeing "charming" but "ruthless psychopath" drug dealer Eugene Benton while discussing "sheep." Victoria Baines brags about Ron to clients, as Jim Cronin announces her promotion. Victoria confronts Ron, finds drugs, cash, and hires McCall. Lt. Burnett says, "no drug reports" at Ron's private school, "but It's everywhere...like a plague." Burnett has Benton's Staten Island mug shot; no conviction. McCall deals; Benton's supplier for letting Ron "off the hook." Victoria visits Selden Gallery, greeted by Vanessa, to enlist her ex-husband Gilbert. He's not interested; "The boy is on his own." Sonny and Ralph confront Eugene, "You shorted us." Ralph pulls a switchblade. Eugene kicks him. "Protect your interests, mama's boy." Ron hits Sonny. McCall, seeing Ronnie dealing, confronts him. Jeffrey OD's. McCall passes single women at Gilbert's gallery, and Vanessa urges Gilbert to help his son. Gilbert recognizes Maureen Sims at Jeffery's funeral. McCall, "Speedballs...cocaine and heroin." Gilbert, "What can I do?" McCall, "I'm setting a trap." McCall hires Taekwondo master McGowan to test Benton's martial arts, then poses as a client.
10	10	"Bump and Run"	Richard Compton	Story by : Jim Trombetta; Teleplay by : Maurice Hurley & Joel Surnow	November 20, 1985	61214	11.8/19
Two thugs walk. "Al'right!" says the first. "He was 73 years old, the man you killed," protests Defense Attorney W. Donald Polk. "You're missing the point...Nobody calls us!" says the second thug. They purse-snatch an old lady. They're followed; they're shot! .44 Magnum. Sgt. Oliver Gant finds the advert, and visits McCall. The copy-cat vigilante leaves a message. McCall gets tracing tech from Ronnie. Foreign student Sydney Blake kills D.J. in a "bump and run" car-jacking. The detective and her lawyer say they'll learn where she lives. Abmennet and Tessor vow to make her pay for D.J.. Mickey guards Sydney and falls for her, to McCall's dismay. McCall tries to find the .44 dealer. Jimmy, "Not my area...Sugar Fly Simon." Copy-cat calls are traced to the 74th precinct. Gant, Who used it? "Anyone with a quarter," answers a precinct policeman. The copy-cat goes after Tessor and Abmennet, who go after Sydney.
11	11	"Desperately"	Donald Petrie	Charles Grant Craig	December 4, 1985	61221	12.4/20
Robert is ill. "Pharmacy, Mr. McCall." Harvey starts pitching useless products; negative ion machines, gravity boots, electric vibrating socks. Desperate housewife Allison Webster is lured by a stranger, Geoffery Dryden, into breaking into an apartment where he murders a man. Pantero, who followed, grabs Dryden and tells him off. Allison's friend Samantha Page helps her contact The Equalizer, who deduces he is a professional hit-man. He convinces her to report to the authorities. A police lieutenant assures them, "We'll get him." McCall doesn't seem convinced. Allison is worried he'll find out where she lives, and doesn't know how to tell her husband Ross. McCall asks Dana Caldrin for intelligence on the hit-man's identity. Dana also gets the name Macklin, who hired him. Dana's working girl contact Sindee provides more first-hand "crazy, monster-ama, weird" details. McCall must track down Dryden before he kills both Allison and Samantha.
12	12	"Reign of Terror"	Richard Compton	Story by : Steve Bello; Teleplay by : Steve Bello & Coleman Luck	December 11, 1985	61220	13.2/22
Doctor Timms quits the hood because he's just too tired of dealing with Crips thugs "Head", "Primo," "Rat Heart" and the rest. The incoming Dr. Elly Walton refuses to pay their drug tribute, so her nurse Irma Portman calls The Equalizer. Dr. Walton sends McCall away from her free clinic; she doesn't want "another man with a gun." So, McCall visits Immanuel Pena, who he helped defect from Cuba twelve years ago. McCall hears Pena's story of torture and forgiveness, and why he stopped carrying a gun. Dr. Walton calls the precinct asking for her friend and old flame, Lt. Mason Warren. Mason confronts the gang, beats up Head, and warns them to leave Elly alone. But he hasn't worked the local 3rd street precinct in years. So the Crips intimidate all her patients instead. Rat Heart even prevents Mr. and Mrs. Sanchez from taking their six month-old baby girl for a life-saving treatment. McCall must strategize on how to defeat them without using lethal force.
13	13	"Back Home"	Alan Metzger	Story by : Neil Cohen; Teleplay by : Joel Surnow & Maurice Hurley	December 18, 1985	61209	13.6/23
Resident thugs Ben and Joe terrorize elderly residents of a rundown apartment block with a Dobermann. Monty Wynn plays cards with Mrs. Washburn waiting for his wife Lilly, then calls The Equalizer to end the harassment from landlord and bank owner Guthrie Browne. McCall has George Cook protect them. McCall asks Treasury Department bank examiner Wilhite about Knickerbocker Trust and Guthrie. To surveil Guthrie, McCall poses as a customer to Eileen Arden and talks to his limo driver to plant a bug. Guthrie meets a dubious character. Enter Sterno, and his "creamy pork puppy" (cream cheese, sauerkraut, hotdog). McCall, "License numbers, car numbers. I want names and faces put to them." He discovers that Guthrie hired hit-man Karn to kill his estranged wife Andrea Browne. Lt. Mason Warren plants information to misdirect anyone checking on McCall. Sterno helps McCall arrange a disturbance at Browne's bank which prompts Browne to order the building to be torched. The race is on to get everyone to safety and save the building.
14	14	"Out of the Past"	Richard Compton	Cyrus Nowrasteh	January 15, 1986	61224	12.2/20
Ex-con Fenn picks up Eddie Washburn and throws him a get-out-of-prison party, complete with cake and call girls; Gloria and her "twin sister" Gretchen. But Eddie is desperately ill and Gloria doesn't want that business! Eddie is dying and dreaming of vengeance. He harasses Walter Wesley who testified against him. Walter's wife Kay calls McCall for protection. Kay is McCall's ex-wife, and mother to their son Scott. McCall enlists Eddie's parole officer, Michael Cub. They find Eddie and Fenn at Mothers piano bar, named for its proprietor, Mother. Cub roughs Eddie up and warns him away from Walter. Eddie remains undeterred. After Eddie shoots Cub, Walter confesses to being more than just a witness against Eddie, and McCall arranges a meeting to resolve their grievances.
15	15	"Dead Drop"	Donald Petrie	Maurice Hurley & Joel Surnow	January 22, 1986	61230	13.3/22
An innocent florist, Barry Konig, is targeted after his name is marked on mail in a dead drop by doorman Sam Jacobs, who is stabbed by "the guy in the blue coat with the fur collar." Inspector Logan interrogates Barry as a suspect. A police detective says something "doesn't scan." He hands an advert to Barry, who calls after he is nearly killed. McCall assembles a team of contacts including Mickey Kostmayer, Jimmy, Dana Caldrin, Sterno, and Ginger Brock to stake out and tail anyone using the drops. Dana's girl Sindee provides the name Grant Lawseth, an NSA agent, who shows up at a diner to meet "red parka man." As they all try to reason with Lawseth to call off the hit on Barry, Control's nemesis Jason Masur shows up threatening to fire McCall's contacts. Regardless, after consideration they continue to help McCall to find "the big fish" in control of the ring. McCall reports his findings to Det. Mason at the 75th precinct, and warns Masur not to push Control or it will become personal.
16	16	"Wash Up"	Richard Compton	Mark Frost	January 29, 1986	61228	11.9/20
McCall is hired by two skyscraper window washers, Pete and Lenny DeWitt who are certain their boss Michael Riegert will kill them for forming a union. Complicating matters, McCall's housekeeper Lettie and her two sons, Jorge and Ishmael, temporarily move into his apartment. Sterno gives McCall Riegart's background. Riegart loses his contract with Gibson, putting him under pressure to square his debt with a mob boss. Riegert puts crank into coffee served by the bartender. Stan, the man at end of the counter, tells Riegert, "same old broken record," union talk. Torqued on crank, Riegert stabs Lenny and plants the switchblade on him. His bodyguard Rick backs his play. With two-against-one testimony, Lt. Isadore Smalls says "Do the math!" Smalls leads McCall to Big Ed, and to Ladonna Page, Rigert's battered woman. She agrees to help Jimmy and Alex set up Riegart for arrest.
17	17	"Torn"	Russ Mayberry	Story by : Joel Surnow & Maurice Hurley; Teleplay by : Carl Eastlake	February 5, 1986	61211	11.9/20
Jessie Moore asks Det. Smalls for protection from her abusive husband Mike, who is about to be released from prison, just as McCall shows up at the precinct. Detective Smalls says he has no client business there, until Jessie's young daughter Laura says she's the one who called him. Jason Masur also hires McCall to find Brian, who years ago betrayed McCall, sending Angela to her death. Masur says Brian needs money, and his paymaster is Veronica Whitney. McCall inquires about Whitney from a saleswoman, who happens to be her daughter. He's called away; Laura has disappeared. He gains insight from Mike's case worker O'Toole. Masur says Brian is meeting an arms dealer; McCall sets a trap for Shumway. He discusses Angela with Lettie, who comments on justice versus vengeance. With Brian on the run, and Mike coming home, McCall is torn on which case to close first.
18	18	"Unnatural Causes"	Alan Metzger	Story by : Susan Woollen; Teleplay by : Susan Woollen & Coleman Luck & Scott Shepherd	February 12, 1986	61233	11.7/19
Mrs. Lenox meets her date; he brought her an orchid. McCall is hired by aspiring actress Sally Ann Carter, who was duped by a flashy pimp, Anza Serrato. McCall warns him off. Francine Grant, a librarian helping McCall with research, becomes the latest victim of the Orchid Killer, who strangles lonely middle-aged women answering his "Mr. Goodheart" newspaper ad. A Patrolman tells McCall that Det. Smalls is in charge. He asks him for details, but he has none. Anza roughs Sally up, again. McCall contacts Jimmy who suggests going to Anza's boss Mr. Peters who works for "those guys." McCall contacts retired operative Kelly Sterling, who helps entrap the Orchid Killer.
19	19	"Breakpoint"	Russ Mayberry	Story by : Scott Shepherd; Teleplay by : Scott Shepherd & Don Carlos Dunaway	February 19, 1986	61226	13.2/22
At a wedding reception for Benjamin and Deborah Wade terrorists kidnap philanthropist Gustav Herant, taking four hostages and raffling freedom for the rest. McCall manages to remain, trading places with Gary Speer. Lieutenant Ferraro calls to negotiate. The terrorist leader wants a television first. Findlay analyzes wedding photos. Mickey tries circumventing the barricade cop. A reporter publicizes hostage names: Deborah Wade, City Councilman Frank Stevens, Gwen Hunter, Otis Hendricks, "and Gary Speer." The leader rants at the "traitor," Herant. Mickey storms the barricade; with PIZZA! Findlay recognizes him. Mickey, "McCall's in there...might as well be two." Findlay, "Ferraro says you're a loose grenade with no pin...he's right!" Stevens eyes a knife near a distracted terrorist. The leader warns him. Mickey tries the sewers, basement, vents. Deborah is assaulted by a terrorist. A "doctor" slips McCall a .22 pen-gun, and is shot. Saved by his vest he's thrown out; Otis too. Intent on stopping them, McCall starts with Deborah's molester. Mickey arrives late, but gets a shot in.
20	20	"No Conscience"	Richard Compton	Mark Frost	March 26, 1986	61231	10.6/20
McCall and Jimmy ride with independent cabbie Mr. Signorello to scare off racketeers with a camera; documentary-style. In a club, Vicki writes her number on a matchbook and gives it to a womanizer named Mitchell, who then gives it to Donna, or was it Dana. Mitch is kidnapped and beaten by an industrial spy, but has no clue what "it" is that they want. Given 36 hours to find "it" he hires McCall. They track down all the women who gave him their numbers, starting with Mary. Nope, she doesn't have "it." Shelly? No. The blonde on the phone? No; that's not her. Mitch sees Vicki's friend Theresa and remembers the matchbook. They check on Vicki and find "it" but she's been killed. McCall has Jimmy analyze "it" and finds a microdot, but Theresa swaps it. McCall discovers the switch after his new contact Mr. Signorello reports in. McCall and Mitch have to take a big gamble with the spy and her thugs. Mitch tells McCall he's going to settle down; "Hi Mitch... I'm Chris... I'm Diane."
21	21	"Unpunished Crimes"	Alan Metzger	John Burke & Grenville Case	April 1, 1986	61227	11.1/20
Frank Donahue, inventor of a fuel injector, claims IP theft by Penatrax CEO Stuart Cane. Whitney says they never settle nuisance cases. Presented a logbook as proof, Cane sends Whitney and Gerry Brennan out of the office, ostensibly on errands, giving Cane a chance destroy the logbook and fake a knife attack. Frank is hauled out. After they burn his remaining records, his young son Rick calls The Equalizer. Frank's workshop is sabotaged causing an explosion, so his frustrated wife Susan leaves with his eldest son Ed. To help his client Rick save his family, McCall invites them all to stay at his home for the moment. Sterno gives McCall intelligence on Cane, including ties to Red Wind terrorists led by Gianni Greco. McCall enlists Greco to run a game on Cane to uncover his unpunished crimes, with a little help from other CEOs, Charles Webber, George Cox, and Richard Phillips.
22	22	"Pretenders"	Richard Compton	Scott Shepherd	April 8, 1986	61234	10.8/20
Rookie reporter Beth Mackie suspects her neighbor John Parker of criminal activity. Officer Dysan, eyeing an empty wine bottle, asks "Were you alone last night?" and suggests earplugs. Beth's editor Brian Barclay doesn't see a story. Her jerk colleague Flynn just hits on her. Her sympathetic colleague Dack refers her to The Equalizer. McCall suspects she just wants a story. A man is harried and dragged from Parker's apartment. The first guy assures her, he just had "too much to drink." Parker sees, and threatens Beth. McCall warns Parker directly, then talks to Det. Smalls, who surreptitiously displays Parker's file. Jimmy says he's using a false identity and is protected by Control. McCall asks Karen at the Agency to find Parker's file. Karen, "We hit a little snag...I can't help you any longer. Classified. Notify Supervisor." Beth's friend Cynthia tries to relay what she saw in the apartment she sublet to Parker, but Cynthia is killed and Beth narrowly escapes. McCall gets Beth to a safe-house, and discovers Parker's plot, but not before Beth gets into trouble.

== Cast and characters ==
=== Main ===
- Edward Woodward as Robert McCall
- Keith Szarabajka as Mickey Kostmayer

=== Recurring ===
- Ray Baker as Dana Caldrin
- Robert Blumenfeld as Wilhite
- Jack Gilpin as Harvey
- Robert Joy as Jacob Stock
- Robert Lansing as Control
- Roma Maffia as Sindee
- Mark Margolis as Jimmy
- Irving Metzman as Sterno
- Ron O'Neal as Lt. Isadore Smalls
- Saul Rubinek as Jason Masur
- Yvonne Wilder as Lettie
- Steven Williams as Lt. Jefferson Burnett
- Fred Williamson as Lt. Mason Warren
- William Zabka as Scott McCall

=== Notable guest stars ===
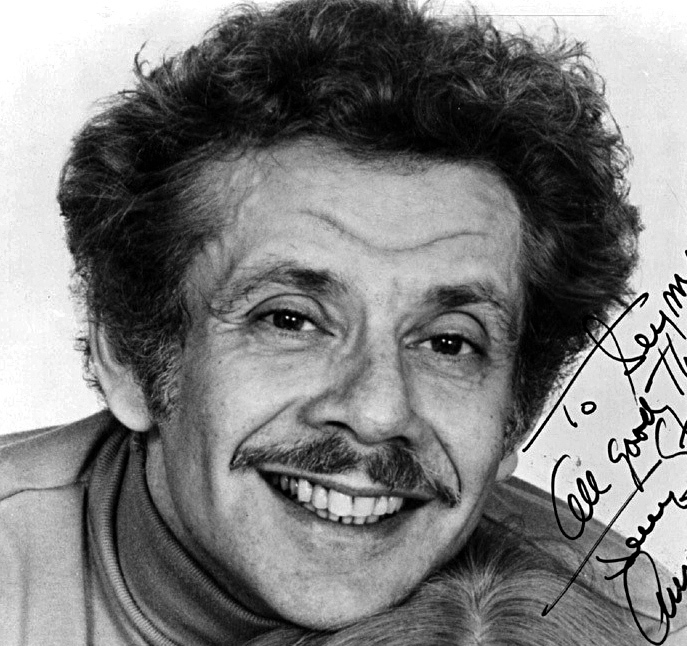
Stiller

- Patricia Kalember as Carlene Randall, an art teacher who is being stalked.
- Michael Levin as Leonard Morgan, the Senior VP of Manhattan Telecommunications, which he uses for nefarious ends.
- Jerry Stiller as Brahms, a Company man who helps crack a computer code for his friend Robert, to whom he gave the nick name, "The Equalizer."
- George Hearn as Senator Jim Blanding, a Presidential candidate who has dirty laundry at risk of exposure.
- David Proval as Detective Lt. Goldman, who wants to help Carlene Randall, but cannot until a crime is actually committed.
- Paul Jabara as Scott McCall's music teacher.
- Carrie Kei Heim as Sarah, Carlene Randall's daughter.
- David Labiosa as Cristolides, a rogue Company agent who once trusted McCall.
- Casey Biggs as agent Mason, who chases Cristolides to recover intel.
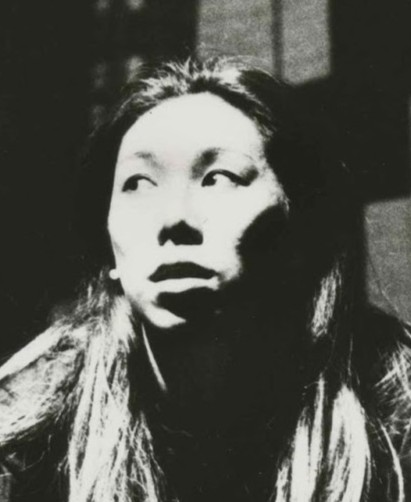
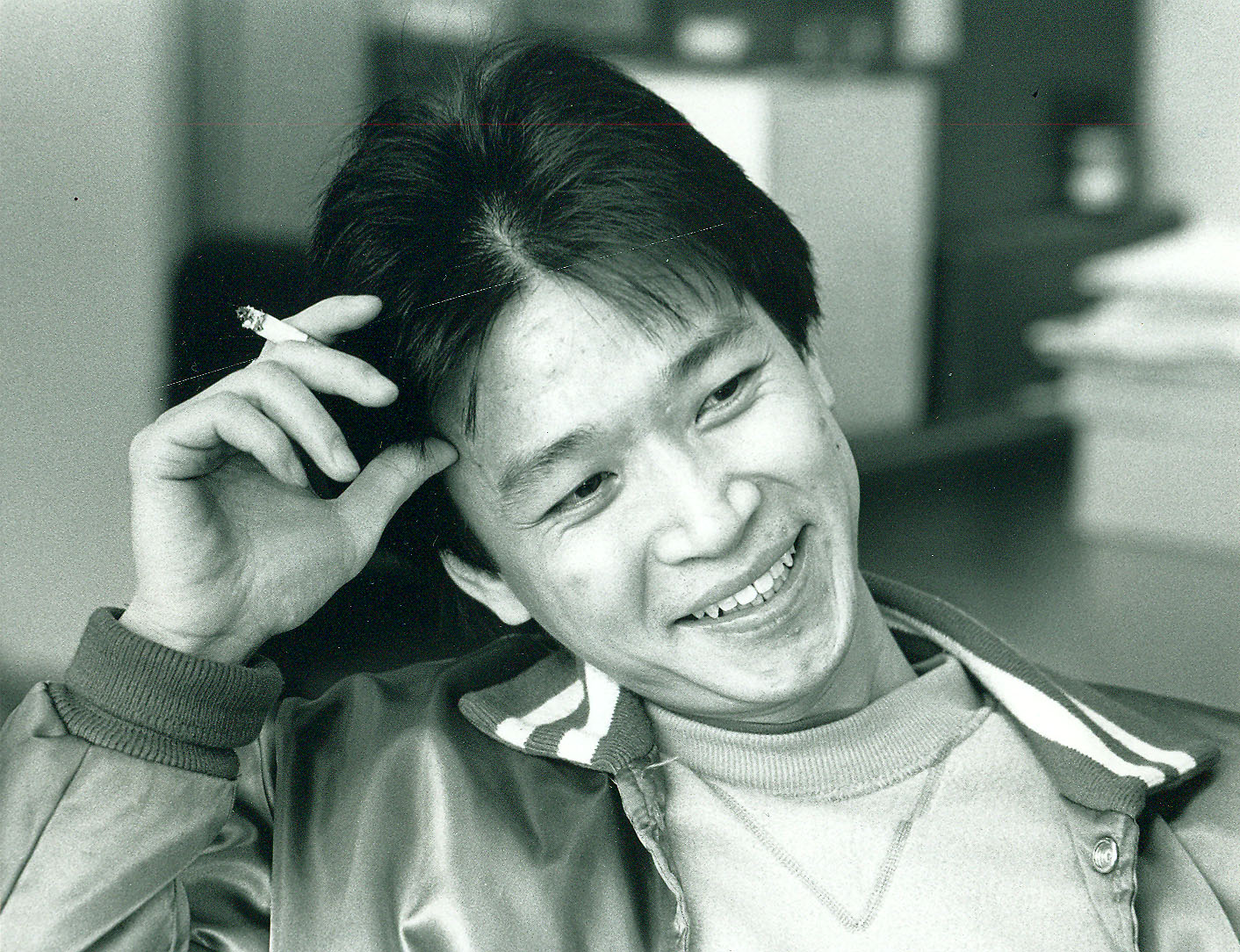
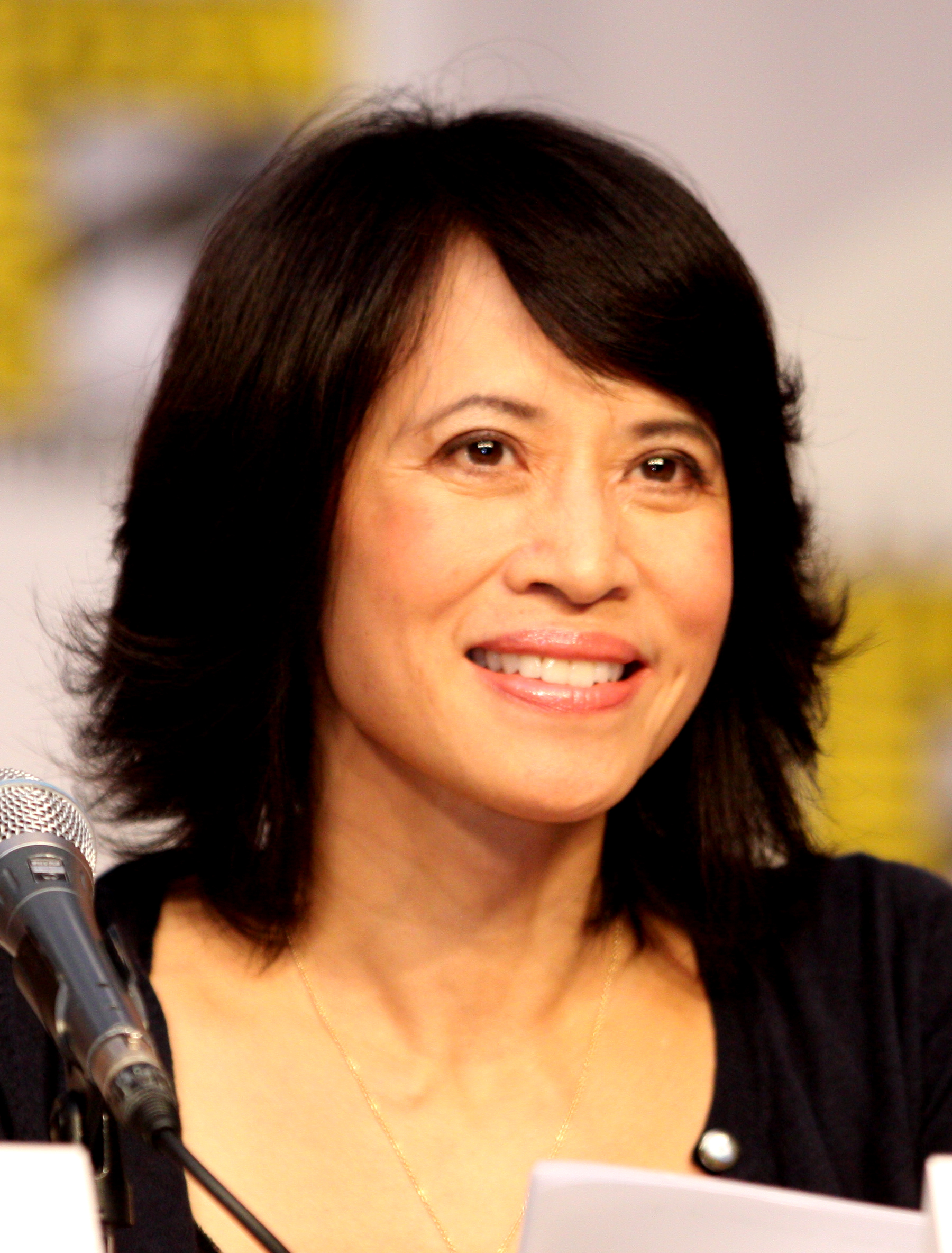
Lauren Tom, Tzi Ma & Jodi Long
- Lauren Tom as Mrs. Tom, a maid whose son Vincent is kidnapped while working for an affluent Chinese-American couple, the Lins.
- Tzi Ma as Mr. Lin, who is unwilling to pay the ransom on Mrs. Tom's son Vincent.
- Jodi Long as Mrs. Lin, who seems more interested in preparing for their party than recovering Vincent.
- James Russo as a Police Detective, who tactlessly disparages their chances of recovering Mrs. Tom's child alive.
- Ching Valdes as Tommy Li, an Agency asset from Hong Kong's heroin-smuggling underworld, who Robert McCall's utilized in his previous espionage career.
- Kevin Gray as Dal, a nightclub bartender.
- Karen Akers as Cynthia, the nightclub's so-named Head of Personal Relations.
- Donald Li as Joe Boy, the leader of the "Joe Boys" New York Chinatown gang.
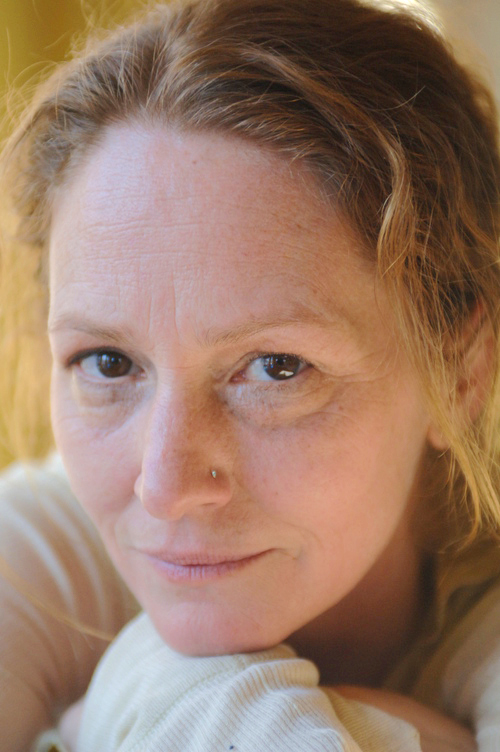
M. Leo
- Melissa Leo as Irina Dzershinsky, a Russian ballerina, whose father Felix wants to defect to the West.
- Joe Silver as Felix Dzershinsky, Irena's father and Trade Attaché clerk at the Russian Consulate in NYC, who is trying to defect to the United States.
- J. T. Walsh as Sam Griffith, a businessman visiting NYC with his wife Eleanor and teen daughter Eddie.
- Maureen Anderman as Eleanor Griffith, wife of Sam and mother of teen daughter Eddie.
- Adam Ant as Francis DeGraumont, a ruthless villain who uses his henchman, Ramon Scavosa, to abduct and traffick unsuspecting young women.
- Sara Botsford as Angelica, Robert McCall's girlfriend.
- Richard Portnow as a Police Detective Lieutenant in the NYPD.
- Lori Petty as Brandy, a hooker who provides clues and the definition of "Lock Box" to help recover kidnapped teen, Eddie.
- Daryl Edwards as a Police Officer, who directs the Griffiths to the Desk Sergeant.
- David Alan Grier as a Desk Sergeant at the NYPD precinct where the Griffith's await word of their abducted teen daughter, Eddie.
- Luis Guzmán as an unlicensed Gypsy Cabbie who drives away with the Griffiths' luggage.
- Jeff McCarthy as a Waiter.
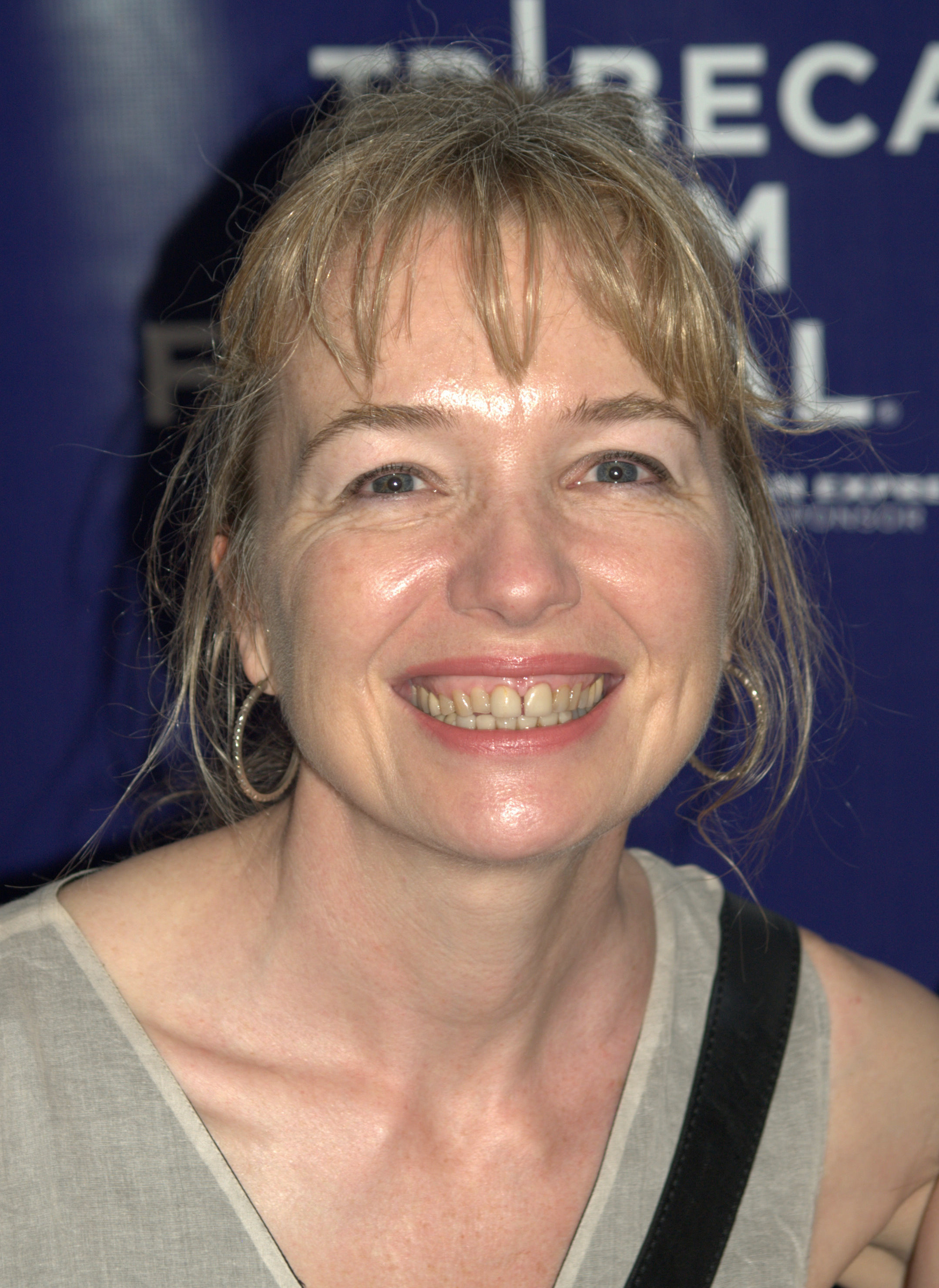
K. Young
- Karen Young as Officer Sandra Stahl, who, not wanting anything to do with dirty cops, consults her father and The Equalizer.
- Will Patton as Officer Nick Braxton, Sandra Stahl's new NYPD partner, who tries to induct her into his ring of dirty cops.
- Bruce MacVittie as Officer Frank Sergi, a dirty cop who answers to Nick Braxton.
- Esai Morales as Officer Miguel Canterra, a dirty cop who answers to Nick Braxton.
- Michael Higgins as Marvin Stahl, Sandra's father and former NYPD Sergeant who dealt with corrupt officers.
- Reginald VelJohnson as DJ Harmon Hunter, who is being threatened by loan sharks.
- Raynor Scheine as a Bum, who is shot by Braxton to implicate Stahl as an accomplice, thus extorting compliance.
- Miguel Piñero as a Superintendent of a tenement, who calls police regarding an elderly woman who died in her sleep.
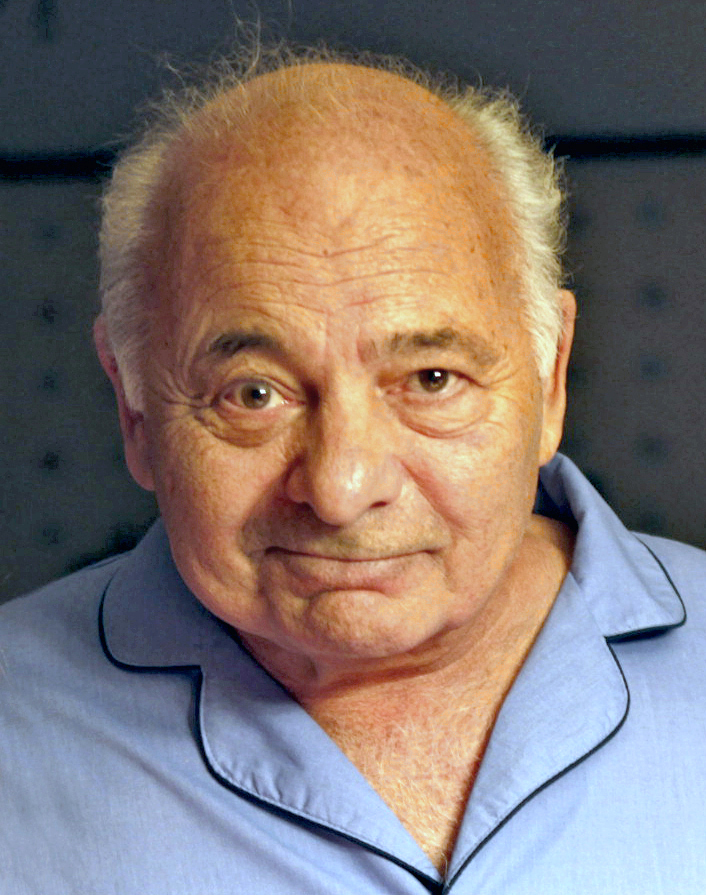
B. Young
- Burt Young as Louie Ganucci, an injured truck driver, who, without means to provide for his teen son Anthony, gets in trouble stealing contraband from the mafia.
- Lois Smith as Marie, who is endangered by her husband Louie Ganucci's actions.
- Kent Broadhurst as Noble, a contraband smuggler conducting his own racket, outside of mafia control.
- Gary Howard Klar as Purcell, Noble's "muscle" henchman.
- Joseph Wiseman as Eddie Vanessi, a "wise guy" mob boss trying to control everything in his territory, including Noble's racket.
- John Capodice as Father Antonelli, who calls The Equalizer to help parishioner Henrietta Fields.
- Anne Jackson as Henrietta Fields, an eccentric former musical-comedy star, who believes someone is trying to kill her for her "treasure."
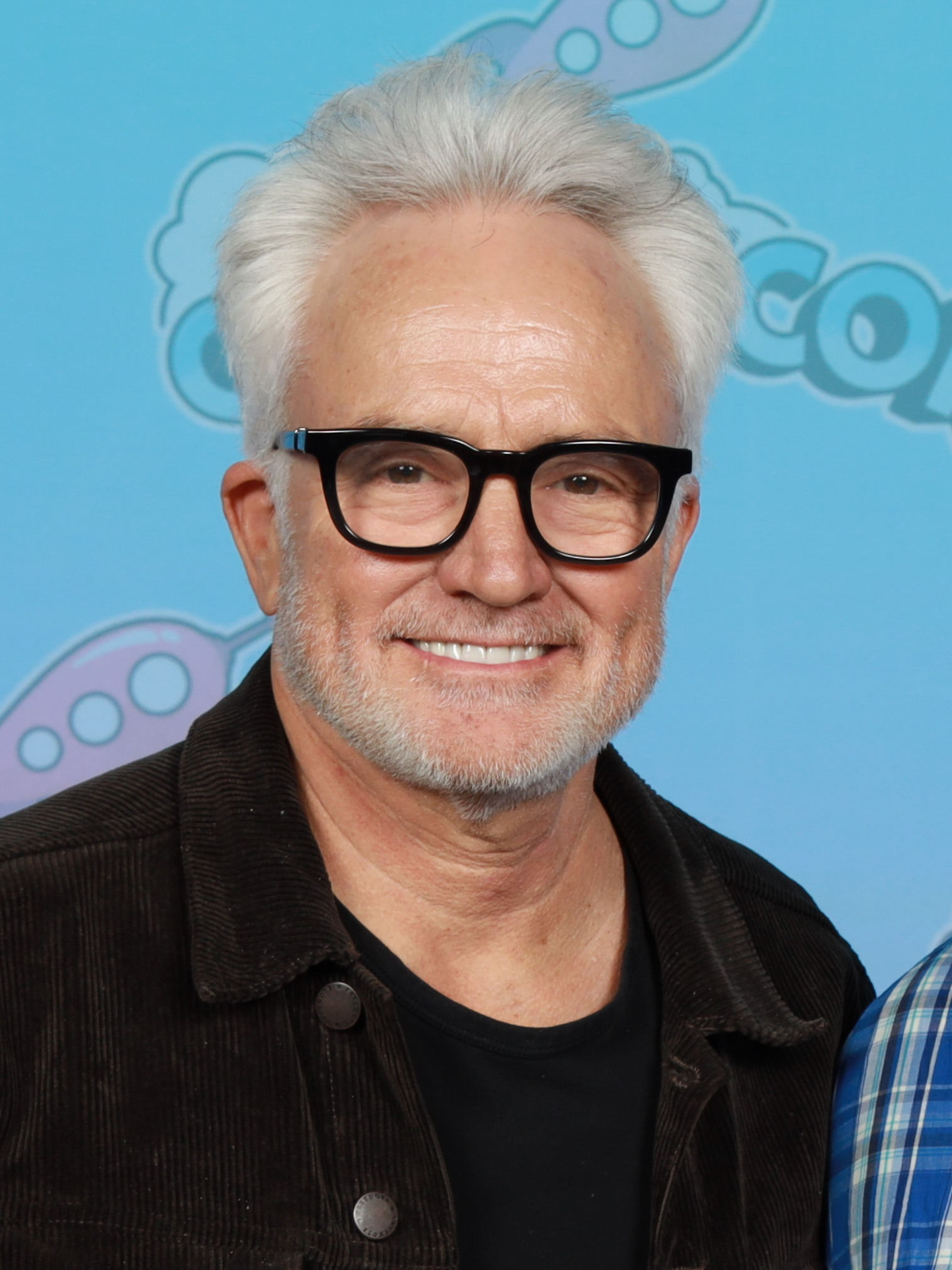
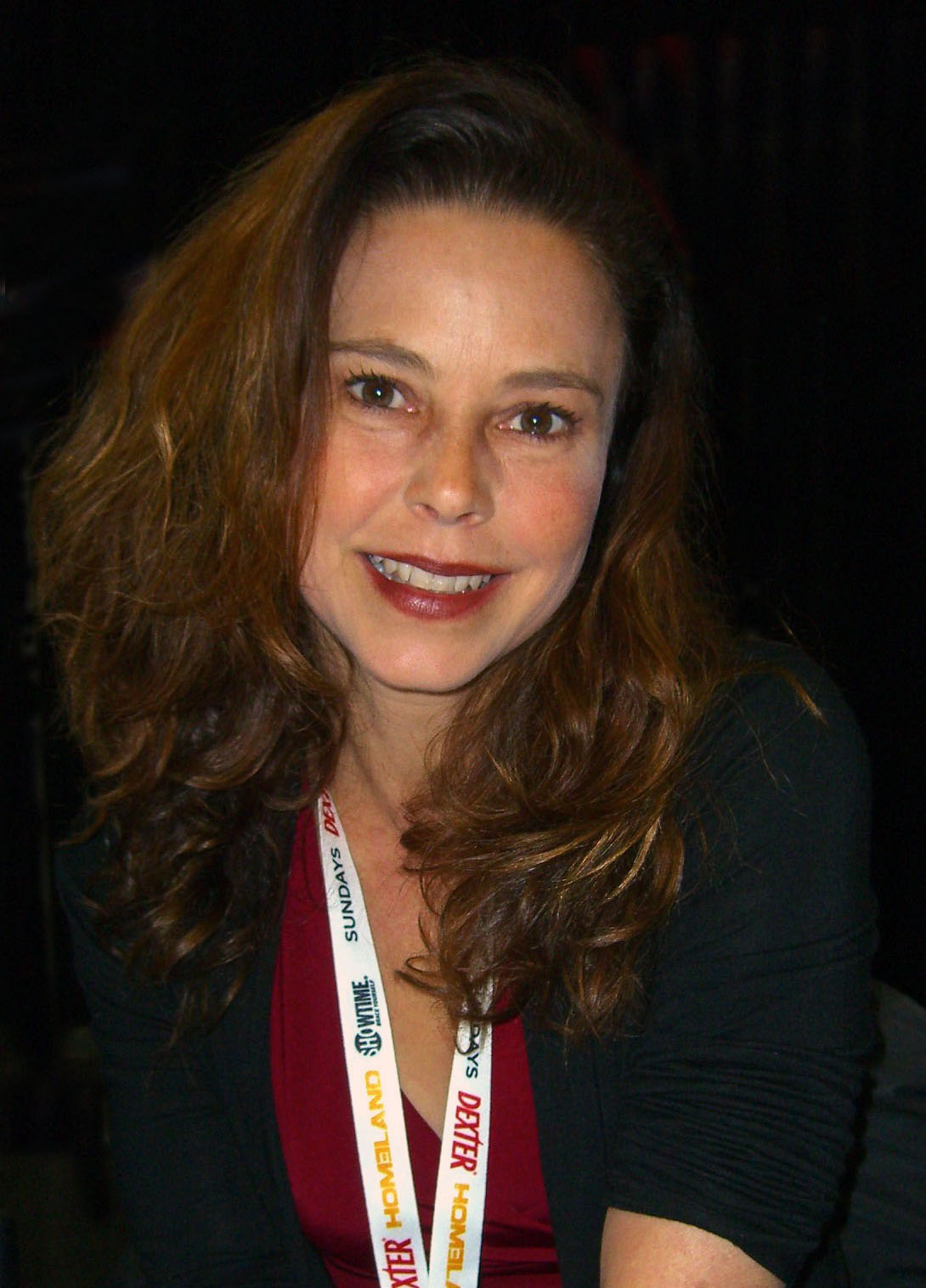
Barron & Whitford
- Dana Barron as Melinda, a hitch hiker traveling from Toronto to Boston with her boyfriend Jayck, who gets into a truck with a bad group.
- Bradley Whitford as Dillart, the leader of brutal young thugs who terrorize Melinda and Jayck.
- William Youmans as Ray, Dillart's accomplice.
- Perry Lang as Bobby, Dillart's accomplice.
- Ed O'Neill as a Doctor
- Ken Jenkins as Sheriff Stone
- Jon De Vries as Michael Rosa, a hit man whose main target is Vezay Holden, and whose secondary target is the woman he once loved, Carla Holden.
- Alberta Watson as Carla Holden, Vezay Holden's wife, and ex-lover of both Robert McCall and Michael Rosa.
- George Morfogen as Vezay Holden, an ambassador of an unnamed European nation.
- Bill Cobbs as Barry, a Company man who runs a bar containing a dead drop, which is used by Rosa to contact McCall.
- Lori Cardille as Sarah Claxton, who observes McCall and is involved with hit man Michael Rosa.
- Dee Hoty as a Hostess at Vezay Holden's diplomatic soirée.
- Frank Adonis as a Limo Driver (2 episodes).
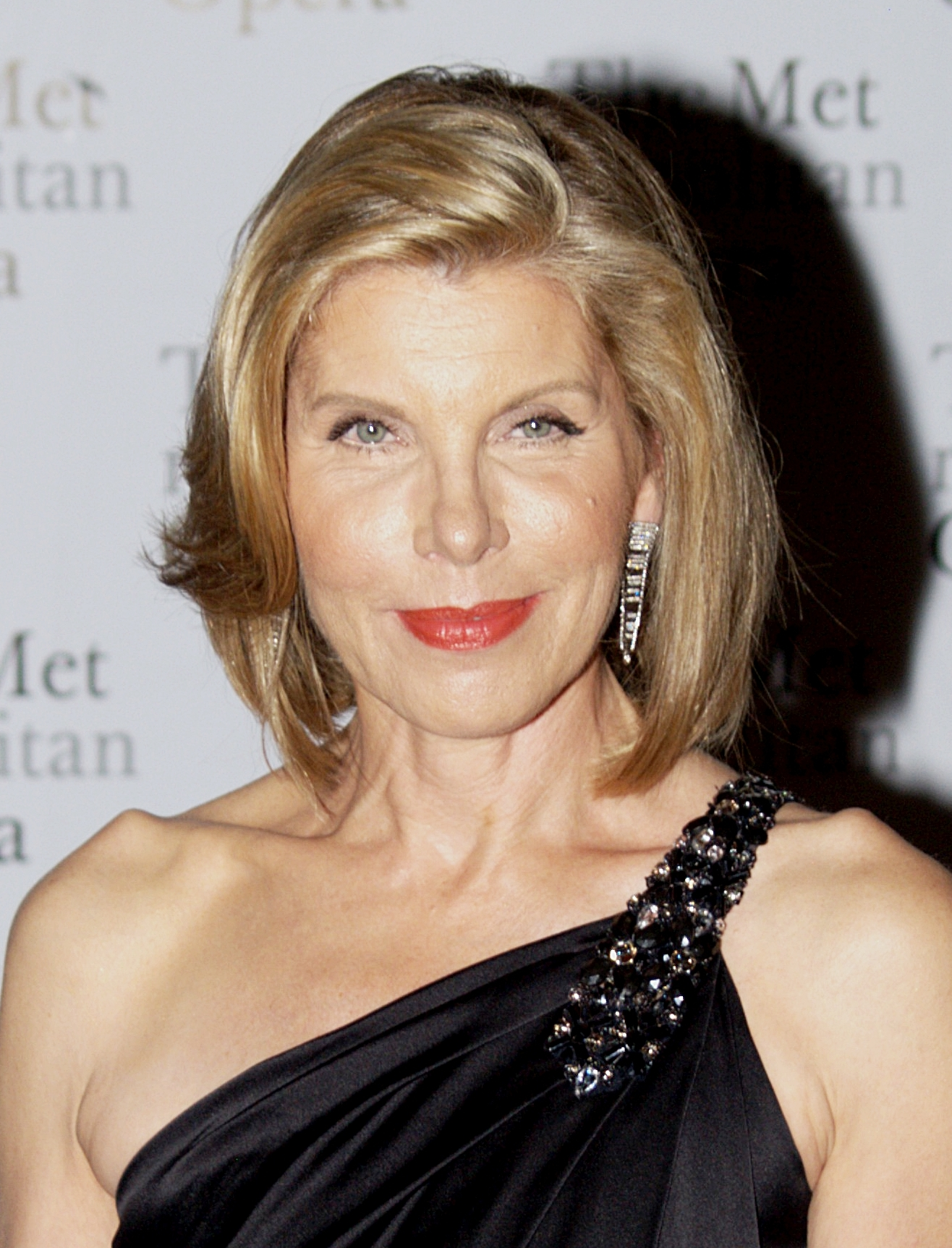
Baranski
- Christine Baranski as Victoria Baines, a successful advertising executive and single mother of her troubled teen son Ronald.
- Adam "Ad-Rock" Horovitz as Ronald, Victoria's teen son, who is mesmerized by Eugene Benton into becoming a drug dealer.
- Mark Soper as Eugene Benton, a "charming, ruthless, psychopath," martial artist drug dealer, who enlists Ronald.
- Richard Frank as 1st Client, to who Victoria Baines brags about her son Ronald.
- Bob Gunton as Jim Cronin, Victoria Baines' boss.
- Jim Dale as Gilbert, Victoria's disinterested ex-husband, to whom McCall and Vanessa must convince to help Ronald.
- J. Smith-Cameron as Vanessa, Gilbert's girlfriend.
- Alex Winter as Jeffrey Sims, Ron's friend, who uses too much drugs.
- Billy Wirth as Ralph, a dissatisfied drug buyer.
- Jill Larson as a Single Female at Gilbert's art gallery.
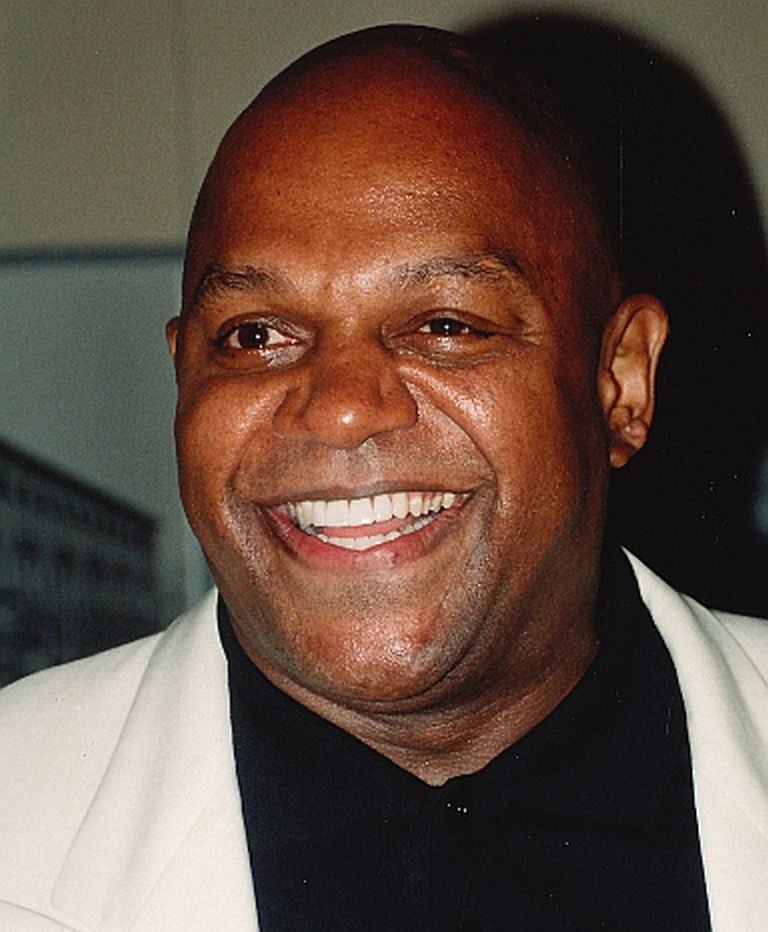
Dutton
- Brian Bedford as W. Donald Polk, a defense attorney turned vigilante, after courts fail to convict guilty defendants, leading to more crime.
- Charles Brown as Detective Sergeant Oliver Gant, who confronts McCall after a vigilante kills two thugs.
- Mark Baker as Thug #1, who skates on a murder rap, and immediately commits another crime by robbing an old lady.
- Joe Maruzzo as Thug #2, who is the first thug's accomplice. Maruzzo also plays "Head," the new Crips leader (after Andreas died), who terrorizes Doctor Elly Walton for not paying tribute with prescription drugs.
- Sylvia Kauders as an Old Lady, robbed by two thugs after dismissal of their murder charges.
- Mark Linn-Baker as Ronnie, who provides McCall brand-new, state-of-the-art, top-of-the-line electronics that traces incoming callers; an early implementation of caller ID.
- Charles S. Dutton as Abmennet, a criminal who uses "bump and run" tactics to rob drivers, such as foreign student Sydney Blake, after faking car/pedestrian accidents.
- Nathan George as Tessor, Abmennet's accomplice, who wants to avenge the death of a third accomplice called D.J., killed by Sydney Blake during a failed "bump and run" attempt.
- Geoff Pierson a Lawyer who advised Sydney Blake after her arrest.
- Meat Loaf as Sugar Fly Simon, an "alleged" dealer of illegal arms.
- Bobby Moresco as a Policeman in the 74th precinct.
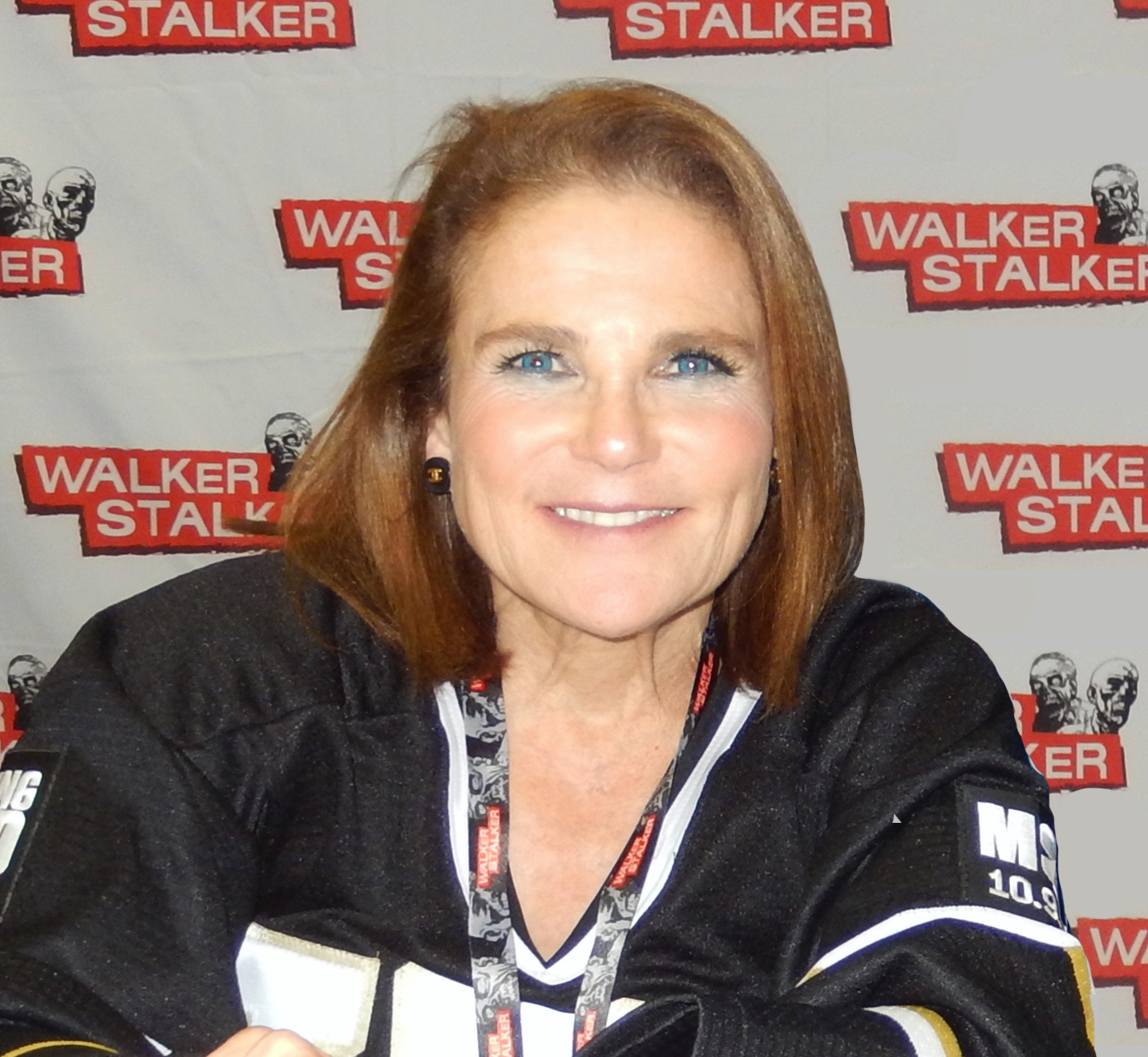
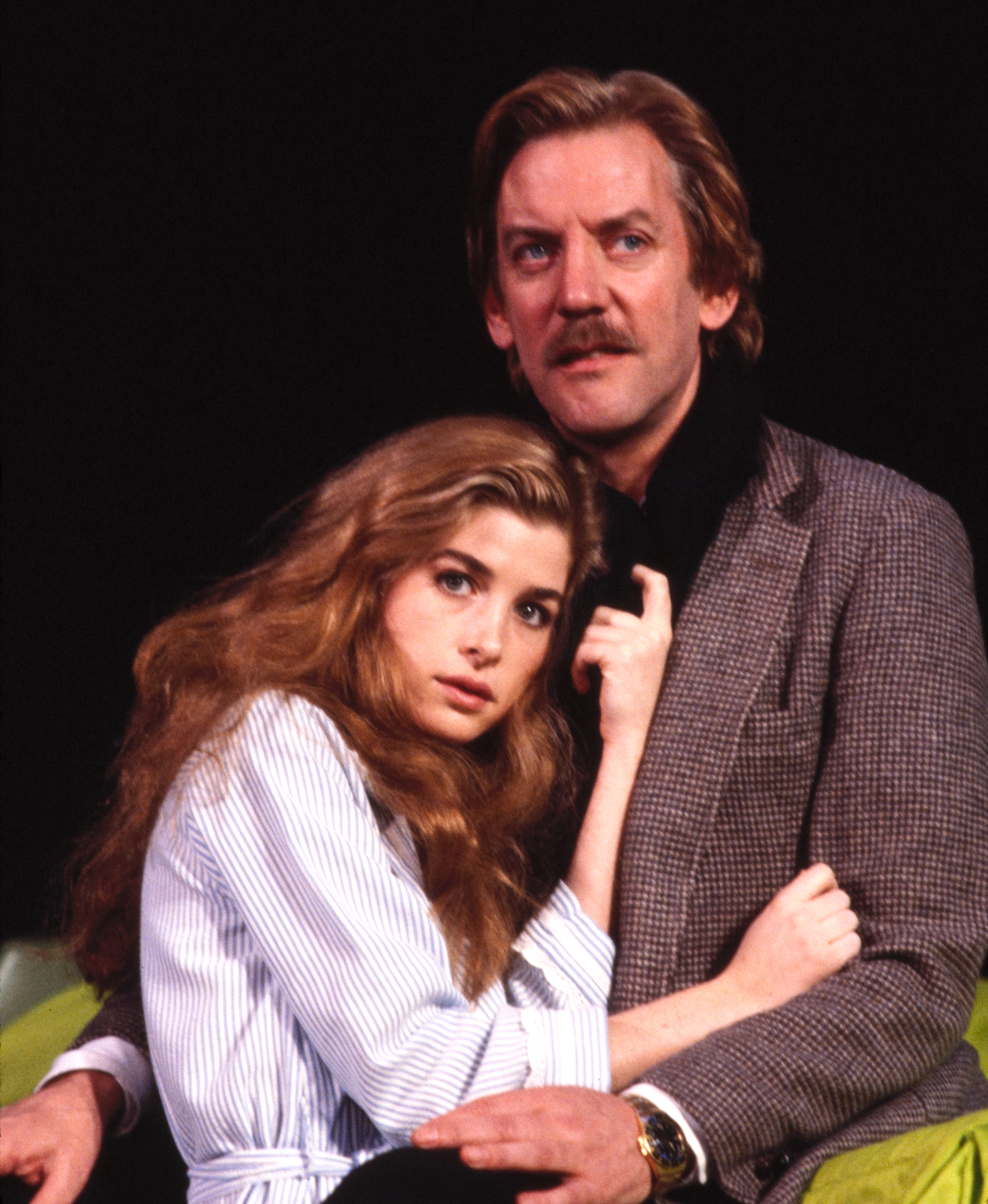
Baker & Feldshuh
- Blanche Baker as Allison Webster, a desperate housewife seeking more attention from her disinterested husband, Ross.
- Ray Sharkey as Geoffery Dryden, a charming but deranged hit man, who takes advantage of Allison's frustration.
- David Margulies as Macklin who employs Pantero and Dryden.
- Tovah Feldshuh as Samantha Page, Allison's friend who encourages her to seek diversion from marriage.
- Carlos Carrasco as Pantero, who tries to reign in Dryden to fulfill a contract killing.
- Lonette McKee as Doctor Elly Walton, an incoming free clinic volunteer, whom the Crips gang terrorizes after she refuses to pay tribute with prescription drugs.
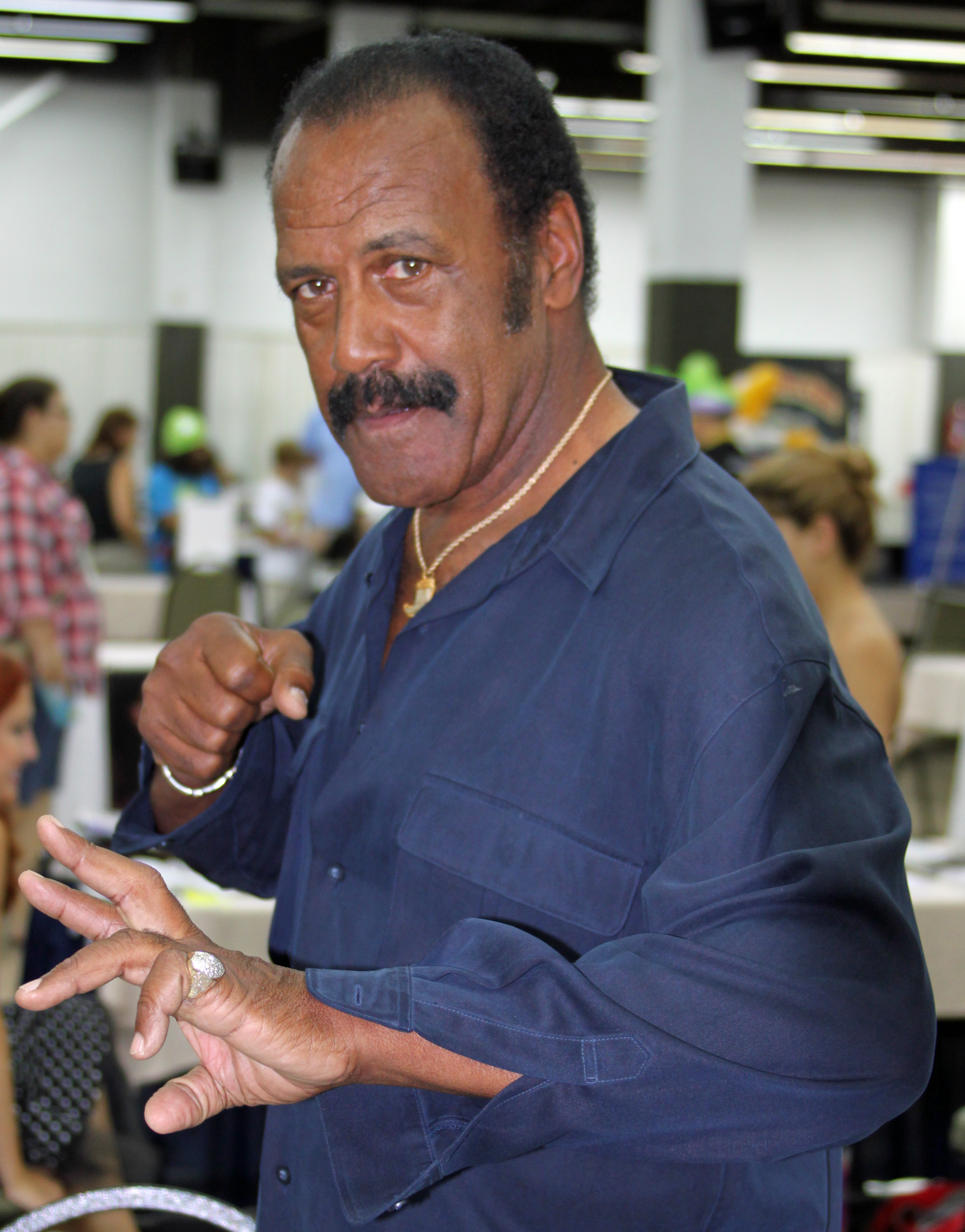
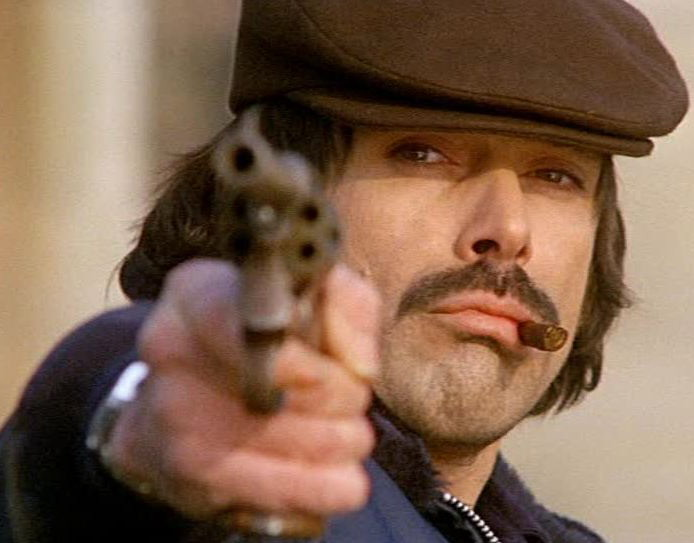
Milian & Williamson
- Tomas Milian as Immanuel Pena (aka Hernando Rodriguez), a Marxist former head of the Cuban Secret Police, who Robert McCall helped to defected to New York City, seeking redemption.
- Fred Williamson as Lt. Mason Warren, Elly Walton's old flame, who helps hold the Crips at bay, and also helps McCall against landlord Guthrie Browne.
- Lester Rawlins as Doctor Timms, who, being weary from gang activity, retires from his practice.
- Rosemary De Angelis as Irma Portman, Timms' nurse, who knows the Crips' routine, and calls McCall to put an end to it.
- Paul Calderón as Rat Heart, a Crips gang member.
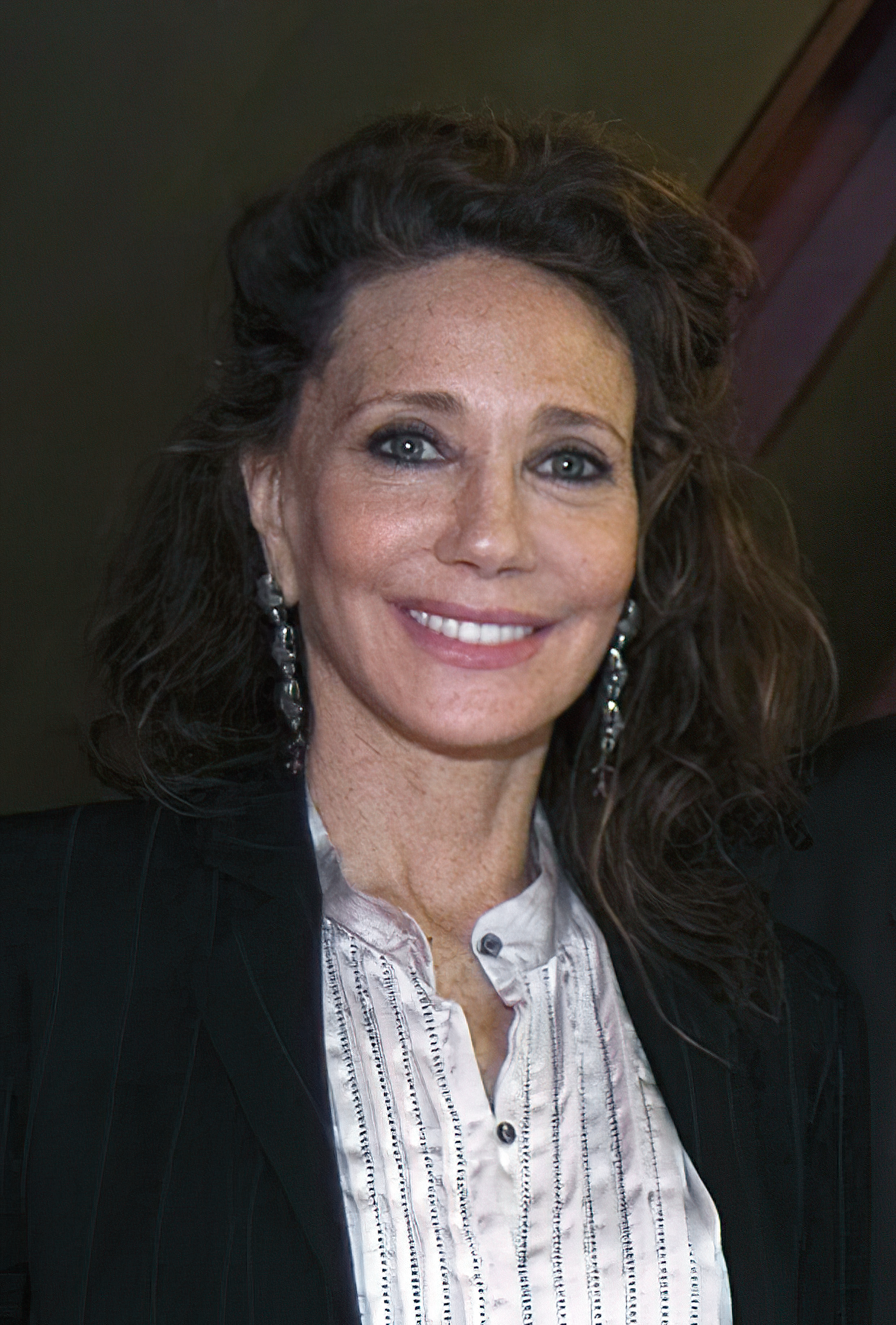
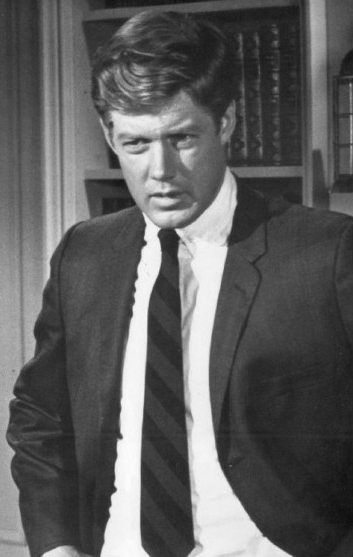
Converse & Berenson
- Frank Converse as Guthrie Browne, a bank owner and villainous landlord.
- Allen Swift as Monty Wynn, a senior harassed to move by Guthrie to redevelop his tenement property.
- Anne Pitoniak as Lilly, Monty's wife who is also harassed to move by Guthrie's thugs.
- Charles Hallahan as George Cook, who McCall has tasked with keeping the Wynn's safe while he investigates.
- Marisa Berenson as Andrea Browne, Guthrie's estranged and battered wife.
- Jude Ciccolella as Joe, a thug hired by Guthrie to harass tenants.
- Paul Herman as Ben, another thug hired by Guthrie to harass tenants.
- Jean DeBaer as Eileen Arden, who works at Guthrie's bank.
- Helen Hanft as Mrs. Washburn, who with her husband, is also a concerned tenant.
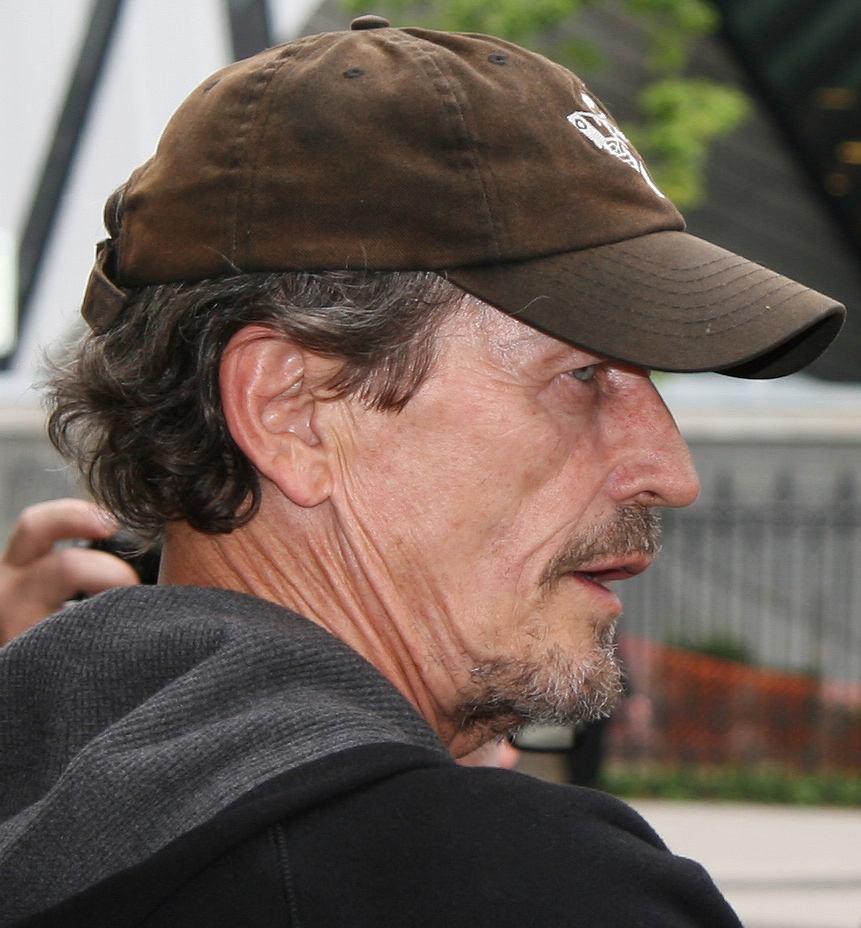
McHattie
- Sandy Dennis as Kay Wesley, Robert McCall's ex-wife and mother of their son Scott.
- Barry Primus as Walter Wesley, Kay's new husband.
- Stephen McHattie as Eddie Washburn, a deranged, terminally ill felon seeking revenge on Walter for testifying against him.
- James Gammon as Michael Cub, Eddie's parole officer who tries to keep Walter safe from Eddie.
- Brad Dourif as Fenn, Eddie's ex-con friend who doesn't want to see Eddie return to prison.
- Sylvia Miles as Mother, a singer who runs Mothers piano bar.
- Jasmine Guy as Gloria, a call girl Fenn hires for Eddie.
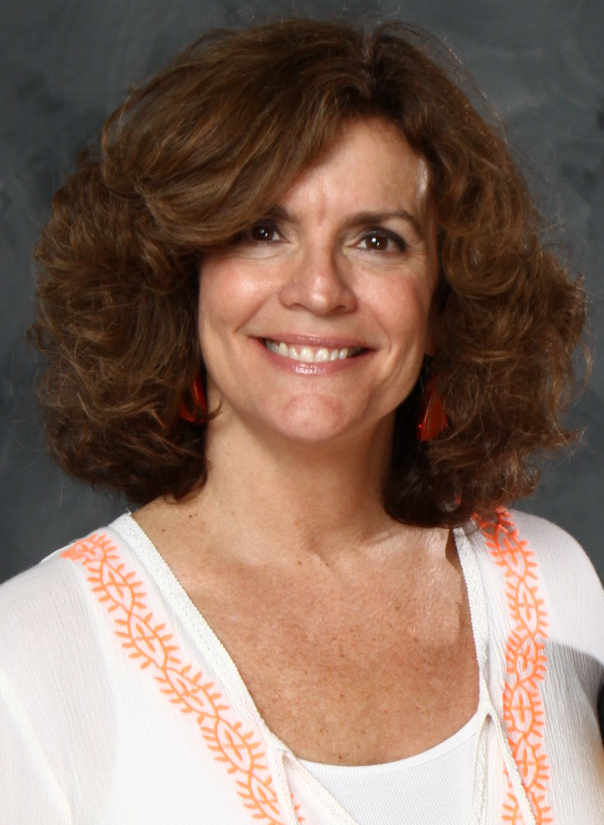
Curtis
- James Murtaugh as Barry Konig, a florist who needs protection from spies using a dead drop.
- Robin Curtis as Ginger Brock, a Company agent who has history with Mickey Kostmayer from a prior mission that resulted in the death of her colleagues, which initially complicates their working relationship.
- James Eckhouse as Steve, the "big fish" dead drop ringleader.
- Robert O'Reilly as Fur Collar Man, who utilizes the dead drops.
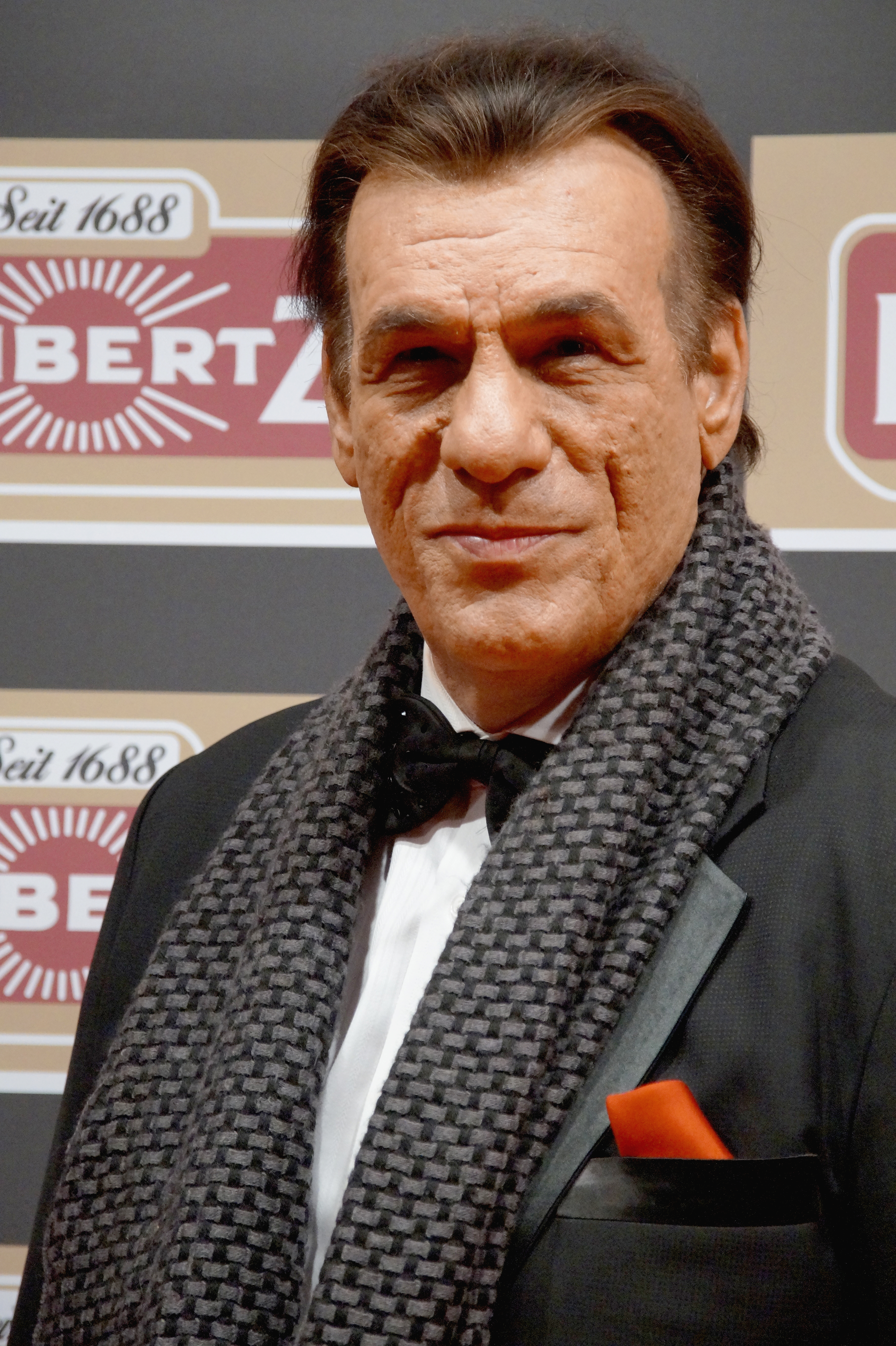
Davi
- Brian Tarantina as Lenny DeWitt, a skyscraper window washer who believes his boss has tried to kill him and his coworker Pete for forming a union.
- Robert Davi as Michael Riegert, Lenny's and Pete's villainous boss.
- Michael O'Hare as Alex, who is enlisted by McCall to help Jimmy.
- Joe Spinell as a mob boss who pressures Riegert to repay his debts.
- John Michael Bolger as a Bartender.
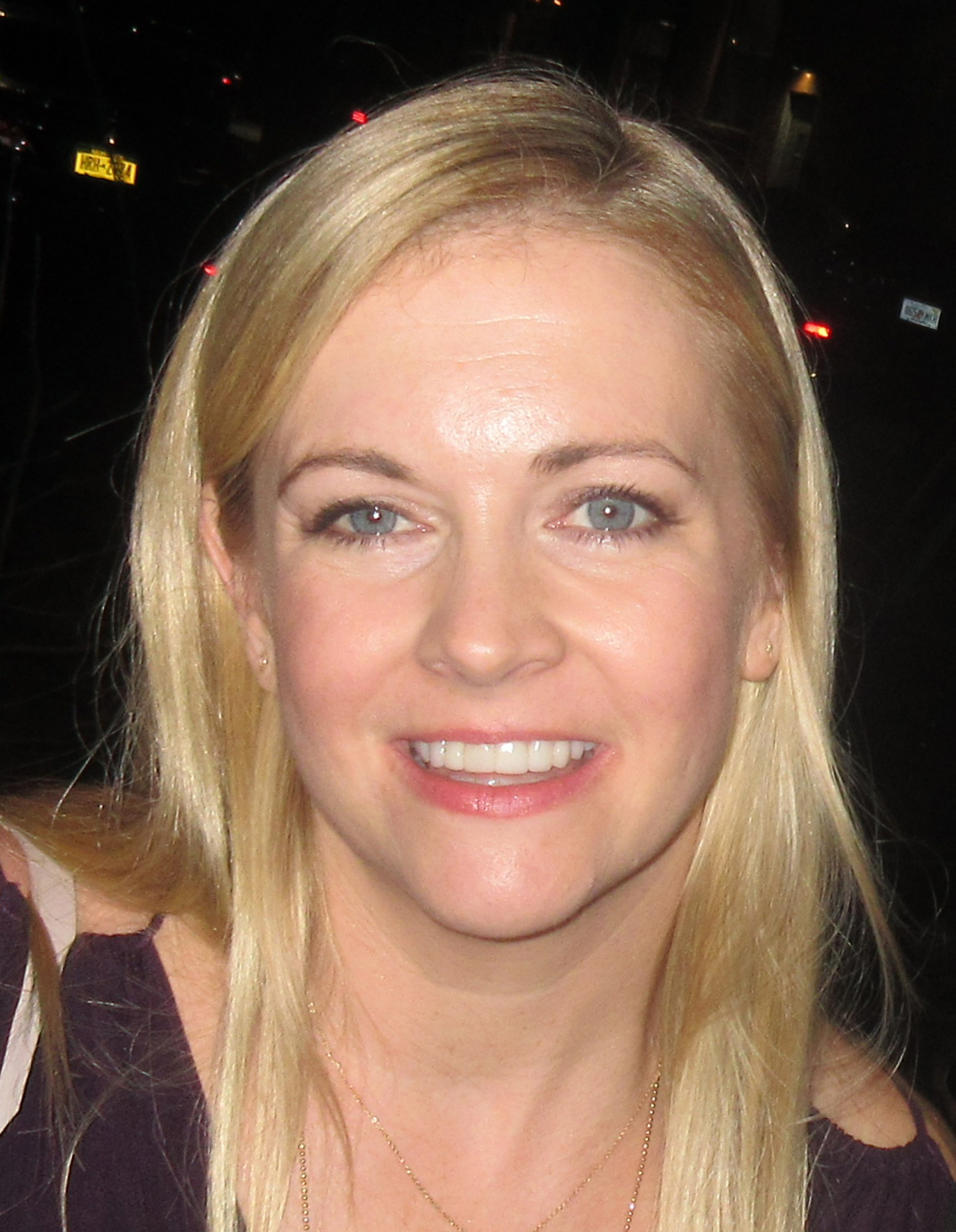
Hart
- Melissa Joan Hart as Laura Moore, a young girl who McCall protects from her abusive, ex-con father, Mike Moore.
- Caitlin Clarke as Jesse, Laura's mother.
- Zohra Lampert as Veronica Whitney, who pays for Brian's illegal arms deal.
- Charles Knox Robinson as Brian, who betrayed McCall's friend Angela years ago.
- Robert John Burke as O'Toole, Mike Moore's case worker.
- Patricia Richardson as an unnamed Woman, who identifies herself to McCall as Veronica's daughter.
- Kim Delaney as Sally Ann Carter, an aspiring actress who was taken in by a flashy but ruthless pimp, Anza Serrato.
- Bobby DiCicco as Anza Serrato, a pimp.
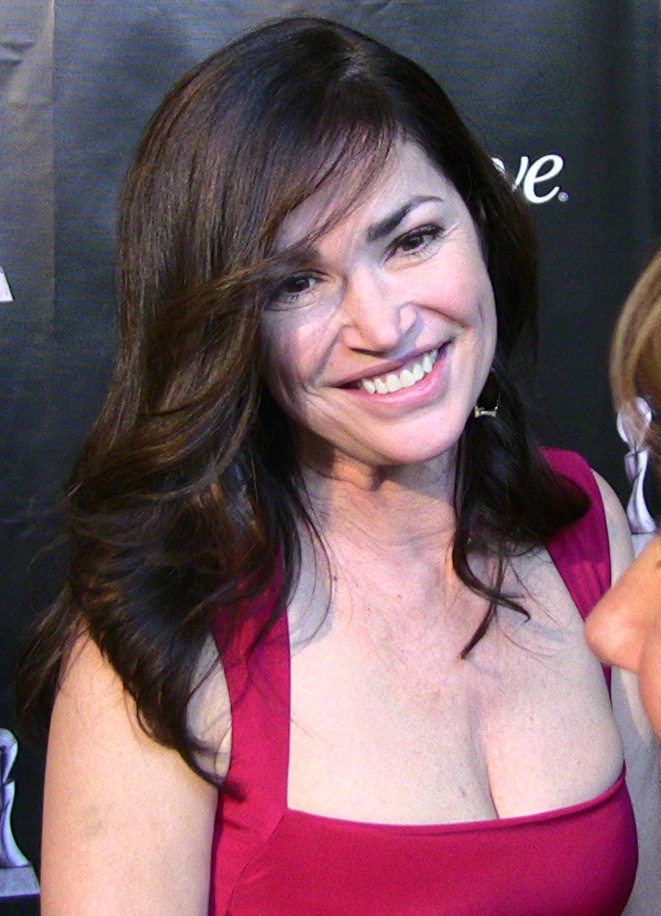
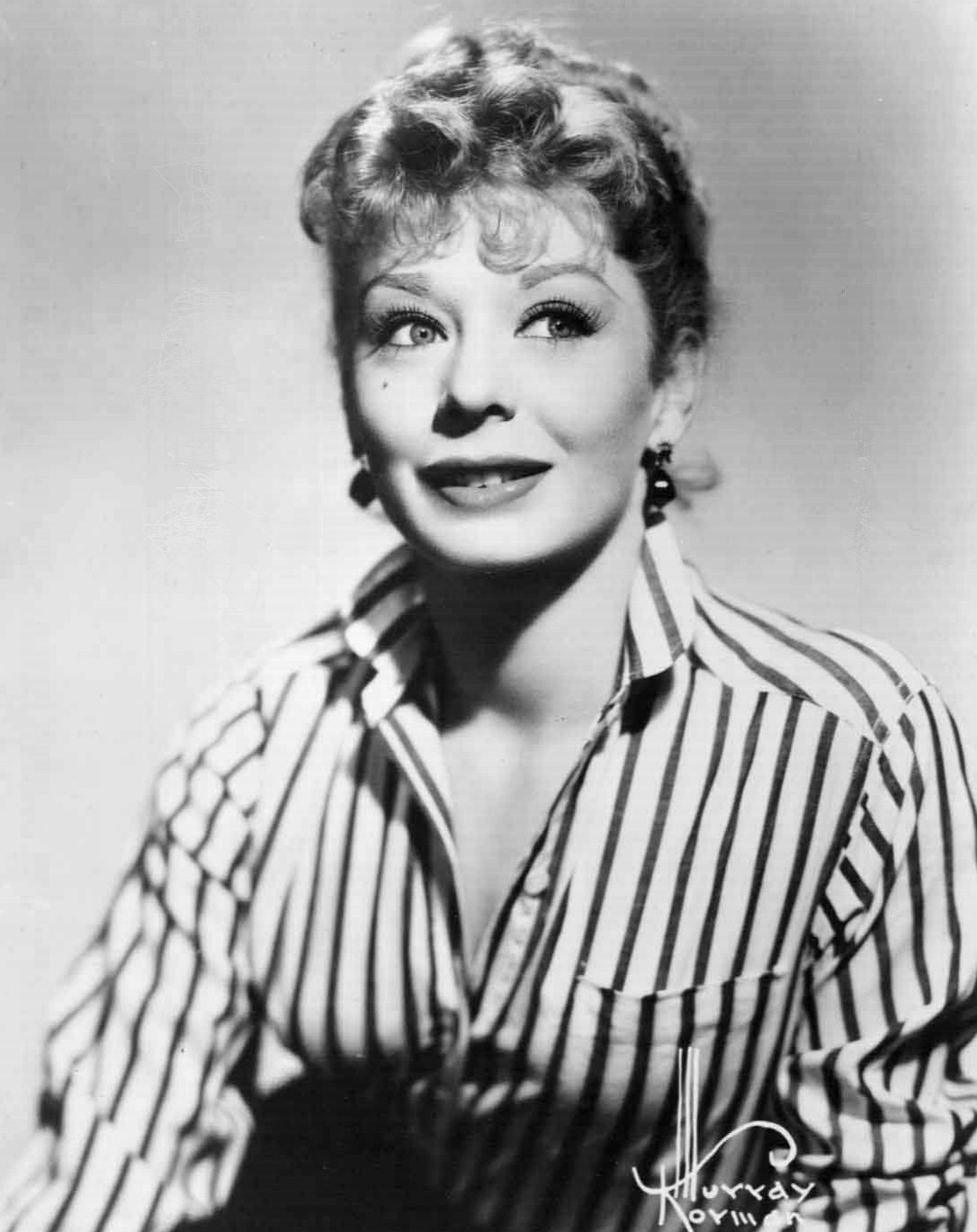
Verdon & Delaney
- Gwen Verdon as Kelly Sterling, an older, retired Company operative who helps McCall set a trap for the serial "Orchid" killer.
- Kevin Geeras the Orchid Killer
- Lynn Milgrim as Mrs. Lenox, one of the Orchid Killer's victims.
- Joe Lisi as a Patrolman.
- Patricia Clarkson as Deborah Wade, Benjamin's new bride who conspires with McCall to out-think the terrorists and act when the time is right.
- Tony Shalhoub as an unnamed Terrorist Leader; a cold, calculating, and focused ideologue who stops at nothing to secure his target, Gustav Herant.
- Aharon Ipalé as Gustav Herant, a philanthropist, and the only hostage the terrorists want kept safe to try, convict, and execute as a traitor.
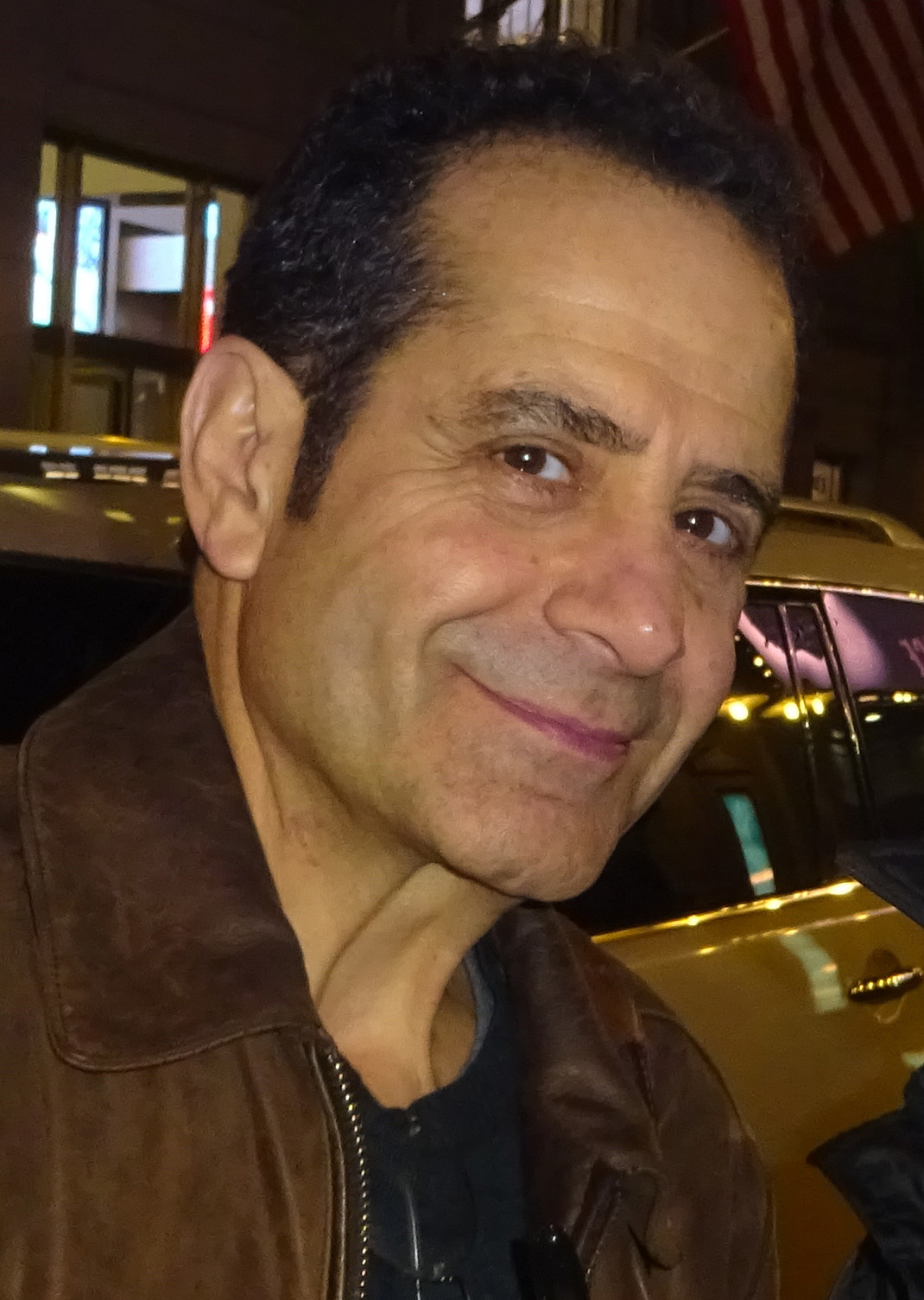
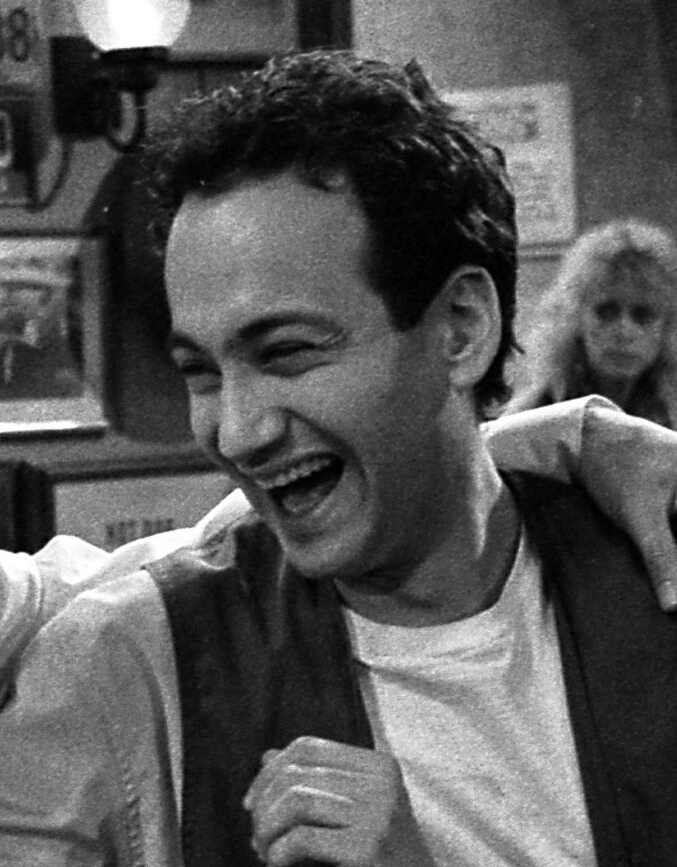
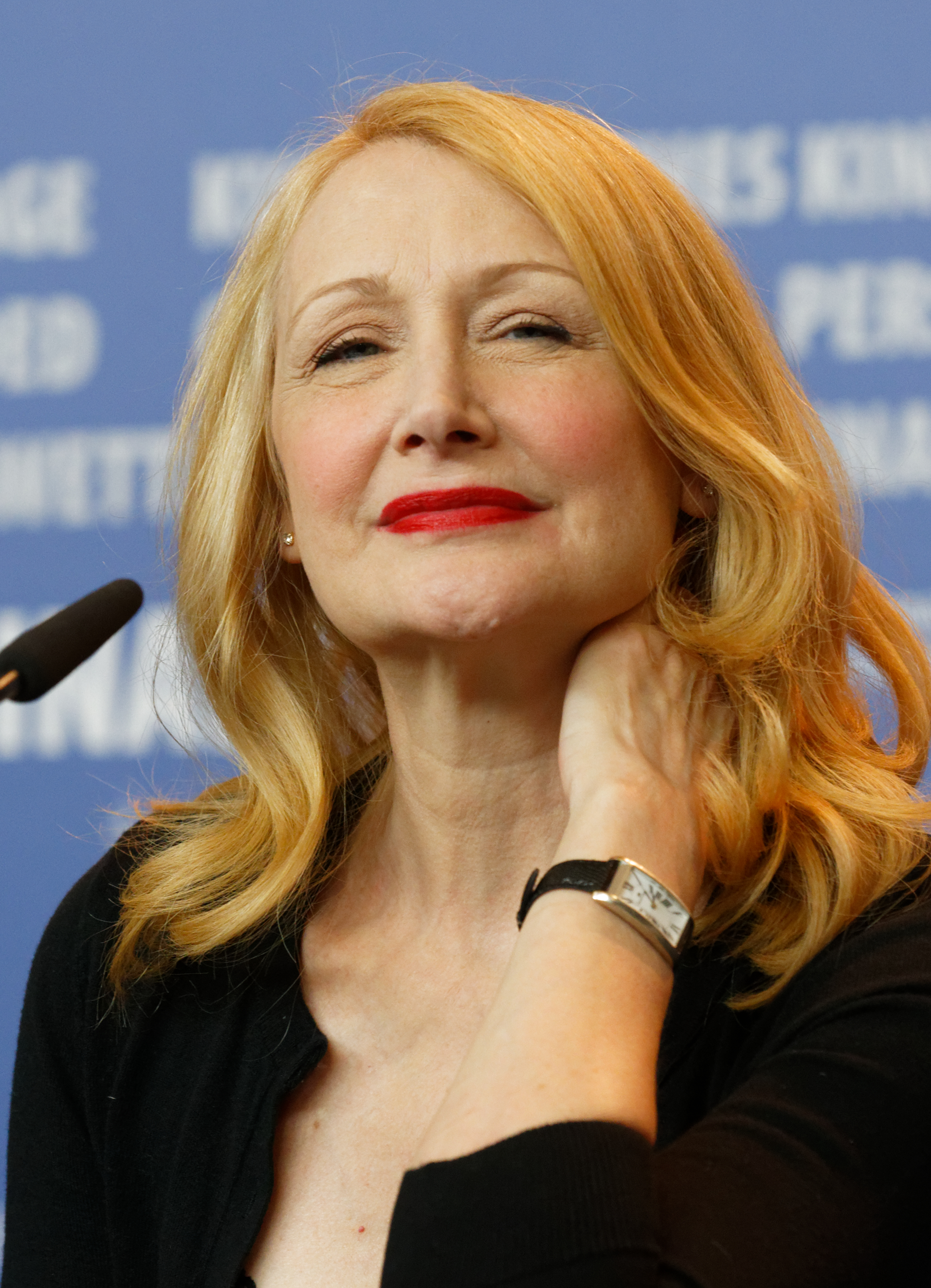
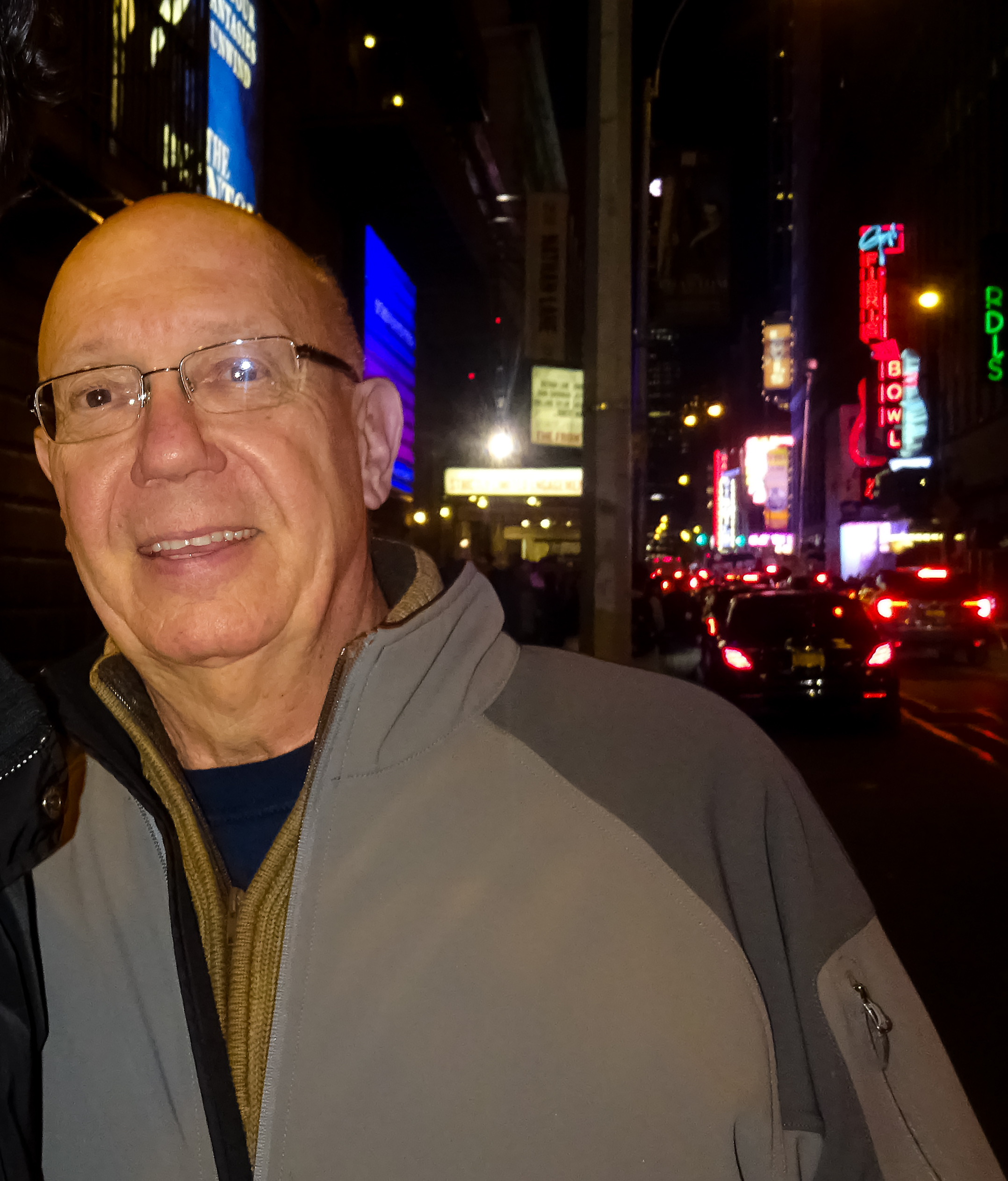
Clarkson – Shalhoub
Florek – Eisenberg
- Richard Hamilton as Otis Hendricks, a saxophonist in the wedding reception band.
- Phyllis Newman as Gwen Hunter, a chatty hostage friendly with everyone, including terrorists.
- Sam Schacht as Frank Stevens, a City Councilman who wants to fight back against the terrorists.
- Ned Eisenberg as an unnamed Terrorist, who tends to distraction, conversing with hostages.
- Tony Spiridakis as an unnamed Terrorist, a coarse thug, in particular towards Deborah Wade.
- Earl Hindman as Findlay, presumably law enforcement, but neither his rank, nor his agency or department is mentioned.
- Dann Florek as Lieutenant Ferraro, who acts as the negotiator.
- Jeff McCarthy as Gary Speer, a hostage with which McCall trade places.
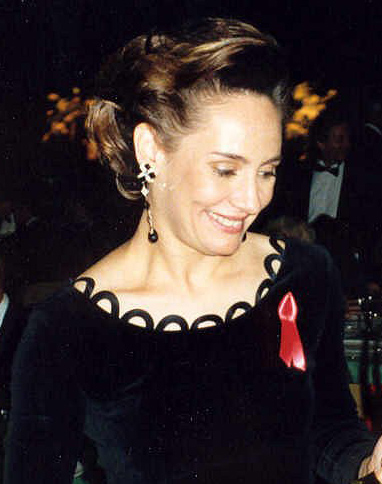
Metcalf
- Laurie Metcalf as Theresa, whose friend Vicki is killed after running afoul of industrial spies.
- D. W. Moffett as Mitchell, a womanizer who inadvertently makes himself a target of Vicki's enemies, after she gives him her phone number.
- Linda Thorson an unnamed Industrial Spy, who wants what Vicki stole; what she now believes Mitchell has.
- Madison Arnold as Mr. Signorello, a cabbie who McCall helps and then recruits to report Laurie's movements.
- Kelly Curtis co-stars as Laurie's friend Vicki who initially passed the information to Mitchell.
- Karen Morris Gowdy as Mary, one of Mitchell's many conquests.
- Lara Harris as a Blonde on Phone, who is mistaken for Vicki.
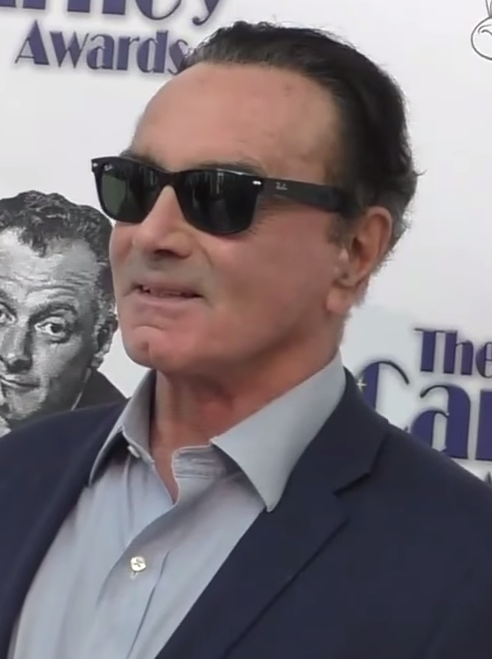
Hedaya
- Dan Hedaya as Frank Donahue, inventor of the Donahue Fuel Injector who claims IP theft.
- Regina Baff as Susan Donahue, Frank's wife, who loses patience with Frank's battle for his invention, and is considering leaving him.
- John Cameron Mitchell as Ed Donahue, Frank's eldest son who sides with his mother.
- John Cullum as Stuart Cane, the ruthless CEO of Penatrax, who has a dark secret and unpunished crimes.
- Jon Polito as Gianni Greco, who led a terrorist organization called Red Wind.
- Lee Wallace as Whitney, who works for Cane, but tries to protect corporate interests.
- Clifford David as Charles Webber, a CEO who Greco uses to trick Cane to uncover his crimes.
- Walter Bobbie as George Cox, a CEO who Greco uses to trick Cane to uncover his crimes.
- August Schellenberg as Brennan, who works for Cane.
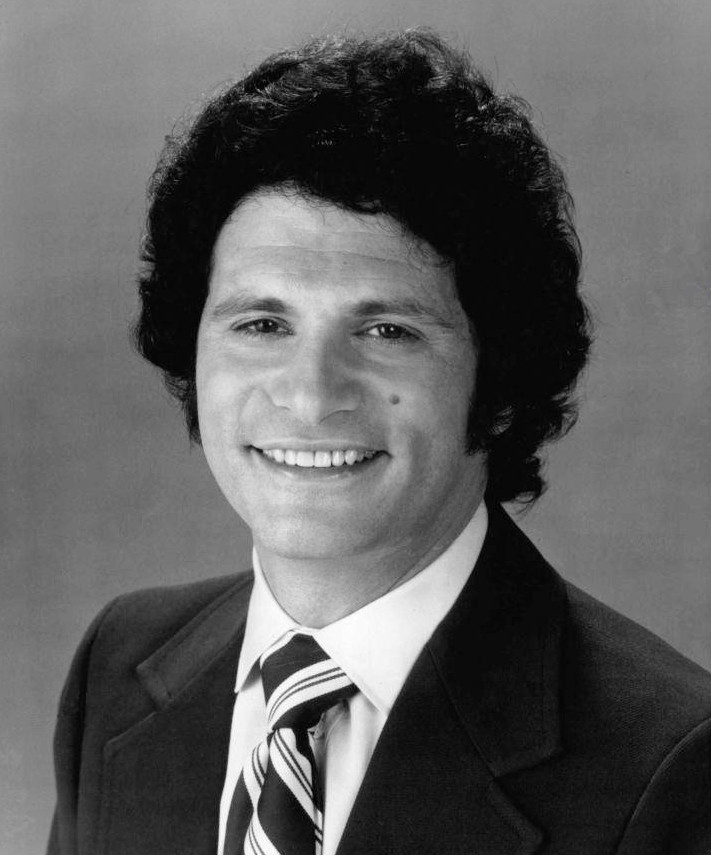
Musante
- Chad Redding as Beth Mackie, a rookie reporter struggling for fame and funds to fight for custody of her six year-old son. She suspects her neighbor John Parker is a criminal.
- Tony Musante as John Parker (an alias), who threatens Beth after she witnesses something nefarious.
- Philip Bosco as Brian Barclay, Beth's editor who doesn't see a story but encourages Beth nevertheless.
- Albert Macklin as Dack, Beth's sympathetic colleague who helps her write about sports, and refers her to The Equalizer.
- Bruce Jarchow as Flynn, Beth's co-worker who will give her pointers, starting with dinner. He once tried to interview The Equalizer.
- Katherine Cortez as Cynthia, Beth's friend, and the one who sublet the apartment to Parker.
- David Bailey as 1st Suit, who with the second guy in a suit, abducts a harried man.
- Ian Buchanan as Harried Man, who Beth witnesses being abducted.
- Grace Garland as Karen, a Company office worker who tries to access Parker's file for McCall.

== Production ==
Episodes were filmed on location in New York City.
