= Ian Edwards (comedian) =

British comedian

- Born: Hammersmith, London, England

Comedy career
- Medium: Stand-up comedy
- Subjects: Observational comedy, dark comedy
- Website: IanEdwardsComedian.com

Ian Edwards is a British-American stand-up comedian, actor, writer and producer based in Los Angeles, California.

== Career ==
Edwards launched his career through stand-up comedy. His first writing job was on The Keenen Ivory Wayans Show in 1998. In 2000, Edwards wrote on MTV's The Lyricist Lounge Show. He wrote on ABC's The Big House starring Kevin Hart, and in 2005, Edwards was a regular cast member on season 6 of MTV's Punk’d, and a story editor on Cartoon Network's The Boondocks. He was a writer on Comedy Central's Chocolate News, a Consulting Producer on Dogg After Dark starring Snoop Dogg and wrote on FOX's In the Flow with Affion Crockett. Edwards performed stand-up on the Comedy Death-Ray album in 2006, appeared twice on HBO's Def Comedy Jam. He performed on P. Diddy's The Bad Boys of Comedy in 2007 and Showtime's Live Nude Comedy in 2009.

Edwards was a writer on ABC's Black-ish, an uncredited writer on CBS's 2 Broke Girls and NBC's The Carmichael Show. Additionally, Edwards was a writer and supervising producer on season 2 of the Adult Swim animated series Black Dynamite. Edwards also wrote jokes featured in The New York Post and Time Out Los Angeles in 2014.

In 2014, Edwards released his debut comedy album, 100% Half Assed on Conan O’Brien's Team Coco Records as the first comic signed to Conan O’Brien's label. He has appeared multiple times on Conan and @Midnight.

Edwards was a cast member in the Jeff Garlin feature Dealin' with Idiots opposite JB Smoove in 2013. In 2014, Edwards acted in the film Tangerine, which was a massive success at Sundance 2015. The film signed a distribution deal with Magnolia Pictures and released in theaters in 2015. In 2015, Edwards starred in Raise The ToyGantic, a mockumentary comedy about the "ToyGantic", a toy luxury ocean-liner built in 1962.

Edwards has been interviewed or reviewed in Entertainment Weekly, The New York Times Magazine, Huffington Post, Paste Magazine, Marvel Comics, Thought Catalogue, The Onion AV Club, LA Weekly, Penthouse Magazine, Uptown Magazine, Exlaim!, and the Joe Rogan Experience.

== Radio and podcasts ==
Edwards is a regular guest on the Joe Rogan Experience podcast, The Adam Carolla Show and the Deathsquad Podcast Network. Edwards has also appeared on Bobby Lee's TigerBelly Podcast, Marc Maron's WTF Podcast, Neal Brennan and Moshe Kasher's The Champs, Joey Diaz's The Church of What's Happening Now, Pete Holmes' You Made It Weird, Duncan Trussell's Duncan Trussell Family Hour, Greg Fitzsimmons's Fitzdog Radio, KROQ's Kevin and Bean Show, the Sway Morning Show and NPR's Bullseye with Jesse Thorn. Edwards also hosts two podcasts: Soccer Comic Rant on AllThingsComedy.com, partnered with Laughspin.com, and co-hosts The Preposterous Sessions with Zara Mizrahi.

== Personal life ==
Edwards is a supporter of English football club Manchester United F.C.

== Filmography ==
- The Uptown Comedy Club
- The Apollo Comedy Hour
- Man of the Century
- Book of Love: The Definitive Reason Why Men Are Dogs
- Natural Born Komics
- The Right Now! Show
- My Two Worlds
- Russell Simmons Presents: The Ruckus
- Going Very Badly
- Raise The ToyGantic
- Tangerine
- Absolutely Jason Stuart
- @midnight
- Friends from College
