= Grace Garland =

- Origin: New York City, US
- Genres: R&B
- Occupation(s): Singer-songwriter, actress
- Years active: 1980–present (Solo)
- Labels: Shark Meat Records
- Website: http://www.gracegarland.com

Grace Garland (born in New York City) is an American singer-songwriter and actress.

== Career ==
On television, Garland rose to fame in the early 1980s playing Vera Vanderbilt on the series All My Children. In 1986, she appeared on The Equalizer as Karen, who works for the Agency and helps Robert McCall gather intelligence, in the episode "Pretenders." She also made a guest appearance on The Cosby Show (1992) playing Maxine. She later went on to become a series regular on The Apollo Comedy Hour (1993–1995) TV series filmed at the famous Harlem Apollo Theater.

Garland has played a number of notable film roles, including Q's (Omar Epps) mother in Juice (1992), and Dr. Love in 30 Years to Life.

On stage, she was an original cast member in the off-Broadway hit musical The Last Session, playing Diva, and appears on the Original Cast Recording as this role.

Garland released a solo album titled Lovers Never Lie (In Bed) (2005) and penned her first book titled Loneliness Makes You Stupid! – The Grown Woman's Dating Guide (Part 1) (2006).

== Discography ==
=== Albums ===
1. Lovers Never Lie (In Bed) (2005)
2. Lady G! (2016)

=== Singles ===
- "Single Mingle Jingle" (2006)
- "I'll Cry Later" (2016), A Global Music Award Winner, Silver Medal – Female Jazz Vocals
