= The Apollo Comedy Hour =

Syndication television show

- Genre: Sketch comedy; Stand-up comedy; Variety
- Directed by: Moses Edinborough; Mark Warren
- Starring: Derrick Fox; Kent Jackman; Yusuf Lamont; Kool Bubba Ice; Randl Ask (1992-1994); Lisa Nicole Carson (1992-1993); Paula Jai Parker (1992-1993); Grace Garland (1993-1995); Michael Mabern (1993-1995); Deborah Magdalena (1993-1994); Ronda Fowler (1994-1995); Ilan Kwittken (1994-1995); Karen June Sanchez (1994-1995)
- Country of origin: United States
- Original language: English
- No. of seasons: 3
- No. of episodes: 78

Production
- Executive producer: Moses Edinborough
- Producer: Ben Hill
- Camera setup: Multi-camera
- Running time: 60
- Production company: Apollo Theatre Productions

Original release
- Network: Syndication
- Release: September 27, 1992 – January 1, 1995

Related
- It's Showtime at the Apollo

The Apollo Comedy Hour is a sketch-comedy that aired in first-run syndication from 1992-1995. The series was filmed the legendary Apollo Theater in Harlem, New York. It was produced by the same people who produced It's Showtime at the Apollo.

== Format ==
Like a similar syndicated show from around the same time period, Uptown Comedy Club and the Fox series In Living Color, Apollo Comedy Hour featured a cast of young hopeful comedians, guest stars and a new musical act for each episode.

== Cast ==
The cast was primarily black and Hispanic, with sketches primarily written around their personal experiences and observations. Series regulars included Paula Jai Parker, Grace Garland, Lisa Nicole Carson, Debra Wilson, and Ian Edwards. Randl Ask and later Ilan Kwittken were the only white cast members. The show was hosted by Phyllis Stickney. Mary Flowers served as music talent executive.

Meanwhile, Patrice O'Neal's first television appearance was on The Apollo Comedy Hour. Other performers featured included Derrick Fox, Yusuf Lamont, Kool Bubba Ice, Gil T, A.G. White, Deirdre Boddie-Henderson, Mike Yard, John Henton, Charles Walden, Damon Rozier, Freddie Ricks, Darryl Littleton, Daran Howard, Tony Woods, and Alonzo Bodden.

== Stations ==
City	Station
Atlanta	WGNX 46
Baltimore	WMAR 2
Boston	WLVI 56
Chicago	WGN 9
Cincinnati	WKRC 12
Cleveland	WJW 8
Colorado Springs	KXRM 21
Denver	KWGN 2
Derry	WNDS 50
Detroit	WJBK 2
Dothan	WTVY 4
Eugene	KEVU 34
Fayetteville	WKFT 40
Lakeland	WTMV 32
Lansing	WLAJ 53
Little Rock	KASN 38
Los Angeles	KTLA 5
Meridian	WTOK 11
Miami	WBFS 33
Milwaukee	WITI 6
Orlando	WFTV 9
Panama City	WJHG 7
Philadelphia	WPHL 17
Salt Lake City	KOOG 30
San Diego	KUSI 51
Seattle	KTZZ 22
Spokane	KAYU 28
Washington, D.C.	WJLA 7
West Palm Beach	WTVX 34
Yakima	K53CY 53
