= Eddie Brill =

American comedian, writer, and actor

- Born: New York, New York
- Notable work: Late Show with David Letterman, Creative Director of The Great American Comedy Festival, Humor consultant of Reader's Digest

Comedy career
- Medium: Stand-up, television, film
- Genres: Satire, observational comedy, Improvisational comedy, sarcasm
- Subjects: Education, religion, American politics, commercialism, health, everyday life, family
- Website: eddiebrill.com

Eddie Brill is an American comedian, writer, and actor who started his career in Boston. He was previously the warm-up comedian and comedy talent coordinator of Late Show with David Letterman. Brill tours frequently, performing in the U.S. as well as in England, Ireland, France, Australia, Amsterdam, and Hong Kong. At one time, he was a humor consultant for Reader's Digest.

== Career ==
Eddie Brill was born in New York City and grew up in Hollywood, Florida.

He attended Emerson College in Boston where he founded the Emerson Comedy Workshop along with Denis Leary, Chris Phillips and Adam Roth. He helped to create the first comedy writing department in a college, along with fellow alumni Norman Lear in 1978. He also began performing standup while in college. He stopped after college in 1980 and then picked it back up in July 1984 when he opened a comedy club in NYC named The Paper Moon. Brill has been working internationally as a comedian since 1989 and has appeared on over 100 TV shows in six countries. He also worked for the Late Show with David Letterman from February 1997 through February 2014 as the audience warm-up comedian and in March 2001 he became the talent coordinator for the stand-up comedians. He is also the creative director of The Great American Comedy Festival in Norfolk, Nebraska which honors Johnny Carson.

In 2012, Brill was removed from his position as the stand-up comedy booker for The Late Show for giving an interview with The New York Times without the show's permission. He was quoted as saying “There are a lot less female comics who are authentic. I see a lot of female comics who, to please an audience, will act like men."
