= McBrayer =

McBrayer is a surname. Notable people with the surname include:

- Jack McBrayer (born 1973), American actor and comedian
- Jody McBrayer (born 1970), American singer/songwriter
- Paul McBrayer (1909-1999), American basketball player
- Staley T. McBrayer (1909-2002), American newspaper publisher
- Terry McBrayer (1937–2020), American lobbyist, attorney, and former politician in Lexington, Kentucky
- Trey McBrayer (born 1994), American wrestler
- W. David McBrayer (born 1950), American film and television producer, writer and entrepreneur

== See also ==
- McBrayer Arena, in the Alumni Coliseum, multi-purpose arena in Richmond, Kentucky, United States
- McBrayer, Kentucky, United States
- James McBryer, Scottish footballer
