= List of The Facts of Life episodes =

The following is a list of episodes for The Facts of Life, which ran for nine seasons from 1979 to 1988 on NBC. There were 201 regular episodes and three television movies (Paris, Down Under, Reunion). Two of the movies, Paris and Down Under, were originally broadcast as TV movies, but in syndication, they were split into four 30-minute episodes, bringing the total number of syndicated episodes to 209.

== Series overview ==
Season	Episodes	Originally released	
Season	Episodes	First released	Last released
Pilot		May 4, 1979	
1	13	August 24, 1979	June 11, 1980
2	16	November 19, 1980	March 25, 1981
3	24	October 28, 1981	May 5, 1982
4	24 + movie	September 25, 1982	May 4, 1983
5	26	September 21, 1983	May 9, 1984
6	26	September 26, 1984	May 15, 1985
7	24	September 14, 1985	May 10, 1986
8	24 + movie	September 27, 1986	May 9, 1987
9	24	September 26, 1987	May 7, 1988
Reunion		November 18, 2001	

== Episodes ==
=== Pilot (1979) ===
The Diff'rent Strokes season 1 finale served as the backdoor pilot for The Facts of Life.

The Facts of Life, season 1 episodes
No. overall	No. in season	Title	Directed by	Written by	Original release date	Prod. code
24	24	"The Girls School" "Garrett's Girls"	Herbert Kenwith	Story by : Dick Clair & Jenna McMahon and Howard Leeds & Ben Starr; Teleplay by : Howard Leeds & Ben Starr	May 4, 1979	122
Mrs. Garrett helps out the girls of the chaotic dormitory at Eastland.

=== Season 1 (1979–80) ===
The first season begins with ten main characters: housemother Edna Garrett (Charlotte Rae), headmaster Steven Bradley (John Lawlor), teacher Emily Mahoney (Jenny O'Hara), and seven students: Blair Warner (Lisa Whelchel), Cindy Webster (Julie Anne Haddock), Molly Parker (Molly Ringwald), Nancy Olsen (Felice Schachter), Natalie Green (Mindy Cohn), Sue Ann Weaver (Julie Piekarski), and Tootie Ramsey (Kim Fields). O'Hara's character was dropped after the fourth episode.

Though counted as a single season, the show aired in discrete blocks of episodes. The show aired four weekly episodes on Wednesday nights in August and September, technically before the 1979/80 TV season actually began. Then the show was off the air for six months, returning in March through early May for a run of seven episodes. (The initial episode was a special presentation on Wednesday night after Diff'rent Strokes; the show then moved to Fridays.) After a month off, the series moved back to Wednesday nights for the season's two final episodes in June.

The Facts of Life, season 1 episodes
No. overall	No. in season	Title	Directed by	Written by	Original release date	Prod. code
1	1	"Rough Housing"	Nick Havinga	Teleplay by : Brad Rider; Story by : Brad Rider & Glenn Padnick	August 24, 1979	101
Blair thinks she is a shoe-in for Harvest Queen and is upset when tomboy Cindy gets nominated, leading to speculation about Cindy’s sexuality. Mrs. Garrett gets a visit from the Drummond family. Note: This was the show's first episode, but is not the pilot. The cast of Diff'rent Strokes guest star only for this episode. The actual pilot episode, used to sell the show to NBC, was the Diff'rent Strokes first season finale, "The Girls' School (aka) Garrett's Girls". This episode features the first two verses of the season's theme.
2	2	"Like Mother, Like Daughter"	Jim Drake	Jerry Mayer	August 31, 1979	102
The girls dream up a Parisian theme for Parents’ Night. Blair’s mother makes quite an impression on male visitors, particularly a married one. Blair worries about being perceived as “easy”. Notes: This episode features the third and final verse of the season's theme. Pam Huntington played Monica Warner (Blair's mother) in this episode only. In 1981, as the show airs its third season, Marj Dusay replaces Huntington in a recurring role as Monica.
3	3	"The Return of Mr. Garrett"	Jim Drake	Martin A. Ragaway	September 7, 1979	103
Mrs. Garrett’s ex-husband (Robert Alda) comes to visit and tries to rekindle their relationship, which Mrs. Garrett considers. Meanwhile, he gets the girls hooked on cards, but Mr. Bradley wants them to focus on their studies.
4	4	"I.Q."	Jim Drake	Jane Gould & Shelly Landau	September 14, 1979	104
Tootie peeks at a list of IQ scores which rattles Sue Ann (who got the lowest score) and Nancy (who got the highest). Mrs. Garrett ends up in a battle of smarts with Mr. Bradley. Note: Jenny O'Hara makes her final appearance on the show and as a main cast regular. After this episode, the show was put on a six-month hiatus.
5	5	"Overachieving"	Lee Lochhead	Jerry Mayer	March 12, 1980	105
Tootie's father (Robert Hooks) thinks Mrs. Garrett's influence over his daughter is holding her back as Tootie has aspired to open a beauty salon. The rest of the girls contemplate their futures with career day looming. Note: After a six-month absence, the series was essentially relaunched. To help the show gain an audience, this episode was immediately preceded by an episode of Diff'rent Strokes ("The Slumber Party") that featured several of the student characters who would be featured on The Facts of Life. Jenny O'Hara has left the show.
6	6	"Emily Dickinson"	Lee Lochhead	Stan Dreben	March 14, 1980	106
Blair plagiarizes an Emily Dickinson poem about beauty, but must come clean when Mr. Bradley submits the poem to a competition and it wins third prize.
7	7	"Dieting"	John Bowab	Martin A. Ragaway	March 21, 1980	108
Blair sets Sue Ann up on a date, which leads her to go on a crash diet. Mrs. Garrett gets caught up in the diet craze when she realizes her new dress is up a size from her usual.
8	8	"The Facts of Love"	John Bowab	Rowland Barber & Jerry Mayer	April 4, 1980	111
To Mr. Bradley's chagrin, Mrs. Garrett holds a sex education class. Blair and Sue Ann have different ideas about physicality in a relationship, and Blair considers experimenting with her boyfriend.
9	9	"Flash Flood"	John Bowab	Jerry Mayer	April 11, 1980	112
Blair and Tootie get stranded at the stable during a storm. Mr. Bradley comes to their rescue, and Blair sees him in a new light. Meanwhile, Nancy frets that Roger can’t get to her, and Molly keeps up with the news on the radio.
10	10	"Adoption"	John Bowab	Migdia Chinea Varela	April 25, 1980	109
The girls get an assignment to make a family tree, and Natalie reveals that she is adopted. Blair tries to help her find her birth mother, but Nancy ties up the phone line with calls to Roger.
11	11	"Running"	John Bowab	Warren Murray	May 2, 1980	110
Sue Ann would rather coach Cindy than take her own place on the track team until her record is threatened. Molly experiments with her new camera and all the girls are willing models. Note: This is the final episode to air on a Friday night. NBC moved the series to Wednesday nights for the final two episodes of the season and during the retooling for the second season.
12	12	"Molly's Holiday"	Gary Shimokawa	Story by : Albert Lewin & Skip Usen; Teleplay by : Albert Lewin	June 4, 1980	107
Molly’s parents are getting divorced, and she hatches a scheme to get them back together. Mr. Bradley takes off for Club Med without a second thought about the girls’ issues.
13	13	"Dope"	John Bowab	Jerry Mayer	June 11, 1980	113
Sue Ann and Blair get in with a new group, but find themselves in over their heads when they realize their new friends smoke pot. Molly, Cindy, and Mrs. Garrett try to set up a new stereo. (Note: Last episode to feature Mr. Steven Bradley, Molly Parker, Sue Ann Weaver, Cindy Webster and Nancy Olson as main cast regulars.) Helen Hunt appears in this episode.

=== Season 2 (1980–81) ===
The main cast is reduced to five main characters: Mrs. Edna Garrett (Charlotte Rae), Blair Warner (Lisa Whelchel), Natalie Green (Mindy Cohn), Tootie Ramsey (Kim Fields), and new girl Jo Polniaczek (Nancy McKeon).

Two more crossovers with Diff'rent Strokes gave the show a boost in the fall of 1980: Tootie appeared in the Diff'rent Strokes episode "The Bank Job" (Parts 1 and 2) on Nov. 12, 1980, and Arnold from Diff'rent Strokes appeared in "The New Girl" (Part 1), the Facts of Life season premiere.

There would be two additional crossovers this season in the winter of 1981: Blair and Natalie appeared in the Diff'rent Strokes episode "The Older Man," and Willis from Diff'rent Strokes appeared in the Facts of Life episode "Bought and Sold."

The Facts of Life, season 2 episodes
No. overall	No. in season	Title	Directed by	Written by	Original release date	Prod. code
14	1	"The New Girl: Part 1"	Bob Claver	Jerry Mayer	November 19, 1980	201
Blair struggles to bond with new girl Jo Polniaczek (Nancy McKeon), after Mrs. Garrett sets them up as roommates. Natalie and Tootie tag along when they head to a bar in a borrowed van with fake IDs, and soon they all end up in trouble when the guy they are talking to turns out to be an undercover cop. Meanwhile, Mrs. Garrett has a visit with Arnold Jackson (Gary Coleman), who has designs on Tootie. Notes: Nancy McKeon becomes a main cast member as Jo Polniaczek in the series. John Lawlor, Felice Schachter, Julie Anne Haddock, Julie Piekarski, and Molly Ringwald are no longer series regulars. Schachter, Haddock and Piekarski become recurring characters in seasons 2 and 3. Ringwald makes a guest character appearance in the next episode, which became her fourteenth and final episode. Eastland is the backdrop of the first scene of the opening titles from the second season premiere to the third episode of season five.
15	2	"The New Girl: Part 2"	Bob Claver	Jack Elinson	November 26, 1980	202
The girls are put on probation by the headmaster Mr. Harris after their arrest and Mrs. Garrett takes custody of them as they work off the damage to the school van in the cafeteria. Blair tries to help Jo when another student bullies her about her background. (Note: Molly Parker (Molly Ringwald) makes a return appearance in this episode, but it is her last in the series.)
16	3	"Double Standard"	Asaad Kelada	Linda Marsh & Margie Peters	December 10, 1980	204
Blair’s childhood friend invites Jo to a cotillion, but it isn’t dancing he has in mind. Natalie, Tootie, and Mrs. Garrett get competitive playing a game of Scrabble.
17	4	"Who Am I?"	Lee Lochhead	Linda Marsh & Margie Peters	December 17, 1980	205
Tootie meets a Black teen who makes her think more deeply about her identity as a person of color. Meanwhile, everyone gets ready for the annual dance contest, and Tootie designs a new dress for Blair.
18	5	"Cousin Geri"	Asaad Kelada	Ann Gibbs & Joel Kimmel	December 24, 1980	206
Blair's cousin Geri (Geri Jewell), a comedian who has cerebral palsy, visits. Blair is up for an award and struggles with Geri’s presence at her special dinner. This episode marks Jewell's first appearance in the series.
19	6	"Shoplifting"	Lee Lochhead	Sally Sussman	December 31, 1980	203
Jo, Tootie, and Natalie struggle to buy a birthday gift for Mrs. Garrett that will compete with Blair’s gift, and Jo ultimately resorts to desperate measures.
20	7	"Teenage Marriage: Part 1"	John Bowab	Jerry Mayer	January 7, 1981	207
Jo’s boyfriend Eddie, AWOL from the Navy, surprises her with a marriage proposal. Blair uses her influence on the debating team to dissuade Jo from accepting.
21	8	"Teenage Marriage: Part 2"	John Bowab	Jerry Mayer	January 14, 1981	208
Mrs. Garrett and the girls try to stall Jo with a bridal shower until her mom can arrive. Jo and Eddie start to realize they have different visions of their future together.
22	9	"Gossip"	Lee Lochhead	Paul L. Friedman & Gayle MacDonald	January 21, 1981	209
Upset that she is excluded from a field trip, Tootie uses gossip to get in with the older girls. This leads to fights between Nancy, Blair, and Jo, not to mention a rumor that Mrs. Garrett has a drinking problem that causes her to be confronted by Mr. Harris (Kenneth Mars). (Note: Felice Schacter, Julie Piekarski and Julie Ann Haddock make return guest appearances as Nancy, Sue Ann, and Cindy, respectively.)
23	10	"Breaking Point"	John Bowab	Linda Marsh & Margie Peters	January 28, 1981	210
Blair feels like the world is ending when she loses the student council president race against Cynthia (Denise Halma) and she falls into a depression. However, all the girls struggle after Cynthia resorts to drastic action when Tootie and Natalie found her motionless in her room next to an empty bottle of pills. Natalie went to fetch the school nurse. Mrs. Garrett hears about what happened from Tootie and instructs Blair to call the ambulance while Jo and Tootie fetch Mr. Harris. Sometime later, Mrs. Garrett receives a call stating that Cynthia's dead. Following Cynthia's suicide, upon going through Cynthia's stuff, Mrs. Garrett and the girls learned that her parents are going through a bitter divorce which put a lot of pressure on her.
24	11	"Sex Symbol"	John Bowab	Teleplay by : Linda Marsh & Margie Peters and Ann Gibbs & Joel Kimmel and Sally Sussman; Story by : Sally Sussman	February 4, 1981	211
A boy Natalie studies with starts spreading lies about what happened between them. When the other girls insinuate that Natalie could never be the kind of girl the boy says she is, she starts to embrace the attention.
25	12	"The Secret"	John Bowab	Story by : Jerry Mayer & Robyn Knapton; Teleplay by : Jerry Mayer	February 25, 1981	212
Tootie accidentally opens a letter from Jo’s dad that reveals a truth about him that no one else knows. Jo then visits her dad in prison and finds out he will be released in time to attend an award ceremony.
26	13	"Pretty Babies"	Bob Claver	Ann Gibbs & Joel Kimmel	March 4, 1981	214
A photographer comes to Eastland to find a new muse and surprises everyone (especially Blair) by choosing Tootie. Mrs. Garrett is concerned that the photographer is making Tootie too mature. (Note: Felice Schacter makes a returning guest appearance as Nancy Olson.)
27	14	"Bought and Sold"	John Bowab	Teleplay by : Linda Marsh & Margie Peters; Story by : Linda Marsh & Margie Peters and Susan Haven & Philip Ross	March 11, 1981	213
Blair sells cosmetics by Countess Calvert and gives Natalie an expensive makeover, which changes Natalie’s priorities and causes tension among the girls. Mrs. Garrett has a visit from Willis. Todd Bridges appears as Willis, and Zsa Zsa Gabor also guest stars.
28	15	"Free Spirit"	Bob Claver	Ann Gibbs & Joel Kimmel	March 18, 1981	215
Mrs. Garrett’s son Alex inspires Natalie with his free-wheeling life, but Blair thinks he is exaggerating his adventures. Meanwhile Natalie’s schoolwork falls to the side as she gets more and more distracted.
29	16	"Brian and Sylvia"	John Bowab	Jack Elinson	March 25, 1981	216
Tootie and Natalie go to Buffalo to visit Tootie's uncle Brian (Richard Dean Anderson) and aunt Sylvia (Rosanne Katon), who are an interracial couple. Sylvia, a local news anchor, has received a job offer in New York City, but Brian does not want to move.

=== Season 3 (1981–82) ===
Mr. Parker (Roger Perry) is a recurring character as the school's new headmaster. Linda Marsh and Margie Peters join Jerry Mayer as producers. Jack Elison and Jerry Mayer were the executive producers.

The Facts of Life, season 3 episodes
No. overall	No. in season	Title	Directed by	Written by	Original release date	Prod. code
30	1	"Growing Pains"	Asaad Kelada	Linda Marsh & Margie Peters	October 28, 1981	302
Tootie takes her job as dorm monitor very seriously much to the annoyance of the other girls, who sneak wine and beer into their room. Mrs. Garrett tries to get money for new kitchen equipment. (Note: Roger Perry appears as Eastland's new headmaster, Charles Parker.) Note: Starting this season, Kim Fields began wearing braces.
31	2	"Fear Strikes Back"	Asaad Kelada	Deidre Fay & Stuart Wolpert	November 4, 1981	306
Natalie gets assaulted on the way home from a party and struggles to move past it. Jo and Blair battle over Halloween costumes, and eventually all the girls take a self-defense class.
32	3	"A Baby in the House"	Asaad Kelada	Story by : Jerry Winnick; Teleplay by : Stuart Wolpert & Deidre Fay and Jerry Winnick	November 11, 1981	308
A former student who has a baby comes back for a visit and leaves without something important. Blair tries to convince Jo to join her on a double date while Natalie struggles to find time to study.
33	4	"A Friend in Deed"	Asaad Kelada	Linda Marsh & Margie Peters	November 18, 1981	307
Blair’s mom comes for a visit and it is revealed that her plastic surgery is for something much more serious. Her cousin Geri needs to update her comedy act. Meanwhile, Jo stresses about a job interview. Note: This is Marj Dusay's first episode playing Monica Warner.
34	5	"Front Page"	Asaad Kelada	Mike Mayer & Larry Swimer	November 25, 1981	309
Jo writes a story for the school newspaper that gets a teacher in trouble but she may not have all her facts straight. As the editor, Natalie struggles with the decision to print it. (Note: Julie Piekarski and Julie Ann Haddock make their final guest appearances (until season 8) as Sue Ann Weaver and Cindy Webster.)
35	6	"Give and Take"	Asaad Kelada	Linda Marsh & Margie Peters	December 2, 1981	303
Mrs. Garrett has a financial crisis and takes another job. The girls are oblivious to her plight thanks to their own problems, especially Blair who needs helping planning an art club luncheon.
36	7	"Sweet Sorrow"	Asaad Kelada	Linda Marsh & Margie Peters	December 9, 1981	310
Jo is surprised when she feels she has to choose between her class project partner and her boyfriend Eddie. Blair isn’t quite as enamored with her assigned partner.
37	8	"From Russia with Love"	Asaad Kelada	Story by : Jerry Mayer & Emily Mayer; Teleplay by : Jerry Mayer	December 16, 1981	301
Blair and Tootie prepare for a ski trip. Natalie’s doting grandma Mona (Molly Picon) visits, and Natalie is annoyed that she has to cancel a date. The other girls, however, are fascinated with Mona’s stories.
38	9	"Dear Me"	Asaad Kelada	Lloyd Turner & Howard Liebling	December 23, 1981	311
The girls plan a camping trip with a group of Bates boys and try to set Tootie up with a date for the occasion. Tootie creates a fake boyfriend so that she doesn’t have to go along. (Note: Felice Schacter guest-stars as Nancy Olson.)
39	10	"Cousin Geri Returns"	Asaad Kelada	Ann Gibbs & Joel Kimmel	December 30, 1981	305
Blair hosts a big, important party, but worries when someone shows interest in her cousin Geri. The rest of the girls get caught up in Geri’s fantasy romance with the handsome French teacher.
40	11	"Legacy"	Judi Elterman	Deidre Fay & Stuart Wolpert	January 6, 1982	312
Natalie writes a newspaper article on Blair’s grandfather and discovers ties to racist organizations just as his money is about to be used for a new library. Blair starts treating Tootie differently after finding out.
41	12	"Green-Eyed Monster"	Asaad Kelada	Story by : Bill Shinkai; Teleplay by : Linda Marsh & Margie Peters	January 13, 1982	313
Natalie is dying for the lead role in “South Pacific”. Tootie casually wins it, causing tension between the friends. Meanwhile Blair focuses on set design and laments that no one appreciates her vision. (Note: Final guest appearance (until season 8) by Felice Schachter as Nancy Olson.)
42	13	"The Americanization of Miko"	Asaad Kelada	Stephen W. Spears & Bill Shinkai	January 20, 1982	314
Miko (Lauren Tom), a Japanese student with a very strict and traditional father (Mako), tries to explore more fun and laid-back things including learning how to ride Jo’s motorcycle.
43	14	"The Marriage Brokers"	Alejandro Rey	Mitch Markowitz	January 27, 1982	315
Mrs. Garrett has a handsome visitor (Norman Alden) and the girls are shocked to realize the nature of the relationship. Blair dates a family friend out of obligation but finds he is much different than she remembers.
44	15	"Starstruck"	Asaad Kelada	Story by : Marvin Braverman; Teleplay by : Marvin Braverman and Deidre Fay & Stuart Wolpert	February 3, 1982	316
Tootie begs Mrs. Garrett to bring her to a Jermaine Jackson concert, believing that the singer personally invited her. She also forgets about the scholarship fair, leaving Jo in the lurch. Note: Jermaine Jackson appears as himself in this episode.
45	16	"The Four Musketeers"	Asaad Kelada	Deidre Fay & Stuart Wolpert	February 10, 1982	304
When the heat and water in the building go haywire, the girls end up at each other’s throats. Just in time, Mrs. Garrett reveals they can move back into the dorms.
46	17	"The Affair"	Asaad Kelada	Migdia Chinea-Varela	February 17, 1982	318
On a visit to an exclusive NYC restaurant, the girls and Mrs. Garrett spot Natalie’s father (Norman Burton) with another woman. Natalie then becomes upset with Blair because of her dating habits.
47	18	"Runaway"	Asaad Kelada	Bernard Burnell Mack	February 24, 1982	317
Tootie tries to connect with the older girls in NYC and instead connects with a young prostitute (Tammy Lauren) who tries to recruit her. The other girls miss the show they were trying to see and spend the day chasing down Tootie.
48	19	"New York, New York"	Asaad Kelada	Peter Noah	March 3, 1982	319
Blair and Jo visit old friends and realize how much they have each changed. Blair is more independent and less spoiled, while Jo has softened and sees the value in respecting her neighborhood.
49	20	"Kids Can Be Cruel"	Asaad Kelada	Jerry Mayer	March 17, 1982	320
The upperclassmen create dinner boxes to auction off, and Natalie hopes a certain Bates boy bids on hers. Meanwhile, a sweet unsuspecting Bates boy (Dan Frischman) gets caught up in slambook drama. Note: This episode was reenacted for the third edition of Live in Front of a Studio Audience.
50	21	"Mind Your Own Business"	Selig Frank	Jerry Jacobius & Steven Gore	March 24, 1982	321
Mrs. Garrett tries to write a speech for the dietitians convention. Blair reads Natalie’s diary with good intentions but finds out Natalie’s true feelings about her, leading to a set of disastrous privacy rules.
51	22	"The Academy"	Asaad Kelada	Jerry Mayer	March 31, 1982	322
Focus shifts to Jo’s friend and his roommates at their military academy, where they have a big dance coming up. Jo sets Blair up with her friend, without telling her he is a juvenile delinquent.
52	23	"Jo's Cousin"	Asaad Kelada	Linda Marsh & Margie Peters	April 14, 1982	324
Jo gets caught up in family drama while celebrating her cousin Terry’s (Megan Follows) birthday, and even calls in Blair’s help when Terry decides she wants to be more ladylike.
53	24	"Read No Evil"	Dolores Ferraro	Story by : Deidre Fay & Stuart Wolpert and Hendrik Van Leuven; Teleplay by : Deidre Fay & Stuart Wolpert	May 5, 1982	323
Natalie decries the school’s book banning policy and puts her job as editor of the school paper on the line. Meanwhile, Geri gets the girls hooked on soap operas while trying to get material for a new comedy act.

=== Season 4 (1982–83) ===
The Facts of Life, season 4 episodes
No. overall	No. in season	Title	Directed by	Written by	Original release date	Prod. code
--	--	"The Facts of Life Goes to Paris"	Asaad Kelada	Jerry Mayer & Jack Elinson, Linda Marsh & Margie Peters, Deidre Fay & Stuart Wolpert	September 25, 1982	--
Mrs. Garrett attends a prestigious cooking academy in Paris while the girls escape their cultural exchange program and have adventures. Blair soaks in the city and looks for romance, Jo heads for Le Mans and meets a charming biker, and Natalie and Tootie spend time with a struggling writer and try to inspire him. Note: Originally a two-hour movie, is shown in four half-hour episodes in syndication.
54	1	"Ain't Miss Beholden"	Asaad Kelada	Stephen Neigher	September 29, 1982	403
When Jo’s scholarship fund dries up, she decides she would rather take odd jobs and earn the money herself than apply for a scholarship sponsored by Blair’s family business.
55	2	"The Source"	Asaad Kelada	Peter Noah	October 6, 1982	404
Natalie writes a riveting article about abortion for the school paper, but the headmaster threatens to expel her if she doesn’t reveal who the story is really about. Blair especially is dying to know.
56	3	"The Sound of Silence"	Asaad Kelada	Kimberly Hill	October 27, 1982	401
Tootie begins to struggle with her classwork and personal life. Geri has a theory about why, which is related to hearing loss.
57	4	"The Oldest Living Graduate"	Asaad Kelada	John Markus	November 3, 1982	407
Eastland's oldest living graduate, Marie Thornwell (Amzie Strickland), a wealthy eccentric, was all set to donate her fortune to the school, but meeting Jo changes her mind. Note: Margaret Hamilton was originally cast in the role of Marie Thornwell. The TV Guide ad for this episode even featured her picture. An editor's note was added under the encapsulated description which said that Amzie Strickland was her "last minute replacement."
58	5	"Different Drummer"	Asaad Kelada	Dianne Messina & Lou Messina	November 10, 1982	408
Blair thinks she is doing a good deed by tutoring an intellectually disabled young man, but the student misinterprets her good intentions after Blair pushes him too far. Jo struggles to ward off delivery boy Roy's romantic advances.
59	6	"Dearest Mommie"	Asaad Kelada	Deidre Fay & Stuart Wolpert	November 17, 1982	409
Natalie and her mom (Mitzi Hoag) argue about a journalism opportunity, and it leads her to seek out her biological mother. Jo finds her old yo-yo and Blair bets that she can learn all of Jo’s tricks in a week.
60	7	"A Woman's Place"	Asaad Kelada	Story by : David Chambers and Ruth Bennett; Teleplay by : David Chambers	November 24, 1982	410
Jo gets promoted over her boyfriend, causing friction between them. Still she offers to help Blair, who is having trouble with her dad’s Porsche. Meanwhile Natalie gets really into her Psychology class and can’t stop analyzing everyone.
61	8	"Daddy's Girl"	Asaad Kelada	Howard Meyers & Paul Haggis	December 1, 1982	402
Mrs. Garrett takes inventory with the girls’ help, and tries to order healthy food for the school. Blair is a bit too nonchalant when the IRS wants to talk to her about the allowance her father (Nicolas Coster) pays to her.
62	9	"The Big Fight"	Asaad Kelada	Jerry Mayer	December 8, 1982	406
The boys at the academy prepare for a big boxing match. A boy named Alfred asks Natalie to come watch, but he struggles with his matchup against a very tough and intimidating classmate.
63	10	"For the Asking"	Asaad Kelada	Nick Gore & Jerry Jacobius	December 15, 1982	411
Natalie is too stressed to ask the boy (Brian Robbins) she likes to the Sadie Hawkins dance. Blair worries about the optics of a girl asking a guy for a date, while Tootie embraces the opportunity and courts many boys at once.
64	11	"September Song"	Asaad Kelada	Bob Peete	December 22, 1982	405
Mrs. Garrett’s jogging partner Henry (Murray Matheson) expresses interest in creating a future together, but he quickly becomes overbearing. The girls think he is too old for her and resent him when he starts bossing them around.
65	12	"A Royal Pain"	Asaad Kelada	Jerry Mayer	January 5, 1983	413
Alex (portrayed by Heather McAdam), the daughter of the last of the Italian royals, enrolls at Eastland. Blair isn’t as taken with her as the other girls, and Tootie ends up in a tough spot when she catches Alex trying to sneak out with a boy.
66	13	"Magnificent Obsession"	Asaad Kelada	Linda Marsh & Margie Peters	January 12, 1983	412
Blair’s new boyfriend, Chad, is incredibly demanding and doesn’t treat her well. The rest of the girls struggle to get through to her while working on a fundraiser to save the seals, and Jo tries to keep her from taking a call from him.
67	14	"Under Pressure"	Asaad Kelada	Sandra Kay Siegel	January 19, 1983	414
Mrs. Garrett has high blood pressure, and the girls’ efforts to ease her stress have the opposite effect. She ends up with her car stolen, and the one task that she wanted to work on is the one that gets taken away.
68	15	"Teacher's Pet"	Asaad Kelada	Deidre Fay & Stuart Wolpert	January 26, 1983	415
Jo is upset when she learns her favorite teacher (Deborah Harmon) is leaving school, but it’s not what she thinks. Meanwhile, Blair’s cousin Geri is in town to help plan her surprise birthday party.
69	16	"Let's Party"	Asaad Kelada	Jerry Mayer	February 9, 1983	417
Tootie's college-age brother Marshall (Kevin Rodney Sullivan) comes to Peekskill for a visit. After drinking at a party, he insists on driving the girls home and gets into an accident. Jo is a little preoccupied with her garden project.
70	17	"Best Sister: Part 1"	Asaad Kelada	Linda Marsh & Margie Peters	February 16, 1983	418
Blair's stepsister Meg (Eve Plumb) drops surprising news that she’s going to join a convent. Blair struggles to accept her decision. Jo plans to go on a college weekend with an old friend, but spends time with Meg instead.
71	18	"Best Sister: Part 2"	Asaad Kelada	Linda Marsh & Margie Peters	February 23, 1983	419
Jo is incredibly inspired by Meg and wants to follow in her footsteps, but Blair is still in disbelief and it leads to a fight between the friends. Mrs. Garrett tries to help Blair sort out her feelings about faith.
72	19	"Guess Who's Coming to Dinner?"	Asaad Kelada	Deidre Fay & Stuart Wolpert	March 9, 1983	416
Mrs. Garrett hosts a dinner for the cooking instructor from her Paris culinary school, but doesn’t realize his family speaks very little English. The girls try to capture a squirrel that has made its way into their bedroom.
73	20	"Who's on First"	Asaad Kelada	Kimberly Hill	March 30, 1983	420
Natalie has a new boyfriend, and she thinks Tootie wouldn’t understand what it's like to be in love. Tootie feels slighted and starts lying so she can spend more time with Natalie. Jo and Blair get involved in the stock market.
74	21	"Help from Home"	Asaad Kelada	Jerry Mayer	April 6, 1983	421
Blair and Jo anxiously watch college acceptances roll in. Jo’s neighbors in the Bronx are ready to celebrate her, but she gets stuck in her parents’ fights about finances and considers giving up going to college.
75	22	"Take My Finals, Please"	Asaad Kelada	Deidre Fay & Stuart Wolpert	April 27, 1983	422
The girls pull an all-nighter trying to study for exams, but keep getting distracted with nostalgia, gossip, and hunger. Mrs. Garrett tries to persuade them to focus on getting a good night’s sleep.
76	23	"Graduation"	Asaad Kelada	Kimberly Hill and Linda Marsh & Margie Peters	May 4, 1983	423
77	24	"Graduation"	Asaad Kelada	Kimberly Hill and Linda Marsh & Margie Peters	May 4, 1983	424
Part 1: Mrs. Garrett tries to get graduation to run smoothly, but Alex and Roy bring more annoyance than assistance. Tootie is sad about all the changes. Jo stresses out about her valedictorian speech, and Blair gives fellow graduates makeovers. Part 2: Blair’s dad is going to miss graduation, and her mom can’t get over it. Meanwhile Jo is in the middle of her own parents’ arguments. When it is time to give her speech, Jo reminisces about her time at Eastland, and then all the girls struggle to say goodbye.

=== Season 5 (1983–84) ===
Blair and Jo start college, and Mrs. Garrett quits Eastland and opens her own gourmet food shop and catering business. Blair, Jo, Tootie, and Natalie all move in with her. Pamela Segall joins the cast this season, beginning with the episode "Just My Bill". Her final appearance is in the episode "Seems Like Old Times", and her character is dropped following that episode. Blair and Jo have been kicked out of the dorms and placed on probation. Mrs. Garrett offers Jo a place to live and a job in her store. Tootie and Natalie also move into the apartments above the store. Blair is reluctant to move in and decides to pledge a sorority.

The Facts of Life, season 5 episodes
No. overall	No. in season	Title	Directed by	Written by	Original release date	Prod. code
78	1	"Brave New World"	Asaad Kelada	Linda Marsh & Margie Peters	September 21, 1983	501
79	2	"Brave New World"	Asaad Kelada	Linda Marsh & Margie Peters	September 21, 1983	502
Part 1: Jo’s job falls through and it leads to financial struggles which she tries to solve by moving in with Blair. Natalie and Tootie visit Langley and worry about looking young. Mrs. Garrett struggles with Mr. Parker’s demands and then gets a visit from her son, Raymond (Joel Brooks). Part 2: Jo and Blair try to manage things in the tight quarters of Blair’s dorm room. Mrs. Garrett resigns from Eastland and tries to get her store, Edna's Edibles, off the ground, but Natalie and Tootie lament how things are at Eastland since she left. Mrs. Garrett thinks up a solution to everyone’s problems. Note: This is the final episode to feature Eastland Academy as the main setting of the show.
80	3	"Gamma Gamma or Bust"	Asaad Kelada	Story by : George Tricker & Neil Rosen; Teleplay by : George Tricker & Neil Rosen and Andy Borowitz	September 28, 1983	503
Blair decides not to move in above the store and instead tries to rush a sorority, but causes trouble when she asks Mrs. Garrett to cater an event. Tootie, Natalie, and Jo try to mediate the disagreement and end up doing the cooking themselves with disastrous results. Note: Jami Gertz makes the first of four appearances as Blair's sorority sister Boots St. Clair. (Note: "Gamma Gamma or Bust" is the first episode to feature Edna's Edibles as the show's new setting.) Note: This was the last episode of the Eastland backdrop in the opening credits. This was also the last episode showing Mindy Cohn and Nancy McKeon's scenes from the two previous seasons.
81	4	"Just My Bill"	Asaad Kelada	Dianne Messina & Lou Messina	October 12, 1983	505
Jo has a new secret boyfriend. Blair recognizes him as the son of an esteemed millionaire, and it leads to a conflict. Natalie and Tootie are very invested in the outcome of the dates. Note: Edna's Edibles was marked the season's new backdrop at the beginning of the opening credits until the 3rd episode of the show's 7th season. Mindy Cohn and Nancy McKeon were marked new original scenes in the opening credits of this episode. Starting this episode, Pamela Segall joins the on-and-off regular blockage as Kelly Affinado.
82	5	"What Price Glory?"	Asaad Kelada	Alan Spencer	October 19, 1983	506
Blair tries to get her cousin Geri to perform at an Eastland event. Tootie meets a charming customer from Bates, and he asks for her help with a questionable endeavor. Meanwhile everyone struggles to finish inventory. Note: Geri Jewell guest stars as Blair's cousin, comedian 'Geri Tyler'.
83	6	"The Halloween Show"	Asaad Kelada	Jerry Mayer	October 26, 1983	507
On Halloween, a mysterious customer tells the girls scary stories, then never returns to pick up his order, leading them to suspect Mrs. Garrett had something to do with his disappearance. Mrs. Garrett is frustrated that the girls aren’t getting their work done.
84	7	"Advance Placement"	Asaad Kelada	Bob Myer & Bob Young	November 2, 1983	510
Natalie is invited to take a class at Langley and becomes a popular figure on campus, much to Blair and Jo’s annoyance. Tootie is upset that Natalie’s priorities have changed, and Natalie struggles to keep up with her Eastland work. (Note: "Advance Placement" marks Roger Perry's final guest appearance as Mr. Parker.)
85	8	"I'm Dancing as Fast as I Can"	Asaad Kelada	Jim Geoghan	November 9, 1983	509
Blair and Jo bring Mrs. Garrett to a strip club for her birthday, and Blair is shocked when she realizes one of the dancers is her new boyfriend Cliff (Woody Brown). Tootie and Natalie, too young to go, just want all the details.
86	9	"Small But Dangerous"	Asaad Kelada	Andy Borowitz	November 16, 1983	508
The store is vandalized with gang-related graffiti. A young neighborhood girl named Kelly, who Jo once caught shoplifting, turns out to be in the middle of it. Jo vows to handle it herself and finds out Kelly’s surprising motives.
87	10	"Store Games"	Asaad Kelada	Story by : Andy Borowitz and Howard Meyers; Teleplay by : Andy Borowitz	November 30, 1983	512
Another gourmet food shop opens nearby. When Blair goes to scope it out, she is charmed by the seemingly charismatic owner (William Windom) who then starts taking jobs from Mrs. Garrett. Natalie uses her new computer to figure out what else he is taking.
88	11	"The Second Time Around"	Asaad Kelada	Linda Marsh & Margie Peters	December 14, 1983	511
Jo’s divorced parents (Alex Rocco and Claire Malis) come to watch her compete in a motorcycle race, and she schemes to get them back together, but her dad has big news. Natalie drags Tootie on a blind date that turns out to be a disaster.
89	12	"The Christmas Show"	Asaad Kelada	Jerry Mayer	December 21, 1983	515
Tootie and Blair scheme to help Jo get to Miami so she can spend Christmas with her dad. Mrs. Garrett tries to sell holiday fruitcakes. Natalie learns about Christmas traditions, with help from Tootie and a customer, Mr. Lasaroni.
90	13	"The Chain Letter"	Asaad Kelada	Bob Myer & Bob Young	December 28, 1983	504
Mrs. Garrett stresses about the board of health inspection and she is counting on the girls to help. They get distracted by a chain letter and the bad luck that they assume the chain letter brought with it.
91	14	"Next Door"	Linda Day	Milt Rosen & Glenn Padnick	January 4, 1984	513
Tootie befriends a latchkey kid (Taliesin Jaffe) who lives in the building next door with his single mother (Jean Smart). The boiler gives everyone trouble despite Jo’s attempts to repair it, and it is up to Tootie to save the day. Meanwhile, Blair scores tickets to a popular play.
92	15	"Crossing the Line"	Mark W. Travis	Andy Borowitz	January 11, 1984	516
Natalie starts to date Tootie’s cousin and it opens up everyone’s minds about how interracial relationships work. In the midst of her conflicting feelings, Tootie tells an elaborate lie to slow the relationship down.
93	16	"All or Nothing"	Asaad Kelada	Bob Myer & Bob Young	January 18, 1984	518
Jo is elected to the Langley board of regents. She is shocked to find out how the board allocates funds and tries to make changes, but the moment starts to go to her head and she loses sight of the goal.
94	17	"A Death in the Family"	Asaad Kelada	Linda Marsh & Margie Peters	February 1, 1984	519
Mrs. Garrett arranges for the store to have a float in the Founder’s Day parade. Natalie’s dad suddenly passes away, and the girls struggle to understand her way of grieving. Tootie is overwhelmed wanting to help Natalie.
95	18	"Big Fish/Little Fish"	Asaad Kelada	Linda Marsh & Margie Peters	February 8, 1984	520
Natalie continues to struggle with grief. Jo wins the contest the store set up for the queen of the parade float, which makes Blair question everything and Jo doubts her ability to be “popular”. Tootie and Mrs. Garrett wait out in the cold for concert tickets.
96	19	"Star at Langley"	Asaad Kelada	Andy Borowitz	February 15, 1984	521
A famous movie star, Heather Hunt, enrolls at Langley. Blair has been wanting to slow things down with her boyfriend, but she gets suspicious when Heather takes an interest in him. The rest of the girls are just tickled to have her as a customer at Edna’s Edibles.
97	20	"Dream Marriage"	Asaad Kelada	Jerry Mayer	February 22, 1984	522
When Cliff proposes to Blair, she imagines what her life, and the lives of the other girls, might be like in the year 2000. It scares her to realize everyone else is accomplishing great things and they aren’t interested in reminiscing about old times.
98	21	"Mother and Daughter"	Norman Cohen	Jerry Mayer	February 29, 1984	517
Tootie’s lawyer mother (played by Kim Fields' mother Chip) gives a lecture. Jo is inspired and considers a career in law, while Tootie struggles with bad news about an audition and worries that her mom doesn’t understand her. Natalie and Kelly plan a “TP party”, and Blair searches for a punk costume.
99	22	"All by Herself"	Judi Elterman	Story by : Bob Myer & Bob Young and Cheri Eichen & Bill Steinkellner; Teleplay by : Bob Myer & Bob Young	March 14, 1984	514
Geri (Geri Jewell) asks for Blair’s help planning an event, but Blair totally takes over and as a result, Geri doesn’t want any help from anyone. Tootie and Natalie struggle to balance helping Blair, working for Mrs. Garrett, and doing schoolwork. Note: This episode marks Geri Jewell's final appearance.
100	23	"Seems Like Old Times"	Asaad Kelada	Linda Marsh & Margie Peters	March 21, 1984	524
Jo's former boyfriend Eddie (Clark Brandon), comes to town for a visit. Blair is shocked by how cultured he seems, while everyone else is tickled to have him back. Jo tries not to get too attached, but finds out he has a secret. Note: This is Pamela Segall's final appearance in the series.
101	24	"Joint Custody"	Asaad Kelada	Bob Myer & Bob Young	May 2, 1984	523
Mrs. Garrett's son, Raymond (Joel Brooks), who also owns the building where Edna's Edibles is located, visits with his wife Doris (Kim Darby). Their impending separation puts the store in jeopardy, so the girls plan a party to remind the couple of their good times. But Mrs. Garrett soon finds out the source of the stress in their marriage, and it is a surprise to her.
102	25	"The Way We Were"	Asaad Kelada	Jerry Mayer	May 9, 1984	525
103	26	"The Way We Were"	Asaad Kelada	Jerry Mayer	May 9, 1984	526
As the girls prepare for their summer vacations, they look back on the past, as seen in clips from previous episodes. Blair and Jo ultimately get into a major argument, so Natalie and Tootie try to patch things up between the two. Note: The clips shown are taken from "Rough Housing", "I.Q.", "Overachieving", "Emily Dickinson", "Running", "Dope", "The New Girl: Part 1", "The New Girl: Part 2", "Double Standard", "Who Am I?", "Teenage Marriage: Part 1", "Gossip", "The Secret", "Front Page", "Dear Me", "Green-Eyed Monster", "The Four Musketeers", "New York, New York", "Kids Can Be Cruel", "September Song", "Let's Party", "Guess Who's Coming to Dinner?", "Take My Finals, Please", "Crossing the Line" and "Big Fish/Little Fish".

=== Season 6 (1984–85) ===
Mrs. Garrett (Charlotte Rae) was absent from several episodes in season 6 per Rae's request for reduced appearances, as she felt that the girls' characters were maturing and not requiring as much of Mrs. Garrett's rearing and advice; despite requests from the producers, Rae continued this process until leaving the program in season 8. Deidre Faye & Stuart Wolpert are now executive producers until season 8.

The Facts of Life, season 6 episodes
No. overall	No. in season	Title	Directed by	Written by	Original release date	Prod. code
104	1	"The Summer of '84"	Asaad Kelada	Linda Marsh & Margie Peters	September 26, 1984	605
The girls recount their summer breaks: Tootie tried to act more grown up while Natalie attracted the attention of a precocious kid, Mrs. Garrett recounts a summer romance, Jo played the piano, and Blair spent time on a farm in Iowa. John Astin (Mackenzie Astin's real life father) appears in this episode as Mrs. Garrett's summer love.
105	2	"A Slice of Life" "Slices of Life"	Asaad Kelada	Jerry Mayer	October 3, 1984	604
Natalie invests in Jo’s new pizza business on Tootie’s behalf without her permission, and all three soon find themselves in a mess. Blair refuses to help, and Jo soon has to take some unauthorized short cuts.
106	3	"Love at First Byte"	Asaad Kelada	Bob Myer & Bob Young	October 17, 1984	606
Natalie uses a computer dating system to find dates for Blair and Jo and isn’t completely honest with them (or her own date) about the process. Mrs. Garrett searches for a new bridge partner, and Tootie is unwillingly recruited.
107	4	"My Boyfriend's Back"	Asaad Kelada	Bob Myer & Bob Young	October 24, 1984	601
Mrs. Garrett is feeling the pressure of a busy shop with Jo at home for the week and Tootie distracted by her boyfriend Jeff, who seems to have changed at college. She worries that she has to take a big step in order to keep him. Note: Nancy McKeon does not appear in this episode. This is her first absence in the season. This is also the first taped episode of this season.
108	5	"Cruisin'"	John Bowab	Paul Haggis	October 31, 1984	609
The girls spend the evening driving around Peekskill. Blair worries about being seen cruising, Tootie tries to win a radio contest, Jo is excited to spot cars and motorcycles, and Natalie just wants to scout guys. Notes: This is the first episode to feature Kim Fields without her braces since season three. Nancy McKeon returns after her first absence from the previous episode. This is also the first and only episode that premiered without a laugh track and live audience. Due to that reason, this episode was filmed in single-camera format for the only time.
109	6	"Taking a Chance on Love"	Asaad Kelada	Gail Honigberg	November 7, 1984	607
110	7	"Taking a Chance on Love"	Asaad Kelada	Gail Honigberg	November 7, 1984	608
Part 1: Jo begins to see her photography professor, Sam (Kristoffer Tabori), and the rest of the girls are super invested in the relationship. Blair worries that other students at the college might be gossiping, and Sam soon tells Jo he has a son. Part 2:Jo meets Sam’s son and ends up getting wrapped up in his life. Blair is worried, and shares her own experiences with step parents. Mrs. Garrett tries some new things to liven up the shop including themed costumes.
111	8	"E.G.O.C. (Edna Garrett on Campus)"	John Bowab	Janis Hirsch	November 14, 1984	610
Blair and Jo convince Mrs. Garrett to take a Shakespeare class at Langley with them, but they don’t take her seriously as a student. Meanwhile Natalie and Tootie make some unauthorized changes to the pastries at the shop.
112	9	"Dear Apple"	John Bowab	Story by : Deidre Fay & Stuart Wolpert; Teleplay by : Paul Haggis	November 21, 1984	611
After one forgets to give the other an important message, Jo and Blair end up in a bitter back and forth while Blair vies to win a “Helen of Troy” contest. Jo tries to sort out the fight by talking to a computer.
113	10	"Talk, Talk, Talk"	John Bowab	Bob Myer & Bob Young	November 28, 1984	614
After a series of unfortunate incidents, Jo winds up with a ton of time to kill and no music to play during her shift at the college radio station. The girls and Mrs. Garrett try to help but they have their own issues, especially Blair, who really needs romance advice.
114	11	"Smile"	Asaad Kelada	Story by : Mark Miller; Teleplay by : Linda Marsh & Margie Peters	December 5, 1984	602
Mrs Garrett receives daily roses from a secret admirer. Natalie stresses about a job interview at a newspaper office while her boyfriend stresses about a wrestling match. Note: This is Nancy McKeon's second and final absence in the series. This is the second episode filmed for the season.
115	12	"The Rich Aren't Different"	John Bowab	J.P. Duffy	December 12, 1984	613
Jo and Blair end up in small claims court when Jo breaks Blair’s watch. Natalie and Tootie end up taking sides, much to Mrs. Garrett’s chagrin.
116	13	"Christmas in the Big House"	John Bowab	Jerry Mayer	December 19, 1984	615
Blair organizes a Christmas show at what she thinks is a home for young boys but is really a prison. She is hesitant to go, but Jo convinces everyone that the men there deserve some Christmas cheer.
117	14	"Me and Eleanor"	John Bowab	Paul Haggis	January 2, 1985	616
Mrs. Garrett needs help for a big catering job, and hires an eager neighborhood boy named Andy. Tootie tries to write her own play for the theater competition but Natalie, who used to write Tootie’s plays for her, hates it. Note: Mackenzie Astin marks his first appearance as Andy Moffett in this episode. He is credited as a guest star in four other episodes (16, 18, 21, 24) in the season and departs after the twenty-fourth episode. Starting in the seventh season, he is added as an semi-regular and becomes a main cast member in the eighth and ninth seasons.
118	15	"Working it Out"	Asaad Kelada	Linda Marsh & Margie Peters	January 9, 1985	603
After breaking up with Cliff, Blair changes her dating habits and flouts the house rules, to Mrs. Garrett’s shock. Tootie tries to change her style. Natalie stresses about her permanent record, and Jo stresses about picking a major.
119	16	"Jazzbeau"	Ellen Chaset Falcon	Rick Lombardo & Patrick Cleary	January 16, 1985	617
Andy is bummed that he has to spend the evening with Mrs Garrett and the girls. Tootie and Natalie recount their summer working in the Poconos with an unassuming waiter who is secretly a jazz legend. Guest starring Bill Henderson as Art 'Jazzbeau' Jackson.
120	17	"Two Guys from Appleton"	John Bowab	Paul Haggis	January 23, 1985	618
Mrs Garrett’s high school sweetheart Ted and his son Kevin stop by the shop on their way to Canada. Kevin charms the girls while Mrs Garrett and Ted rekindle their romance… and make some rash decisions. Note: Ryan Cassidy marks his first appearance as Kevin Metcalf in this episode. He is the guest star in episodes 18–, 21, 24 in the season and departs the series after the twenty-fourth episode.
121	18	"With a Little Help from My Friends"	John Bowab	Deidre Fay & Stuart Wolpert	January 30, 1985	619
With the freezer on the fritz, Mrs Garrett opens the shop on Sunday and enlists Tootie, Natalie, and Andy to sell cheesecakes. Blair realizes her boyfriend is buying cocaine, and Jo helps her see the severity of the situation. Note: This is the first episode that marks Mackenzie Astin as a guest star. He is the guest star in episodes 21 and 24 along with Ryan Cassidy.
122	19	"Gone with the Wind: Part 1"	John Bowab	Kimberly Hill	February 13, 1985	621
The girls jet down to Florida to spend spring break at Natalie’s grandmother’s condo. Tootie gets caught up in the moment and invites a ton of strangers over for a party, Jo gets wooed by a rockstar, and Natalie frets about a hurricane. Note: Charlotte Rae was absent in this episode. This is her first absence in the season. She was absent in the five following episodes. Michael Damian makes his first appearance as rock singer Flyman.
123	20	"Gone with the Wind: Part 2"	John Bowab	Kimberly Hill	February 20, 1985	622
The girls clean up the condo after the party. Jo and Natalie get sunburn, which threatens to ruin their dates. Blair hesitates about her crush on the handyman, and Tootie is just determined to have a good time. Note: This is Charlotte Rae's second absence in the series.
124	21	"Man in the Attic"	John Bowab	Paul Haggis	February 27, 1985	623
Kevin is desperate for a place to live, so he moves into the attic. When he quickly becomes a nuisance, the girls try to create some boundaries. Everyone finds out that Jo and Kevin have been keeping a secret, and things get complicated. Note: This is Charlotte Rae's third absence in the series.
125	22	"The Last Drive-In"	John Bowab	Paul Haggis, Kimberly Hill and Stuart Wolpert	March 13, 1985	624
Chaos erupts as the girls attend the last night at the drive-in theater. Blair is desperate to get home after the car is stolen, Tootie harps on the details, Jo wants to steal a souvenir, and Natalie refuses to believe the place should close. Note: This is Charlotte Rae's fourth absence in the series.
126	23	"Sisters"	John Bowab	Bob Myer & Bob Young	March 20, 1985	625
The girls try to handle the shop without Mrs. Garrett on Langley’s busy alumni weekend. A visit by Blair’s mother overlaps with a visit by Jo’s father, and they spend time together while Jo and Blair are busy, which leads to a fight. Note: This is Charlotte Rae's fifth absence in the series.
127	24	"It's Lonely at the Top"	John Bowab	Jerry Mayer	March 27, 1985	626
When a competing croissant shop opens, Blair takes it upon herself to make sure Edna’s Edibles remains on top, and the power goes to her head. Tootie and Natalie think Jo should be in charge, but Jo is wrapped up in a float for the student council parade. Note: This is Charlotte Rae's sixth absence in the series. This is also Ryan Cassidy's final appearance on the show. After this episode, he was quietly dismissed. Mackenzie Astin also marks his final guest star appearance in this episode before returning in season seven. This is the final episode taped for the sixth season.
128	25	"Bus Stop"	Judi Elterman	Story by : Brian Pollack & Rick Shaw; Teleplay by : Kimberly Hill	May 8, 1985	620
When Natalie graduates from Eastland, she shocks her mother and her friends by deciding not to go to college. Note: Charlotte Rae returns in this episode after her six-episode absence.
129	26	"The Interview Show"	John Bowab and Stuart Wolpert	Deidre Fay & Stuart Wolpert	May 15, 1985	612
A former student who is planning on writing a book on Eastland interviews Mrs. Garrett and the girls.

=== Season 7 (1985–86) ===
Mrs. Garrett (Charlotte Rae) was again absent from several episodes per Rae's request for reduced appearances. Starting this season, Mackenzie Astin, who plays Andy Moffett, and George Clooney, who plays George Burnett, receive billing in the opening credits.

The Facts of Life, season 7 episodes
No. overall	No. in season	Title	Directed by	Written by	Original release date	Prod. code
130	1	"Out of the Fire..."	John Bowab	Paul Haggis	September 14, 1985	701
The girls return from summer break to find the store gutted by a fire, and they are shocked when Mrs. Garrett reveals that she might not want to rebuild. Tootie and Natalie have an idea for a new business. Note: Starting this season, Mackenzie Astin as Andy Moffett becomes a main character. The Edna's Edibles backdrop is used only for the first three episodes in this season. Also, starting with this episode, the writing and directing credits are moved to the beginning and the producer credits are moved to the end.
131	2	"Into the Frying Pan"	John Bowab	Deidre Fay & Stuart Wolpert	September 21, 1985	702
Mrs. Garrett hires a handsome young contractor to fix up the shop. Blair, Tootie, and Natalie keep distracting him, but Jo isn’t impressed. The girls workshop names for their new store. Note: George Clooney as George Burnett starts his recurring character run in this episode.
132	3	"Grand Opening"	John Bowab	Bob Bendetson & Howard Bendetson	September 28, 1985	703
Over Our Heads, the new novelty shop, has its grand opening. The girls struggle to connect with any customers, and they find out one of their products is counterfeit. Mrs. Garrett has second thoughts about running the store. Note: This is the last episode of the Edna's Edibles backdrop in the opening credits. In the next episode, Over Our Heads become the series' new backdrop.
133	4	"Teacher, Teacher"	John Bowab	Story by : Cheri Eichen & Bill Steinkellner; Teleplay by : Bruce Ferber & David Lerner	October 5, 1985	705
Jo thinks she has her future figured out when she begins student teaching, but a big company wants to talk to her about a software position. Mrs. Garrett and the rest of the girls help Jo host a retirement party for her teaching mentor. Irene Tedrow and Joyce Bulifant guest star as Jo's coworkers at the elementary school. Note: Over Our Heads is marked the season's new backdrop at the first scene of the opening credits in this episode until the show's series finale.
134	5	"Men for All Seasons"	John Bowab	Fredi Towbin & Larry Strauss	October 19, 1985	704
Langley threatens to pull their merchandise from Over Our Heads if the store insists on selling a controversial calendar of the swim team. Natalie, who pushed Mrs. Garrett to sell the calendar to make her swimmer boyfriend happy, tries to take responsibility.
135	6	"A New Life"	John Bowab	Linda Elstad	October 26, 1985	706
Blair’s mother comes for a visit with news that she’s pregnant. Blair doesn’t agree with her plans. Mrs. Garrett and Fred, the hardware store owner, drum up ideas to win business back from a new shopping center.
136	7	"Doo-Wah"	John Bowab	Bob Bendetson & Howard Bendetson	November 2, 1985	709
Andy enters the girls into a contest to sing backup for El DeBarge, but the girls don't like Andy's questionable taste level. Meanwhile, Tootie leads everyone in setting up the new store computer for inventory, and Mrs. Garrett is desperate to finish her last term paper. Siedah Garrett also guest stars.
137	8	"Come Back to the Truck Stop, Natalie Green, Natalie Green"	John Bowab	Michael Maurer	November 9, 1985	708
Natalie goes on a road trip looking for things to write about. While waiting at a truck stop she imagines a wild story, starring some familiar faces. Charo appears in this episode.
138	9	"Born Too Late"	John Bowab	Bob Brush	November 16, 1985	710
Mrs. Garrett’s former fiance sends her a bird that continues to express love for her. Tootie helps Andy practice for a production of West Side Story, and soon finds herself the object of his affections.
139	10	"3, 2, 1"	John Bowab	Paul Haggis	November 23, 1985	711
Jo and Blair work together on a TV program for a journalism class project, but they disagree on what to present and it leads Jo to stage a rebellion. Tootie rallies for a segment about Over Our Heads, and Andy tries to push George out of it.
140	11	"We Get Letters"	John Bowab	Story by : Deidre Fay & Stuart Wolpert; Teleplay by : Susan Beavers	November 30, 1985	707
Andy gets the idea to dress up as a mime and perform in the shop window, much to Blair’s annoyance as she had made a window display out of newspaper. Mrs. Garrett hosts an old friend (Anne Jackson) who thinks she is hiding a secret.
141	12	"Ballroom Dance"	John Bowab	Story by : Carlo Allen; Teleplay by : Deidre Fay & Stuart Wolpert	December 7, 1985	712
Jo signs up for a ballroom dance class at the gym where Natalie teaches jazzercise, and she ends up making a connection with her assigned partner. Mrs. Garrett is excited to offer Jo a vintage dress for the occasion.
142	13	"Christmas Baby"	John Bowab	David Lerner & Bruce Ferber	December 14, 1985	714
Everyone tries to get ready for Christmas. Jo is wrapping gifts, Natalie wants to open them, and Tootie gives toasts. Blair is an overprotective coach before and during her mother’s labor, which is narrated by Baby Bailey.
143	14	"Tootie Drives"	John Bowab	Story by : Paul Haggis and Stuart Wolpert; Teleplay by : Paul Haggis	December 21, 1985	713
Tootie asks the other girls to teach her how to drive, but they all just end up driving her crazy. Meanwhile, Mrs. Garrett and Andy try to find ways around the town’s new pink flamingo ban.
144	15	"Stake-Out Blues"	John Bowab	Jake Weinberger & Michael Weinberger	January 11, 1986	715
The girls don't want Mrs. Garrett to worry when the police plan a stakeout at the shop to catch criminals selling counterfeit bus passes. Note: Mrs. Garrett is planning on meeting her sister Beverly (who has just been divorced). Beverly will take over Mrs. Garrett's place in Season 8.
145	16	"The Agent"	John Bowab	Jack Elinson	January 18, 1986	716
In order to boost the career of an aspiring comic, Tootie stages a performance where Jim McCawley, the talent coordinator for 'The Tonight Show', will be in attendance.
146	17	"The Reunion"	John Bowab	Racelle Friedman	February 1, 1986	718
George takes Jo to his high school reunion where he passes her off as a duchess to impress a girl he once admired.
147	18	"Concentration"	John Bowab	Martha Williamson	February 8, 1986	717
Blair learns a valuable lesson when she becomes trapped in an elevator with her baby sister Bailey and a concentration camp survivor (Nehemiah Persoff).
148	19	"Atlantic City"	John Bowab	Paul Haggis	February 15, 1986	720
The girls travel to Atlantic City to see Flyman, Jo's fling from spring break. Michael Damian makes his third and final appearance as Flyman.
149	20	"The Lady Who Came to Dinner"	John Bowab	Story by : Patrick Cleary; Teleplay by : Bart Lindsay & Robert Billson	February 22, 1986	721
After a misunderstanding about Blair's birthday wishes, the party performer herself (vaudevillian Betty Kean) ends up staying with the girls. Note: Mindy Cohn is absent for the first and only time. This is Charlotte Rae's fourth absence in the season and overall her tenth absence in the series. This is also George Clooney's last episode in the season. He made four guest star appearances in Season 8, and did not appear in Season 9.
150	21	"The Candidate"	Valentine Mayer	Michael Maurer	March 1, 1986	722
Blair and Natalie go head-to-head when Natalie learns a big political secret about the current mayor.
151	22	"Big Time Charlie"	Steven Robman	Bob Myer & Bob Young	March 29, 1986	719
Jo's father Charlie goes on an extravagant shopping spree after winning $300,000 in a magazine contest. Also, Natalie returns from Florida with the wrong suitcase, losing Tootie's new camera in the process.
152	23	"The Graduate"	John Bowab	Barry Vigon	May 3, 1986	723
In part one of the season seven finale, Mrs. Garrett returns for Tootie's graduation in time to learn what she and Natalie plan to do about their own futures. Note: This is Mackenzie Astin's final episode as a recurring character. Starting in the eighth season, he becomes a series regular.
153	24	"The Apartment"	John Bowab	Jane Anderson	May 10, 1986	724
In the conclusion of the season seven finale, Natalie and Tootie move into a new apartment and quickly learn that living on their own is not all it's cracked up to be. Note: This is Charlotte Rae's last episode as a main cast member. Rae made her final appearances in the eighth season two-part premiere "Out of Peekskill Part 1" and "Out of Peekskill Part 2".

=== Season 8 (1986–87) ===
Mrs. Garrett (Charlotte Rae) remarries and leaves the series after the two part season premiere. Her sister, Beverly Ann Stickle (Cloris Leachman), moves in to care for the house and business. George Burnett, played by George Clooney, becomes a recurring character. Richard Gurman is the executive producer for this season.

The Facts of Life, season 8 episodes
No. overall	No. in season	Title	Directed by	Written by	Original release date	Prod. code
154	1	"Out of Peekskill"	John Bowab	Michael Maurer, Richard Gurman and Paul Haggis	September 27, 1986	801
155	2	"Out of Peekskill"	John Bowab	Michael Maurer, Richard Gurman and Paul Haggis	September 27, 1986	802
Mrs. Garrett becomes reacquainted with Dr. Bruce Gaines (Robert Mandan), a man she met when she was serving in the Peace Corps. He proposes marriage to her, and she accepts. Her sister, Beverly Ann Stickle (Cloris Leachman), comes to the wedding in her Winnebago. In spite of a scare at Depressed Person's Cliff, Mrs. Garrett and Bruce are married, and they rejoin the Peace Corps, leaving for Africa. Beverly Ann takes over Edna's duties at Over Our Heads. Notes: Starting this season, both Cloris Leachman and Mackenzie Astin become main cast regulars. Charlotte Rae made a guest star appearance and departs the series after this two-part one hour season opening.
156	3	"Ready or Not"	John Bowab	Jane Anderson	October 4, 1986	803
Beverly Ann and the girls are concerned that Tootie is getting much too serious about her new boyfriend Rudy.
157	4	"Another Room"	John Bowab	Story by : Katherine Green; Teleplay by : Michael Maurer & Martha Williamson	October 11, 1986	805
Fed up with having no privacy, Jo considers moving out, until Beverly Ann suggests remodeling the attic into a room, but Jo has concerns about the construction costs.
158	5	"Off-Broadway Baby"	John Bowab	Martha Williamson	November 1, 1986	807
Beverly Ann and the girls head for New York City, when Tootie decides to audition for her first Broadway show. However, when she arrives, she quickly learns that she has plenty of competition working against her. Pop star Stacey Q guest stars as Cinnamon.
159	6	"The Little Chill"	Valentine Mayer	Phil Doran & Douglas Arango	November 8, 1986	808
Three of the original Eastland girls (Cindy, Nancy, and Sue Ann) return for a reunion and Jo feels left out because she didn't know them very well. (Note: Felice Schachter, Julie Ann Haddock, and Julie Piekarski reprise their season 1 main cast roles as Nancy Olsen, Cindy Webster, and Sue Ann Weaver, respectively.)
160	7	"The Ratings Game"	John Bowab	Ross Brown	November 15, 1986	809
Blair's computerized date-rating system is the focus when she makes a bet with Jo dealing with whether or not the system really works. However, when Beverly Ann accidentally erases a computer disk, Jo tampers with some of the ratings.
161	8	"The Wedding Day"	John Bowab	Story by : Shirley Brown; Teleplay by : Ross Brown and Michael Poryes	November 22, 1986	811
Jo offers to marry an immigrant so he can stay in the country. Note: George Clooney's character George Burnett appears in this episode and three others this season. Episode #15 A Star is Torn is his last appearance.
162	9	"Fast Food"	Marian Deaton	Michael Maurer	November 29, 1986	810
Natalie hires Blair as an employee at Señor Sombrero, the Mexican restaurant where she is assistant manager.
163	10	"Where's Poppa?"	John Bowab	Micki Raton and Irma Kalish & Phil Doran & Douglas Arango	December 6, 1986	804
Blair is distraught after her father pleads guilty to charges of insider trading.
164	11	"Write and Wrong"	John Bowab	Jane Anderson & Ross Brown	December 13, 1986	806
A furious Natalie is determined to identify and sue the plagiarist who sold her short story to a magazine. Vaudeville comedienne Billie Bird appears as Andy's grandmother.
165	12	"Seven Little Indians"	John Bowab	John Boni	January 3, 1987	812
On a dark and stormy night, the girls and their friends are stalked by a mysterious killer. Maurice LaMarche appears as "Rod Sperling" in this The Twilight Zone-ish episode.
166	13	"The Greek Connection"	John Bowab	Sara V. Finney & Vida Spears	January 10, 1987	813
Assigned by the newspaper to investigate Pledge Week at Langley College, Natalie crashes the rush party of the sorority Tootie wants to join. Penelope Ann Miller guest stars.
167	14	"Post-Christmas Card"	John Bowab	Matt Gellar	January 17, 1987	815
As a post-Christmas gift, Natalie gets her first credit card and promptly goes on a spending spree.
168	15	"A Star Is Torn"	John Bowab	Martha Williamson	January 31, 1987	816
Cinnamon (Stacey Q), who bested Tootie in the audition for a Broadway rock musical, arrives. She claims that she has been replaced in the show, but it is not the real story. Note: George Clooney marks his final appearance on the show, billed as a special guest star.
169	16	"A Winter's Tale"	John Bowab	Bob Underwood	February 7, 1987	814
The girls go to a ski resort. Doug Savant guest stars as an engaged young man who falls in love with Blair.
170	17	"Cupid's Revenge"	John Bowab	John Boni	February 14, 1987	817
Romantic perversity occurs when all the girls' old boyfriends happen to show up just before the Valentine's Day dance.
--	--	"The Facts of Life Down Under"	Stuart Margolin	Gordon Cotler	February 15, 1987	--
A cultural exchange program sends Beverly Ann and the girls (with Andy) to Australia where they find love and intrigue: Blair and Jo dodge a couple of jewel thieves, Natalie gets lost in the outback, Tootie makes friends with a handsome stranger (Mario Van Peebles), and Beverly Ann and Andy visit a sheep ranch. Note: Originally a two-hour movie, is shown in four half-hour episodes in syndication.
171	18	"'62 Pick-Up"	John Bowab	Phil Doran & Douglas Arango	February 21, 1987	819
A flashback to the early 1960s, replete with teen idols, beatniks, and girl groups. Bobby Rydell and Fabian guest star.
172	19	"Boy About the House"	John Bowab	Austin and Irma Kalish	February 28, 1987	818
Beverly Ann decides to adopt Andy when his foster parents divorce. Jay Johnson appears in this episode's sub-plot.
173	20	"Ex Marks the Spot"	John Bowab	Story by : Katherine Green & Richard Gurman; Teleplay by : Michael Maurer & Michael Poryes	March 7, 1987	820
Beverly Ann's ex-husband, Frank Stickle (Dick Van Patten), comes to visit and suffers a heart attack. Lois Nettleton guest stars.
174	21	"Younger Than Springtime"	John Bowab	Lawrence H. Levy	March 21, 1987	821
Jo is unhappy that Blair is playing matchmaker for Jo's father Charlie, but she is really upset with the final results.
175	22	"This Is Only a Test"	Valentine Mayer	Ross Brown & Martha Williamson	April 18, 1987	822
Blair discovers that even she cannot buy admission to law school if she does not pass a four-hour admissions test for which she has not studied.
176	23	"Rites of Passage: Part 1"	John Bowab	Matt Geller & Racelle Friedman	May 2, 1987	823
After her commencement speech is rejected, Jo refuses to make a speech at all, but then learns that her grandfather (Sheldon Leonard) has come all the way from Poland to hear it.
177	24	"Rites of Passage: Part 2"	Marian Deaton	Michael Poryes	May 9, 1987	824
Summer offers a variety of options for everyone, especially Jo, who is offered a tempting job in Los Angeles.

=== Season 9 (1987–88) ===
Pippa McKenna, played by Sherrié Austin, is introduced as a recurring character. Irma Kalish is the executive producer for the final season.

The Facts of Life, season 9 episodes
No. overall	No. in season	Title	Directed by	Written by	Original release date	Prod. code
178	1	"Down and Out in Malibu: Part 1"	John Bowab	Martha Williamson	September 26, 1987	903
Jo is stranded in Malibu for the summer and gets a job housesitting for Richard Moll.
179	2	"Down and Out in Malibu: Part 2"	John Bowab	Ross Brown	October 3, 1987	904
Richard Moll has Beverly Ann, Blair, Tootie and Natalie arrested when he discovers his house has been damaged.
180	3	"Rumor Has It"	John Bowab	Michael Poryes	October 17, 1987	901
Things get interesting in Blair's law class when a rumor goes around campus about her and the professor.
181	4	"Before the Fall"	John Bowab	R.J. Colleary	October 24, 1987	905
Natalie lands a freelance assignment from the local newspaper to do an undercover article on Langley's ROTC, which may lead to more assignments. But she must face her fears when the job entails skydiving from an airplane. Dennis Haysbert has a small role as a drill sergeant.
182	5	"Sweet Charity"	John Bowab	Phil Doran & Douglas Arango	November 7, 1987	907
Jo goes looking for a job only to find one in the least likely place, and it is up to Blair to save the community center from going under.
183	6	"Up from Down Under"	John Bowab	Austin and Irma Kalish	November 14, 1987	910
Pippa McKenna, a teenage girl from Eastland's Australian sister school Colunga Academy, enrolls at Eastland as part of its exchange program. Notes: Sherrie Krenn marks her first appearance as Pippa McKenna in this episode, she is marked on/off regular in few episodes and then becomes a main regular in the thirteenth episode. This episode also features new opening credit sequences for Lisa Whelchel and Mackenzie Astin.
184	7	"The More the Marrier"	Valentine Mayer	Lawrence H. Levy	November 21, 1987	908
It's winter carnival time and Tootie has her hands full when her boyfriend Jeff shows up. Natalie's boyfriend Snake (Robert Romanus) is introduced.
185	8	"A Rose by Any Other Age"	John Bowab	Mark Tuttle & Barbara Berkowitz	November 28, 1987	902
Blair has the hots for her study partner, but he is more interested in Beverly Ann. Meanwhile, Andy tries to get help with a bully.
186	9	"Adventures in Baileysitting"	John Bowab	Story by : Jeri Barchilon & Michele Gendleman; Teleplay by : Jeri Barchilon	December 5, 1987	912
Blair's baby sister Bailey gets lost while in the girls' care; Tootie gets her engagement ring.
187	10	"It's a Wonderful Christmas"	Valentine Mayer	Marily Anderson & Renee Orin	December 12, 1987	909
Beverly Ann feels unwanted at Christmas and wonders what it would be like if she had never come to Peekskill.
188	11	"Golden Oldies"	John Bowab	John Boni	January 2, 1988	906
The girls imagine what their lives will be like decades in the future. Bill Macy appears as Jo's ex-husband.
189	12	"A Thousand Frowns"	John Bowab	Harvey Weitzman and David DiGregorio & Arnie Wess	January 9, 1988	911
Jo meets Rick Bonner (Scott Bryce in his first of four appearances) at a community center while trying to find Andy a male role model. Rick is turning 30, and believes he will die soon, as no men in his family have lived longer than his upcoming age. Note: This is Sherrie Krenn's last episode as a recurring character, becoming a main cast member in the next episode and for the rest of the season. This is also the final episode showing the eighth season cast scene at the end of the opening credits.
190	13	"Something in Common"	John Bowab	Michael Poryes	January 16, 1988	917
Jo's dad comes for a visit and finds Rick has more in common with him than he likes. Meanwhile, after consulting with the girls and Mrs. Garrett, plans are made by Beverly Ann to close unprofitable Over Our Heads and convert the retail space into bedrooms for Pippa and Andy. Notes: Kim Fields is absent for the first and only time in this episode. Sherrie Krenn continues the season as a main cast member in this episode. A new ninth season cast scene set around the piano is seen at the end of the opening credits and continues the rest of the season. This is also the final episode to feature the Over Our Heads store set.
191	14	"Peekskill Law"	John Bowab	Mark Tuttle	January 23, 1988	918
Blair gets involved in a big law case but the lawyer ends up being her ex-professor.
192	15	"A House Divided"	John Bowab	Mark Tuttle	January 30, 1988	913
Natalie and Tootie plan the perfect evening with their boyfriends, only to have the two end up fighting and causing the girls to take sides.
193	16	"The First Time"	Marian Deaton	Ross Brown	February 6, 1988	915
Natalie loses her virginity to her boyfriend Snake (Robert Romanus) on their one-year anniversary. Note: This is the only episode of the series in which Blair does not appear, said to be on a trip to Beverly Hills with her mother. The show’s producers originally planned for Blair to lose her virginity in the episode; however, actress Lisa Whelchel refused and had been written out of this controversial episode to take part due to her religious beliefs. It also is the highest-rated episode of the season.
194	17	"Let's Face the Music"	John Bowab	Phil Doran & Douglas Arango	February 13, 1988	916
A slip-up at a beauty parlor turns Jo's hair blonde and Blair's hair green, causing problems at a fundraiser event. Later, in a fantasy sequence, Pippa's band and the girls perform at the event.
195	18	"Less Than Perfect"	Valentine Mayer	Martha Williamson	February 20, 1988	914
Blair gets into a serious car accident when she falls asleep at the wheel, and she is devastated when it results in a large cut across her forehead. Note: The ninth season cast piano scene from the opening credits was taken during the filming of this episode.
196	19	"Till Marriage Do Us Part"	John Bowab	Ross Brown	February 27, 1988	922
Rick proposes to Jo and after some thought and reflection she accepts, becoming the first of the girls to get married.
197	20	"Present Imperfect"	John Bowab	Kathy Lette	March 5, 1988	920
When Jeff's grandmother (Beah Richards) gives Tootie an ugly pendant, Pippa loses it and then it gets damaged. Tootie then has to stand up to Jeff's grandma to get her blessing.
198	21	"On the Edge"	John Bowab	R.J. Colleary	March 12, 1988	919
Jo finds herself in a tough spot when the suicide counselor decides she wants to die, and it is up to Jo to talk her out of it.
199	22	"Big Apple Blues"	John Bowab	Martha Williamson	March 19, 1988	921
Natalie moves to an apartment in SoHo, where she meets some eccentric characters. David Spade and Richard Grieco guest star.
200	23	"The Beginning of the End"	John Bowab	Austin and Irma Kalish	April 30, 1988	923
When Blair discovers that Eastland is in dire financial straits, she decides she has to make a tough decision about her future: she uses her trust fund to buy the school and save it from closing. Eastland becomes coed. Juliette Lewis, Mayim Bialik, Seth Green, Meredith Scott Lynn and Kathleen Freeman appear in this two-part finale. Note: This is part one of the two-part series finale, with less focus on the core group and the introduction of many new characters in what seems to be the set up for a spin-off that never happened. It is also the 200th episode of the show and Mackenzie Astin's final appearance.
201	24	"The Beginning of the Beginning"	John Bowab	Austin and Irma Kalish	May 7, 1988	924
Blair faces her first challenge as headmistress of Eastland as she helps a student who is trying to get expelled. Note: This is the conclusion of the series; the girls end up going their own ways: Blair is at Eastland, Tootie is off to acting school in London, Natalie has moved to SoHo to pursue her writing career, and Jo's husband Rick returns from his European tour to start their married lives.

== Reunion ==
Title	Directed by	Written by	Original release date
"The Facts of Life Reunion"	Charles Herman-Wurmfeld	Max Enscoe & Annie de Young	November 18, 2001
Blair, Natalie and Tootie reunite in Peekskill, New York to spend Thanksgiving with Mrs. Garrett, but trouble soon starts when Natalie receives two different marriage proposals and her two boyfriends unexpectedly show up. Nancy McKeon was unable to reprise her role as Jo due to scheduling conflicts with her then-starring role in the Lifetime series The Division. Note: Originally aired as a presentation of The Wonderful World of Disney.
