= List of Touched by an Angel episodes =

The American dramatic television series Touched by an Angel premiered on CBS on September 21, 1994 and ran for nine seasons until its conclusion on April 27, 2003. Its 211 episodes chronicled the cases of two angels, Monica (Roma Downey) and her supervisor Tess (Della Reese), who bring messages from God to various people to help them as they reach a crossroads in their lives. In the second season, the character Andrew (John Dye), was introduced as the angel of death, and in the last two seasons, a new trainee, Gloria (Valerie Bertinelli) is added to the regular cast.

Created by John Masius and produced by Martha Williamson, the series eventually became one of CBS highest-rated series during its third through six seasons, peaking at the sixth highest rated show during its fourth season. Ratings dropped significantly in the eighth season after it was moved from Sunday to Saturday. The episodes use one opening theme, "Walk with You", a song performed by Reese.

== Series overview ==
Season	Episodes	Originally released		Rank	Rating
Season	Episodes	First released	Last released	Rank	Rating
1	11	September 21, 1994	March 4, 1995	81	8.9
2	24	September 23, 1995	May 18, 1996	34	11.1
3	28	September 15, 1996	May 18, 1997	10	13.6
4	27	September 21, 1997	May 17, 1998	6	14.2
5	26	September 20, 1998	May 23, 1999	8	13.1
6	26	September 26, 1999	May 21, 2000	10	11.6
7	25	October 15, 2000	May 20, 2001	22	9.7
8	22	September 29, 2001	May 11, 2002	68	TBA
9	22	September 28, 2002	April 27, 2003	88	5.1

== Episodes ==
=== Season 1 (1994–95) ===
No. overall	No. in season	Title	Directed by	Written by	Original release date	Prod. code	Viewers (millions)
1	1	"The Southbound Bus"	Jerry J. Jameson	Martha Williamson	September 21, 1994	101	13.7
2	2	"Show Me the Way to Go Home"	Tim Bond	Chris Ruppenthal	September 28, 1994	102	12.7
3	3	"Tough Love"	Tim Van Patten	Del Shores	October 12, 1994	104	12.9
4	4	"Fallen Angela"	Bruce Kessler	Martha Williamson and Marilyn Osborn	October 19, 1994	103	12.4
5	5	"Cassie's Choice"	Burt Brinkerhoff	Dawn Prestwich and Nicole Yorkin	October 26, 1994	105	12.0
6	6	"The Heart of the Matter"	Max Tash	Chris Ruppenthal	November 2, 1994	106	12.9
7	7	"An Unexpected Snow"	Timothy Bond	Martha Williamson	December 7, 1994	107	11.2
8	8	"Manny"	Tim Van Patten	Dawn Prestwich and Nicole Yorkin	December 14, 1994	108	11.5
9	9	"Fear Not!"	Tim Van Patten	Ken LaZebnik	December 25, 1994	110	14.2
10	10	"There But for the Grace of God"	Bruce Bilson	Story by : Martha Williamson; Teleplay by : Martha Williamson and R.J. Colleary	February 25, 1995	111	14.5
11	11	"The Hero"	Max Tash	Marilyn Osborn	March 4, 1995	109	13.5

=== Season 2 (1995–96) ===
No. overall	No. in season	Title	Directed by	Written by	Original release date	Prod. code	Viewers (millions)
12	1	"Interview with an Angel"	Helaine Head	Teleplay by : Martha Williamson; Story by : Marilyn Osborn & Martha Williamson	September 23, 1995	202	12.7
13	2	"Trust"	Victor Lobl	Jule Selbo	September 30, 1995	204	15.7
14	3	"Sympathy for the Devil"	Tim Van Patten	R.J. Colleary	October 7, 1995	201	16.0
15	4	"The Driver"	Tim Van Patten	Glenn Berenbeim	October 14, 1995	203	15.9
16	5	"Angels on the Air"	Bruce Bilson	R.J. Colleary	October 21, 1995	113	14.3
17	6	"In the Name of God"	Tim Van Patten	Martha Williamson	October 28, 1995	112	14.4
18	7	"Reunion"	Victor Lobl	Valerie Woods	November 4, 1995	206	17.4
19	8	"Operation Smile"	Nancy Malone	Glenn Berenbeim & R.J. Colleary & Martha Williamson	November 11, 1995	205	19.0
20	9	"The Big Bang"	Chuck Bowman	Ken LaZebnik	November 25, 1995	207	16.2
21	10	"Unidentified Female"	Michael Schultz	Martha Williamson	December 2, 1995	208	14.9
22	11	"The Feather"	Gene Reynolds	Story by : Valerie Woods & Ken LaZebnik & Robin Sheets; Teleplay by : Valerie Woods & Ken LaZebnik	December 16, 1995	211	16.0
23	12	"The One That Got Away"	Victoria Hochberg	Debbie Smith & Danna Doyle	January 6, 1996	209	19.2
24	13	"'Til We Meet Again"	Tim Van Patten	Martha Williamson	January 13, 1996	210	19.5
25	14	"Rock 'n' Roll Dad"	Tim Van Patten	Andrew Smith	January 20, 1996	212	20.9
26	15	"Indigo Angel"	Jon Andersen	Glenn Berenbeim & R.J. Colleary	February 3, 1996	213	21.1
27	16	"Jacob's Ladder"	Michael Schultz	Story by : Ken LaZebnik; Teleplay by : Martha Williamson	February 10, 1996	214	20.5
28	17	"Out of the Darkness"	Victoria Hochberg	R.J. Colleary	February 17, 1996	215	18.6
29	18	"Lost and Found"	Bethany Rooney	Debbie Smith & Danna Doyle	February 24, 1996	216	20.7
30	19	"Dear God"	Tim Van Patten	Glenn Berenbeim	March 9, 1996	217	19.4
31	20	"Portrait of Mrs. Campbell"	Victor Lobl	Susan Cridland Wick	March 23, 1996	218	N/A
32	21	"The Quality of Mercy"	Chuck Bowman	Andrew Smith	April 27, 1996	219	15.5
33	22	"Flesh and Blood"	Jon Andersen	R.J. Colleary	May 4, 1996	221	17.8
34	23	"Birthmarks"	Peter Hunt	Ken LaZebnik	May 11, 1996	222	16.8
35	24	"Statute of Limitations"	Victor Lobl	Danna Doyle & Debbie Smith	May 18, 1996	220	18.2

=== Season 3 (1996–97) ===
No. overall	No. in season	Title	Directed by	Written by	Original release date	Prod. code	Viewers (millions)
36	1	"Promised Land"	Michael Schultz	Martha Williamson	September 15, 1996	X99	19.3
37	2	"A Joyful Noise"	Peter Hunt	Katherine Ann Jones	September 21, 1996	302	18.5
38	3	"Random Acts"	Tim Van Patten	R.J. Colleary & Martha Williamson	September 22, 1996	303	20.68
39	4	"Sins of the Father"	Tim Van Patten	Debbie Smith & Danna Doyle	September 29, 1996	301	19.30
40	5	"Written in Dust"	Peter Hunt	Teleplay by : Ken LaZebnik; Story by : Ken LaZebnik & Jack LaZebnik	October 6, 1996	304	17.8
41	6	"Secret Service"	Bethany Rooney	Kathleen McGhee-Anderson	October 13, 1996	305	18.99
42	7	"Groundrush"	Peter Hunt	Story by : Glenn Berenbeim; Teleplay by : Burt Pearl	October 27, 1996	306	21.10
43	8	"The Sky Is Falling"	Victor Lobl	Glenn Berenbeim	November 3, 1996	307	19.70
44	9	"Something Blue"	Terrence O'Hara	Susan Cridland Wick & Jennifer Wharton	November 10, 1996	308	22.33
45	10	"Into the Light"	Victor Lobl	R.J. Colleary	November 17, 1996	309	21.16
46	11	"Homecoming: Part 1"	Peter Hunt	William Schwartz & Martha Williamson	November 24, 1996	310	22.66
47	12	"The Journalist"	Tim Van Patten	Ken LaZebnik	December 1, 1996	311	21.14
48	13	"The Violin Lesson"	Peter Hunt	Glenn Berenbeim	December 22, 1996	312	18.61
49	14	"Forget Me Not"	Michael Schultz	Burt Pearl	January 12, 1997	313	24.25
50	15	"Smokescreen"	Victor Lobl	Christine Pettit & Rosanne Welch	January 19, 1997	314	21.26
51	16	"Crisis of Faith"	Peter Hunt	William Schwartz	February 2, 1997	316	21.25
52	17	"Angel of Death"	Tim Van Patten	Story by : George Taweel & Rob Loos; Teleplay by : Glenn Berenbeim	February 9, 1997	317	21.94
53	18	"Clipped Wings"	Robert J. Visciglia, Jr.	R.J. Colleary	February 16, 1997	315	21.64
54	19	"Amazing Grace: Part 1"	Victor Lobl	Martha Williamson	February 23, 1997	318A	18.07
55	20	"Labor of Love"	Jim Johnston	Susan Cridland Wick	March 9, 1997	319	24.42
56	21	"Have You Seen Me?"	Stuart Margolin	Story by : R.J. Colleary; Teleplay by : Pamela Redford Russell	March 16, 1997	320	23.01
57	22	"Last Call"	Gene Reynolds	Ken LaZebnik	March 30, 1997	321	22.30
58	23	"Missing in Action"	Tim Van Patten	Rosanne Welch & Christine Pettit	April 13, 1997	322	20.63
59	24	"At Risk"	Victor Lobl	Kathleen McGhee-Anderson	April 27, 1997	323	23.18
60	25	"Full Moon"	Tim Van Patten	Glenn Berenbeim	May 4, 1997	324	20.11
61	26	"An Angel by Any Other Name"	Gabrielle Beaumont	Burt Pearl	May 10, 1997	325	15.71
62	27	"Inherit the Wind"	Michael Schultz	R.J. Colleary	May 11, 1997	326	20.49
63	28	"A Delicate Balance"	Tim Van Patten	Teleplay by : Debbie Smith & Danna Doyle; Story by : Jennifer Wharton	May 18, 1997	327	22.17

=== Season 4 (1997–98) ===
No. overall	No. in season	Title	Directed by	Written by	Original release date	Prod. code	Viewers (millions)
64	1	"The Road Home: Part 1"	Tim Van Patten	E.F. Wallengren & Mimi Schmir	September 21, 1997	403	23.18
65	2	"Great Expectations"	Tim Van Patten	Teleplay by : Christine Pettit & Rosanne Welch; Story by : Christine Pettit & Rosanne Welch and Mary Siversten & Lynn Wing	September 28, 1997	401	22.97
66	3	"Nothing But Net"	Victor Lobl	Daniel H. Forer & R.J. Colleary	October 5, 1997	402	18.80
67	4	"Children of the Night"	Victor Lobl	Suzonne Stirling	October 12, 1997	404	22.94
68	5	"Jones vs. God"	Sandor Stern	Ken LaZebnik	October 19, 1997	405	21.11
69	6	"The Pact"	Bethany Rooney	Teleplay by : Jennifer Wharton; Story by : Jennifer Wharton & Melissa Milne	October 26, 1997	406	21.67
70	7	"Sandcastles"	Victor Lobl	Burt Pearl	November 2, 1997	408	22.30
71	8	"My Dinner with Andrew"	Gabrielle Beaumont	Martha Williamson	November 9, 1997	409	26.94
72	9	"Charades"	Victor Lobl	Glenn Berenbeim	November 16, 1997	410	25.62
73	10	"The Comeback"	Sandor Stern	Kenny Solms	November 23, 1997	411	26.67
74	11	"Venice"	Gabrielle Beaumont	R.J. Colleary	December 7, 1997	412	24.41
75	12	"It Came Upon a Midnight Clear"	Michael Schultz	Ken LaZebnik	December 21, 1997	413	20.77
76	13	"Deconstructing Harry"	Burt Brinckerhoff	Burt Pearl	January 4, 1998	414	25.41
77	14	"The Trigger"	Peter Hunt	Rosanne Welch & Christine Pettit	January 11, 1998	415	24.05
78	15	"Doodlebugs"	Terrence O'Hara	Ken LaZebnik	January 18, 1998	407	20.13
79	16	"Redeeming Love"	Burt Brinckerhoff	Marilyn Osborn & Kathleen McGhee-Anderson	February 1, 1998	416	24.10
80	17	"Flights of Angels"	Peter H. Hunt	Teleplay by : Ken LaZebnik; Story by : Sally Storch Bunkall & Sally Howell	March 1, 1998	419	21.57
81	18	"Breaking Bread"	Peter H. Hunt	Burt Pearl	March 8, 1998	417	22.52
82	19	"God and Country"	Bethany Rooney	R.J. Colleary & Glenn Berenbeim	March 15, 1998	418	22.24
83	20	"How Do You Spell Faith?"	Bethany Rooney	Michael Glassberg	March 29, 1998	420	24.83
84	21	"Seek and Ye Shall Find"	Victor Lobl	Glenn Berenbeim	April 5, 1998	421	20.72
85	22	"Cry, and You Cry Alone"	Gene Reynolds	R.J. Colleary	April 12, 1998	422	17.53
86	23	"Perfect Little Angel"	Terrence O'Hara	Teleplay by : Susan Cridland Wick; Story by : Susan Cridland Wick and Ann Elder & Jeannine Tree	April 26, 1998	423	22.73
87	24	"Elijah"	Peter H. Hunt	Glenn Berenbeim	May 3, 1998	424	19.54
88	25	"Last Dance"	Terrence O'Hara	Jennifer Wharton & R.J. Colleary	May 10, 1998	425	19.89
Special–1	SPE1	"True Stories From Touched by an Angel"	Jon Andersen	Martha Williamson & Daniel H. Forer	May 13, 1998	TBA	12.93
89	26	"The Spirit of Liberty Moon"	Tim Van Patten	Martha Williamson	May 17, 1998	426	20.47
90	27	"The Spirit of Liberty Moon"	Tim Van Patten	Martha Williamson	May 17, 1998	427	20.47

=== Season 5 (1998–99) ===
No. overall	No. in season	Title	Directed by	Written by	Original release date	Prod. code	Viewers (millions)
91	1	"Miles to Go Before I Sleep"	Peter H. Hunt	Story by : Jon Andersen; Teleplay by : Burt Pearl	September 20, 1998	502	19.58
92	2	"Saving Grace: Part 1"	Victor Lobl	Steven Phillip Smith	September 27, 1998	501	19.56
93	3	"What Are Friends For?"	Peter H. Hunt	Martha Williamson	October 4, 1998	504	19.44
94	4	"Only Connect"	Tim Van Patten	Ken LaZebnik	October 11, 1998	503	18.79
95	5	"The Lady of the Lake"	Michael Scott	Burt Pearl	October 18, 1998	506	19.44
96	6	"Beautiful Dreamer"	Peter H. Hunt	Glenn Berenbeim & Martha Williamson	October 25, 1998	507	17.08
97	7	"I Do"	Victor Lobl	R.J. Colleary	November 1, 1998	505	20.31
98	8	"The Wind Beneath My Wings"	Stuart Margolin	Rosanne Welch	November 8, 1998	509	21.69
99	9	"Psalm 151"	Sandor Stern	Martha Williamson	November 15, 1998	508	23.50
100	10	"The Peacemaker"	Peter H. Hunt	Christine Pettit	November 22, 1998	510	21.40
101	11	"An Angel on the Roof"	Stuart Margolin	Ken LaZebnik	December 13, 1998	511	20.38
102	12	"Fool for Love"	Peter H. Hunt	Susan Cridland Wick & Burt Pearl	January 3, 1999	512	24.39
103	13	"The Medium and the Message"	Noel Nosseck	R.J. Colleary	January 10, 1999	513	19.21
104	14	"My Brother's Keeper"	Peter H. Hunt	Teleplay by : Jennifer Wharton; Story by : Hoot Maynard & Jennifer Wharton	February 7, 1999	514	21.04
105	15	"On Edge"	Tim Van Patten	R.J. Colleary	February 14, 1999	515	22.17
106	16	"The Man Upstairs"	Peter H. Hunt	Glenn Berenbeim	February 21, 1999	516	21.09
107	17	"Family Business"	Tim Van Patten	Martha Williamson & R.J. Colleary	February 28, 1999	518	21.54
108	18	"Anatomy Lesson"	Sandor Stern	Ken LaZebnik	March 7, 1999	517	23.06
Special–2	SPE2	"More True Stories"	Unknown	Unknown	March 10, 1999	TBA	8.93
109	19	"Jagged Edges"	Gregory Harrison	Jennifer Wharton & Burt Pearl	March 28, 1999	519	20.15
110	20	"Into the Fire"	Tim Van Patten	Brian Bird	April 4, 1999	520	18.71
111	21	"Made in the U.S.A."	Bethany Rooney	Christine Pettit & Rosanne Welch	April 11, 1999	521	19.53
112	22	"Full Circle"	Victor Lobl	Daniel H. Forer	April 25, 1999	523	18.19
113	23	"Black Like Monica"	Tim Van Patten	Martha Williamson	May 2, 1999	524	18.38
114	24	"Fighting the Good Fight"	Tim Van Patten	Michael Glassberg	May 9, 1999	522	17.83
115	25	"Hearts"	Victor Lobl	Susan Cridland Wick & R.J. Colleary	May 16, 1999	525	20.39
116	26	"Godspeed"	Tim Van Patten	Glenn Berenbeim	May 23, 1999	526	18.10

=== Season 6 (1999–2000) ===
No. overall	No. in season	Title	Directed by	Written by	Original release date	Prod. code	Viewers (millions)
117	1	"Such a Time as This"	Martha Mitchell	Martha Williamson	September 26, 1999	603	18.36
118	2	"The Compass"	Peter H. Hunt	Glenn Berenbeim & Martha Williamson	October 3, 1999	604	16.73
119	3	"The Last Day of the Rest of Your Life"	Robert J. Visciglia, Jr.	Burt Pearl	October 10, 1999	605	17.03
120	4	"The Letter"	Peter H. Hunt	Danna Doyle	October 17, 1999	602	18.11
121	5	"Til Death Do Us Part"	Tim Van Patten	Rosanne Welch & Christine Pettit	October 24, 1999	601	19.06
122	6	"The Occupant"	Larry Peerce	Jon Andersen	October 31, 1999	606	17.74
123	7	"Voice of an Angel"	Peter H. Hunt	Glenn Berenbeim	November 14, 1999	607	19.69
124	8	"The Whole Truth and Nothing But..."	Sandor Stern	Teleplay by : Brian Bird; Story by : Kenny Solms & Brian Bird	November 21, 1999	608	15.72
125	9	"Then Sings My Soul"	Peter H. Hunt	Burt Pearl & Glenn Berenbeim	November 28, 1999	610	18.52
126	10	"The Christmas Gift"	Stuart Margolin	Teleplay by : Ken LaZebnik; Story by : Ken LaZebnik & Patrice Chanel	December 12, 1999	611	18.06
127	11	"Millennium"	Robert J. Visciglia, Jr.	Martha Williamson	January 2, 2000	612	21.89
128	12	"With God as My Witness"	Stuart Margolin	R.J. Colleary	January 9, 2000	609	18.87
129	13	"A House Divided"	Bethany Rooney	Rosanne Welch	January 23, 2000	613	16.11
130	14	"Buy Me a Rose"	Peter H. Hunt	R.J. Colleary	February 6, 2000	614	19.82
131	15	"Life Before Death"	Martha Mitchell	Glenn Berenbeim	February 13, 2000	616	19.29
132	16	"A Perfect Game"	Martha Mitchell	Burt Pearl	February 20, 2000	615	18.16
133	17	"Here I Am"	Joel J. Feigenbaum	Ken LaZebnik	February 27, 2000	617	15.64
134	18	"Bar Mitzvah"	Jeff Kanew	Allen Estrin & Joseph Telushkin	March 12, 2000	618	19.30
135	19	"True Confessions"	Larry Peerce	Brian Bird	March 19, 2000	619	17.04
136	20	"Quality Time"	Peter H. Hunt	Rosanne Welch	April 2, 2000	620	17.10
137	21	"Living the Rest of My Life"	Tim Van Patten	Teleplay by : Della Reese & Burt Pearl; Story by : Della Reese Lett	April 9, 2000	621	17.60
138	22	"Stealing Hope"	Peter H. Hunt	Jason Jersey	April 23, 2000	622	15.71
139	23	"Monica's Bad Day"	Tim Van Patten	R.J. Colleary	April 30, 2000	623	16.64
140	24	"A Clown's Prayer"	Larry Peerce	Glenn Berenbeim	May 7, 2000	624	14.99
141	25	"Mother's Day"	Victor Lobl	Martha Williamson	May 14, 2000	625	16.95
142	26	"Pandora's Box"	Tim Van Patten	Story by : Donna Rice Hughes & Daniel H. Forer; Teleplay by : Daniel H. Forer	May 21, 2000	626	17.33

=== Season 7 (2000–01) ===
No. overall	No. in season	Title	Directed by	Written by	Original release date	Prod. code	Viewers (millions)
143	1	"The Face on the Barroom Floor"	Peter H. Hunt	Teleplay by : Martha Williamson & Burt Pearl; Story by : Daniel H. Forer	October 15, 2000	704	15.09
144	2	"Legacy"	Bethany Rooney	Jennifer Wharton	October 22, 2000	703	13.95
145	3	"The Invitation"	Michael Schultz	Teleplay by : Jon Andersen & R.J. Colleary; Story by : Jon Andersen	October 29, 2000	705	16.23
146	4	"Restoration"	Robert J. Visciglia, Jr.	R.J. Colleary	November 5, 2000	706	13.32
147	5	"Finger of God"	Robert J. Visciglia, Jr.	Burt Pearl & Susan Cridland Wick	November 12, 2000	701	15.18
148	6	"The Empty Chair"	Jeff Kanew	Martha Williamson	November 19, 2000	707	13.81
149	7	"God Bless the Child"	Victor Lobl	Glenn Berenbeim	November 26, 2000	709	14.28
150	8	"Reasonable Doubt"	Peter H. Hunt	Burt Pearl	December 3, 2000	708	16.27
151	9	"The Grudge"	Peter H. Hunt	Arnold Margolin	December 10, 2000	702	15.87
152	10	"An Angel on My Tree"	Larry Peerce	Brian Bird	December 17, 2000	712	15.52
153	11	"Mi Familia"	Victor Lobl	Rosanne Welch	January 7, 2001	711	16.82
154	12	"The Lord Moves in Mysterious Ways"	Joel J. Feigenbaum	R.J. Colleary	January 21, 2001	710	12.43
155	13	"A Death in the Family"	Stuart Margolin	Teleplay by : E.F. Wallengren; Story by : Allen Estrin & Joseph Telushkin	February 4, 2001	713	15.47
156	14	"Bringer of Light"	Robert J. Visciglia, Jr.	Luke Schelhaas	February 11, 2001	714	15.82
157	15	"Thief of Hearts"	Stuart Margolin	Jason Jersey	February 18, 2001	715	13.98
158	16	"Winners, Losers and Leftovers"	Peter H. Hunt	Rosanne Welch	February 25, 2001	716	14.62
159	17	"I Am an Angel"	Larry Peerce	R.J. Colleary	March 11, 2001	717	12.30
160	18	"Visions of Thy Father"	Peter H. Hunt	Mark Goffman	March 18, 2001	718	13.51
161	19	"The Penalty Box"	Bethany Rooney	Brian Bird	April 8, 2001	719	12.89
162	20	"Band of Angels"	Stuart Margolin	Jennifer Wharton	April 15, 2001	721	12.94
163	21	"The Sign of the Dove"	Jeff Kanew	Martha Williamson & Burt Pearl	April 22, 2001	720	12.88
164	22	"The Face of God"	Victor Lobl	Glenn Berenbeim	April 29, 2001	722	12.18
165	23	"Netherlands"	Kevin Dowling	Teleplay by : Martha Williamson & Luke Schelhaas; Story by : Martha Williamson	May 6, 2001	723	14.36
166	24	"Shallow Water: Part 1"	Peter H. Hunt	Story by : Martha Williamson & Burt Pearl; Teleplay by : Burt Pearl	May 13, 2001	724	11.66
167	25	"Shallow Water: Part 2"	Peter H. Hunt	Martha Williamson & Burt Pearl	May 20, 2001	725	13.14

=== Season 8 (2001–02) ===
No. overall	No. in season	Title	Directed by	Written by	Original release date	Prod. code	Viewers (millions)
168	1	"Holy of Holies"	Bethany Rooney	Martha Williamson and Burt Pearl & Luke Schelhaas	September 29, 2001	805	8.99
169	2	"The Perfect Game"	Frank E. Johnson	Glenn Berenbeim	October 6, 2001	803	9.53
170	3	"The Birthday Present"	Peter H. Hunt	R.J. Colleary	October 13, 2001	806	10.29
171	4	"Manhunt"	Victor Lobl	Danna Doyle	October 20, 2001	804	9.04
172	5	"Chutzpah"	Frank E. Johnson	Teleplay by : Allen Estrin & Joseph Telushkin; Story by : Allen Estrin & Joseph Telushkin and Daniel H. Forer	October 27, 2001	801	8.13
173	6	"Famous Last Words"	Peter H. Hunt	Brian Bird	November 3, 2001	808	10.16
174	7	"Most Likely to Succeed"	Stuart Margolin	Burt Pearl	November 10, 2001	809	10.72
175	8	"Heaven's Portal"	Bethany Rooney	Glenn Berenbeim	November 24, 2001	810	12.41
176	9	"When Sunny Gets Blue"	Frank E. Johnson	Jason Jersey	December 1, 2001	807	8.76
177	10	"Angels Anonymous"	Larry Peerce	R.J. Colleary	December 15, 2001	811	9.08
178	11	"A Winter Carol"	Victor Lobl	Martha Williamson & Burt Pearl	December 16, 2001	813	14.64
179	12	"The Last Chapter"	Ricardo Mendez Matta	Martha Williamson	January 12, 2002	812	8.07
180	13	"Ship-in-a-Bottle"	Armand Mastroianni	Rita Russell	January 26, 2002	814	7.93
181	14	"The Blue Angel"	Larry Peerce	Glenn Berenbeim	February 2, 2002	816	8.65
182	15	"Secrets and Lies"	Armand Mastroianni	Brian Bird	March 2, 2002	817	8.59
183	16	"The Princeless Bride"	Kevin Dowling	Luke Schelhaas	March 9, 2002	818	7.66
184	17	"Hello, I Love You"	Frank E. Johnson	R.J. Colleary	April 6, 2002	815	8.14
185	18	"Minute by Minute"	Robert J. Visciglia, Jr.	Rosanne Welch	April 13, 2002	802	6.85
186	19	"The Bells of St. Peters"	Robert J. Visciglia, Jr.	Glenn Berenbeim	May 4, 2002	819	7.27
187	20	"The Impossible Dream"	Peter H. Hunt	Brian Bird	May 4, 2002	820	8.02
188	21	"For All the Tea in China"	Stuart Margolin	Martha Williamson & Luke Schelhaas	May 5, 2002	822	10.30
189	22	"Forever Young"	Victor Lobl	R.J. Colleary	May 11, 2002	821	7.43

=== Season 9 (2002–03) ===
No. overall	No. in season	Title	Directed by	Written by	Original release date	Prod. code	Viewers (millions)
190	1	"A Rock and a Hard Place"	Kevin Dowling	Martha Williamson and Burt Pearl	September 28, 2002	901	7.18
191	2	"The Sixteenth Minute"	Jim Charleston	John Wierick	October 5, 2002	904	7.47
192	3	"Two Sides to Every Angel"	Larry Peerce	Story by : Roma Downey, Brian Bird and R.J. Colleary; Teleplay by : Brian Bird and R.J. Colleary	October 12, 2002	903	7.90
193	4	"The Word"	Stuart Margolin	Ken LaZebnik	October 19, 2002	902	8.13
194	5	"A Feather on the Breath of God"	Victor Lobl	Glenn Berenbeim	October 26, 2002	906	7.59
195	6	"Jump!"	John Dye	Brian Bird	November 2, 2002	908	8.61
196	7	"Bring On the Rain"	Armand Mastroianni	R.J. Colleary and Burt Pearl	November 9, 2002	909	8.49
197	8	"Remembering Me: Part 1"	Bethany Rooney	Burt Pearl	November 16, 2002	905	8.02
198	9	"Remembering Me: Part 2"	Armand Mastroianni	Luke Schelhaas	November 23, 2002	907	8.80
199	10	"The Christmas Watch"	Peter H. Hunt	Ken LaZebnik	December 21, 2002	910	6.95
200	11	"Private Eyes"	Julia Rask	R.J. Colleary and Ken LaZebnik	January 11, 2003	911	7.62
201	12	"The Root of All Evil"	Michael Schultz	R.J. Colleary	January 25, 2003	914	7.62
202	13	"A Time for Every Purpose"	John Behring	Story by : E.F. Wallengren and John Wierick; Teleplay by : John Wierick	February 1, 2003	916	7.19
203	14	"And a Nightingale Sang"	Peter H. Hunt	Story by : Jennifer Wharton; Teleplay by : Burt Pearl and Ken LaZebnik	February 8, 2003	912	7.81
204	15	"As It Is in Heaven"	Victor Lobl	Martha Williamson and Luke Schelhaas	February 15, 2003	915	8.40
205	16	"Song for My Father"	Ricardo Mendez Matta	Brian Bird	February 22, 2003	913	8.56
206	17	"The Good Earth"	Ben Lewin	Luke Schelhaas	March 1, 2003	917	7.74
207	18	"Virtual Reality"	Larry Peerce	Story by : Daniel H. Forer; Teleplay by : Burt Pearl and Daniel H. Forer	March 15, 2003	918	6.61
208	19	"The Show Must Not Go On"	Frank E. Johnson	Story by : R.J. Colleary; Teleplay by : Brian Bird and Ken LaZebnik	April 12, 2003	920	4.88
209	20	"At the End of the Aisle"	Jim Charleston	Story by : Martha Williamson; Teleplay by : Burt Pearl and Luke Schelhaas	April 19, 2003	919	6.83
210	21	"I Will Walk with You: Part 1"	Larry Peerce	Story by : Martha Williamson; Teleplay by : Martha Williamson, Burt Pearl & Luke Schelhaas	April 26, 2003	921	8.60
211	22	"I Will Walk with You: Part 2"	Larry Peerce	Story by : Martha Williamson; Teleplay by : Martha Williamson, Burt Pearl & Luke Schelhaas	April 27, 2003	922	12.90

== See also ==
- List of Promised Land episodes
