= W. David McBrayer =

American film producer

- McBrayer in 2004 while filming Beat the Drum in South Africa
- Born: US
- Education: University of Tennessee; Michigan State University
- Occupation: Film Producer
- Awards: Clio Award (1976–1985); International Award for Advertising Excellence (1976–1985); International Television Association Gold Medal Award for Multi-Media (1976–1985); Outstanding AVID reseller award (1985–1999); UPS Excellence in Business (1985–1999); Global Association of Independent Television Award for Outstanding Drama Programming (2000); Montreal Zenith D'Or (2003); Monaco International Film Festival Angel Award (2003)

William David McBrayer is an American film and television producer, writer, and entrepreneur.

== Education ==
McBrayer attended the University of Tennessee. He was president of the Student Art League and, while an undergraduate, was published in Perceptual and Motor Skills for his research in perception entitled "Effects of Social Influence in a Recognition Task of Auditory Intensity." His primary interest was the nexus of art/the creative process/psychology. He graduated from UTC in 1973 with a B.S. in psychology. He received an MA in advertising/mass communications from Michigan State University in 1976 and was the recipient of the Graduate Award for advertising. While in graduate school at MSU, McBrayer co-founded PACE Marketing Group, a market research company that conducted consumer research on the UPC for a Senate sub-committee.

== Career ==
=== New York (1976–1985) ===
McBrayer began his advertising career on Madison Avenue in 1976, with Grey Advertising on the Procter & Gamble account, before joining Young & Rubicam/Worldwide, the world's largest advertising agency at the time. McBrayer went client-side, at age 27, to become Senior Vice President, Advertising & Brand Management, with Culbro's General Cigar Division, the youngest senior executive in the company's 75-year history. McBrayer later founded Ad Associates, Inc., an advertising and communications company, and co-founded National Market Measures, a Cleveland, Ohio-based market research company whose clients included The World Bank. He sold National Market Measures in 1987.

During his ten years in the New York ad industry, McBrayer won numerous national and international advertising awards, including the prestigious Clio Award, the International Award for Advertising Excellence, the International Television Association Gold Medal Award for Multi-Media, and various print industry readership awards.

=== Next steps (1985–1999) ===
McBrayer co-founded Digital Solutions, Inc., an Atlanta-based technology company specializing in digital non-linear editing systems for the film and television industry. DSI was recognized as one of the most successful and innovative companies of its kind in the digital broadcasting industry. While president of DSI, he won the Outstanding AVID reseller award, and McBrayer was selected by UPS for Excellence in Business for his Golden Rule approach to business-to-business marketing. Under his leadership, Digital Solutions created the DSI-AVID Educational Center to train professional editors in the latest film and television techniques.

In the mid-1990s, McBrayer also co-founded Z Post, LLC, a television production and post-production company with facilities in Atlanta and Los Angeles. Z Post's clients included Turner Broadcasting, the Cartoon Network, Vanity Fair, Avid Technology, Fox Broadcasting, Channel 36, Warner Bros. Records, the Billy Graham Association and Walk Thru the Bible. Z Post produced "Creating Hollywood Style Special Effects on the Avid Media Composer," the first authorized training CD-ROM for Avid Technology, the industry leader in television and film editing and special effects technology.

In 1998, McBrayer sold Digital Solutions for an undisclosed amount.

In 1999, McBrayer created, wrote (along with Touched by an Angel writer Bob Colleary) and executive produced a television pilot entitled Postcards From Heaven, starring Marion Ross and John Haymes Newton Postcards From Heaven won the Global Association of Independent Television Award for Outstanding Drama Programming in 2000. McBrayer was awarded the top prize by famed writer/producer Stephen Cannell.

In 2000, Z Post produced "Hope For Africa", a hard-hitting, six-part television series highlighting the AIDS epidemic in Africa, which aired on the South African Broadcasting Corporation (SABC). The series was shot on location in South Africa and Kenya. It was during this trip that McBrayer got the inspiration for his 2003 film, Beat The Drum. In 2000, SABC aired "Hope for Africa", in Swaziland and more newspapers were sold that day in the paper's entire history because of the special brochure that was produced to accompany the series.

While filming "Hope for Africa" in Kenya, McBrayer and the production team met with Kenya's then-president Daniel arap Moi at Moi's private estate to discuss "Hope for Africa." The event was featured on Kenyan television and radio. President Moi asked the team to continue its efforts to bring awareness about the AIDS crisis in Africa.

=== Beat The Drum ===
In 2002 McBrayer formed Z Productions LLC in Los Angeles, California, and moved the post-production company, Z Post LLC, to Hollywood.

McBrayer began writing the script for the feature film, Beat the Drum following his initial trip to Africa. The film tells the story of a young Zulu boy, Musa, who is orphaned after a mysterious "curse" strikes his village. To help his grandmother, Musa sets out for Johannesburg with his father's last gift, a handmade tribal drum, in search of work and his uncle. The journey confronts him with the stark realities of urban life, but his spirit never wavers. He later returns to his village with a truth and understanding his elders have failed to grasp: that the "curse" that is killing their people is in fact AIDS, a disease that can be prevented.

McBrayer assembled an all South African production team and shot the film in just 26 days during the summer of 2002 on-location in Johannesburg and KwaZulu-Natal. The film is dedicated "to Beatrice," his mother, who died in October 2002, during post production.

Starring Clive Scott and Owen Sejake, Beat the Drum premiered at the 2003 Mill Valley Film Festival. The feature film has won numerous international awards, including the prestigious Montreal Zenith D'Or, which was televised live on Montreal television, and the Monaco International Film Festival Angel Award, the festival's top honor, presented to Mr. McBrayer by Miss France.

McBrayer has said that he wrote Beat The Drum to "help give a voice to the voiceless." I simply wanted to be an honest witness to the plight of these kids. When there is a tear in the human fabric, we should all feel it."

Variety heralded the film as "Spectacular," calling it a "handsome well-crafted family drama...naturalistic performances...affecting human drama...first-rate!" Leonard Maltin of Entertainment Tonight called it, "a film with a big heart and a vital message." The Hollywood Reporter said, "Audiences were enthralled by this movie." In its on-air interview with director David Hickson and young star Junior Singo (Musa) CNN called the movie, "Profoundly moving and spiritually uplifting."

The movie is represented by Sidney Kimmel International. In 2008 MGM secured the international rights to "Beat the Drum"; Genius/Harvey Weinstein Company acquired the domestic U.S. DVD rights, and the DVD was first released in 2008. Showtime/The Movie Channel has contracted for the exclusive North American television rights.

Beat the Drum has won over thirty international film festival awards, including Best Picture, Best Director (David Hickson), Best Supporting Actor, (Owen Sejake), Best Actor (Junior Singo), Best Music (Klaus Badelt and Ramin Djawadi), and several Audience Awards W. David McBrayer wrote and produced the movie. Beatthedrum.com.

In cooperation with Sky Films, proceeds from airline sales of the movie, which was aired in-flight on all major international airlines, provided the financial resources to establish The Beat the Drum Village in Kenya for AIDS orphans. This non-profit project is ongoing and provides family-style housing, financial support, education, and medical care for orphans with HIV/AIDS.
