= Beat the Drum =

- DVD cover
- Directed by: David Hickson
- Written by: W. David McBrayer
- Produced by: W. David McBrayer; Karen S. Shapiro; Richard Shaw
- Starring: Nthati Moshesh; Junior Singo
- Cinematography: Lance Gewer
- Edited by: Mark Winitsky
- Music by: Klaus Badelt; Ramin Djawadi
- Release date: October 10, 2003
- Running time: 114 minutes
- Countries: South Africa; United States
- Languages: English; Zulu
- Budget: US$1.5 million

Beat the Drum, written and produced by W. David McBrayer and directed by David Hickson, is a South African film starring Clive Scott and Owen Sejake.

Premiering at the 2003 Mill Valley Film Festival, Beat The Drum won 30 international film festival awards, including the prestigious Montreal Zenith D'Or and the Monaco International Film Festival Angel Award, the festival's top honor. The film also won Best Picture, Best Director (David Hickson), Best Supporting Actor (Owen Sejake), Best Actor (Junior Singo), Best Music (Klaus Badelt and Ramin Djawadi) and several Audience Awards.

McBrayer has said that he wrote Beat The Drum to "help give a voice to the voiceless. I simply wanted to be an honest witness to the plight of these kids. When there is a tear in the human fabric we should all feel it."

== Synopsis ==
A young South African orphan named Musa leaves his AIDS-ravaged village in KwaZulu-Natal, taking only a drum given to him by his late father, for the gritty streets of Johannesburg, in search of work and his uncle. Musa encounters friendship and kindness but also struggles against criminality and indifference.

In the midst of the epidemic, a young philanthropic lawyer from a privileged family learns he has AIDS, and a truck driver's sexual proclivities endanger the health of his wife.

== Reception ==
Variety heralded the film as “Spectacular," calling it a "handsome well-crafted family drama...naturalistic performances...affecting human drama...first-rate!" Leonard Maltin of Entertainment Tonight called it, "a film with a big heart and a vital message.” The Hollywood Reporter said, "Audiences were enthralled by this movie." In its on-air interview with director David Hickson and young star Junior Singo (Musa) CNN called the movie, "Profoundly moving and spiritually uplifting."

== Beat the Drum Village ==
Due to the efforts of the film's producers, Kimmel International, and President of Entertainment in Motion, Bill Grant, a portion of the proceeds from the film's domestic and international airlines sales provided the resources to buy the land and initiate the project that would become Beat the Drum Village. Beat the Drum Village provides family-style housing, food, clothing, education and medical care for children orphaned by and living with HIV/AIDS in Kenya.

== Soundtrack ==
Beat the Drum: Original Motion Picture Soundtrack

Film score by Klaus Badelt Ramin Djawadi
- Released: February 13, 2003
- Genre: Soundtrack
- Length: 53:19
- Producer: Dessie Markovsky

The film score for Beat the Drum was composed by Klaus Badelt and Ramin Djawadi. The soundtrack album was released on February 13, 2003.

No.	Title	Length
1.	"The Village"	5:32
2.	"Thandi / Sacrifice"	3:46
3.	"The Journey"	2:47
4.	"Nobe & Musa"	2:25
5.	"Jo'burg"	1:31
6.	"The Muthi Market"	1:42
7.	"Wash For A Rand, Part 1"	2:33
8.	"On The Streets"	2:08
9.	"We Do Not Talk About It"	2:07
10.	"Wash For A Rand, Part 2"	2:53
11.	"Musa's Theme"	2:41
12.	"Have You Seen T?"	1:20
13.	"Stephan Passed Away"	0:45
14.	"One More Stop"	1:59
15.	"Returning Home"	1:55
16.	"What Has Happened"	1:20
17.	"Wait For Elder"	1:11
18.	"Hallucination"	1:15
19.	"Lauren's Revelation"	2:37
20.	"Thandi's Theme"	2:27
21.	"Did God Send You?"	3:11
22.	"Brand New Day"	5:14
Total length:		53:19
