= James McBryer =

Scottish footballer

Personal information
- Full name: James McBryer
- Date of birth: 8 October 1890
- Place of birth: Dennistoun, Scotland
- Position: Left back

Senior career*
Years	Team	Apps	(Gls)
1915–1916	Queen's Park	4	(0)
- * Club domestic league appearances and goals

James McBryer was a Scottish amateur footballer who played as a left back in the Scottish League for Queen's Park.

== Personal life ==
McBryer studied to be an engineer. He was a volunteer with the British Red Cross during the First World War and also served as a motor boat engineer in Basra, Iraq.

== Career statistics ==
Appearances and goals by club, season and competition
Club	Season	League			Scottish Cup		Total	
Club	Season	Division	Apps	Goals	Apps	Goals	Apps	Goals
Queen's Park	1914–15	Scottish First Division	1	0	0	0	1	0
Queen's Park	1916–17	Scottish First Division	3	0	0	0	3	0
Career total			4	0	0	0	4	0
