= Martha Williamson =

American screenwriter

- Born: 1955 (age 70–71); Denver, Colorado, U.S.
- Education: Williams College (BA)
- Occupations: Television producer; writer
- Spouse: Jon Andersen (m. 1998)
- Children: 2
- Website: marthawilliamson.com

Martha Williamson (born 1955) is an American television producer and writer, best known as the head writer and executive producer of the long-running hit CBS television series Touched by an Angel.

== Career ==
Williamson began her career in television working on musical variety programs for Carol Burnett, Walt Disney Television, and others. She wrote and produced for half-hour comedies such as the long-running The Facts of Life and The Family Man with Gregory Harrison. She made the transition to one-hour drama as producer of Jack's Place for ABC Television and Co-Executive Producer of the CBS series Under One Roof, which starred James Earl Jones.

In 1994, she became the Executive Producer of Touched by an Angel. Two years later, when Promised Land premiered in 1996, she became the second woman to simultaneously produce two American television dramas. Touched by an Angel was nominated for nine Emmy Awards and was inducted into the Museum of Television and Radio Hall of Fame. It has been translated into more than sixty languages and continues to be broadcast around the world.

Williamson later became the host of A Touch of Encouragement on Beliefnet.com.

Her awards include the Freedom Works Award from the U.S. Congress, the Edward R. Murrow Responsibility in Television Award, the Producers Guild Nova Award, the Templeton Prize, as well as honors from the Anti-Defamation League, the NAACP, the Salvation Army, and Catholics in Media.

In 2003, she was appointed to the President's White House Council on Service and Civic Participation.

She was named in 2007 by her publisher as one of the "12 Most Powerful Christians in Hollywood".

She created the TV series Signed, Sealed, Delivered, which premiered in 2013 on the Hallmark Channel and on Hallmark Movies & Mysteries.

== Personal life ==
Williamson was born and raised in Denver, Colorado. Her parents jointly ran a management company. After attending college thanks to a Gates Scholarship, she graduated from Williams College in 1977 with a degree in art history. She later served on the Williams College Board of Trustees from 2012 to 2024.

Raised Methodist, Williamson later became a born again Christian; as of a 1996 Los Angeles Times interview, she attended a Baptist church in Pasadena, California. In the same profile, she rejected characterizations of her work, particularly Promised Land, as ideologically conservative, saying "Why should family programming suddenly be the sole property of the Christian Coalition or the silent majority or whatever? [...] Jesus was the most liberal guy you'd ever meet, you know?"

In 1998, Williamson married Jon Andersen. The couple adopted two daughters from China.

== Television series ==
Series/Title Name	Title	Network	Years
Young Sheldon	Consulting producer	CBS	2018–2019
Signed, Sealed, Delivered	Creator, Executive Producer, Writer	Hallmark Channel/Hallmark Movies & Mysteries	2013–
Touched by an Angel	Executive Producer, Writer	CBS/CBSP	1994–2003
Promised Land	Creator, Executive Producer, Writer	CBS/Paramount	1996–1999
Under One Roof	Co-Executive Producer	CBS	1994
Jack's Place	Supervising Producer, Writer	ABC/ABCP	1992–1993
Secret Adventures: Snap	Writer	Taweel-Loos	1993
McGee and Me!	Writer	Taweel-Loos	1991–1992
Fish Police	Supervising Producer	CBS	1991
The Family Man	Supervising Producer, Writer	CBS	1990–1991
Living Dolls	Supervising Producer, Writer	ABC	1989–1990
Raising Miranda	Producer	CBS/GTG	1988–1989
The Facts of Life	Story Editor, Writer	NBC/Columbia	1985–1988

== Books ==
Title	Publisher	Date Published
In the Words of Angels	Fireside	2000
Inviting God to Your Wedding	Harmony	2000
When Angels Speak	Fireside	1997
True Stories of Touched by an Angel	Zondervan	1997
Raging Hormones	Doubleday	1990

== Soundtracks ==
Soundtrack Title	Title	Label	Year
Touched by an Angel: The Album	Executive Producer	Sony Music	1998
Touched by an Angel: Christmas Album	Executive Producer	Sony Music	1999

== Awards ==
Award	Date
President's Council on Service and Civic Participation	2003
Steve Allen Award for Entertainment Excellence	2001
NAACP Image Award	2000
Salvation Army Awards	1999
Good Samaritan Institute Award	1999
Governor's Award of Excellence	1999
Family Program Award	1999
Imagen Awards	1999
Golden Globes – 2 nominations	1999
Gabriel Award	1998
Voices of Hope Award from Herbert G. Birch	1998
Hollywood Impact Award	1998
Induction of Touched by an Angel into Museum of TV and Radio	1998
Gabriel Award	1998
Epiphany Prize (The Templeton Foundation)	1997
Christopher Award	1997
Edward R. Murrow Responsibility in Television	1997
H.E.L.P Group Spirit of Hope Award	1997
Freedom Works Award from United States Congress	1997
Emmy Awards (A.T.A.S) – 5 nominations	1997
Johnson & Johnson Safe Kids Award	1997
Daughters of the American Revolution Award	1997
Producers' Guild of America Nova Award	1997
Gabriel Award	1996
Catholics in Media Associates Award	1996
Anti Defamation League's Deborah Award	1996
Covenant Awards	1996
Excellence in Media Awards	1995
Swiss American Faith and Values Award	1995
