= Touched by an Angel =

American drama television series (1994–2003)

- Genre: Fantasy; Drama
- Created by: John Masius
- Showrunner: Martha Williamson
- Starring: Roma Downey; Della Reese; John Dye; Valerie Bertinelli
- Theme music composer: Marc Lichtman
- Opening theme: "Walk with You"; Performed by Della Reese
- Country of origin: United States
- Original language: English
- No. of seasons: 9
- No. of episodes: 211 (list of episodes)

Production
- Executive producers: Martha Williamson; Burt Pearl; Jon Andersen
- Producers: R.J. Colleary; Burt Pearl; Jon Andersen; Robert Visciglia Jr.
- Production locations: Salt Lake City, Utah
- Running time: 48 minutes
- Production companies: Moon Water Productions; CBS Entertainment Productions (1994–1995) (seasons 1–2); CBS Productions (1995–2003) (seasons 2–9)

Original release
- Network: CBS
- Release: September 21, 1994 – April 27, 2003

Related
- Promised Land

Touched by an Angel is an American drama television series that premiered on CBS on September 21, 1994, and ran for 211 episodes over nine seasons until its conclusion on April 27, 2003. Created by John Masius and executive produced by Martha Williamson, the series stars Roma Downey as an angel named Monica, and Della Reese as her supervisor Tess. Throughout the series, Monica is tasked with bringing guidance and messages from God to various people who are at a crossroads in their lives. From season three onward, they are frequently joined by Andrew (John Dye), the Angel of Death (who first appeared as a recurring character in season two).

== Plot ==
The episodes of the series generally revolve around the "cases" of Monica (Roma Downey), an Angel recently promoted from the "search and rescue" division, who works under the guidance of Tess (Della Reese), a sarcastic boss who is sometimes hard on her junior colleague, but is more of a surrogate mother than a supervisor.

Monica in one episode outlines that she started in the choir, then annunciations, followed by search and rescue and then case work. Most cases involve a single person or a group of people who are at a crossroads in their lives and facing a large problem or tough decision. Monica and Tess bring them messages of hope from God and give them guidance to help make decisions. During their first episode, the pair receive a red 1972 Cadillac Eldorado convertible as a gift; they use it for transportation throughout the rest of the series while in the human world, with Tess doing the driving. As the series progresses, Monica continues gaining experience as a case worker and, during some cases must learn lessons of her own.

During the series pilot, an angel of death named Adam is introduced. In the season two premiere, "Interview with an Angel", a new Angel of Death named Henry is introduced. Then in the season two episode entitled "The One That Got Away", Andrew (played by John Dye) is introduced as the Angel of Death. Initially a recurring character, he becomes a main character in season three, making him the permanent Angel of Death for the remainder of the series. The original angel of death, Adam, continued to appear in guest appearances over the next few seasons.

In Season 4, a new angel is introduced named Rafael (Alexis Cruz), who appears throughout the series on a recurring basis, often assisting the main trio (Monica, Tess, and Andrew) in their cases. Rafael is a younger looking angel than the others and thus is occasionally involved in situations involving teenagers and young adults so they can relate to each other. Towards the end of the seventh season, a new angel, Gloria (Valerie Bertinelli), is created by God during one of Monica's assignments, designed to adapt to life on Earth in the 21st century. She becomes a regular character for seasons eight and nine, as a trainee under Monica and Tess's guidance.

In the series finale, Monica is up for promotion to supervisor, pending the outcome of a difficult case in which she must defend Zach (Scott Bairstow), an innocent drifter accused of causing a boiler explosion at a school two years ago in the small town of Ascension, Colorado. The explosion killed most of the children, leaving the citizens devastated. During the case, Monica sees many familiar faces, including Joey Machulis (Paul Wittenburg), one of Monica's previous assignments, who is a witness to the events; his brother Wayne (Randy Travis), who is now sheriff; Sophie (Marion Ross), a formerly homeless acquaintance; and Mike (Patrick Duffy), a lawyer Monica saved during her search and rescue days, who is now the mayor. An out-of-town developer claims Zach is the perpetrator, and despite the lack of evidence, Zach is put on trial. Monica does all she can to help him, including asking Mike to represent him, but the prosecutor in the case, Jones, is really Satan in disguise, and Zach is eventually convicted.

After the trial, Monica is able to help the citizens realize their mistake and to see that Zach's return to the town had helped them finally start living again. They begin going back to church, welcomed by the pastor they had once abandoned. Their change of heart, however, cannot free Zach, so Monica visits him in jail and reveals that she is an angel. She then promises him that she will become his guardian angel, forgoing all future assignments and the coveted promotion, to protect him from harm in prison. When she returns in the morning, however, the cell is empty. The citizens decide not to search for him, and it is revealed that Joey inadvertently caused the explosion after the devil tricked him into turning the boiler too high to warm some kittens he'd found.

The perplexed Monica returns to the desert to find Tess and Zach. There, she learns that Zach was actually God, and that her defending him was a test, which she passed by being willing to sacrifice herself for him. Monica is promoted to supervisor. As she leaves, she says her goodbyes to Gloria, and to Andrew, who gives her a pocket watch to remember their friendship. Before parting, Tess gives Monica the keys to the Cadillac, as she is leaving her job to sit at God's feet. Monica is last shown driving away as the camera pans out over the desert.

== Episodes ==
Season	Episodes	Originally released		Rank	Rating
Season	Episodes	First released	Last released	Rank	Rating
1	11	September 21, 1994	March 4, 1995	81	8.9
2	24	September 23, 1995	May 18, 1996	34	11.1
3	28	September 15, 1996	May 18, 1997	10	13.6
4	27	September 21, 1997	May 17, 1998	6	14.2
5	26	September 20, 1998	May 23, 1999	8	13.1
6	26	September 26, 1999	May 21, 2000	10	11.6
7	25	October 15, 2000	May 20, 2001	22	9.7
8	22	September 29, 2001	May 11, 2002	68	TBA
9	22	September 28, 2002	April 27, 2003	88	5.1

== Cast and characters ==
=== Main ===
- Roma Downey as Monica, a kind-hearted Irish angel prone to getting in trouble, who is sent town-to-town to encourage people. She appears in all but two episodes.
- Della Reese as Tess, Monica's tough but loving supervisor. She acts like Monica's mother, often addressing her as "angel girl" or "Miss Wings". She appears in all but three episodes.
- John Dye as Andrew (main, seasons 3–9; recurring, season 2), an angel of death.
- Valerie Bertinelli as Gloria (main, seasons 8–9; guest, season 7), an intelligent but naïve and accident-prone Italian American angel made to understand the way of life in the early 21st century.

=== Recurring ===
- Alexis Cruz as Rafael, an angel
- Ossie Davis as Erasmus Jones and Gabriel, an archangel
- Jasmine Guy as Kathleen, a fallen angel
- Celeste Holm as Hattie Greene
- Wynonna Judd as Audrey Carmichael
- Eddie Karr as Nathaniel Greene
- Cloris Leachman as Ruth, an archangel
- Gerald McRaney as Russell Greene and Dr. Joe Patcherik
- Wendy Phillips as Claire Greene and Ruth Ann Russell
- Charles Rocket as Adam, an angel of death
- Marion Ross as Sophie and Emma
- Randy Travis as Wayne Machulis and Jed Winslow
- Paul Winfield as Sam, an archangel and Andrew's supervisor
- Paul Wittenburg as Joey Machulis

=== Notable guest stars ===
The series featured hundreds of guest stars during its run. Those who played other angels or demons included:

- Bruce Altman as Henry, an angel of death (season 2, episodes 1 & 4)
- Chris Burke as Taylor, an angel (season 3, episode 26; season 4, episode 2)
- Bill Cosby as Phil, the angel of restoration (season 3, episode 27; season 5, episode 17)
- Olympia Dukakis as the music angel Clara in "A Joyful Noise" (Season 3 Episode 1)
- Keb' Mo' as the angel of music (season 3, episode 27; season 9, episode 9), Isaac (season 6, episode 9),
  and J.D. Winslow (season 7, episodes 24–25)
- Mandy Patinkin as Satan (season 7, episode 23)
- John Schneider as Frank Littleton/Satan (season 2, episode 6) and Joshua Winslow (season 7, episodes 24–25)
- David Ogden Stiers as Jones/Satan (season 9, episodes 21–22)

Musicians and other non-actors who guest starred included:

- Maya Angelou (season 2, episode 7)
- Charlotte Church (season 6, episode 7)
- Natalie Cole (season 2, episode 7)
- Bill Gaither (season 7, episode 24)
- Faith Hill (season 4, episode 1)
- Kathy Ireland (season 6, episode 3)
- Wynonna Judd (season 5, episode 9)
- Naomi Judd (season 6, episode 25)
- Tara Lipinski (season 5, episode 15)
- Jo Dee Messina (season 6, episode 9; season 9, episode 7)
- NSYNC (season 6, episode 7)
- Renee Olstead (season 4, episode 15)
- Sally Jessy Raphael (season 2, episode 22)
- Kenny Rogers (season 6, episode 14)
- Kerri Strug (season 3, episode 28)
- Luther Vandross (season 8, episode 20)
- Montel Williams (season 5, episode 20)
- Daryle Singletary (season 2, episode 3)

As themselves:

- Hank Aaron (season 8, episode 2)
- Muhammad Ali (season 5, episode 24)
- Nadia Comaneci (season 3, episode 28)
- Celine Dion (season 5, episode 9)
- Dr. John (season 2, episode 15)
- Al Hirt (season 2, episode 15)
- Al Jarreau (season 2, episode 15)
- Toby Keith (season 8, episode 7)
- B. B. King (season 2, episode 15)
- Rosa Parks (season 5, episode 23)
- Plus One (season 7, episode 20)
- Sally Ride (season 5, episode 26)

The show also featured early appearances by many actors who later achieved greater fame, including:

- Jack Black
- Bryan Cranston
- Kirsten Dunst
- America Ferrera
- Alyson Hannigan
- Shia LaBeouf
- Brie Larson
- Justina Machado
- Hayden Panettiere
- Pedro Pascal
- Zachary Quinto
- Jacob Tierney

=== Canadian broadcast ===
In 1994, CBC Television picked up the show but 2 years later it did move to CTV Television Network. In 2001, the show in Canada was moved again on Global Television Network.

== Production ==
Touched by an Angel was produced by CBS and Moon Water Productions. The network had wanted to do a series about angels after reading a story in Newsweek about how belief in angels was becoming popular. Critic Harold Bloom, among others, noted a cultural awareness of angels around those years that began in 1990 with Sophy Burnham's international bestseller A Book of Angels, and continued with Tony Kushner's 1993 Pulitzer Prize-winning play Angels in America, among many other cultural touchstones.

Most episodes of the series were produced in Salt Lake City, Utah. According to New York Times reviewer Caryn James, John Masius created the first pilot episode for the series, but it was a darker, less hopeful story than the producers wanted. It cost the studio $2 million to produce the episode. Masius wrote the show as a reflection of his spiritual anger at the time due to his two children being born disabled. Martha Williamson was approached to be the series executive producer in early 1994. She described the pilot she received as "upsetting" as it "portrayed angels as recycled dead people with power over life and death." She initially declined the position, but during a lunch with Andy Hill, then President of CBS, she mentioned the show and suggested he find a producer who would create a show with "loving, joyful" angels that the audience would have to believe in.

Williamson stated that she could not stop thinking about the show after that meeting, and eventually called to ask if the position was still open. Though getting the position was no longer a sure thing, she passed up a more lucrative position directing a court drama and went in for an interview with CBS in June 1994. During her interview, she states she emphasized that she was a Christian and could only do a show that depicted angels in a way she felt was true to her view of angels and that was respectful towards God. She also indicated that the pilot should be redone from the beginning, keeping only the characters Monica and Tess, reworked. The studio agreed with her remarks and hired her. Williamson herself wrote a new script for the pilot episode, while also working on hiring the remaining staff for the series, which was due to premiere in September. The pilot was filmed in Salt Lake City and the show was ready on schedule. The first episode aired on September 14, 1994.

=== Theme song ===
The show's theme song, "Walk with You", was sung by Della Reese with a gospel choir. An extended version appeared on the series soundtrack.

=== Spin-off ===
In 1996, Promised Land was launched as a spin-off series, following the Greene family whom Monica had met during one of her cases, as they travel the United States helping those in need. Four crossover episodes aired during Promised Land's three-season run.

== Broadcast and syndication ==
The series went into syndication in 1998, and has aired on PAX-TV, Hallmark Channel, CBS Drama, Up, MeTV and Start TV. It has also aired on Hallmark Drama (now Hallmark Family).

=== Chain email hoax ===
In 1999, a chain email emerged that falsely claimed that atheism activist Madalyn Murray O'Hair (who died in 1995) was circulating a petition for the Federal Communications Commission to ban all religiously themed radio and television shows, including Touched by an Angel. The email claims the petition has the ID number 2493, and calls on readers to write to the FCC to express their objections to it. The hoax was modeled on a chain email from 1996, and variations persisted into the 2000s, with different programs mentioned and different individuals supposedly leading the effort. In reality, the referenced petition (RM 2493) sought to prevent religious organizations from receiving licenses to broadcast on educational channels, it did not demand a ban on all religious programming, O'Hair was not affiliated with it, and it was rejected by the FCC in 1975.

== Home media ==
Paramount Home Entertainment has released all nine seasons on DVD in Region 1. Seasons 1, 2, 5–9 were released as single season box sets, while seasons 3 & 4 were released as two volume sets.

On February 9, 2016, Paramount Home Entertainment released Touched by an Angel: The Complete Series on DVD in Region 1.

Four themed sets, each containing four episodes, have also been released. The first two, "The Inspiration Collection: Holiday" and "The Inspiration Collection: Hope" were released on November 10, 2009; "The Inspiration Collection: Faith" and "The Inspiration Collection: Love" were released January 26, 2010.

In Region 4, Shock Records has released five volumes of episodes from the series, each containing nine episodes and a set containing all five volumes together.

DVD name	Ep #	Release date
The Complete First Season	13	August 31, 2004
The Second Season	22	May 3, 2005
The Third Season, Volume 1	16	February 7, 2006
The Third Season, Volume 2	13	November 28, 2006
The Fourth Season, Volume 1	13	March 27, 2007
The Fourth Season, Volume 2	14	December 4, 2007
The Fifth Season	26	July 24, 2012
The Sixth Season	26	September 25, 2012
The Seventh Season	25	April 23, 2013
The Eighth Season	22	July 30, 2013
The Ninth and Final Season	22	November 19, 2013
The Complete Series	211	February 9, 2016

== Reception ==
=== Critical ===
Throughout its run, Touched by an Angel received largely negative reviews from critics, who derided its use of treacly melodrama. Tom Shales of The Washington Post wrote: "viewers with low tolerance for precious whimsy will probably find they have overdosed on pixie dust within the first 10 minutes". Michael Blowen of The Boston Globe wrote, "If you loved Michael Landon's 'Highway to Heaven', a show pooh-poohed by the critics that became a huge hit, you'll probably go for this sugary, maudlin, sentimental myth-making." David Zurawik of The Baltimore Sun opined it was "the worst new series of the TV season [...] there's absolutely nothing divine about it." Commenting on frequent shots of Monica's bare feet in the first episode, Zurawik wrote, "I'm not sure what that's all about unless CBS has research showing a large audience of foot fetishists waiting for a reason not to watch ABC's Roseanne."

In a retrospective piece titled "Mauled by an Angel" for his column Religion Dispatches, W. Scott Poole stated that Downey and Reese "served up a syrupy but powerful advertisement for a greeting-card brand of religious faith with little theological definition, but a healthy serving of 'chicken soup for the soul' (a franchise that itself became popular in the same era)." He added the show "seemed to suggest that God was deeply concerned but mostly unable or unwilling to get directly involved, sending along his messengers to patch things up for humanity (or select portions of it) now and again." Writing of the first season, Ken Tucker of Entertainment Weekly gave the show a "C" grade, and said the show "succeeds in being so unpretentiously, innocently pure-minded—this is the Forrest Gump of fall '94—that it's possible to feel sympathy for its ratings plight." Common Sense Media reviewer Emily Ashby gave the series 3 out of 5 stars, and said that "this uplifting, inspirational show is steeped in strong moral messages, life lessons, and Christian overtones that include multiple references to 'God,' 'Lord,' and the 'Father.'"

=== Ratings ===
Touched by an Angel became one of CBS's highest-rated series during season three and continued through season six, when it was the ninth most watched network series, with 17,190,000 viewers that amounted to a 15% share of the market as determined by Nielsen Media Research. In season eight, after the series moved from its Sunday time slot to a Saturday one, it dropped to 79th place, with 8.3 million viewers.

Season		Episodes	Time slot (ET)	Season premiere	Season finale	Season rank	Viewers (in millions)
1	1994–1995	11	Wednesday at 9:00 pm (Episodes 1–8); Sunday at 8:00 pm (Episode 9); Saturday at 9:00 pm (Episodes 10–11)	September 21, 1994	March 4, 1995	#78	8.90
2	1995–1996	24	Saturday at 9:00 pm	September 23, 1995	May 18, 1996	#34	11.10
3	1996–1997	28	Sunday at 8:00 pm	September 15, 1996	May 18, 1997	#10	13.19
4	1997–1998	27	Sunday at 8:00 pm (Episodes 1-25); Sunday at 9:00 pm (Episode 26)	September 21, 1997	May 17, 1998	#5	21.80
5	1998–1999	26	Sunday at 8:00 pm	September 20, 1998	May 23, 1999	#6	19.50
6	1999–2000	26	Sunday at 8:00 pm	September 26, 1999	May 21, 2000	#9	17.19
7	2000–2001	25	Sunday at 8:00 pm	October 15, 2000	May 20, 2001	#25	14.00
8	2001–2002	22	Saturday at 8:00 pm (Episodes 1–10, 12–20, 22); Sunday at 8:00 pm (Episodes 11, 21)	September 29, 2001	May 11, 2002	#79	8.30
9	2002–2003	22	Saturday at 8:00 pm (Episodes 1-21); Sunday at 8:00 pm (Episode 22)	September 28, 2002	April 27, 2003	#91	7.60

=== Awards ===
The series was nominated for eleven Primetime Emmy Awards between 1997 and 2000, including two nominations each for Downey and Reese in the Outstanding Lead Actress in a Drama Series and Outstanding Supporting Actress in a Drama Series categories, respectively. It was also nominated for three Golden Globe Awards, two in 1998 and 1999 for Downey for Best Performance by an Actress in a TV-Series - Drama, and one in 1998 for Reese for Best Performance by an Actress in a Supporting Role in a Series even though the series was never able to secure either award. Marc Lichtman was awarded five BMI Film and Television Awards for "Television Music" in 1997, 1998, 1999, 2000, and 2001 for his work as the series composer.

=== In popular culture ===
Maria Bamford imitated Monica on the track "Touched by an Angel" on her Burning Tours album.

It was also spoofed on MadTV as "Touched by an Atheist" on an episode guest starring comedian George Carlin.

It was also spoofed on the Family Guy episode "Ready, Willing and Disabled".

Weird Al Yankovic's take on Eminem's "Lose Yourself", called "Couch Potato", changed the title to Touched by an Uncle.

The theme song and intro were parodied in the Birdgirl episode "Thirdgirl".

== In other media ==
A book on the series, Touched by an Angel, was published by Zondervan in November 1997. Written by Williamson and Robin Sheets, it contains background information on some of the stories featured, series production information, basic details on the first fifty episodes and profiles of Downey, Reese and Dye. It also has short story versions of four episodes: "Interview with an Angel", "There, but for the Grace of God", "An Unexpected Snow" and "Jacob's Ladder". A second book, In the Words of Angels: Twenty Inspiring Stories from Touched by an Angel, was published by Fireside Books on August 28, 2001. Also written by Williamson, it collects twenty short stories based on episodes from the series.

An audio soundtrack, Touched by an Angel: The Album, was released on November 3, 1998. The 15-track CD includes a full-length version of the series theme song, "Walk with You", performed by Della Reese and songs by Céline Dion, Shawn Colvin, Bob Dylan, Faith Hill, Martina McBride, Amy Grant, Jaci Velasquez, The Kinleys, Wynonna and Amanda Marshall. The soundtrack went platinum. A second album, Touched by an Angel: Christmas Album, was released on November 9, 1999, with 13 tracks of Christmas music. In addition to having tracks performed by Reese and Downey, it features songs from Randy Travis, Keb' Mo', Charlotte Church, Kirk Franklin, Collin Raye, Amy Grant and Donna Summer. Both albums were released by Sony Music Entertainment, the successor to the former record division of CBS.

== See also ==
- List of films about angels
- Highway to Heaven (1984–1989), similar concept
- Heaven Help Us (1994)
- God Friended Me (2018–2020), similar concept
- Heaven Can Wait (1978 film)
