= R.J. Colleary =

American screenwriter (born 1957)

R.J. "Bob" Colleary
- Born: Robert John Colleary; August 26, 1957 (age 69); Montclair, New Jersey, U.S.
- Occupations: American television writer and producer
- Years active: 1979–present
- Website: Facebook page

R.J. "Bob" Colleary (born August 26, 1957 in Montclair, New Jersey) is an American television producer and writer. He won the 1980 Primetime Emmy Award for his television writing for his work on Barney Miller.

Television series for which he wrote included Touched by an Angel, Promised Land, The Hogan Family, Saved by the Bell, The Facts of Life, Night Court, It's a Living, The Golden Girls, Benson, Gimme a Break!, Love, Sidney, M*A*S*H, Barney Miller, A.E.S. Hudson Street, and The Fairly OddParents.
