= Top-rated United States television programs of 2012–13 =

This table displays the top-rated primetime television series of the 2012–13 season as measured by Nielsen Media Research.

Rank	Program	Network	Rating
1	NCIS	CBS	13.5
2	Sunday Night Football	NBC	12.4
3	The Big Bang Theory	CBS	11.6
4	NCIS: Los Angeles	CBS	11.0
5	Person of Interest	CBS	10.0
6	Dancing with the Stars	ABC	9.9
7	American Idol — Wednesday	FOX	9.2
7	Dancing with the Stars — Results	ABC	9.2
9	American Idol — Thursday	FOX	8.9
10	Two and a Half Men	CBS	8.7
10	The Voice	NBC	8.7
12	Blue Bloods	CBS	8.5
13	The Voice — Tuesday	NBC	8.4
14	Elementary	CBS	8.3
15	Castle	ABC	8.1
16	60 Minutes	CBS	8.0
16	Criminal Minds	CBS	8.0
18	CSI: Crime Scene Investigation	CBS	7.7
18	Grey's Anatomy	ABC	7.7
18	The Mentalist	CBS	7.7
18	Modern Family	ABC	7.7
18	Vegas	CBS	7.7
23	Body of Proof	ABC	7.3
23	CSI: NY	CBS	7.3
23	The Following	FOX	7.3
23	The Good Wife	CBS	7.3
23	Survivor: Philippines	CBS	7.3
28	2 Broke Girls	CBS	6.8
28	Hawaii Five-0	CBS	6.8
30	Survivor: Caramoan	CBS	6.7
