= All Because of You =

All Because of You may refer to:

- All Because of You (film) or Pasal Kau!, a 2020 Malaysian romantic comedy film

== Albums ==
- All Because of You (Daryle Singletary album) (1996)
- All Because of You (Lisa Whelchel album) (1984)
- All Because of You, a 1994 album by Lisa Bevill

== Songs ==
- "All Because of You" (Marques Houston song) (2005)
- "All Because of You" (U2 song) (2005)
- "All Because of You" (Puffy song) (2008)
- "All Because of You", by Geordie from Hope You Like It (1973)
- "All Because of You", by Barry White from Just Another Way to Say I Love You (1975)
- "All Because of You", by Karen Carpenter from Karen Carpenter (1996)
- "All Because of You", by Blackmore's Night from Fires at Midnight (2001)
- "All Because of You", by Celine Dion from A New Day Has Come (2002)
- "All Because of You", by Saliva from Back into Your System (2002)
- "All Because of You", by Sunrise Avenue from On the Way to Wonderland (2006)
- "All Because of You", by Julia Volkova (2011)

== See also ==
- Because of You (disambiguation)
