= Because of You =

Because of You may refer to:

== Music ==
=== Albums ===
- Because of You (James Darren album), 2001
- Because of You (Ne-Yo album), 2007, and the title song (see below)
- Because of You (Tony Bennett album), 1952, and the title song, a cover of the popular song (see below)
- Neo Ttaemun-e (Because of You), a 2010 EP by After School, and the title song (see below)
- Because of You, a 1993 compilation album by Dexys Midnight Runners, and the title song (see below)
- Because of You, a 2003 album by The Kings
- Because of You, a 1998 album by Preservation Hall Jazz Band

=== Songs ===
- "Because of You" (1940 song), a popular song by Arthur Hammerstein and Dudley Wilkinson, recorded by Tony Bennett and others
- "Because of You" (98 Degrees song), 1998
- "Because of You" (After School song)
- "Because of You" (The Cover Girls song)
- "Because of You" (Gabrielle song), 1994
- "Because of You" (Gustaph song), 2023
- "Because of You" (Kelly Clarkson song), 2005, also recorded as a duet with Reba McEntire
- "Because of You" (Marques Houston song)
- "Because of You" (Ne-Yo song), 2007
- "Because of You" (Nickelback song), 2004
- "Because of You", by 54-40 from Show Me
- "Because of You", by Arthur Hammerstein and Dudley Wilkinson, recorded by Connie Francis from One for the Boys
- "Because of You", by Ayumi Hamasaki from Memorial Address
- "Because of You", by Band of Susans from Love Agenda
- "Because of You", by Billie Piper from Walk of Life
- "Because of You", by Billy Ocean from Tear Down These Walls
- "Because of You", by Bobby Vinton from Bobby Vinton Sings the Big Ones
- "Because of You", by Dexys Midnight Runners, the theme for the 1986–1991 British sitcom Brush Strokes
- "Because of You", by DJ BoBo
- "Because of You", by Gene Clark from White Light
- "Because of You", by Jolin Tsai from 1019
- "Because of You", by Keith Martin from Love of My Life
- "Because of You", by Kyla from Not Your Ordinary Girl
- "Because of You", by Kym Marsh from Standing Tall
- "Because of You", by Letters to Cleo from Go!
- "Because of You", by Meat Loaf from Couldn't Have Said It Better
- "Because of You", by Skunk Anansie from Smashes and Trashes
- "Because of You", by Sleeper from Pleased to Meet You
- "Because of You", by Stephanie
- "Because of You", by Unwritten Law from Here's to the Mourning

== Film and television ==
- Because of You (1952 film), an American film noir directed by Joseph Pevney
- Because of You (2000 film), a Japanese film by Ryū Murakami, based on his novel Kyoko
- Bcuz of U, a 2004 Filipino romantic anthology film
- Because of You (Philippine TV series), a 2015–2016 drama series
- Because of You (Taiwanese TV series), a 2020 series directed by Zero Chou

== Other uses ==
- Because of You..., perfume

== See also ==
- All Because of You (disambiguation)
