= Michael Skupin =

American television personality (born 1962)

- Born: Michael David Skupin; January 29, 1962 (age 64); Farmington Hills, Michigan, U.S.
- Other name: Michael Landry
- Education: Western Michigan University (B.B.A.)
- Occupations: Software publisher, television personality, copier salesperson
- Television: Survivor: The Australian Outback; Survivor: Philippines (Co-runner-up)
- Children: 7
- Convictions: November 18, 2016 (jury trial, possession of child pornography); November 21, 2016 (no contest plea, larceny by conversion)
- Criminal charges: Possession of child pornography, larceny by conversion
- Penalty: One to four years in prison, four years' probation, $31,800 restitution

Michael David Skupin (/ˈskuːpɪn/; born January 29, 1962) is a convicted fraudster and child sex offender. Best known for competing on two seasons of the reality competition show Survivor, he became the first person to be medically evacuated from the game after falling into a fire on Survivor: The Australian Outback.

== Early life ==
Skupin was born January 29, 1962, in Farmington Hills, Michigan. When he was four, his father died of cancer. His mother, Mary Louise Skupin, went on to marry Clarence Landry when Michael was ten. Michael then took his stepfather's last name, though Clarence had never officially adopted him.

While in high school, Michael Landry became an athlete, playing tight end for the football team at Brother Rice High School in Birmingham. During his junior year, Landry was expelled for throwing water balloons at some students at a neighboring all-girls high school. For his senior year, he transferred to St. Mary's Preparatory in Orchard Lake where, even before his expulsion, he was offered a spot on their football team playing both tight end and linebacker.

After high school, Landry tried to enroll at Western Michigan University (WMU), but he was initially denied acceptance due to the fact that no Social Security number existed for a "Michael Landry." He reapplied to WMU under his birth name, Michael Skupin, and was later accepted. In 1984, Skupin graduated with a B.B.A. degree.

== Career ==
Skupin's first job after college was selling copiers for 3M. In 1992, he teamed up with a childhood friend, Greg Swan, to found Rhinosoft Interactive, a software company based out of Wisconsin. In 2000, Rhinosoft was involved in a controversy when some CD-ROM versions of the Bible, published by Skupin and Swan, were distributed into various boxes of cereal as part of a promotion by General Mills. The cereal company, which had been distributing computer games and dictionaries on CD-ROM as part of the same promotion, claimed that it was unaware of the presence of the Bible CD-ROMs. General Mills apologized for the move, stating that it was against company policy to "advance any particular set of religious beliefs," although Swan insisted that the company had indeed been aware of the disc-based Bibles all along.

Skupin, a Christian, is also the founder of Michael Skupin Ministries, which helps people combat addiction. He had also considered running for the United States Senate in 2002, but ultimately decided against it. In addition, he has written a book about his life, entitled Fireproof. The book was released in 2004.

== Survivor ==
=== The Australian Outback ===
In 2000, Skupin flew to Australia to film the second season of the TV series Survivor. He was one of 16 castaways competing for the $1 million prize and the title of Sole Survivor. Upon the start of the game, Skupin was placed on the Kucha tribe, and was almost immediately seen as the tribe's leader. At first, he disavowed the role of tribal leader, but later embraced being the tribe's main provider, catching fish for the tribe and even killing a wild pig for its meat.

On Day 17, Skupin was tending to a fire at camp, when he accidentally inhaled some of the fumes and passed out into the fire. Seconds later, he let out a scream, then ran frantically into the water as his hands were now burned severely. The medical team was called in, and they determined that his injuries were too severe to keep him in the game. He was then evacuated by helicopter to seek further medical treatment, making him the first Survivor player ever to be medically evacuated and the first to be eliminated from the game without having been voted off. Overall, he was the sixth contestant to exit the game, and finished in 11th place.

=== Philippines ===
In 2012, Skupin returned to Survivor for its 25th season. He was one of three previous medical evacuees returning to the game, along with Jonathan Penner (evacuated from Survivor: Micronesia) and Survivor: Samoa evacuee Russell Swan (no relation to Greg Swan, Skupin's friend and business partner). At the start, Skupin was assigned to the Tandang tribe. One of his tribemates was Lisa Whelchel, whom he recognized as one of the stars of the hit TV series The Facts of Life.

Initially, his alliance included fellow tribemates R.C. Saint-Amour, Pete Yurkowski, and Abi-Maria Gomes. No one in this alliance was eliminated prior to the merge, as Tandang did not lose one single tribal immunity challenge. After the merge, on Day 22, Skupin teamed up with Whelchel, and five days later, the two of them agreed to form a new alliance with Denise Stapley and Malcolm Freberg. At the Final Five Tribal Council, the four of them were planning on voting out Gomes, who repeatedly called Skupin a "moron" in an attempt to convince him to keep her as a sacrificial lamb, as her abrasive personality was perceived as easy to beat in a jury vote. Gomes was sent to the jury anyway, and at the Final Four immunity challenge, Skupin won immunity, and went on to join Whelchel and Stapley in voting out Freberg.

At the Final Tribal Council, Skupin was berated by the jury for his perceived strategic and social ineptitude. In particular, he was asked by Jeff Kent whether he was the type of person who makes things happen, watches things happen, or wonders what happened. In addition, Carter Williams asked Skupin to tell the jury why he had decided to vote Williams out. In the end, Skupin received only one jury vote, from Williams. Whelchel also received one vote, while Stapley won the title of Sole Survivor with six votes.

== Criminal background ==
On February 23, 2013, Skupin was arrested for driving on a suspended license, having an improper license plate, and lacking proof of insurance. His driver's license was revealed to have been suspended approximately 20 times dating back to 1999.

In December 2013, Rob Wolchek, an investigative reporter for WJBK in Detroit, inducted Skupin into his "Hall of Shame" for an alleged Ponzi scheme involving Skupin's financial business, called Pay It Forward. Wolchek alleged that Skupin never paid his investors any of the promised dividends.

On February 5, 2016, Skupin was arrested for his alleged role with Pay It Forward, being charged with five counts of larceny by conversion and one count of racketeering. Unrelated to these accusations, he was also charged with six counts of possession of child pornography, as such images, allegedly belonging to him, were discovered on his laptop while police were searching it during the Ponzi scheme investigation. Skupin's bond was set at US$350,000. On November 18, he was found guilty of four out of the six child pornography counts. A separate trial for his involvement with Pay It Forward took place November 21, during which he pleaded no contest to a single count of larceny by conversion, as part of a plea deal. He was sentenced to serve one to four years in prison for possession of child pornography, and four years' probation plus $31,800 in restitution for larceny. He was released on parole, on December 19, 2017, after serving a year in prison. His parole formally ended on January 3, 2021.

== Bibliography ==
- Skupin, Mike (2004). Fireproof. Green Key Books. ISBN 9781932587425.

Preceded by Sabrina Thompson	Runner-Up of Survivor; Survivor: Philippines	Succeeded by Dawn Meehan & Sherri Biethman
