= Collector's Call =

American television series

- Created by: Mike Schmiedeler
- Directed by: Mike Schmiedeler
- Presented by: Lisa Whelchel
- Country of origin: United States
- Original language: English
- No. of seasons: 7
- No. of episodes: 191

Production
- Running time: 22 minutes
- Production company: Weigel Production Corp.

Original release
- Network: MeTV
- Release: April 7, 2019 – present

Collector's Call is an American reality television series created by Mike Schmiedeler and hosted by Lisa Whelchel for MeTV that premiered on April 7, 2019. It is the first original series on the network.

== Premise ==
In the series, Whelchel presents collectors who have accumulated some of the largest collections of pop culture memorabilia in the country. These collections have items ranging range from locks of presidential hair to first editions of rare books.

During each collection, experts value the collectibles and try to entice the collectors with a trade, offering a coveted item that could be the perfect addition to their collections. The collector then has to make a decision to keep the current piece from their collection or to give it up for a new treasure.

== Production ==
In March 2019, it was announced that MeTV and its parent company Weigel Broadcasting would debut of the network’s first original series and was consisted of 13 episodes.

In May 2019, almost a month before the season finale, the series renewed the series for a second season consisting of 26 episodes, which premiered on January 12, 2020.

In March 2022 (after a two-year hiatus), the series was renewed for a third season consisting of 23 episodes, which premiered on March 27.

In July 2022, the series was renewed for a fourth season consisting of 26 episodes, which premiered on April 2, 2023.

In February 2024, the series was renewed for a fifth season consisting of 26 episodes, which premiered on April 7.

In September 2024 (ahead of the fifth season finale), the series was renewed for a sixth season consisting of 26 episodes, which premiered on April 6, 2025.

In March 2026, TV Insider exclusively announced that the series was renewed for a seventh season consisting of 26 episodes, which premiered on April 12.
