= Survivor: The Australian Outback =

- Season 2
- Region 1 DVD slipcase cover
- Presented by: Jeff Probst
- No. of days: 42
- No. of castaways: 16
- Winner: Tina Wesson
- Runner-up: Colby Donaldson
- Location: Goshen cattle station, Herbert River, Kirrama, Queensland, Australia
- No. of episodes: 16 (1 special)

Release
- Original network: CBS
- Original release: January 28 – May 3, 2001

Additional information
- Filming dates: October 23 – December 3, 2000

Season chronology
- ← Previous; Borneo Next → Africa

Survivor: The Australian Outback (commonly referred to as Survivor: Australia) is the second season of the American reality television series Survivor. Broadcast by CBS, it was originally shown between January 28 and May 23, 2001. Filming took place at Goshen cattle station, on the bank of the Herbert River in northern Queensland from October 23 through December 3, 2000. The show was hosted by Jeff Probst and featured 16 participants competing over 42 days. It was the first and only season to have more than 39 days of gameplay.

Tina Wesson was named the Sole Survivor, defeating Colby Donaldson by a jury vote of 4–3 and winning a prize of US$1,000,000. Wesson became the first female winner of the series. The series was generally well received, with many outlets considering it one of the best Survivor series. The opening episode premiered after Super Bowl XXXV to 43.5 million viewers.

== Format ==
Survivor is a reality television show created by Mark Burnett and Charlie Parsons and based on the Swedish show Expedition Robinson. The series follows a number of participants who are isolated in a remote location, where they must provide food, fire, and shelter for themselves. Every three days, one participant is removed from the series by majority vote, with challenges being held to give a reward (ranging from living and food-related prizes to a car) and immunity from being voted off the show. The last remaining player is awarded a prize of $1,000,000.

== Contestants ==
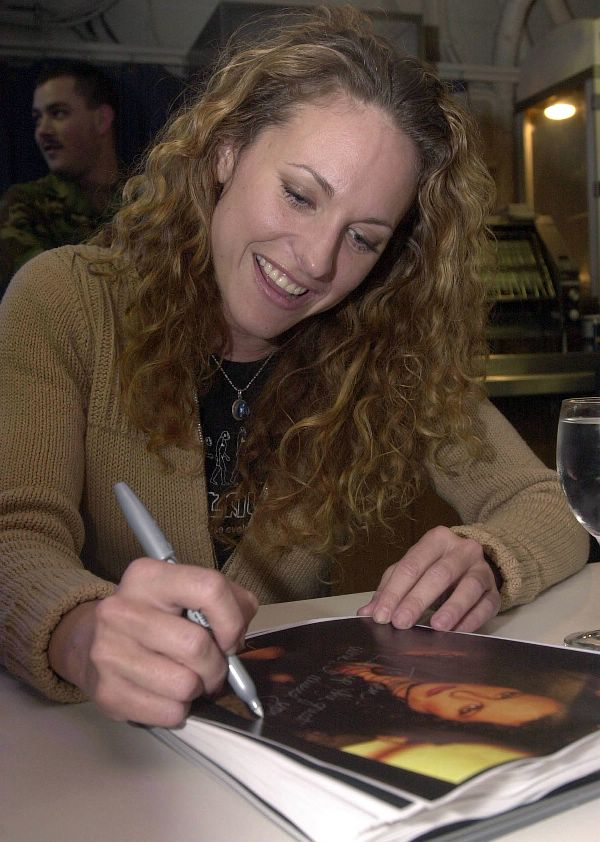
Jerri Manthey

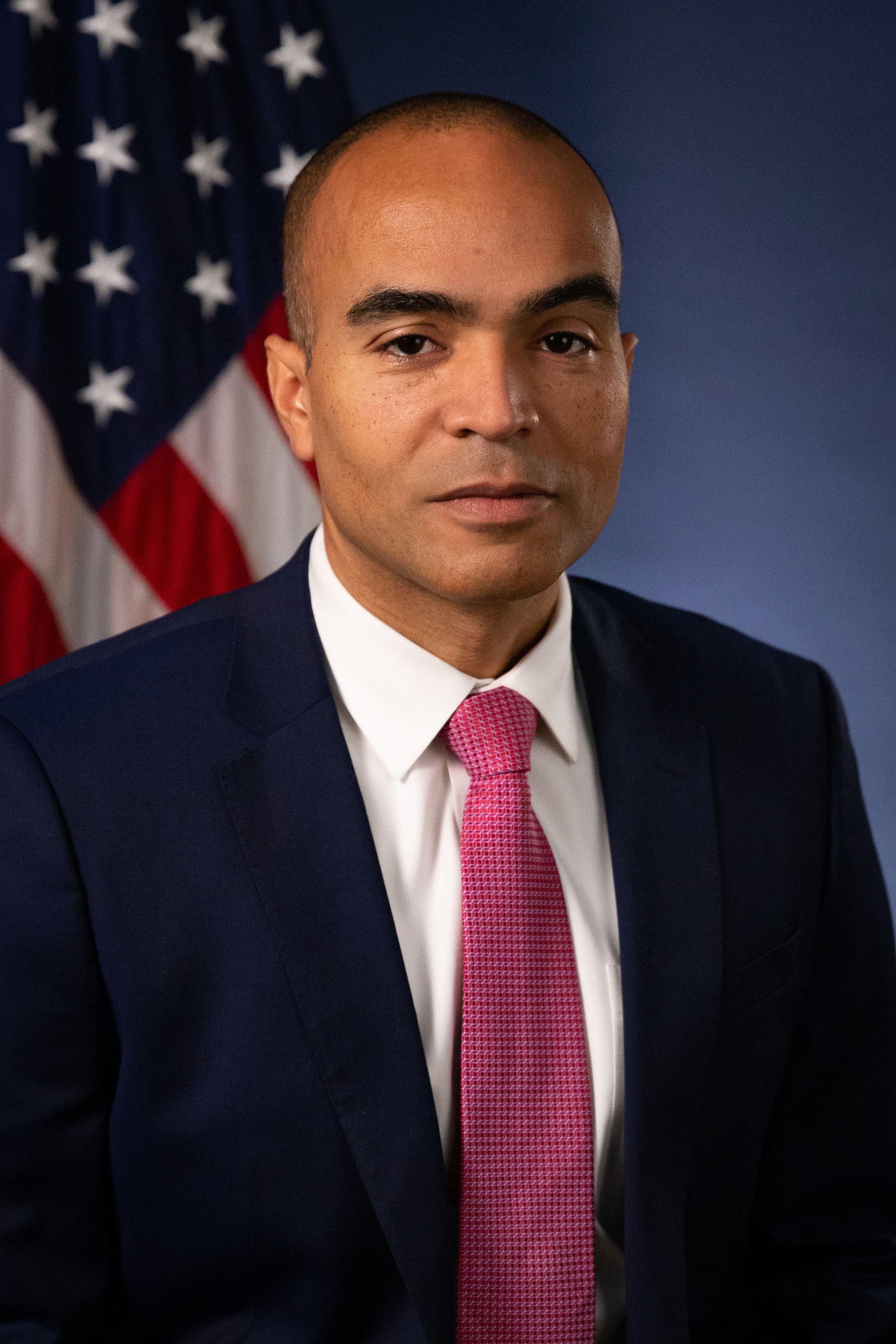
Nick Brown

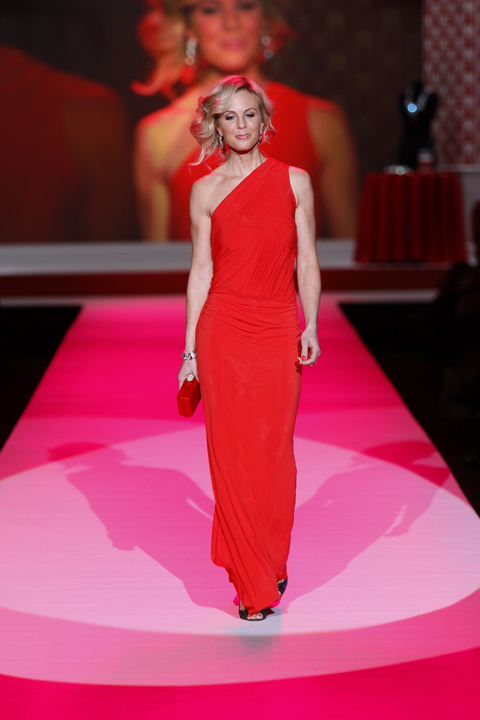
Elisabeth Filarski

The cast consisted of 16 contestants, who were initially separated into two tribes: Ogakor, named after the word for "crocodile" in the Kunjen language, and Kucha, named after the word for "kangaroo" in the Pakanha language. Midway through the season, the remaining ten players merged into a single "Barramundi" tribe, named after the river fish. The final seven eliminated contestants comprised the jury that decided who would be the winner.

List of Survivor: The Australian Outback contestants
Contestant	Age	From	Tribe		Finish	
Contestant	Age	From	Original	Merged	Placement	Day
Debb Eaton	45	Milan, New Hampshire	Kucha		1st voted out	Day 3
Kel Gleason	32	Fort Hood, Texas	Ogakor		2nd voted out	Day 6
Maralyn Hershey	51	Wakefield, Virginia	Ogakor		3rd voted out	Day 9
Mitchell Olson	23	Union City, New Jersey	Ogakor		4th voted out	Day 12
Kimmi Kappenberg	27	Ronkonkoma, New York	Kucha		5th voted out	Day 15
Michael Skupin	38	White Lake, Michigan	Kucha		Medically evacuated	Day 17
Jeff Varner	34	Manhattan, New York	Kucha	Barramundi	7th voted out	Day 21
Alicia Calaway	32	Manhattan, New York	Kucha	Barramundi	8th voted out 1st jury member	Day 24
Jerri Manthey	30	Los Angeles, California	Ogakor	Barramundi	9th voted out 2nd jury member	Day 27
Nick Brown	23	Steilacoom, Washington	Kucha	Barramundi	10th voted out 3rd jury member	Day 30
Amber Brkich	22	Beaver, Pennsylvania	Ogakor	Barramundi	11th voted out 4th jury member	Day 33
Rodger Bingham	53	Crittenden, Kentucky	Kucha	Barramundi	12th voted out 5th jury member	Day 36
Elisabeth Filarski	23	Newton, Massachusetts	Kucha	Barramundi	13th voted out 6th jury member	Day 39
Keith Famie	40	West Bloomfield, Michigan	Ogakor	Barramundi	14th voted out 7th jury member	Day 41
Colby Donaldson	26	Dallas, Texas	Ogakor	Barramundi	Runner-up	Day 42
Tina Wesson	40	Knoxville, Tennessee	Ogakor	Barramundi	Sole Survivor	Day 42

=== Future appearances ===
Tina Wesson, Colby Donaldson, Jerri Manthey, Alicia Calaway, and Amber Brkich returned to compete in Survivor: All-Stars. Donaldson and Manthey would again return for Survivor: Heroes vs. Villains. Michael Skupin returned in Survivor: Philippines, while Wesson would also appear on Survivor: Blood vs. Water along with her daughter, Katie Collins (who appeared in The Australian Outback as a loved one via video chat). Jeff Varner and Kimmi Kappenberg returned for Survivor: Cambodia, and Varner made his third Survivor appearance in Survivor: Game Changers. Brkich, under her married name Mariano, competed again in Survivor: Winners at War. Donaldson also competed on Survivor 50: In the Hands of the Fans.

Outside Survivor, Brkich competed on The Amazing Race 7 with her fiancé and fellow Survivor alumnus Rob Mariano. The couple then returned for The Amazing Race 11. Varner and Calaway made an appearance on Big Brother 2.

== Season summary ==
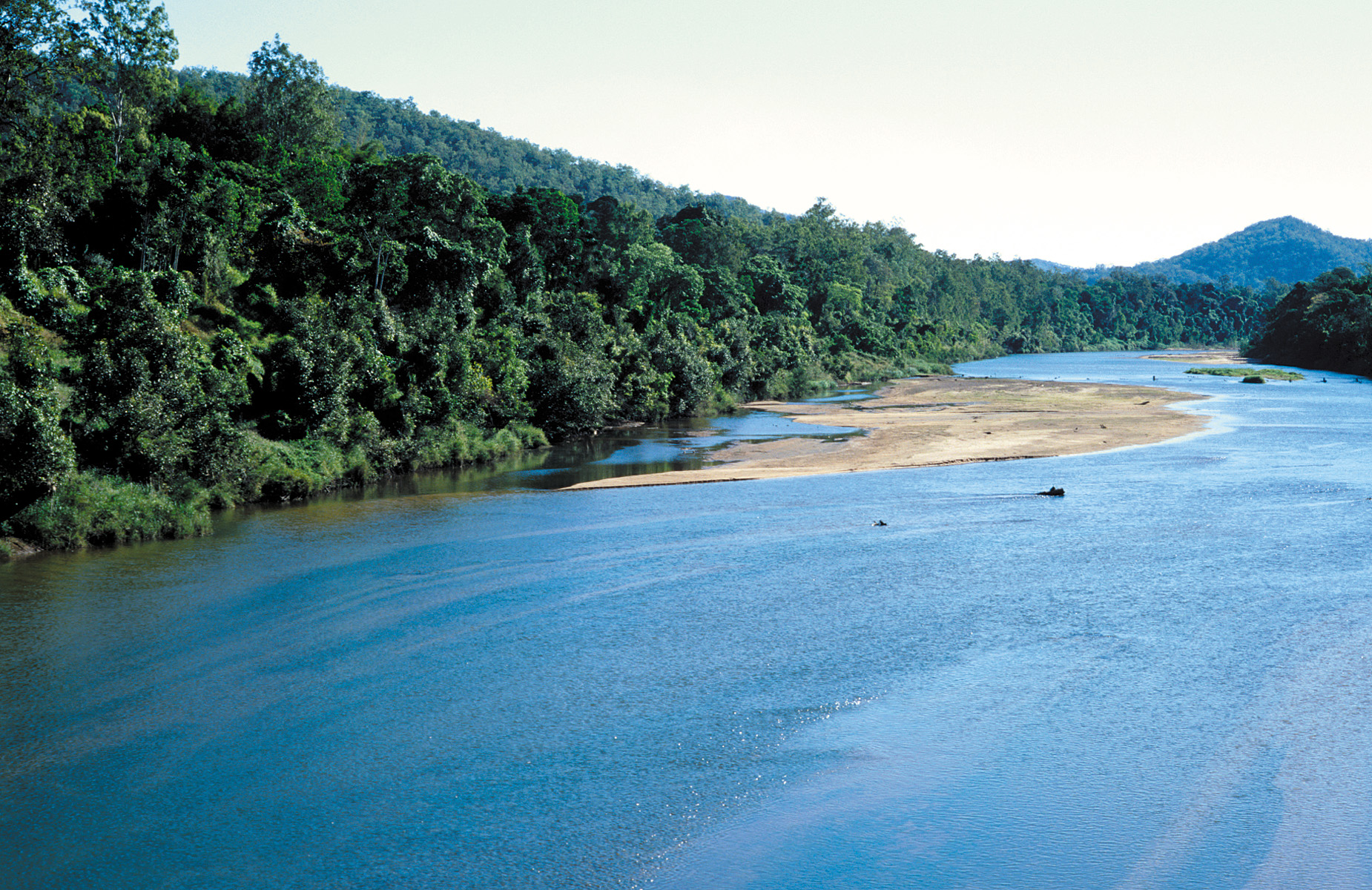
The season was filmed near the Herbert River in Queensland, Australia.

The sixteen contestants were divided into two tribes, Kucha and Ogakor, named after Aboriginal words for Kangaroo and Crocodile, respectively.

Although Ogakor fared significantly worse in challenges, the tribes remained even after Kucha member Michael suffered third-degree burns from a campfire and had to be medically evacuated.

The tribes entered the merge with 5 members apiece, naming the merged tribe Barramundi after a fish native to Australia. The first vote after the merge saw a tie, but Kucha member Jeff was eliminated due to previous votes being cast against him. Ogakor's majority alliance of Colby, Keith, and Tina alternated between eliminating former Kucha members and betraying former tribe-mates Jerri and Amber.

The three stayed together until the end of the game, and Colby took Tina with him into the final Tribal Council. Tina's strategic plan was valued over Colby's prowess in challenges, and she was awarded the title of Sole Survivor by a jury vote of 4–3.

Challenge winners and eliminations by episode
Episode			Challenge winner(s)		Eliminated	
No.	Title	Original air date	Reward	Immunity	Tribe	Player
1	"Stranded"	January 28, 2001	Ogakor		Kucha	Debb
2	"Suspicion"	February 1, 2001	Ogakor	Kucha	Ogakor	Kel
3	"Trust No One"	February 8, 2001	Ogakor	Kucha	Ogakor	Maralyn
4	"The Killing Fields"	February 15, 2001	Kucha		Ogakor	Mitchell
5	"The Gloves Come Off"	February 22, 2001	Kucha	Ogakor	Kucha	Kimmi
6	"Trial by Fire"	March 1, 2001	Kucha	None (Note: Due to Michael being medically evacuated from the game, there was no Immunity Challenge or Tribal Council vote.)	Kucha	Michael
7	"The Merge"	March 8, 2001	None (Note: There was no reward challenge due to the merge.)	Keith	Barramundi	Jeff
8	"Friends?"	March 14, 2001	Jerri [Amber]	Keith	Barramundi	Alicia
9	"The First 24 Days"	March 21, 2001	Recap Episode			
10	"Honeymoon or Not?"	March 29, 2001	Colby, Jerri	Nick	Barramundi	Jerri
11	"Let's Make a Deal"	April 5, 2001	Survivor Auction	Colby	Barramundi	Nick
12	"No Longer Just a Game"	April 12, 2001	Colby	Colby	Barramundi	Amber
13	"Enough Is Enough"	April 19, 2001	Tina	Colby	Barramundi	Rodger
14	"The Final Four"	April 26, 2001	Colby	Colby	Barramundi	Elisabeth
15	"The Most Deserving"	May 3, 2001	None	Colby	Barramundi	Keith
16	"The Reunion"	May 3, 2001				

In the case of multiple tribes or castaways who win reward or immunity, they are listed in order of finish, or alphabetically where it was a team effort; where one castaway won and invited others, the invitees are in brackets.

== Episodes ==
No. overall	No. in season	Title	CBS recap	Original release date	U.S. viewers (millions)	Rating/share (18–49)
15	1	"Stranded"	Recap	January 28, 2001	45.37	21.8/48
The castaways were transported to their destination on a DHC-4 Caribou loaned from the Royal Australian Air Force. Upon arrival, each tribe had 5 minutes to collect everything they needed from a box waiting for them and then faced a five-mile hike to their respective camps. The Kucha tribe got lost, and the Ogakor tribe arrived at their camp first. After arrival the Ogakor tribe argued about starting a fire and where to build their shelter.: Immunity Challenge: The two tribes faced the first immunity challenge. First, they had to cross a broken bridge using two planks. They then had to carry a torch on a raft to an island and locate two sets of ladder rungs. Finally, they had to take a second raft to a second island, use the ladder rungs to climb to a fire pit, and light it with the torch. Once Kucha got to the third section, their raft overturned and their torch went out, disqualifying them. Mitchell lit the fire for Ogakor, winning them the prize of waterproof matches and immunity.; At Tribal Council, Michael was regarded as the leader. While Jeff, who had become physically sick, got a vote for his illness, Debb was voted out unanimously for being considered the weakest link.
16	2	"Suspicion"	Recap	February 1, 2001	29.04	11.9/28
Reward Challenge: The reward challenge required the tribe members to jump off a cliff, swim out to a floating crate, and bring it back to shore through a set of rapids. Ogakor took the lead and won their second challenge in a row.; Jerri thought she saw Kel eating beef jerky, but on searching his bag they found nothing; Kel claimed it was a blade of grass.: Immunity Challenge: The immunity challenge featured tribe members eating things based on the spin of a wheel. Kimmi from Kucha faced Tina from Ogakor, and Kimmi won the challenge by eating her mangrove worm faster.; At Tribal Council, Kel was voted out.
17	3	"Trust No One"	Recap	February 8, 2001	29.04	12.2/28
Michael became fixated on providing for his tribe and was determined to ambush and catch a pig.: Reward Challenge: In the reward challenge, one member had to hold a shoulder pole while a "loader" placed buckets on the pole. The remaining tribe members would then traverse a long balance beam with a pole on their shoulder and one bucket on either side and hang it on the opposing tribe's pole. Ogakor's Colby faced off against Kucha's Michael, but before either was able to outlast the other, Michael's pole cracked in half, so a run-off race was arranged to break the tie. Ogakor won and received some fishing gear.; Immunity Challenge: At the immunity challenge, each tribe, tethered together, raced through a log chute, down a sand slide, and across the river, climbed over obstacles, and sprinted across the sand to the finish line. Kucha took a lead on the third leg, and although Rodger fell twice during the sprint, Maralyn proved too costly for Ogakor as they dropped their second straight immunity challenge.; Jerri and Mitchell each received a vote at Tribal Council, but Maralyn's weakness in challenges caused her to be voted out.
18	4	"The Killing Fields"	Recap	February 15, 2001	28.23	11.7/29
Tina and Keith were concerned about their position in the tribe following the previous night's Tribal Council, where Jerri said she was friends with everyone except them.: Reward Challenge: A caller for each tribe guide their tribe to unscramble a large nine piece slide puzzle. The map was a map to the reward for the winners. The first tribe to unscramble their puzzle got three egg laying chickens and a rooster.; Kimmi led Kucha to win the reward challenge and receive three chickens and a rooster. Michael wanted to eat the chickens as soon as possible, but Nick told him that they needed to make decisions as a group. With Nick's help, Michael caught and killed a pig.: Immunity Challenge: The challenge was a trivia challenge. Each member of each tribe would answer a question provided by Jeff. The first tribe to answer six questions correctly, won.; Ogakor took a 3–2 lead in a trivia immunity challenge, but Kucha pulled even and then won thanks to Alicia answering the final question correctly. At Tribal Council, Mitchell wanted to vote for Keith, but Colby felt he was an asset at camp. In the end, Colby sided with Keith and Tina to vote for Mitchell while Amber, Jerri, and Mitchell voted for Keith, resulting in a 3–3 tie. Although Mitchell said he could not compete with Keith and that he was physically drained, the second vote was still 2–2. Probst announced that in the event of a second tie, the person with the highest number of previous votes would leave; with the one vote cast against Mitchell at the last Tribal Council (by Keith), he was the one sent home.
19	5	"The Gloves Come Off"	Recap	February 22, 2001	28.78	11.9/28
The Ogakor beach was overcome with smoke and haze from a nearby forest fire. Kucha moved their campfire after ash jumped from the fire into their sleeping area, burning through one of Jeff's shirts.: Reward Challenge: The reward challenge was for toiletries as the tribes built stretchers and then used them to rescue their tribemates.; Ogakor took an early lead, but Kucha caught up during the second leg and pulled ahead during the final leg, winning their fourth straight challenge. Ogakor became very frustrated at losing again, especially Colby and Amber.: Immunity Challenge: Tribes had to negotiate a giant maze to collect in order five numbered medallions from five different locations within the maze. The first tribe to collect their medallions and exit the maze won Immunitiy.; Ogakor won immunity at the challenge. Alicia discussed voting off Kimmi for their personal issues, while Rodger and Elisabeth entertained the idea of voting Alicia off instead. At Tribal Council, Jeff received another vote, but it was Kimmi who was voted off.
20	6	"Trial by Fire"	Recap	March 1, 2001	31.32	13.7/34
The merge was on Kucha's mind; they wanted to go in 6–4 and knew the next immunity challenge would be key.: Reward Challenge: In the reward challenge, the tribes were blindfolded except for one member each, who had to navigate the tribe through a series of tasks. The winning tribe would receive a picnic basket of chips and soda.; Ogakor became excited at the thought of a picnic and did yoga to prepare themselves; Kucha was more focused on not having Ogakor win. Ogakor led at the beginning, but Amber veered off track and Alicia and Jeff from Kucha narrowly beat her to the end. Frustrated, Colby filled up a bucket of water and threw it at Jerri. Everyone at Kucha was relaxing around camp when Michael yelled out in pain and dove into the water. When his tribe asked what happened, he said he took a breath full of smoke and passed out, falling face first into the fire; his hands were burnt with skin hanging off. While his pain intensifying, his tribe watched helplessly from shore and tried to calm him until the medical team could aid him. The medical team arrived in the helicopter, and Michael said his goodbyes to his tribe, all of whom were visibly shaken. Ogakor received a note in tree mail saying that there had been an accident at the Kucha tribe and that no immunity challenge would take place; as a result all five of them would continue to the merge.
21	7	"The Merge"	Recap	March 8, 2001	28.72	12.1/31
Since Kimmi told Ogakor that Debb voted against Jeff at the first Tribal Council, Jeff was worried that his previous number of votes would cause him to lose after a 5–5 tie. At Ogakor, they waited for information regarding the accident. Ogakor's tree mail told the men to go to the other tribe to scout the other tribe's camp; Kucha's tree mail told the women to go. When Elisabeth and Alicia showed up at Ogakor, they filled the women in on Michael's accident. The women were shocked, but relieved to hear that it was not life-threatening. The Kucha men were surprised to see Keith and Colby and sensed that Keith was the outsider of the tribe. On day 20, the tribes merged. They were given 15 minutes to take as much as they could from their old camps. The men were frustrated that they had to move but gathered as much as they could for the hike. They named the tribe Barramundi, after the river fish.: Immunity Challenge: At the first individual immunity challenge, each tribe member stood on top of a wooden pillar in the water, with the last castaway remaining winning immunity.; When just Tina and Keith remained, Keith told Tina that he needed the immunity, and Tina stepped down. The five from Ogakor voted for Jeff, while the five from Kucha voted for Colby. In his vote, Colby said that it was a strategic move that was decided the first week they were there. At the second vote, they were still deadlocked 4–4, and Jeff was eliminated due to his prior vote.
22	8	"Friends?"	Recap	March 15, 2001	28.46	12.0/33
Immunity Challenge: The immunity challenge was a large game of dots and boxes. Despite being behind, Keith scored 17 in a row to win the challenge.; While Elisabeth thought that Jerri would be voted off, Alicia thought she was being naive and believed that it would not be in the best interest of the Ogakor tribe to eliminate Jerri. In the end, the Ogakor tribe stayed together, and Alicia was voted out. Alicia became the first member of the jury.
23	9	"The First 24 Days"	N/A	March 22, 2001	22.93	9.7/26
A recap episode of the first 24 days, including unseen footage.
24	10	"Honeymoon or Not?"	Recap	March 29, 2001	28.12	11.8/29
Heavy rains caused the river to become muddy, and most of the fishing hooks were lost. The lack of fish forced the tribe to eat more rice, diminishing their supply. In the reward challenge, the castaways competed in pairs in an obstacle course. Jerri was paired with Colby, and the two won the challenge. Their prize was a helicopter ride to the Great Barrier Reef, where they had lunch and snorkel. When they got back to Barramundi, Colby gave everyone their own piece of coral from the reef.: Immunity Challenge: The immunity challenge involved balance over strength. There were three single elimination rounds with each being a different challenge. The first round survivors randomly drew pairings and participated in a one on one tug of war while standing on a small elevated platform in the river. The winner of each pair advanced to round two. Round two paired up the winners of the previous round who stood on a shaky beam suspended over the river where they would try to make their opponent fall off the beam. The two finalists advanced to the final round where they squared off on a pair of unsteady floating platforms for another tug of war. The winner gained immunity.; Keith, Colby, and Tina voted with the Kucha three to kick Jerri out.
25	11	"Let's Make a Deal"	Recap	April 5, 2001	27.71	11.7/32
Amber felt isolated after not being told of the vote for Jerri. The contestants were down to their final serving of rice and were quickly losing energy. Keith went on a run to catch grasshoppers for bait.: Immunity Challenge: Each survivor had a large scale with a fire bucket on one end and a water bucket on the other. They had to start a fire in the fire bucket and then run to the river to fill a pail they used to fill the water bucket. The goal was to put enough water in the water bucket to tilt the scale and raise the fire bucket high enough before the fire went out to light a fuse at the top.; In the immunity challenge, Colby won by creating enough fire to raise his fire bucket to the fuse first. Colby contemplated voting Amber off, since she was bonding with Elisabeth, and he worried that she could flip to the remaining Kucha members. At Tribal Council, Nick voted for Keith because he did not bring his backpack, which Nick took as a sign of arrogance. The remaining Ogakor four voted out Nick for his comments about being ready to leave, and he became the third jury member.
26	12	"No Longer Just a Game"	Recap	April 12, 2001	27.55	11.7/34
Reward Challenge: Survivors had to negotiate a ropes course designed to confuse. They were connected to the ropes via two carabiners. At least one carabiner had to be attached to a rope at all times. There were several ropes leading to four checkpoints that had to be found in order. At each checkpoint there were more ropes leading either directly or indirectly to the next checkpoint. The first person to get to all four checkpoints and then the finish won reward. The reward was a trek through the outback on horseback with some local Stockmen, spend the night at their camp while enjoying some authentic Stockman grub.; Colby won the challenge. As the castaways were walking back from the challenge, a huge storm hit the camp. Their camp, which was located in a creek bed, flooded completely, and their rice, knives, and fishing gear were washed away. Tina and Keith went downriver to see if any of their things had washed up offshore; Keith saw the can of rice, still sealed, and went across a heavy current to get it. However, they had no way of starting a fire as the matches that were in Keith's jacket got wet.: Immunity Challenge: The challenge consisted of three ceramic plates for each contestant, with the contestant's names on them, hung from supports. Each survivor took a slingshot and tried to break the plates of the other survivors. The last survivor with an intact plate won.; At Tribal Council, Tina and Keith joined Elisabeth and Rodger to vote out Amber.
27	13	"Enough Is Enough"	Recap	April 19, 2001	28.41	11.7/32
The remaining five were excited to receive tree mail that said their loved ones would be involved in the upcoming reward challenge.: Reward Challenge: The contestants' loved ones – Tina's husband and children, Elisabeth's family, Rodger's wife, daughter, and son-in-law, Keith's girlfriend, and Colby's mother – remotely participated in a trivia reward challenge, answering questions via instant messaging.; Tina's family correctly answered 4 questions and won a 30-minute Internet chat with her and a $500 shopping spree. Each person got one final goodbye, and Keith took the opportunity to propose to his girlfriend, who said yes. The challenge boosted everyone's spirits; Colby said that for that one day, no one cared about winning a million dollars. The next morning, after a long night of rain, Keith and Rodger found a smoldering log from a forest fire, which helped them rekindle their fire. After rationing the rice for the number of days they had left, Keith continued to make more rice. Boredom began to set in, as there was nothing to do around camp.: Immunity Challenge: At the challenge, Jeff Probst told them a story about Indigenous Australians, and they had to run to eight stations and answer questions about the story. The first to get all the answers correct won immunity.; Colby won his third straight immunity challenge. Rodger told Tina that he wanted to go before Elisabeth as she needed the money a lot more than he did. Colby contemplated voting for Keith instead of Rodger, thus allowing the most deserving to make it to the end. At Tribal Council, the remaining Ogakor members honored his wishes, and Rodger was voted out.
28	14	"The Final Four"	Recap	April 26, 2001	26.89	11.2/31
With the end near, the contestants talked about how much they missed their families.: Reward Challenge: At the last reward challenge which was of an obstacle course composed of stages from previous challenges (the rope course, puzzle, and scale fire challenge), the final four had a chance to redeem themselves from past challenges.; Colby was the first through the rope course and the puzzle, followed by Elisabeth, Keith, and Tina. Colby and Elisabeth were dead even at the fire station, but Colby's bucket rose first, continuing his winning streak. The prize was a Pontiac Aztek, a good night's sleep, a hot shower and a meal. Back at camp, they received a mirror and a scale in tree mail to see how much weight they had lost and how they looked. Tina had lost 16 pounds, Elisabeth 12, Keith 27, and Colby 25. The women gave a "car-warming" gift of wildflowers to Colby. Jeff Probst took Colby to his new car and joined him at dinner. They feasted on appetizers for a few minutes, until Probst had the food brought out – by Colby's mother. He was in disbelief and excited to see her and gave her a long hug. His mom said she was not prepared to see how much weight he had lost. Colby brought his mom back to camp, and she brought care packages and news from everyone's families. Eventually, the helicopter came to take Colby's mom away.: Immunity Challenge: The immunity challenge was designed to test one thing. Memory. There were thirty-six covers with eighteen paired items under them. The survivor who uncovered the most pairs of items won immunity.; Colby led the entire time and won his fourth consecutive immunity. Colby was torn between keeping Keith, whom he believed he would win against, or Elisabeth, as she deserved to go further. At Tribal Council, Elisabeth became the sixth member of the jury.
29	15	"The Most Deserving"	Recap	May 3, 2001	36.35	15.9/39
At tree mail on day 40, the final three were given wood, paint, and feathers to create idols, which would be given back to the land. On the way to their immunity challenge, they walked past the torches of those who left before them. At the end of the walk, they found a quiet spot to reflect on their time in the Outback, then threw their idols into the river. Keith said he realized that it was not about the money and that you should walk away with something much more valuable; Tina said she had learned how much her family means to her; Colby said making the idol made him appreciate and remember why he was there.: Immunity Challenge: The final immunity challenge took place at Tribal Council. The contestants had to answer questions about the players who made up the Barramundi tribe. The one with the most correct answers won immunity.; Colby took the lead after 7 questions, but Tina pulled even. After 11 questions, they were tied, but Colby answered the final question correctly, continuing his dominance and allowing him to choose whom to take with him to the final two. Colby chose philanthropy over strategy and picked Tina, making Keith the final member of the jury. Colby and Tina each pleaded their case for a million dollars. Tina asked the jury not to vote for someone because they got their feelings hurt and that what she was going home to was worth more than a million dollars. Colby said that while he did not beat Tina in strategy, he did everything pretty well. Each member of the jury asked the two contestants a question. For their closing arguments, Colby had no comments. Tina talked about backgammon and how it related to her personal strategy, and that no one's vote off was personal. Rodger voted for Colby because he thought he played the game harder. Alicia voted for Tina, saying she really played the game by using her head. Amber voted for Colby, saying he was more straightforward and played the game better. Jerri voted for Tina, saying Tina was the mastermind behind all of the strategy that took place, including getting Colby to take her to the final two, which she deeply respected.
30	16	"The Reunion"	N/A	May 3, 2001	28.01	13.2/31
Months later, the remaining votes were read live at CBS Television City in Los Angeles for the first time ever. In addition to the four votes that were shown during the broadcast, there was one more for Colby (from Nick) and two more for Tina (from Keith and Elisabeth), giving Tina the title of "Sole Survivor". The castaways returned to discuss the season with Bryant Gumbel.
Special	Special	"Back from the Outback"	N/A	May 10, 2001	16.26	6.1/18
Follow-up interviews with the 16 contestants months after the end of the game.

== Voting history ==
	Original tribes								Merged tribe									
Episode	1	2	3	4			5	6	7			8	10	11	12	13	14	15
Day	3	6	9	12			15	17	21			24	27	30	33	36	39	41
Tribe	Kucha	Ogakor	Ogakor	Ogakor			Kucha	Kucha	Barramundi			Barramundi	Barramundi	Barramundi	Barramundi	Barramundi	Barramundi	Barramundi
Eliminated	Debb	Kel	Maralyn	Tie (Note: The first Tribal Council vote resulted in a tie. Per the rules, a second vote was held where the castaways involved in the tie would not vote and the remaining castaways could only vote for those who tied.)	Tie (Note: After two tied votes between Keith and Mitchell, a Tribal Council countback was called as a tiebreaker. Keith had no previous votes but Mitchell had one, therefore Mitchell was eliminated.)	Mitchell	Kimmi	Michael	Tie	Tie (Note: After two tied votes between Colby and Jeff, a Tribal Council countback was called as a tiebreaker. Colby had no previous votes but Jeff had two, therefore Jeff was eliminated.)	Jeff	Alicia	Jerri	Nick	Amber	Rodger	Elisabeth	Keith
Votes	7–1	7–1	5–1–1	3–3	2–2	Countback	6–1	Evacuated (Note: No vote; Michael was medically evacuated from the game.)	5–5	4–4	Countback	5–4	6–2	4–2–1	4–2	3–2	3–1	1–0
Voter	Votes																	
Tina		Kel	Maralyn	Mitchell	Mitchell				Jeff	Jeff		Alicia	Jerri	Nick	Amber	Rodger	Elisabeth	None (Note: Keith and Tina were not eligible to vote as the only eligible players they could vote for were each other.)
Colby		Kel	Maralyn	Mitchell	Mitchell				Jeff	None (Note: This player was not eligible to vote in the second round of voting.)	0 Votes	Alicia	Jerri	Nick	Rodger	Rodger	Elisabeth	Keith
Keith		Kel	Mitchell	Mitchell	None	0 Votes			Jeff	Jeff		Alicia	Jerri	Nick	Amber	Rodger	Elisabeth	None
Elisabeth	Debb						Kimmi		Colby	Colby		Jerri	Jerri	Amber	Amber	Keith	Keith	
Rodger	Debb						Kimmi		Colby	Colby		Jerri	Jerri	Amber	Amber	Keith		
Amber		Kel	Maralyn	Keith	Keith				Jeff	Jeff		Alicia	Elisabeth	Nick	Rodger			
Nick	Debb						Kimmi		Colby	Colby		Jerri	Jerri	Keith				
Jerri		Kel	Maralyn	Keith	Keith				Jeff	Jeff		Alicia	Elisabeth					
Alicia	Debb						Kimmi		Colby	Colby		Jerri						
Jeff	Debb						Kimmi		Colby	None	2 Votes							
Michael	Debb						Kimmi	Evacuated										
Kimmi	Debb						Jeff											
Mitchell		Kel	Maralyn	Keith	None	1 Vote												
Maralyn		Kel	Jerri															
Kel		Jerri																
Debb	Jeff																	

Jury vote
Episode	16	
Day	42	
Finalist	Tina	Colby
Votes	4–3	
Juror	Votes	
Keith	Yes	
Elisabeth	Yes	
Rodger		Yes
Amber		Yes
Nick		Yes
Jerri	Yes	
Alicia	Yes	

== Production ==
Filming of Survivor: The Australian Outback took place from October 23 through December 3, 2000, at Goshen Station, a cattle station on the bank of the Herbert River (approximately 3 hours southwest of Cairns) in northern Queensland. The season premiered after Super Bowl XXXV on January 28, 2001, to 43.5 million viewers.

== Reception ==
The series was well received by critics. In 2013, both Andrea Reiher of Zap2it and Joe Reid of The Wire ranked The Australian Outback as the third greatest season of the series. Ken Tucker, writing for Entertainment Weekly, gave the series a B+ grade, praising the evolution of the strategy used, but was less receptive to the editing used on the series. Since 2012, the Survivor site "Survivor Oz" has consistently ranked The Australian Outback highly in its annual polls ranking every season of the series; it was third in 2012, fourth in 2013 and 2015, and sixth in 2014. In the official issue of CBS Watch commemorating the 15th anniversary of Survivor in 2015, The Australian Outback was voted by viewers as the fourth greatest season in the series. In another poll for the same magazine, Michael Skupin's injury in the fire was voted as the ninth most memorable moment in the series. In 2015, a poll by Rob Has a Podcast ranked Australia 10th out of 30, although host Rob Cesternino ranked the season 22nd. This was updated in 2021 during Cesternino's podcast, Survivor All-Time Top 40 Rankings, ranking 20th out of 40. In 2020, this season was also ranked 17th out of 40 by "The Purple Rock Podcast", citing the good cast. Later in the year, Inside Survivor ranked this season 15th out of 40, praising the cast and iconic moments but acknowledging that the season declined after the merge of the two teams. Conversely, Dalton Ross of Entertainment Weekly called this season overrated, ranking it 24th out of 40. Host Jeff Probst ranked it as the 8th-best season, citing such memorable contestants as "Colby, the prototype for a Survivor 'hero'; Jerri, the original 'black widow'; and Elisabeth 'The View' Filarski," as well as Michael Skupin's injury. In 2021, Kristen Kranz of Collider also ranked The Australian Outback as the 8th best season of the series and praised it for having "no shortage of great players" as well as its introduction to, "some truly interesting characters to the Survivor world." In 2024, Nick Caruso of TVLine ranked this season 18th out of 47.

== Games ==
Vir2L Studios and its sister division, ZeniMax Productions (headed by former The Simpsons co-creator Sam Simon) jointly created four online games featured on the website for the series.

== Controversy ==
During a reward trip, contestant Colby Donaldson broke an Australian law by breaking off coral from the Great Barrier Reef which could have resulted in a fine of A$110,000. The helicopter pilot involved in the reward trip also broke an Australian law as he flew over sea bird rookeries. Producer Mark Burnett apologized on behalf of Donaldson and the production team after the season had aired.
