= Lisa Whelchel =

American actress, author, speaker and singer

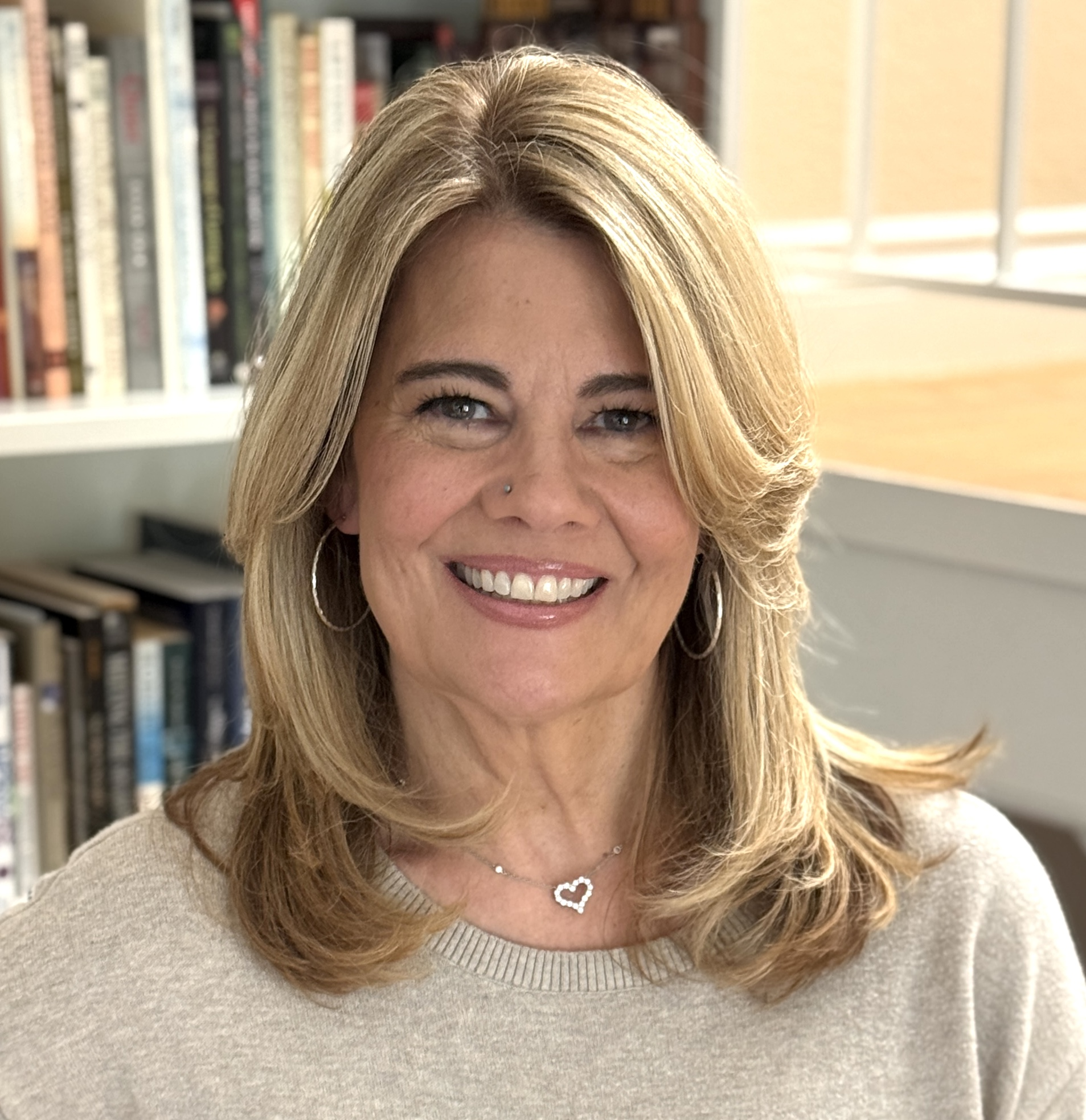
- Whelchel in 2026
- Other name: Lisa Cauble
- Occupations: Actress, author and public speaker
- Years active: 1977–present
- Organization: Women of Faith
- Notable work: The Facts of Life; The New Mickey Mouse Club; All Because of You; Survivor: Philippines
- Style: Contemporary Christian
- Spouse(s): Steven Cauble (m. 1988; div. 2012) Pete Harris (m. 2019)
- Children: 3
- Website: lisawhelchel.com

Lisa Whelchel is an American actress, singer, songwriter, author, and life coach. She appeared as a Mouseketeer on The New Mickey Mouse Club and had a role as the preppy and wealthy Blair Warner on The Facts of Life for nine years. In 1984, she was nominated for a Grammy Award for Best Inspirational Performance for her contemporary Christian album All Because of You. In 2012, Whelchel participated as a contestant on the CBS competitive reality series Survivor: Philippines and tied for second place. She was also voted fan favorite and was awarded $100,000.

== Acting career ==
=== The New Mickey Mouse Club ===
Whelchel wrote in her book, The Facts of Life: And Other Lessons My Father Taught Me, that she grew up in Texas and performed in local plays as a way of dealing with her shyness. When she was 12 years old, she learned that Disney Studios was auditioning talent for The New Mickey Mouse Club. She had acting teachers and others in her life who had ever seen her act write letters to the casting director in order to help her get an audition. She also wrote a personal letter of appeal, as she didn't recall them bringing auditions to Texas. She ultimately received a call from the casting director to audition in California. She performed a ventriloquism routine as part of her audition act. She received the role of Mouseketeer and moved to California. She appeared on the show in syndication from 1977 to 1978.

=== The Facts of Life ===
Whelchel was a main cast member on The Facts of Life, where she portrayed Blair Warner, an uptight prep student. She also played the character on Diff'rent Strokes, the show from which The Facts of Life spun off.

Whelchel once refused a storyline that would have made her character the first among the four main young women on the show to lose her virginity. The episode was originally planned for the show's second season. Having become a Christian in childhood, Whelchel declined due to her religious beliefs and the storyline was ultimately rewritten for the character of Natalie (portrayed by Mindy Cohn) in season nine. Whelchel asked to be written out of that episode entirely, later saying, “I also understood that there’s just no way to deal with that really complicated topic in a sitcom,” and that she felt “such responsibility to the girls watching the show.” In 2020, Whelchel said that if she could redo her decision, she "probably wouldn't ask to be written out of the episode. I would ask to just bring maybe some balance or some other thinking to the equation."

In 2001, Whelchel reprised her role as Blair Warner for the made-for-television movie, The Facts of Life Reunion.

On March 7, 2004, Whelchel was reunited with Charlotte Rae to perform The Facts of Life theme song at the 2nd Annual TV Land Awards at the Hollywood Palladium in Hollywood. In spring 2006, she appeared with two of her Facts of Life co-stars on The Today Show to promote the show's DVD releases of the first and second seasons, admitting to being "really bummed out" that Kim Fields was unable to attend. On February 1, 2007, Whelchel was reunited with Fields on WFAA-TV's Good Morning Texas. Fields was in Dallas to promote her appearance in the production Issues: We've All Got 'Em', when Whelchel was introduced as a surprise guest. On April 10, 2011, Whelchel and the cast of The Facts of Life, including Charlotte Rae, Nancy McKeon, Mindy Cohn, Kim Fields, Geri Jewell, and Cloris Leachman were honored with the Pop Culture Award at the 9th Annual TV Land Awards at the Javits Center in New York City.

In 2021, Whelchel, Fields, and Cohn reunited again on the set of Live in Front of a Studio Audience's reenactment of the show's third season episode "Kids Can Be Cruel." Whelchel also sang the show's theme song that evening.

== Music career ==
In 1984, Whelchel released a Christian pop album entitled All Because of You. The album reached No. 17 on the Billboard Contemporary Christian music charts. She was nominated for a Grammy Award for Best Inspirational Performance and was recognized as the writer of the title song, "All Because of You". Among the songs featured on the album were "All Because of You", "Just Obey", "Cover Me, Lord", and "Good Girl". While she was appearing on The Facts of Life, she made a cameo appearance in the music video for contemporary Christian music singer-songwriter Steve Taylor's song "Meltdown (at Madame Tussaud's)". The song was the title track from the album Meltdown.

== Speaking ==
Whelchel has been a keynote speaker at churches and conferences. In 2000, she founded Momtime Ministries, a religious network of mothers' groups who met weekly to "equip and refresh and encourage" each other.

In 2021, Whelchel appeared on the Mondays with Mindy podcast, with friend and fellow Facts of Life co-star, Mindy Cohn. Whelchel discussed her faith and how it has changed and evolved over time. She explained that her speaking commitments have shifted over the years, as she no longer operates from a "fear-based, punishment-based" mentality. She explained, "Jesus came, ultimately, to bring grace. I can speak that message in any situation, but a lot of churches — when they find out that I believe that there are many ways to experience God, not just Jesus, then the invitations kind of dry up."

== Writing ==
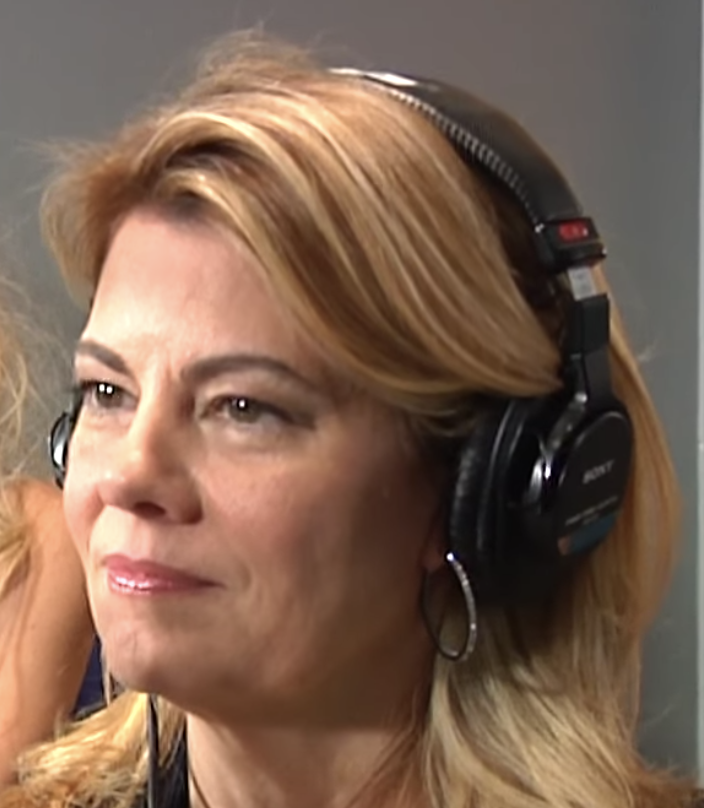
Whelchel in 2015

Whelchel has written books on motherhood, child discipline, adult friendships, homeschooling, and spirituality, including books on prayer and wisdom. She is the author of So You're Thinking About Homeschooling and The Facts of Life (and Other Lessons My Father Taught Me). In the latter book, she also discussed her career and experiences with body image.

In 2026, Whelchel began writing a Substack. On the Substack, she described plans to discuss both her career and her various spiritual experiences, including attending a 30-day silent retreat, ayahuasca ceremonies, and walking the Camino de Santiago, as well as reflections on how her religious beliefs have changed over time.

In a 2026 interview where she discussed her Substack topics, Whelchel shared that, following her divorce, she began reevaluating the fundamentalist evangelical beliefs that had shaped much of her adult life. Her views were further influenced by gay Christians close to her, whose exclusion within the church she came to see as incompatible with her understanding of faith and love. She later described the transition as a shift from externally imposed religious expectations toward a more personal, conscience-led spirituality.

== Survivor ==
On August 20, 2012, Whelchel was announced as a contestant in Survivor: Philippines as a member of the Tandang tribe. She joined retired Major League Baseball star Jeff Kent as one of the season's two "celebrity" contestants. As a former television star, Welchel elected to keep her true identity a secret from the other contestants, many of whom were too young to have watched The Facts of Life during its original run and thus would not have recognized her. Michael Skupin and Jonathan Penner, who were around Whelchel's age, as well as eventual winner Denise Stapley, were the only ones to recognize her as "Blair Warner."

On November 14, 2012, Whelchel announced that she was suffering from West Nile fever and had been advised by her doctor that recovery would take approximately one year. She did not specify whether she had contracted the arbovirus while in the Philippines shooting Survivor.

On December 16, 2012, Whelchel made it to the Final Tribal Council, where fellow contestant and jury member Jonathan Penner revealed to the rest of the jury that she was a former child star. In the end, she received one jury vote from RC Saint-Amour and tied with returning contestant Michael Skupin for runner-up, both losing to eventual winner Denise Stapley. She was also voted the Sprint Player of the Season, winning $100,000 by a margin of about .7 percent against Malcolm Freberg.

== Hosting duties ==
On January 14, 2013, Whelchel co-hosted several episodes of The Jeff Probst Show with Survivor host, Jeff Probst.

In 2019, Whelchel began hosting the MeTV series, Collector's Call. In April of that same year, Whelchel hosted a The Facts of Life marathon on the network, as a lead-in for a preview of the series. As of 2026, the show is in its seventh season.

== Personal life ==
After recording her music album, Whelchel briefly dated fellow Christian musician Steve Taylor and appeared in his music video for "Meltdown (at Madame Tussaud's)". On July 9, 1988, Whelchel married Steven Cauble, who was an associate pastor at The Church on the Way in Van Nuys, California, which Whelchel attended at the time. The couple had three children together, before divorcing in March 2012. In 2019, Whelchel married Pete Harris, a psychologist. Whelchel has one stepson from the marriage, whom she has referred to as her 'bonus son.'

In 2026, Whelchel publicly shared her experiences participating in four Ayahuasca ceremonies in Peru.

== Published works ==
- Whelchel, Lisa. Creative Correction, Tyndale House Publishers, 320 pages, 2000. ISBN 978-1561799015
- Whelchel, Lisa. The Facts of Life (and Other Lessons My Father Taught Me), Multnomah Books, 192 pages, 2001. ISBN 978-1590521489
- Whelchel, Lisa. So You're Thinking About Homeschooling: Fifteen Families Show How You Can Do It (2nd edition), Multnomah Books, 224 pages, 2005. ISBN 978-1590525111
- Whelchel, Lisa. How to Start Your Own Mom Time
- The ADVENTure of Christmas: Helping Children Find Jesus in Our Holiday Traditions
- Taking Care of the Me in Mommy
- The Busy Mom's Guide to Prayer
- The Busy Mom's Guide to Wisdom
- The Busy Grandma's Guide to Prayer
- Speaking Mom-ese: Moments of Peace & Inspiration in the Mother Tongue from One Mom's Heart to Yours

== Filmography ==
=== Film ===
Year	Title	Role	Notes
1979	The Double McGuffin	Jody	
1979	The Magician of Lublin	Halina	
1992	Where the Red Fern Grows: Part Two	Sara Coleman	Direct-to-video film
2013	A Madea Christmas	Nancy Porter	
2014	For Better or for Worse	Wendy Hampton	
2025	Roswell Delirium	Mrs. Peltzer	

=== Television ===
Year	Title	Role	Notes
1977–78	The New Mickey Mouse Club	Mouseketeer/Herself	Main cast (130 episodes)
1977	The Wonderful World of Disney	Mouseketeer/Herself	Episode: "The Mouseketeers at Walt Disney World"
1978	Family	Cathy Connelly	Episode: "All for Love"
1979	The Wonderful World of Disney	Robin Lapp	Episode: "Shadow of Fear" (Parts 1 & 2)
1979	The Mary Tyler Moore Hour	Gail Connors	Episode #1.6
1979–81	Diff'rent Strokes	Blair Warner	2 episodes
1979–88	The Facts of Life	Blair Warner	Main cast (200 episodes)
1980	Skyward	Lisa Ward	Television film
1981	Twirl	Jill Moore	Television film
1982	The Facts of Life Goes to Paris	Blair Warner	Television film
1982	The Wild Women of Chastity Gulch	Amy Cole	Television film
1983–85	The Love Boat	Caroline Shea / Kelly Barrett	4 episodes
1985	Back to Next Saturday	Blair Warner	Television film
1987	The Facts of Life Down Under	Blair Warner	Television film
2001	The Facts of Life Reunion	Blair Warner	Television film
2012	Survivor: Philippines	Herself (Contestant)	Co-runner-up
2013	The Jeff Probst Show	Herself (Co-host)	16 episodes
2014	For Better or For Worse	Wendy	Television film
2016	Hearts of Spring	Carly Ashby	Television film
2016	A Snow Capped Christmas	Dale Benson	Television film
2019–present	Collector's Call	Herself (Host)	125 episodes
2019	You Light Up My Christmas	Aurora	Television film
2021	Live in Front of a Studio Audience	Herself	Episode: "The Facts of Life and Diff'rent Strokes"
2022–23	Toon In with Me	Herself	2 episodes

=== Music videos ===
Year	Title	Artist	Role
1984	"Meltdown (at Madame Tussaud's)"	Steve Taylor	News reporter

=== Producer ===
Year	Title	Credited As	Notes
2013	Lisa Whelchel's Everyday Workout for the Everyday Woman	Executive producer	Also director and host
2016	Hearts of Spring	Co-executive producer	Also actress

== Discography ==
Year	Title	Label	Distributor
1984	All Because of You	Nissi Records	Sparrow Records

== Awards and nominations ==
Year	Association	Category	Work	Result
1982	Young Artist Awards	Best Young Comedienne - Motion Picture or Television	The Facts of Life	Nominated
1982	Young Artist Awards	Best Young Actress in a Television Special	Twirl	Nominated
1983	Young Artist Awards	Best Young Actress in a Comedy Series	The Facts of Life	Nominated
1984	Young Artist Awards	Best Young Actress in a Comedy Series	The Facts of Life	Nominated
1984	Grammy Awards	Best Inspirational Performance	All Because of You	Nominated
2011	TV Land Awards	Pop Culture Award (shared with cast)	The Facts of Life	Won

== See also ==
Preceded by Sabrina Thompson	Runner-Up of Survivor; Survivor: Philippines	Succeeded by Dawn Meehan, Sherri Biethman
