= Survivor: Philippines =

- Season 25
- Region 1 DVD cover
- Presented by: Jeff Probst
- No. of days: 39
- No. of castaways: 18
- Winner: Denise Stapley
- Runners-up: Lisa Whelchel; Michael Skupin
- Location: Caramoan, Philippines
- Sprint Player of the Season: Lisa Whelchel
- No. of episodes: 15

Release
- Original network: CBS
- Original release: September 19 – December 16, 2012

Additional information
- Filming dates: March 18 – April 25, 2012

Season chronology
- ← Previous; One World Next → Caramoan — Fans vs. Favorites

Survivor: Philippines is the twenty-fifth season of the American CBS competitive reality television series Survivor. The season was filmed March 18 – April 25, 2012, and premiered on September 19, 2012, with a special 90-minute episode. It is the first season since Survivor: All-Stars to begin with three tribes and the seventh season overall to feature returning castaways.

Denise Stapley was named the winner in the final episode on December 16, 2012, defeating Lisa Whelchel and Michael Skupin in a 6–1–1 vote, marking the second time in Survivor history (after China exactly 10 seasons earlier) where all three finalists received at least one vote. Stapley is the oldest female winner in the show's history, and the only person to have attended and survived every Tribal Council in a single season. Whelchel won $100,000 as the "Sprint Player of the Season", narrowly beating out Malcolm Freberg by 0.7% of a voting margin; the closest margin in the history of the award.

== Format ==
Survivor is a reality television show based on the Swedish show Expedition Robinson, created by Mark Burnett and Charlie Parsons. The series follows a number of participants isolated in a remote location, where they must provide food, fire, and shelter. One participant is removed from the series by majority vote every three days, with challenges held to give a reward (ranging from living- and food-related prizes to a car) and immunity from being voted out of the series. The last remaining player receives a prize of $1,000,000.

== Contestants ==
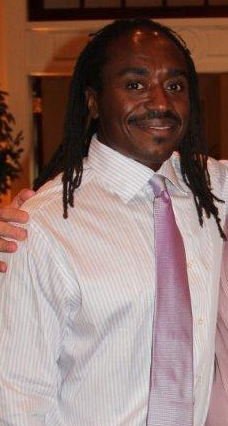
Russell Swan

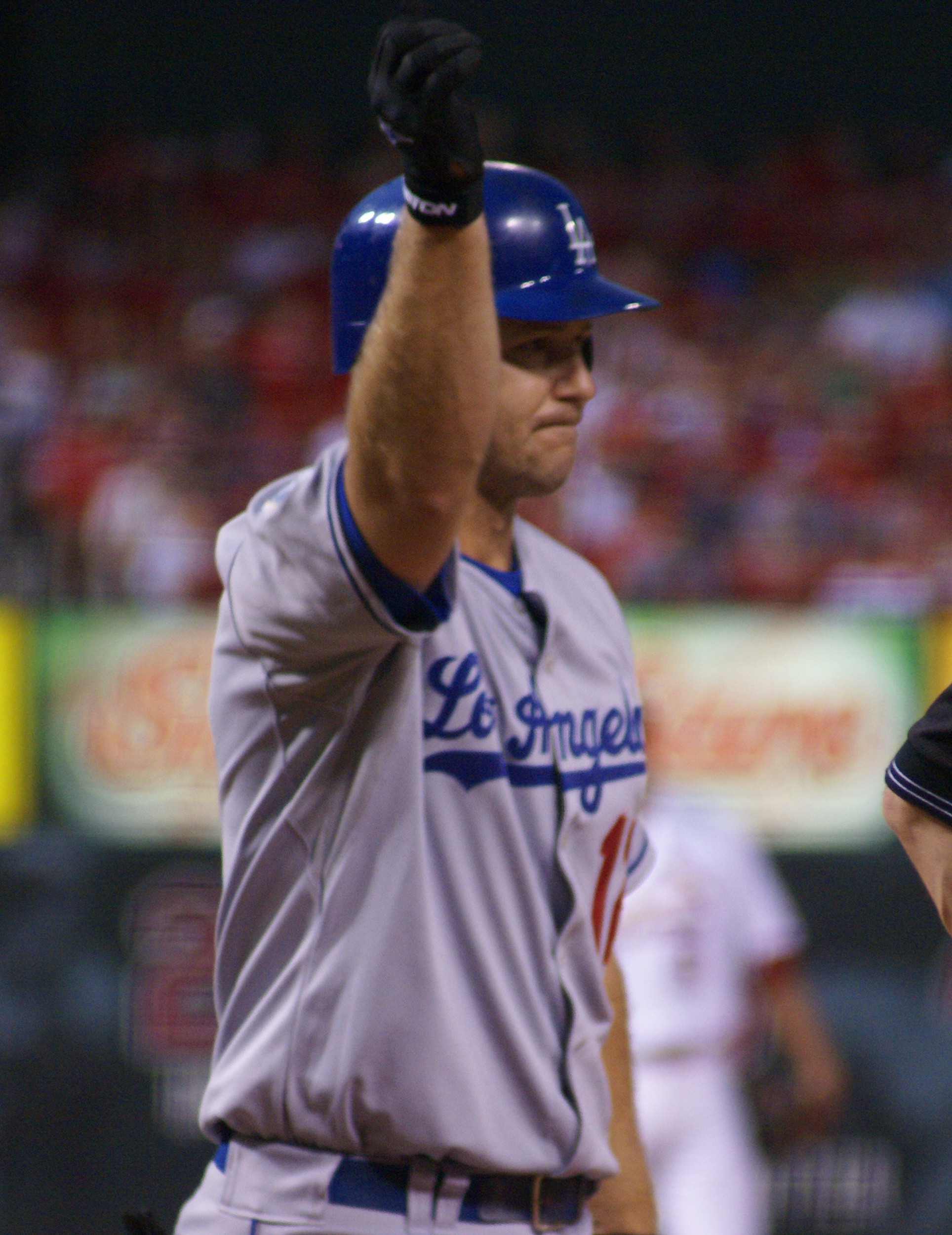
Jeff Kent

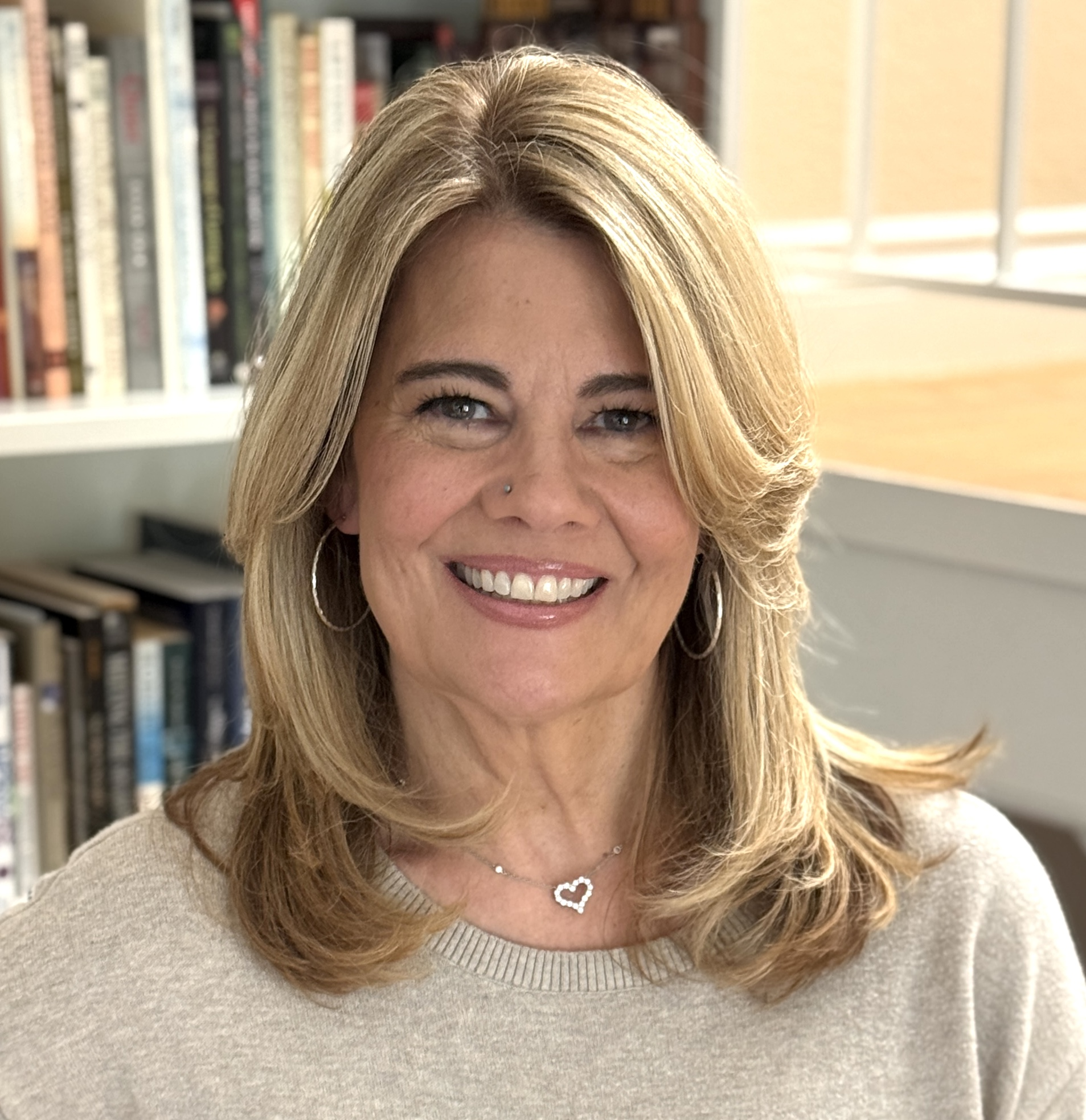
Lisa Whelchel

The contestants include 15 new players to the game and three returning players, who were previously removed from their earlier seasons due to injuries, initially split into three tribes: Tandang, Kalabaw and Matsing. The merged tribe Dangrayne is a take on "dang rain".

Notable new contestants this season include The Facts of Life star Lisa Whelchel; former Major League Baseball player Jeff Kent; Miss Delaware USA 2011 and Miss USA 2011 competitor Katie Hanson; and Miss Utah Teen USA 2010 and Miss Teen USA 2010 3rd runner-up Angelia "Angie" Layton. Abi-Maria Gomes was originally recruited for Survivor: Tocantins because of her Brazilian heritage; however, she was cut.

List of Survivor: Philippines contestants
Contestant	Age	From	Tribe			Finish	
Contestant	Age	From	Original	Absorbed	Merged	Placement	Day
Zane Knight	28	Danville, Virginia	Matsing			1st voted out	Day 3
Roxanne "Roxy" Morris	28	Brooklyn, New York	Matsing			2nd voted out	Day 6
Angie Layton	20	Provo, Utah	Matsing			3rd voted out	Day 8
Russell Swan Samoa	45	Glenside, Pennsylvania	Matsing			4th voted out	Day 10
Dana Lambert	32	Winston-Salem, North Carolina	Kalabaw	Kalabaw		Quit (Illness)	Day 12
Sarah Dawson	28	Silver Spring, Maryland	Kalabaw	Kalabaw		5th voted out	Day 13
Katie Hanson	22	Newark, Delaware	Kalabaw	Kalabaw		6th voted out	Day 16
Roberta "RC" Saint-Amour	27	New York City, New York	Tandang	Tandang	Dangrayne	7th voted out 1st jury member	Day 19
Jeff Kent	44	Austin, Texas	Kalabaw	Kalabaw	Dangrayne	8th voted out 2nd jury member	Day 22
Artis Silvester	53	Terrytown, Louisiana	Tandang	Tandang	Dangrayne	9th voted out 3rd jury member	Day 25
Pete Yurkowski	24	Holmdel, New Jersey	Tandang	Tandang	Dangrayne	10th voted out 4th jury member	Day 27
Jonathan Penner Cook Islands & Micronesia	50	Los Angeles, California	Kalabaw	Kalabaw	Dangrayne	11th voted out 5th jury member	Day 30
Carter Williams	23	Shawnee, Kansas	Kalabaw	Kalabaw	Dangrayne	12th voted out 6th jury member	Day 33
Abi-Maria Gomes	32	Los Angeles, California	Tandang	Tandang	Dangrayne	13th voted out 7th jury member	Day 36
Malcolm Freberg	25	Hermosa Beach, California	Matsing	Tandang	Dangrayne	14th voted out 8th jury member	Day 38
Michael Skupin The Australian Outback	50	White Lake, Michigan	Tandang	Tandang	Dangrayne	Co-runners-up	Day 39
Lisa Whelchel	49	Dallas, Texas	Tandang	Tandang	Dangrayne	Co-runners-up	Day 39
Denise Stapley	41	Cedar Rapids, Iowa	Matsing	Kalabaw	Dangrayne	Sole Survivor	Day 39

=== Future appearances ===
Malcolm Freberg returned to compete in the following season, Survivor: Caramoan, and later returned again for Survivor: Game Changers. Abi-Maria Gomes returned for Survivor: Cambodia. Denise Stapley returned to compete on Survivor: Winners at War.

Outside of Survivor, Gomes competed with two-time Survivor contestant Sierra Dawn Thomas on a Survivor vs Big Brother episode of Fear Factor. Freberg was a contestant on the 2022 USA Network reality competition series Snake in the Grass.

== Season summary ==
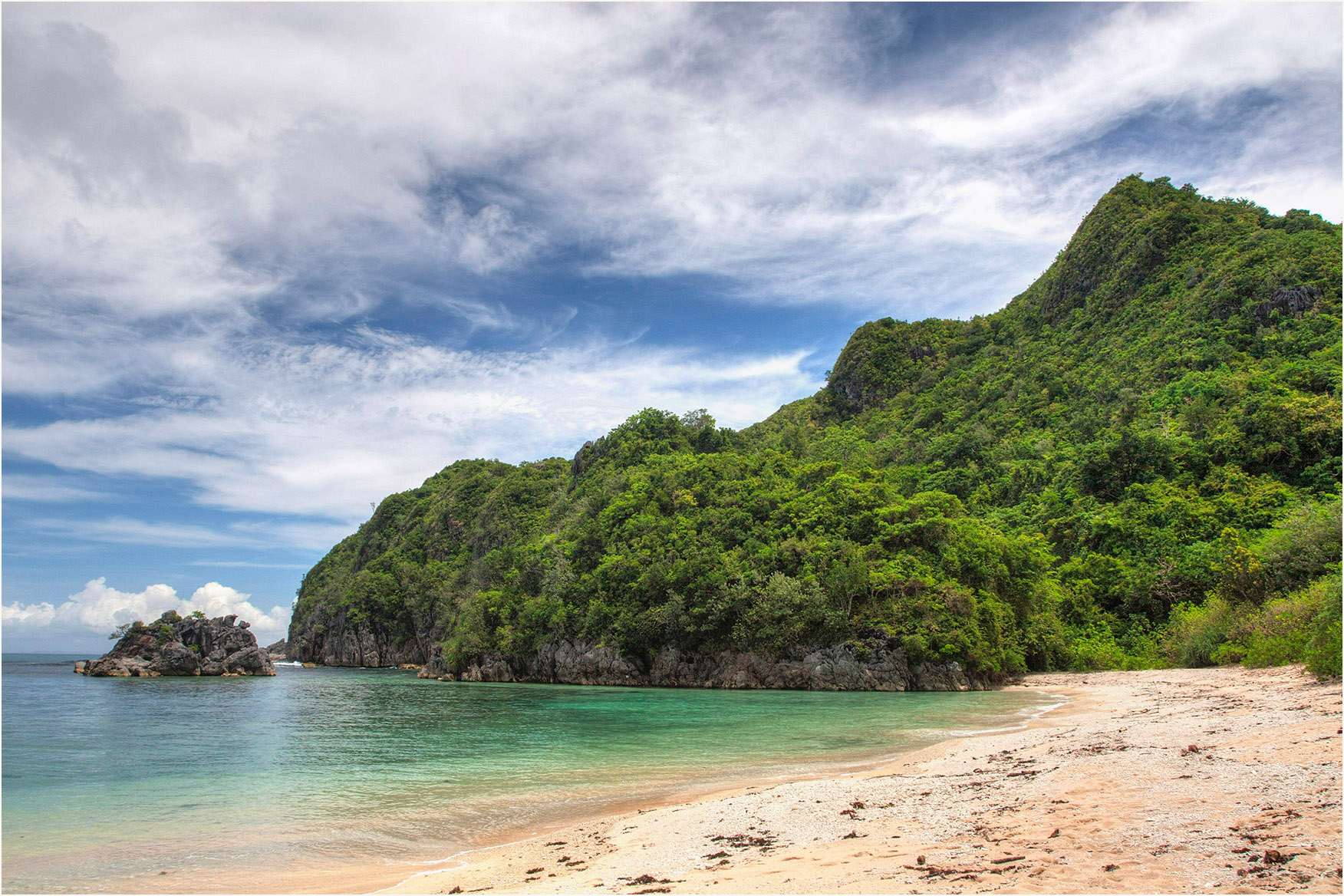
The season filmed in the Caramoan Peninsula of the Philippines.

The fifteen new castaways were split into three tribes and then introduced to their final tribe members, three returning castaways that had been medically evacuated from their previous seasons: Michael Skupin was assigned to Tandang, Jonathan Penner to Kalabaw, and Russell Swan to Matsing. Matsing lost the first four immunity challenges, leaving only Malcolm, who found the tribe's Hidden Immunity Idol on Day 11, and Denise, his closest ally since the start of the game. After Matsing's dissolution, Malcolm was sent to Tandang and Denise to Kalabaw. Malcolm quickly integrated himself with Tandang's dominant alliance, led by Pete, while Denise joined Kalabaw's majority alliance, led by Jeff Kent. Though Jeff strongly desired to eliminate the returning players, Jonathan had found Kalabaw's immunity idol, using it as leverage to align with Jeff Kent and Carter.

The tribes merged with Tandang holding the majority. Lisa accidentally discovered Malcolm's hidden immunity idol, and promised to keep it a secret if he agreed to take her and Denise to the end of the game. After Jeff Kent and Carter allied with Pete's alliance to vote out the returning players, Jonathan used his idol to save himself. Lisa revealed the existence of Malcolm's idol to the others in an attempt to blindside him. However, after Malcolm convinced the Tandang alliance that he was planning on playing his idol, they voted out Jeff Kent instead. Lisa and Michael, on the bottom of the Tandang alliance, eventually flipped sides, working with the remnants of Kalabaw and Matsing to eliminate the other former Tandang members. Soon after, a core alliance of Michael, Lisa, Malcolm, and Denise was formed, systematically eliminating the others.

Despite winning an advantage in the final Immunity Challenge, Malcolm failed to win immunity and he was subsequently voted out for being the largest threat against the jury. All three finalists were berated by the jury at the Final Tribal Council; Lisa for claiming that she could not handle the pressures of the game, Michael for being strategically and socially inept, and Denise for being condescending at times. However, Denise's argument, coupled with the fact that she was the first player in Survivor history to attend and survive every Tribal Council in the game, proved to be the most effective when she earned the title of Sole Survivor by a 6–1–1 vote.

Challenge winners and eliminations by episode
Episode			Challenge winner(s)		Eliminated	
No.	Title	Original air date	Reward	Immunity	Tribe	Player
1	"Survivor Smacked Me in the Chops"	September 19, 2012	Kalabaw		Matsing	Zane
1	"Survivor Smacked Me in the Chops"	September 19, 2012	Tandang		Matsing	Zane
2	"Don't be Blinded by the Headlights"	September 26, 2012	Tandang		Matsing	Roxy
2	"Don't be Blinded by the Headlights"	September 26, 2012	Kalabaw		Matsing	Roxy
3	"This Isn't a 'We' Game"	October 3, 2012	Kalabaw		Matsing	Angie
3	"This Isn't a 'We' Game"	October 3, 2012	Tandang		Matsing	Angie
4	"Create a Little Chaos"	October 10, 2012	Tandang		Matsing	Russell
4	"Create a Little Chaos"	October 10, 2012	Kalabaw		Matsing	Russell
5	"Got My Swag Back"	October 17, 2012	Tandang	Tandang	Kalabaw	Dana
5	"Got My Swag Back"	October 17, 2012	Tandang	Tandang	Kalabaw	Dawson
6	"Down and Dirty"	October 24, 2012	Kalabaw (Note: Tandang forfeited the challenge.)	Tandang	Kalabaw	Katie
7	"Not the Only Actor on This Island"	October 31, 2012	None (Note: There was no reward challenge due to the merge.)	Denise	Dangrayne	RC
7	"Not the Only Actor on This Island"	October 31, 2012	None	Carter	Dangrayne	RC
8	"Dead Man Walking"	November 7, 2012	Denise, Jeff, Jonathan, Lisa, Malcolm	Jonathan	Dangrayne	Jeff
9	"Little Miss Perfect"	November 14, 2012	Carter, Denise, Jonathan, Malcolm	Michael	Dangrayne	Artis
10	"Whiners are Wieners"	November 21, 2012	Abi-Maria, Carter, Malcolm, Pete	Carter	Dangrayne	Pete
11	"Hell Hath Frozen Over"	November 28, 2012	Survivor Auction	Abi-Maria	Dangrayne	Jonathan
12	"Shot Into Smithereens"	December 5, 2012	Malcolm [Lisa, Michael]	Malcolm	Dangrayne	Carter
13	"Gouge My Eyes Out"	December 12, 2012	Michael [Lisa, Malcolm]	Malcolm	Dangrayne	Abi-Maria
14	"Million Dollar Question"	December 16, 2012	Malcolm	Michael	Dangrayne	Malcolm
15	"Reunion"	December 16, 2012				

In the case of multiple tribes or castaways who win reward or immunity, they are listed in order of finish, or alphabetically where it was a team effort; where one castaway won and invited others, the invitees are in brackets.

== Episodes ==
No. overall	No. in season	Title	Rating/share (household)	Rating/share (18–49)	Original release date	U.S. viewers (millions)	Weekly rank
367	1	"Survivor Smacked Me in the Chops"	6.6/11	3.2/10	September 19, 2012	11.37	#8
The fifteen new castaways, already divided into three tribes, were brought in by boat; the three returning castaways were introduced and assigned to these tribes. The tribes were then given sixty seconds to offload as many supplies from the boat to rafts to start their camps. At Matsing, Russell, who had taken a leadership role in his previous appearance, tried to step away from that role, but still ended up making most of the tribe's decisions, irritating the others. Russell found a clue for the hidden immunity idol, and while successful in hiding it, was caught reading the clue by Zane. Russell asserted that anyone looking for the idol would be voted out. The new castaways in Kalabaw immediately targeted Jonathan as their first elimination, while Jonathan began searching for the hidden immunity idol, coming across the clue for it. Dawson recognized Jeff Kent as a baseball player, but kept this information to herself. On Tandang, Michael formed an alliance with RC, Abi-Maria, and Pete; Michael also privately told Lisa that he recognized her from her acting career.: Reward/Immunity Challenge: The tribes would be divided into pairs. The first pair from each tribe would be tethered together and have to race through the jungle and up a cargo net to retrieve two paddles. The next pair of castaways would use the paddles to paddle a boat out in the ocean to a buoy where they would dive to release a chest and swim it back to shore. All six castaways would then push the chest up the beach to a puzzle assembly mat. The final pair of castaways would use the pieces inside the chest to assemble a puzzle. The first two tribes to complete their puzzle would win immunity. The first-place tribe would win a complete fire-starting kit of wood, flint, and lighter fluid. Second-place would win flint only.; At the Reward/Immunity challenge, Kalabaw edged out Tandang to win, while Matsing ended up losing the challenge. At Matsing's camp, the tribe blamed their loss on Russell for poorly choosing roles for the challenge; Zane then asked the tribe to vote him out because he said he did not do well at the challenge. Zane claimed this was a plan to gain the tribe's sympathy and to instead vote for Russell. Zane, Malcolm, and Denise considered if Russell had the hidden immunity idol already and swapping votes to flush it out. At tribal council, the tribe focused on Russell's poor leadership, which he apologized for being the self-described dictator of the tribe. When the vote came, Zane was sent home unanimously. Before the tribe left, Jeff Probst gave them flint.
368	2	"Don't be Blinded by the Headlights"	6.3/10	3.1/9	September 26, 2012	10.31	#24
At Matsing, Angie and Malcolm's overnight cuddling made Roxy think they were becoming a dangerous pair and she wanted Angie voted out to break up the pair. At Tandang, RC found the clue to the Hidden Immunity Idol, which she shared with Abi-Maria. However, their alliance was an uneasy, suspicious one as Abi-Maria thought RC might be making side alliances with Michael. The tribe thought Lisa spent a lot of time looking for the Hidden Immunity Idol, but in reality, she was just wandering out of camp to be by herself as she felt she was an outsider in her tribe. Over at Kalabaw, Jonathan found the Hidden Immunity Idol: a token on the lid of a box at camp.: Reward/Immunity Challenge: Going on in pairs, the tribes would pull a sled to three stations to retrieve puzzle pieces. Once all the pieces are retrieved, one castaway would work as a caller to help two castaways solve three large puzzles. The first two tribes to complete their puzzle would win immunity. First place wins reward of blankets, pillows, and a tarp. Second place wins reward of a tarp only.; In the closely fought combined Reward/Immunity Challenge, Tandang beat out Kalabaw, while Matsing again came in third. Back at camp, Roxy pulled Russell aside and began to campaign against Malcolm and Angie. Russell seemed to agree with her, and he later had the same conversation with Denise. At Tribal Council, Roxy called out the pair of Angie and Malcolm as being more than just friends, which the two denied. When the vote came, the tribe voted out Roxy.
369	3	"This Isn't a 'We' Game"	6.4/10	3.0/9	October 3, 2012	10.38	#16
The uneasy alliance between Abi-Maria and RC continued at Tandang. Abi-Maria told Pete about the clue to the Hidden Immunity Idol. They found the idol while the rest of the tribe was hunting for clams. Pete talked to Lisa about joining with Abi-Maria to blindside Michael and neutralize RC. Over at Kalabaw, the tribe discovered the missing emblem on the rice container, correctly guessing it had been the Hidden Immunity Idol and that Jonathan had found it. Jonathan later told Jeff Kent that he had the Hidden Immunity Idol in order to try to gain Jeff Kent's trust, but Kent was still leery of Jonathan.: Reward/Immunity Challenge: One castaway at a time, the tribes would dive in the ocean to a puzzle wheel attached to a rope. Once eight puzzle wheels were retrieved, the tribe would use the wheels to solve a puzzle. The first two tribes to complete their puzzle would win immunity. First place wins reward of a fishing kit and a canoe. Second place wins reward of a smaller fishing kit.; At the combined Reward/Immunity Challenge, Kalabaw and Tandang continued their dominance in the challenges over Matsing, whose failure was attributed to both Angie and Russell physically giving up at the challenge. At Tribal Council, the vote came down to a decision for Denise and Malcolm to send Angie or Russell home. They chose Angie and she was sent home.
370	4	"Create a Little Chaos"	6.4/10	2.8/8	October 10, 2012	9.82	#22
At Tandang, Pete stirred up trouble in the tribe by planting the clue to the Hidden Immunity Idol in RC's bag where it fell out in front of everybody. Abi-Maria immediately thought that RC had betrayed her. A bewildered RC tried to talk to Abi-Maria about it, but Abi-Maria refused to talk to RC. Over at Kalabaw, the new castaways' plan to vote out Jonathan fell apart when Jeff Kent changed his mind about aligning with Jonathan now that Jonathan had the Hidden Immunity Idol. The two along with Carter formed an alliance while they were out fishing. Back at camp, the women of Kalabaw were suspicious of the men going out on their own and formed their own alliance. Russell continued to look for the Hidden Immunity Idol at Matsing's camp, causing Denise and Malcolm to become suspicious that he might already have it and considered voting him out at the next Tribal Council to blindside him.: Reward/Immunity Challenge: One at a time, the castaways would carry two large pots of rice on a bamboo pole across an obstacle course. At the end of the course, the castaway would place the two pots on a stand and return to the starting mat. The castaways would take turns until six pots were placed on their stands. The entire tribe would then cross the obstacle course. One tribe member would then swing a ball attached to a rope to smash all six pots. The first two tribes to smash their six pots would win immunity. First place wins reward of steaks, vegetables, spices, a pot, and utensils. Second place wins reward of vegetables, salt, pepper, and a pot. The tribes could optionally trade the rewards in for a tarp.; At the Immunity Challenge, Matsing had the lead for much of the obstacle course stage, but lost to Kalabaw at the final stage, and went to their fourth Tribal Council in a row. After the challenge, Kalabaw decided to trade out their reward. Back at the Matsing camp, Denise and Malcolm agreed to vote for Russell, but would try to make Russell feel comfortable heading into Tribal Council just in case he had the Hidden Immunity Idol. At Tribal Council, all were concerned that they were going home, but in the end, Russell was sent home.
371	5	"Got My Swag Back"	6.3/10	2.8/8	October 17, 2012	10.43	#17
Anticipating a possible tribal absorption, Denise and Malcolm looked for and found the Hidden Immunity Idol before heading to the Reward Challenge; Malcolm took possession of the idol. Prior to the Reward Challenge, Matsing was declared defeated by the other two tribes. Malcolm was transferred to Tandang, and Denise to Kalabaw.: Reward Challenge: Facing off one against one in a fenced off circle, a castaway from each tribe would hold a wooden idol on top of a platform that they would hold in one hand. They would use the other free hand to attempt to knock their opponent's idol off the platform. The castaway whose idol hit the ground last would score one point for their tribe. The first tribe to score five points would win muffins, cookies, coffee, biscuits and tea.; Malcolm scored the final point of the match for the Tandang win, earning respect from his new tribe and leading Pete to tell Malcolm about the idol. At Kalabaw, Dana started suffering from stomach pains. Jeff Probst and the Survivor medical team were brought in, and though the team had cleared Dana to continue playing, she opted to leave the game to prevent her illness from worsening.: Immunity Challenge: The tribes would race through an obstacle course down a ramp to a pit filled with water, up a hill, and then a rope net climb. The tribes would then untie knots to release a draw bridge. One person from each tribe would then chop through a block of wood to release a rope which would release a large pile of bamboo puzzle pieces. The tribes would search through the pieces to find ones with letters printed on them. Two castaways from each tribe would then use the lettered pieces to solve a puzzle. The first tribe to solve the puzzle would win.; At the Immunity Challenge, Tandang narrowly beat out Kalabaw, who lost time due to Katie's weak performance on the first obstacle; she would apologize for this later at camp. Denise told Jeff Kent that she would join the men's alliance; the four discussed voting out Katie or Dawson. At Tribal Council, the tribe discussed performance at challenges. When the vote came, Dawson was voted out.
372	6	"Down and Dirty"	6.3/10	2.8/8	October 24, 2012	10.23	#22
On day 15, the Tandang tribe was upset at Michael for him being partially responsible for the tribe's food being quickly depleted.: Reward Challenge: Facing off three on three, the tribes would try to push a large wood ball across a mud field to their goal. The tribe would score a point for pushing the ball to the goal. The first tribe to score three points would win a trip to a picnic with sandwiches, soup, potato chips, and brownies.; During the first round of the Reward Challenge, Michael, Pete, and Lisa faced off against Jonathan, Carter, and Denise. The six fought to a standstill for over an hour when Jonathan proposed a deal: Kalabaw would give up all of their remaining rice in exchange winning the reward. Jonathan told his tribe that the deal was okay because he promised that he could catch fish. Michael persuaded his tribe to hear out Jonathan's proposal and after some discussion, Tandang agreed to the deal. At the reward, Kalabaw was surprised by an undeclared extra reward of letters from home. Back at the Tandang tribe, Artis, Abi-Maria, and Pete were livid at the deal struck at the challenge and blamed Michael for speaking for the tribe even though they felt he brought nothing to the tribe. The next day, Jonathan only caught a couple small fish, which caused a lot of grumbling among the tribe.: Immunity Challenge: Two tribemates from each tribe would alternate launching balls from a slingshot while the remaining four tribemates have to catch the balls with handheld nets. Catching a ball would score one point for their tribe. The first tribe to reach five points would win.; At the Immunity Challenge, Tandang came back from a 4–2 deficit to defeat Kalabaw, again largely due to Malcolm's contributions. When Kalabaw returned to camp, Jeff Kent and Carter discussed if now was the time to make the big move against Jonathan or to vote out Katie for being the weakest in the tribe. At Tribal Council, Jeff Kent and Carter voted against Katie, and she was sent home.
373	7	"Not the Only Actor on This Island"	6.1/10	2.5/8	October 31, 2012	9.83	#24
On day 17, two boats arrived at Tandang and Kalabaw's beaches to take them to a new beach, and the tribes merge. Jeff Kent's past was kept a secret, while Lisa was recognized by Jonathan, who assured her he would keep it a secret. While airing out the tribe's clothes, Lisa accidentally discovered Malcolm's Hidden Immunity Idol. Malcolm then took Lisa aside to do damage control, and she told him she would keep her knowledge of the idol a secret after he promised to take her to the Final Three along with Denise. Still wanting to vote out the returning players first, particularly Jonathan, Jeff Kent sided with the Tandang tribe and followed Malcolm's plan to split the next Tribal Council vote between Jonathan and RC – to either vote out Jonathan or force him to use the Hidden Immunity Idol. Meanwhile, Jonathan tried to get Michael to flip to the Kalabaw side. Michael and RC discussed flipping, telling Jonathan they could not work with Pete and that they wanted him gone. Michael then talked to Jeff Kent about the possibility of joining Kalabaw to vote out one of the former Tandang tribe members, but Jeff Kent told Michael that he really wanted to vote out Jonathan. Michael agreed to follow Jeff Kent's lead.: Immunity Challenge: The castaways would hold on to a metal rod to which one end of a rope is spooled around. The other end of the rope is attached to a bucket overhead, weighted down with 25% of the castaway's body weight. The castaways would try to hold on to the rod and stop it from spinning, which would unspool the rope. The last man and woman to prevent the rope from unspooling and letting the bucket hit the ground would win.; At the first Individual Immunity Challenge, Denise and Carter took the first Individual Immunities. At Tribal Council, Abi-Maria laid out her perceived betrayal by RC; alliances and the complexities and ramifications of flipping allegiances were then discussed. After the vote was taken, Jonathan pulled out his Hidden Immunity Idol, successfully foiling Jeff Kent's plan to take him out. Still, the plan to split the votes came to fruition, and with the five votes against Jonathan negated, RC was blindsided and sent to be the first member of the Jury.
374	8	"Dead Man Walking"	6.4/10	2.8/8	November 7, 2012	10.31	#16
Jonathan confronted his old Kalabaw alliance about their betrayal against him. With an obvious desire for the new players to vote out the returning players, Michael told Jonathan that they should bide their time and be on the look out for cracks amongst the new players in order to stay in the game longer.: Reward Challenge: The castaways would divide into two teams. One at a time, a castaway from each team would swim out into the ocean to attach a line to a fish trap and then dive down to unhook the trap. The other team members would then pull on the line to bring the fish trap and castaway back to the beach. The teams would repeat this until four traps are retrieved. One castaway would then dig into the sand to retrieve a key which would be used to unlock a frame. Two team members would then use puzzle scroll pieces from the fish traps to assemble a banner. The first team to correctly assemble their banner would win a river cruise and a picnic.; At the Reward Challenge, the team of Denise, Jeff Kent, Jonathan, Lisa, and Malcolm took the win. On day 22, Lisa approached Michael and told him that she had discovered Malcolm's Hidden Immunity Idol. She proposed that they stay loyal to the original core Tandang alliance and blindside Malcolm.: Immunity Challenge: The castaways would race over and under an obstacle course to untie three bags of puzzle pieces. The first three castaways to cross the finish line with their puzzle bags would move on to the second stage. In the second stage, the castaways would use the pieces to assemble the puzzle. The first castaway to complete their puzzle would win.; At the Immunity Challenge, Pete, Jeff Kent, and Jonathan advanced to the second stage after Jonathan dove over the finish line just ahead of Michael. Jonathan then came from behind during the puzzle assembly stage to take a critical Individual Immunity. With Jonathan being immune, the new players all agreed to vote out Michael. Lisa told Pete that Malcolm had the Hidden Immunity Idol and that they should blindside him. Looking for confirmation, Pete confronted Malcolm, who denied it. Pete believed him and instead proposed that they vote out Jeff Kent. Malcolm got agreement from Michael, Jonathan, and Artis to vote out Jeff Kent. Jeff Kent got word that he was a target, and tried to arrange for Pete to be voted out. At Tribal Council, Malcolm said that Lisa threw him under the bus by revealing that he has a Hidden Immunity Idol, which Lisa admitted to. Malcolm, to deter the others from voting against him, pulled out his Hidden Immunity Idol to show the entire tribe and claimed he would play it that night; Abi-Maria also pulled out her Hidden Immunity Idol. Lisa continued to pitch for the core Tandang alliance to stick together, while Jonathan pitched the plan of the core Kalabaw alliance plus Malcolm and Michael to vote out one of the core Tandang members. After the votes were cast, neither Malcolm nor Abi-Maria played their Idol but neither of them needed it as both alliances switched to their backup plans: the Tandang alliance voted for Jeff Kent, while the Kalabaw-Matsing coalition voted against Pete. However, Jonathan was unaware that the plan had changed and voted against Abi-Maria, thus splitting the Kalabaw-Matsing alliance's votes; with all five original Tandang members' votes, Jeff Kent became the second member of the jury.
375	9	"Little Miss Perfect"	6.1/10	2.6/8	November 14, 2012	10.06	#18
Jonathan tried to get Lisa to flip to the Kalabaw side by appealing to her past history and how she would appear to the television audience watching the game. Lisa was unsure if she would stay loyal to Tandang or flip.: Reward Challenge: The tribe would split into two teams of four. One at a time, the castaways would cross a mud obstacle course and dig into a mud pit to retrieve one of four bags filled with three balls. Once all four bags were collected, the team would have to shoot all twelve balls into a basket. The first team to put all twelve balls into the basket would win a trip to a village where the team would have a feast while delivering school supplies and toys.; At the Reward Challenge, the teams were divided by school yard pick with Artis, Lisa, Michael, and Pete going up against Carter, Denise, Jonathan, and Malcolm with Abi-Maria sitting out. The team of Carter, Denise, Jonathan, and Malcolm won by a wide margin when Jonathan dug out all four of his team's bags making it easier for the following team members to complete the obstacle course stage. While the four were on their reward trip, they agreed that they needed to work on Lisa and Michael on changing to their side. Back at camp, Pete wanted to talk to Lisa and Michael about the Tandang alliance situation, but instead Abi-Maria ripped into Lisa for being naive.: Immunity Challenge: The castaways would balance a long wooden paddle on a pivot point. They would then roll a ball along the shaft and try to balance the ball on one of six spots on the paddle. The first castaways to have six balls balanced on the paddle at the same time would win.; At the Immunity Challenge, Michael dominated the challenge to take the win. Denise suggested to her alliance that they vote for Artis to guard against Abi-Maria playing her Hidden Immunity Idol or giving to Pete as she figured that Abi-Maria would be too selfish to give it to Artis. Jonathan continued his appeal to Lisa and also approached Michael about flipping. At Tribal Council, the previous Tribal Council was discussed. Lisa said that she felt that the Kalabaw alliance was more gracious about her big move than her own alliance, but stated that she wanted to stay loyal to her tribe. However, this wasn't good enough for Abi-Maria and she said that she didn't trust Lisa to stay loyal. But when the voting came, Lisa did stay loyal and it was Michael who flipped to the Kalabaw side, blindsiding Artis.
376	10	"Whiners are Wieners"	4.2/7	2.3/8	November 21, 2012	9.37	#21
The day after Tribal Council, Lisa told Abi-Maria that their alliance was off as she felt her time on the island would be better if she were aligned with the former Kalabaw instead of being distrusted by Abi-Maria and Pete.: Reward Challenge: The tribe would be divided into two teams. Two drums, one for each team, would be inside three circled off areas. Facing off one on one, the castaways would run from circle to circle flipping their drum face up while flipping their opponent's drum face down. The castaway would score one point for their team when all three of their drums were face up at the same time. The first team to three points would win a trip to another island where they would enjoy a spa and a feast.; At the Reward Challenge, the team of Abi-Maria, Carter, Malcolm, and Pete beat Denise, Jonathan, Lisa, and Michael. On day 27, Malcolm told Michael that his preferred final four was the two of them along with Denise and Lisa. Michael talked to Lisa about whom she trusted more: Malcolm and Denise or Jonathan and Carter. Lisa said she trusted Jonathan more so they approached Jonathan about going to the final three, but Jonathan did not want to agree to a final three at the time. With Jonathan passing on the opportunity, the group of Denise, Lisa, Malcolm, and Michael agreed to go to the final four together.: Immunity Challenge: In the first round, the castaways would maneuver a buoy through a rope maze. The first five to complete the stage would move on. In the second stage, the castaways would maneuver a buoy along a rope wrapped around a balance beam while staying on the beam. The first three to finish would move on to the final round. In the final round, the castaways would maneuver a buoy through several obstacles in the water. The first castaway to finish would win.; At the Immunity Challenge, Malcolm, Jonathan, Denise, Michael, and Carter moved on to the second round. Michael, Carter, and Denise moved on to the final round where Carter edged Michael for Individual Immunity. The Kalabaw six agreed to split the vote between Abi-Maria and Pete in case that Abi-Maria played her Hidden Immunity Idol. Abi-Maria and Pete tried to stir things up by getting Lisa, Carter, Jonathan, and Michael to flip and vote for Malcolm, but Lisa, Carter, and Jonathan turned them down flat. Michael considered flipping as Malcolm would be a big threat in the game. At Tribal Council, Michael did not flip and the vote was split three votes apiece against Abi-Maria and Pete, but Abi-Maria played her Hidden Immunity Idol. With her votes negated, Pete was sent to the jury.
377	11	"Hell Hath Frozen Over"	6.4/10	2.7/8	November 28, 2012	10.37	#20
On day 29, tree mail contained envelopes with $500 for each castaway, signaling that the day's Reward Challenge would be a Survivor Auction. Money and items won could not be shared. Knowing that she was next to be voted out, Abi-Maria held out of the bidding until she saw a note, which she immediately bid at $500. Carter opted to exchange his baked potato for the bags of rice and beans to feed the entire tribe. Abi-Maria decided that she would try to stir things up in the tribe by feigning that the advantage she won in the game was much more than it really was. She told Malcolm that she was not going to the jury at the next Tribal Council, implying that she had another Hidden Immunity Idol.: Immunity Challenge: At the beginning of each stage, the castaways would be asked a question and if they got it wrong, they would have to carry an extra 5% of their body weight during that and the following stages. In the first stage, the castaways would be attached to a rope and would have to maneuver over and under a hitching post. The first five to complete the stage would move on. In the second stage, the castaways would navigate through a thicket of bamboo poles while attached to a rope. The first two to complete the stage would move on. In the final stage, the castaways would climb a multi-level obstacle and untie rope gates at various points. The first castaway to complete the obstacle would win.; At the Immunity Challenge, she continued this feint when she faked that the note she won at the auction was a two part note. She stated that one part of the note awarded her a double-bye into the final stage of the challenge, and that she would keep the other part to herself. She then tore up the note. Denise and Lisa got the question wrong and added the extra weight to begin the challenge. With five moving on to the second stage, it was only Lisa who was left behind. At the second stage, Denise got her question wrong again, making her extra weight 10%, while Carter and Michael added 5%. Jonathan and Carter moved on to face Abi-Maria in the third stage. Carter got the question wrong again, adding to his burden. Well rested and without any weight, Abi-Maria breezed through the stage to take Individual Immunity. Back at camp, the alliance of Denise, Lisa, Malcolm, and Michael agreed to vote out Jonathan. But Lisa was again wavering and told Jonathan all about the alliance's plans. She told him that she would be staying loyal to her alliance and to do that magic he does to try to save himself. Jonathan told Carter and Abi-Maria that they were going to vote for Denise, so as to circumvent the possibility of Malcolm playing his Idol, and then went to work on lobbying Michael. Jonathan told Michael that Lisa told him everything and that he was the swing vote. At Tribal Council, Jonathan continued to lobby Lisa and Michael to vote out Denise, but his pleas failed and he became the fifth member of the jury.
378	12	"Shot Into Smithereens"	6.4/10	2.9/8	December 5, 2012	10.64	#13
Reward Challenge: Pairing up with their loved ones, the castaways would toss a muddy bag to their loved one. The loved one would then throw the bag at one of five bamboo targets. The first loved one who knocks down all five targets would win an overnight stay by the loved one at camp.; The castaway's loved ones joined them on day 31's Reward Challenge: Michael's son Michael Jr, Carter's mom Bianca, Denise's husband Brad, Lisa's brother Justice, Abi-Maria's mom Vera, and Malcolm's brother Miles. Malcolm and his brother Miles won the challenge. Jeff Probst told Malcolm to pick another castaway and their loved one to stay overnight at camp and he picked Lisa and her brother Justice. Michael then told Malcolm to ask Probst to let him pick another. Probst granted the request and Malcolm selected Michael and his son, also named Michael. While talking with Lisa during the loved ones' overnight stay, Justice reminded her that Survivor was a game and that gave her renewed confidence that she could really play the game. She then planned a second attempt at blindsiding Malcolm by teaming up with Michael, Carter, and Abi-Maria and told her plan to Michael and his son.: Immunity Challenge: Out in the ocean, the castaways would race across a balance beam to a platform. They would then use a hook to retrieve three underwater bags. Once all three bags were retrieved, the castaways would take the bags and swim ashore. They would then untie the bags and use the sticks and ropes contained within to fashion a pole long and strong enough to knock over a target. The first castaway to knock over their target would win.; However, this plan was spoiled when Malcolm won the Immunity Challenge. With the plan spoiled, Lisa and Michael were forced to remain loyal to Malcolm and the alliance of four had to decide between Carter and Abi-Maria. Abi-Maria continued her feint about having a fourth Hidden Immunity Idol. Carter told the alliance of four that they had previously said that they wanted to play with people who deserved to be there instead of who they can beat and that he deserved to be there more than Abi-Maria. At Tribal Council, the alliance of four decided that Carter was too much of threat and he was sent to the jury.
379	13	"Gouge My Eyes Out"	6.3/10	2.8/8	December 12, 2012	10.37	#17
Abi-Maria continued her bluff about having another Hidden Immunity Idol and talked to Lisa about voting out Denise.: Reward Challenge: The castaways would race up and over a slide and run into the ocean to retrieve two bundles of rings. Once the bundles were retrieved, they would toss five rings onto pegs. The first to toss all five rings to the pegs would win a helicopter ride to a boat which would take them to see a whale shark along with pizza and soft drinks.; At the Reward Challenge, Michael took the win and selected Malcolm and Lisa to accompany him on the reward. While on the reward, Malcolm proposed to Lisa and Michael that they go to the final three together. The two agreed, though Lisa kept her options open about making a different alliance. On the morning of day 36, Denise woke up with severe pain on the left side of her neck which she surmised was from a bite.: Immunity Challenge: The castaways would use two planks to cross a rope bridge while collecting two puzzle pieces along the way. If a survivor falls, they would have start the rope bridge part over. Once across, they would use the two pieces to complete a labyrinth maze. The first castaway to complete the labyrinth maze would win.; Denise managed to work through the pain to be competitive in the Immunity Challenge. And despite being the only one to fall off the rope ladder stage of the Immunity Challenge, Malcolm came from far behind during the puzzle assembly stage to take his second Individual Immunity in a row. Back at camp, Abi-Maria talked to Michael about voting out Denise. Afterwards, Michael and Lisa discussed their options of keeping Abi-Maria in the game. Lisa wanted to take Abi-Maria to the final three as she figured that Abi-Maria would not win, but Lisa also wanted to keep Denise around so that the remaining three would have a chance at beating Malcolm in the final Immunity Challenge. At Tribal Council, Abi-Maria continued to pitch to Lisa and Michael that she was their best hope to take to the final three as she couldn't win. But when the vote came, Michael and Lisa stuck to their alliance with Denise and Malcolm and Abi-Maria was sent to the jury.
380	14	"Million Dollar Question"	6.8/10	3.2/8	December 16, 2012	11.46	#12
Reward Challenge: The castaways would run an obstacle course of a balance beam, over a wooden pyramid, a bamboo thicket, a second balance beam, and up a wood ramp to collect three puzzle bags. The castaways would then use the puzzle pieces to assemble a puzzle. The first castaway to finish the puzzle would win an advantage at the final Immunity Challenge.; Day 37's tree mail announced an unexpected Reward Challenge. The challenge was closely contested, with Malcolm edging out Denise. Jeff Probst gave a sealed note with details of the challenge advantage to Malcolm to be opened at the Immunity Challenge. Back at camp, Denise asked Malcolm if he was willing to commit with her to forcing a tie vote between herself and Lisa at the next Tribal Council, but he hesitated in committing to the deal. This made Denise suspicious of Malcolm's loyalty and forced her to strike a deal with Lisa and Michael to vote out Malcolm.: Immunity Challenge: A long wooden dowell rod, about one and a half inches in diameter, was cut into different sized segments. On the center segment a notch has been cut on which rests a metal ball. The castaways would have to hold up the segments by squeezing them between two handles. After five minutes, the contestants were allowed to set the cylinders down and a new round started with two additional segments. After the cylinder was nine segments long, the final round would last as long as the castaways held out. The castaway who held up their segments the longest without allowing the ball to drop from the center segment would win.; Day 38's tree mail announced the traditional journey honoring the castaways voted out before heading to the final Immunity Challenge. Malcolm's sealed note stated that he would be given a mulligan in the challenge. If he were to drop the ball, he would be allowed to replace the ball and resume the challenge. Malcolm quickly used up his second chance when he dropped his ball during the three segment stage. With Malcolm using his second chance, all the castaways reset to redo the three segment stage. Malcolm struggled after the reset and dropped the ball for a second time. With just 30 seconds to go, Denise dropped her ball, leaving Lisa and Michael to fight it out. The two made through the five segment stage and to the seven segment stage, where Lisa finally dropped her ball, giving Michael the win. Back at camp, both Malcolm and Denise made their pitch to Michael and Lisa to keep them in the game. At Tribal Council, the two alliances of Lisa/Michael and Denise/Malcolm and who could win the game were discussed. In the end, Michael and Lisa chose to keep Denise in the game, sending Malcolm to the jury. Denise, Lisa, and Michael enjoyed the traditional day 39 breakfast. Before the three headed to the final Tribal Council, they set their shelter ablaze. At the final Tribal Council, the three made their opening statements to the jury. The jury made their statements to the three and questioned the three about their game play. Artis took his statement to attack the three for betraying alliances. Carter asked Michael why he voted him out. Pete questioned Lisa over her perceived betrayal of the former Tandang members. He questioned Denise about why she played a better game than Lisa or Michael. RC questioned Michael about his role in her being sent to the jury. Malcolm also questioned Denise about why she played a better game than the other two. Jeff Kent asked Michael if he was a person who made things happen, watched things happened, or wonder what just happened. He then asked Lisa to give him examples of her not playing in the middle and being assertive. Abi-Maria asked all three why they deserved her vote. Jonathan spent his time attacking the final three and revealing Lisa's past as a television star to the jury.
381	15	"Reunion"	N/A	2.3/–	December 16, 2012	8.77	N/A
Months later, before the votes were read to cast, Jeff Probst asked for a moment of silence out of respect for the victims of the Sandy Hook shooting which happened two days earlier. The votes from the jurors decided that Denise was the Sole Survivor by a vote of 6–1–1 over Lisa and Michael. The castaways discuss the season with host, Jeff Probst.

== Voting history ==
	Original tribes				Absorbed tribes			Merged tribe							
Episode	1	2	3	4	5		6	7	8	9	10	11	12	13	14
Day	3	6	8	10	12	13	16	19	22	25	27	30	33	36	38
Tribe	Matsing	Matsing	Matsing	Matsing	Kalabaw	Kalabaw	Kalabaw	Dangrayne	Dangrayne	Dangrayne	Dangrayne	Dangrayne	Dangrayne	Dangrayne	Dangrayne
Eliminated	Zane	Roxy	Angie	Russell	Dana	Dawson	Katie	RC	Jeff	Artis	Pete	Jonathan	Carter	Abi-Maria	Malcolm
Votes	5–1	4–1	3–1	2–1	Quit (Note: No vote; Dana chose to quit the game.)	5–1	4–1	4–2–0 (Note: Jonathan played a hidden immunity idol; therefore the five votes cast against him did not count.)	5–4–1	5–4	3–2–0 (Note: Abi-Maria played a hidden immunity idol; therefore the three votes cast against her did not count.)	4–3	5–1	4–1	3–1
Voter	Vote														
Denise	Zane	Roxy	Angie	Russell		Dawson	Katie	~~Jonathan~~	Pete	Artis	~~Abi-Maria~~	Jonathan	Carter	Abi-Maria	Malcolm
Lisa								~~Jonathan~~	Jeff	Jonathan	~~Abi-Maria~~	Jonathan	Carter	Abi-Maria	Malcolm
Michael								~~Jonathan~~	Jeff	Artis	~~Abi-Maria~~	Jonathan	Carter	Abi-Maria	Malcolm
Malcolm	Zane	Roxy	Angie	Russell				~~Jonathan~~	Pete	Artis	Pete	Jonathan	Carter	Abi-Maria	Denise
Abi-Maria								~~Jonathan~~	Jeff	Jonathan	Malcolm	Denise	Carter	Denise	
Carter						Dawson	Katie	RC	Pete	Artis	Pete	Denise	Abi-Maria		
Jonathan						Dawson	Katie	Pete	Abi-Maria	Artis	Pete	Denise			
Pete								RC	Jeff	Jonathan	Malcolm				
Artis								RC	Jeff	Jonathan					
Jeff						Dawson	Katie	RC	Pete						
RC								Pete							
Katie						Dawson	Jonathan								
Dawson						Denise									
Dana					Quit										
Russell	Zane	Roxy	Angie	Malcolm											
Angie	Zane	Roxy	Russell												
Roxy	Zane	Angie													
Zane	Russell														

Jury vote
Episode	15		
Day	39		
Finalist	Denise	Lisa	Michael
Votes	6–1–1		
Juror	Vote		
Malcolm	Yes		
Abi-Maria	Yes		
Carter			Yes
Jonathan	Yes		
Pete	Yes		
Artis	Yes		
Jeff	Yes		
RC		Yes	

== Production ==
=== Casting ===
Participants' applications were due on October 4, 2011, with approximately 800 chosen for interviews in various states. From there, 15 new contestants were selected. With filming beginning in March, it marked the earliest Survivor season filming to date since Survivor: Borneo. The season featured the 15 new castaways competing with three returning castaways who were removed from their previous seasons due to illness or injury: Michael Skupin (passed out into a fire and suffered severe burns to his face and hands) of The Australian Outback, Jonathan Penner (removed due to a serious infection to his knee) originally from Cook Islands and later evacuated in Micronesia, and Russell Swan (removed after blacking out twice due to low blood pressure resulting from dehydration) of Samoa.

== Reception ==
Survivor: Philippines was met with positive reception, especially in comparison to the previous four seasons. Dalton Ross of Entertainment Weekly ranked it as the 13th best season, praising the overall cast and particularly the "strong final four." In 2014, Joe Reid of The Wire ranked it as the 11th-best season, and the highest-rated post-Heroes vs. Villains season, praising the characters of Malcolm, Denise, and Lisa in particular. It was ranked as the 10th-best season by Examiner.com, and the 8th-best season by "The Purple Rock Podcast", which summarized: "The Philippines rescued Survivor from a four-season slump by giving us a strong cast," with "an excellent winner" and "some great storytelling (and narration) along the way." In 2013 and 2014, fan site "Survivor Oz" consistently ranked Philippines as the 9th-best season of the series, with its 2013 position also ranking it as the best post-Heroes vs. Villains season, and summarizing: "Considered 'a breath of fresh air' after a run of seasons that disappointed, it gave us...some great characters and amazing gameplay," which "set the bar high for future seasons." In 2015, a poll on former Survivor contestant Rob Cesternino's website saw Philippines rank as the 8th-greatest season of all time, and the second-greatest post-Heroes vs. Villains season, only behind Survivor: Cagayan; Cesternino himself personally ranked it as the 6th-greatest season overall. This was updated in 2021 during Cesternino's podcast, Survivor All-Time Top 40 Rankings, ranking 11th. In 2020, Inside Survivor ranked this season 10th out of 40 saying "Philippines isn't just a bright spot in the show's darkest era; it's one of the series' overall best seasons. It delivers a near-perfect balance of strong gameplay, vibrant characters, and some of Survivor's best storytelling in its 20 years on the air." In 2024, Nick Caruso of TVLine ranked this season 10th out of 47.
