= All Because of You (Lisa Whelchel album) =

Studio album by Lisa Whelchel
- Released: May 1984
- Recorded: January – February 1984
- Studio: Weddington Studios, North Hollywood, CA. Vocal overdubs recorded at Paramount Recording Hollywood, CA
- Genre: CCM
- Label: Nissi Records, distributed by Sparrow Records
- Producer: John Rosasco

Singles from All Because of You
- 1. "Love Believer" Released: 1984

All Because of You is the debut and only CCM studio album recorded by actress/author Lisa Whelchel, who is known for playing the character Blair Warner on The Facts of Life. Released in May 1984, this album was recorded on the Nissi Records label and was distributed by Sparrow Records.

== Track listing ==
Side 1

1. “Love Believer” (Claire Cloninger, John Rosasco) – 3:42
2. “Just Obey” (Raymond Brown, Rosasco) – 4:06
3. “How High, How Deep, How Wide” (Cloninger, Rosasco) – 4:11
4. “Real Possibility” (Cloninger, Rosasco) – 4:05
5. “Good Girl” (Steve Taylor) – 3:55

Side 2

6. "Shelter” (Don Rogers, Rosasco) – 3:43
7. “Set Me Free” (Rogers, Rosasco) – 4:12
8. “Cover Me, Lord” (Judith Hibbard Cotton, Bruce Hibbard) – 3:52
9. “All Because of You” (Lisa Whelchel, Hibbard) – 3:32
10. “He Sings Me to Sleep” (Cotton, Kelly Willard) – 4:52

== Personnel ==
Credits are adapted from the All Because of You liner notes.

- Lisa Whelchel – lead vocals
- Smitty Price – keyboards
- John Rosasco – keyboards
- Rhett Lawrence – synthesizer programming
- Marty Walsh – guitars
- Leon Gaer – bass
- John Patitucci – bass
- John Ferraro – drums
- Bob Wilson – drums
- Brandon Fields – woodwinds
- Sandy Hall – backing vocals
- Melissa MacKay – backing vocals
- Susan McBride – backing vocals
- Howard McCrary – backing vocals
- Linda McCrary – backing vocals
- Charity McCrary – backing vocals

=== Production ===
- Producer – John Rosasco
- Executive Producer – Bobby Cotton
- Engineers – Wally Grant, Tim Roberstad and Mike Ross.
- Mixing – Bobby Cotton and Wally Grant

== Aftermath ==
The album reached #17 on the Billboard Contemporary Christian Music chart. It also was nominated for a Grammy Award for Best Inspiration Performance, ultimately losing to Donna Summer's "Forgive Me". Whelchel did not record a second album.
