= 1965 in television =

The year 1965 in television involved some significant events. Below is a list of television-related events in 1965.

== Events ==
- January 1 – Comedian Soupy Sales, who hosted the "Lunch With Soupy Sales" children's program on New York City's WNEW-TV, encourages his young viewers to send him money from their parents' pants and pocketbooks and send them to him, and in return he would "send you a postcard from Puerto Rico!" Days later, when he actually got response, he declared that he was joking and that cash contributions would be donated to charity, but WNEW suspended Sales for two weeks over the incident.
- February 22 – A new, videotaped production of the 1957 special Cinderella, by Richard Rodgers and Oscar Hammerstein II, airs on CBS with young Lesley Ann Warren (in the title role) starring alongside Ginger Rogers, Walter Pidgeon, and Celeste Holm.
- March 11 – After months of speculation, Vivian Vance announces she is departing The Lucy Show following the conclusion of its third season. She would return to the series for guest appearances a few years later, a tradition that continued into Lucille Ball's following series, Here's Lucy.
- March 24 – Live TV pictures from the US uncrewed moon probe Ranger 9 are transmitted prior to its impact.
- April 5 – TEN10 opens in Sydney, Australia, with the highlight of the opening night being the variety special TV Spells Magic.
- April 15 – Paul Bryan (Ben Gazzara) gets bad news from his doctor and sets out to do all the things he never had time for, in the Kraft Suspense Theatre episode entitled "Rapture at Two-Forty." This will serve as the pilot for the series Run for Your Life, which will premiere on September 13 and run until 1968.
- April 21 – The Beach Boys appear on Shindig! performing their most recent hit, "Do You Wanna Dance?"
- April 26 – Brazil's largest TV network, Rede Globo, begins broadcasting.
- April 28 – My Name Is Barbra, Barbra Streisand's first TV special, airs on CBS.
- May 2 – The Rolling Stones make their second appearance on The Ed Sullivan Show.
- June 4 – The launch of the Gemini 4 space mission is broadcast in color by NBC. All three networks would carry the launch of Gemini 5 in color that August and all subsequent crewed space launches.
- July 31 - GTV (Ghana) begins as GBC TV, making it the first television station in Ghana.
- August 1 – Cigarette adverts are banned from UK television, though pipe tobacco and cigar adverts continue until 1992.
- August 6 – BBC withdraws a planned airing of The War Game on BBC1's Wednesday Play anthology series; the network, officially, deems the film's depiction of a fictional nuclear attack on the United Kingdom and its aftermath as "too horrifying" to air on television, though it was widely believed that government pressure led to the banning. The film would win the 1966 Academy Award for Documentary Feature, and BBC would not screen the film on-air until 1985.
- September – ABC, CBS, and NBC, begin transitioning a majority of their prime-time programming towards color, with NBC virtually all their programming in color, and ABC and CBS over half of their programs, while keeping some of them in black-and-white due to production costs.
- September 10 – The first National Geographic Special, a chronicle of a 1963 U.S. expedition to Mount Everest, airs on CBS.
- September 12
  - NBC takes over telecasts of the American Football League, with most of the games being broadcast in color.
  - The Beatles appear on The Ed Sullivan Show for the fourth and final time, performing songs from their new album Help!. This appearance was videotaped on August 14 before the group launched their U.S. tour the following night at Shea Stadium (Sunday, August 15, 1965).
- September 13 – Today on NBC goes color.
- September 25 - The Beatles cartoons debut on ABC for 39 episodes through October 21, 1967.
- September 29 - Sistema Nacional de Televisión (as TV Cerro Cora) begins the first television broadcasts in Paraguay.
- October 4 – Pope Paul VI's visit to New York receives saturation television coverage on all three major American television networks. The Papal Mass at Yankee Stadium is broadcast in color.
- October 17 – WBMG-TV in Birmingham, Alabama launches on channel 42, sharing dual CBS/NBC affiliation with crosstown WAPI-TV—and allowing viewers in the Birmingham market to watch more programming from those networks that WAPI did not have room for (including The Ed Sullivan Show, The CBS Evening News, and The Tonight Show). The setup lasts until 1970, when WAPI takes sole affiliation with NBC and WBMG does the same with CBS. At the same time, WCFT-33 in Tuscaloosa and WHMA-40 in Anniston become exclusive affiliates of CBS. Like WBMG, Channels 33 and 40 were dual affiliates of NBC and CBS.
- November 5 – Katie Holstrum (Inger Stevens) and Congressman Glen Morley (William Windom) are married in The Farmer's Daughter episode entitled "To Have and To Hold".
- November 15 – The Huntley-Brinkley Report on NBC goes color on a regular basis, the first network evening newscast to be colorcast nightly.
- November 25 – CBS airs the first color broadcast of an NFL football game, a Thanksgiving Day matchup between the Baltimore Colts and Detroit Lions.
- November 28 – Julie Andrews' first TV special airs on NBC.
- December 4 – TV Guide launches its Montana edition and now covers all of the contiguous U.S. (A Hawaii edition will be launched in 1968.)
- December 9 – A Charlie Brown Christmas premieres on CBS.
- December 21 – A production of The Nutcracker by the New York City Ballet airs on CBS.

Also in 1965

- Three independently affiliated stations in the Philadelphia market—The "Other Big 3 in Philly"—start operations: WIBF (channel 29) opens on May 16; WKBS-TV (channel 48) opens on September 1 (and operates until 1983); and WPHL-TV (channel 17) opens on September 17.
- Motorola introduces the first successful rectangular tube color TV to the mass market.
- Jeopardy! moves to 12:00 noon on NBC, which would make the show a hit on the network for many years.

== Programs/programmes ==
- American Bandstand (1952–1989)
- Another World (1964–1999)
- Armchair Theatre (UK) (1956–1968)
- As the World Turns (1956–2010)
- Ben Casey (1961–1966)
- Bewitched (1964–1972)
- Blue Peter (UK) (1958–present)
- Bonanza (1959–1973)
- Bozo the Clown (1949–present)
- Candid Camera (1948–present)
- Captain Kangaroo (1955–1984)
- Combat! (1962–1967)
- Come Dancing (UK) (1949–1995)
- Coronation Street (UK) (1960–present)
- Crossroads (UK) (1964–1988, 2001–2003)
- Danger Man (UK) (1960–1961, 1964–1966)
- Daniel Boone (1964–1970)
- Days of Our Lives (soap opera) (1965–present)
- Dixon of Dock Green (UK) (1955–1976)
- Doctor Who (UK) (1963–1989, 1996, 2005–present)
- Face the Nation (1954–present)
- Flipper (1964–1967)
- Four Corners (Australia) (1961–present)
- General Hospital (1963–present)
- Get Smart (1965–1970)
- Gidget (1965–1966)
- Gilligan's Island (1964–1967)
- Gomer Pyle, U.S.M.C. (1964–1970)
- Grandstand (UK) (1958–2007)
- Gunsmoke (1955–1975)
- Hallmark Hall of Fame (1951–present)
- Hogan's Heroes (1965-1971)
- I Dream Of Jeannie (1965–1970)
- I Spy (1965-1968)
- It's Academic (1961–present)
- Jeopardy! (1964–1975, 1984–present)
- Jonny Quest (1964–1965)
- Juke Box Jury (1959–1967, 1979, 1989–1990)
- Love of Life (1951–1980)
- Match Game (1962–1969, 1973–1984, 1990–1991, 1998–1999)
- Meet the Press (1947–present)
- Mister Ed (1961–1966)
- My Three Sons (1960–1972)
- Opportunity Knocks (UK) (1956–1978)
- Panorama (UK) (1953–present)
- Petticoat Junction (1963–1970)
- Peyton Place (1964–1969)
- Ready Steady Go! (1963–1966)
- Run for Your Life (1965-1968)
- Search for Tomorrow (1951–1986)
- Shindig! (1964–1966)
- The Addams Family (1964–1966)
- The Adventures of Ozzie and Harriet (1952–1966)
- The Andy Griffith Show (1960–1968)
- The Avengers (UK) (1961–1969)
- The Bell Telephone Hour (1959–1968)
- The Beverly Hillbillies (1962–1971)
- The Dean Martin Show (1965-1974)
- The Dick Van Dyke Show (1961–1966)
- The Doctors (1963–1982)
- The Donna Reed Show (1958–1966)
- The Ed Sullivan Show (1948–1971)
- The Edge of Night (1956–1984)
- The Flintstones (1960–1966)
- The Fulton Sheen Program (1961–1968)
- The Fugitive (1963–67)
- The Good Old Days (UK) (1953–1983)
- The Guiding Light (1952–2009)
- The Hollywood Palace (1964–1970)
- The Late Late Show (Ireland) (1962–present)
- The Lawrence Welk Show (1955–1982)
- The Lucy Show (1962–1968)
- The Man from U.N.C.L.E. (1964–1968)
- The Mavis Bramston Show (Australia) (1964–1968)
- The Mike Douglas Show (1961–1981)
- The Munsters (1964–1966)
- The Patty Duke Show (1963–1966)
- The Saint (UK) (1962–1969)
- The Secret Storm (1954–1974)
- The Sky at Night (UK) (1957–present)
- The Today Show (1952–present)
- The Tonight Show Starring Johnny Carson (1962–1992)
- The Wednesday Play (UK) (1964–1970)
- This Hour Has Seven Days (1964–1966)
- This Is Your Life (UK) (1955–2003)
- Tom and Jerry (1965–1972, 1975–1977, 1980–1982)
- Top of the Pops (UK) (1964–2006)
- Truth or Consequences (1950–1988)
- Walt Disney's Wonderful World of Color (1961–1969)
- What the Papers Say (UK) (1956–2008)
- What's My Line (1950–1967)
- Z-Cars (UK) (1962–1978)

=== Debuts ===
- January 2 – World of Sport on ITV in the UK with Eamonn Andrews as its first host (1965–1985)
- January 2- Večerníček (Czechoslovakia)
- June 28 – Dick Clark's Where the Action Is (1965-1967) on ABC daytime
- September 12 – Hereward the Wake (1965) on BBC1
- September 13 – Run for Your Life (1965-1968) on NBC
- September 14
  - F Troop (1965–1967) on ABC
  - My Mother the Car (1965–1966) on NBC
  - Please Don't Eat the Daisies (1965–1967) on NBC
- September 15
  - Lost in Space (1965–1968) on CBS
  - Green Acres (1965–1971) on CBS
  - The Big Valley (1965–1969) on ABC
  - Gidget (1965–1966) on ABC
  - I Spy (1965–1968) on NBC
- September 16 – The Dean Martin Show (1965–1974) on NBC
- September 17 – The Wild Wild West (1965–1969) and Hogan's Heroes (1965–1971) on CBS
- September 18 – I Dream of Jeannie and Get Smart on NBC (both 1965–1970)
- September 19 – The F.B.I. (1965–1974) on ABC
- September 27
  - Morning Star (1965-1966) on NBC
  - Paradise Bay (1965-1966) on NBC
- September 30 – Thunderbirds on the ITV channel (1965–1966)
- November 8 – The soap opera Days of Our Lives on NBC (1965–present)
- December 20 – game shows Supermarket Sweep (1965–1967) and The Dating Game (1965–1973) on ABC daytime
- Quentin Durgens, M.P. (1965–1969)
- United! on BBC1 in the UK (1965–1967)
- The White Horses as Počitnice v Lipici on RTV Ljubljana in Yugoslavia and as Ferien in Lipizza on Südwestfunk in West Germany (c.1965–1967)

=== Ending this year ===
Date	Show	Debut
January 16	The Outer Limits	1963
March 11	Jonny Quest	1964
March 14	The Porky Pig Show	1964
April 10	Kentucky Jones	1964
April 21	The Cara Williams Show	1964
May 22	The Jack Benny Program	1950
September 3	The Price Is Right	1956
September 22	The Sullavan Brothers	1964
November 9	ABC's Nightlife	1964
December 7	Rawhide	1959

=== Changes of network affiliation ===
Show	Moved from	Moved to
My Three Sons	ABC	CBS
Hazel	NBC	CBS

== Births ==
Date	Name	Notability
January 4	Rick Hearst	Soap opera actor
January 4	Julia Ormond	Actress (Witches of East End)
January 10	Butch Hartman	Director (The Fairly OddParents, Danny Phantom, T.U.F.F. Puppy, Bunsen Is a Beast)
January 11	Teal Marchande	Actress (Kenan and Kel)
January 12	Ali Wentworth	Actress and comedian (In Living Color)
January 14	Jemma Redgrave	Actress
January 14	Mark Addy	English actor (Still Standing)
January 22	DJ Jazzy Jeff	Disc jockey and actor (The Fresh Prince of Bel-Air)
January 22	Diane Lane	Actress (Lonesome Dove)
January 26	Kevin McCarthy	Politician
February 1	Sherilyn Fenn	Actress (Twin Peaks)
February 3	Maura Tierney	Actress (ER, NewsRadio, The Affair)
February 7	Chris Rock	Actor and comedian (Saturday Night Live, The Chris Rock Show)
February 22	John Leslie	TV presenter
February 23	Kristin Davis	Actress (Charlotte on Sex and the City)
February 24	Bas Rutten	Mixed martial artist, kickboxer and wrestler
March 1	Chris Eigeman	Actor (Gilmore Girls)
March 1	Booker T	Commentator and pro wrestler (WCW, TNA, WWE)
March 8	Kenny Smith	NBA basketball player and analyst
March 10	Deezer D	Actor and rapper (ER) (died 2021)
March 11	Wallace Langham	Actor (CSI: Crime Scene Investigation)
March 11	Barbara Alyn Woods	Actress (One Tree Hill)
March 13	Gigi Rice	American actress
March 14	Kevin Williamson	American screenwriter
March 15	Robyn Malcolm	Actress
March 18	David Cubitt	Canadian actor (Medium)
March 21	Cynthia Geary	Actress (Northern Exposure)
March 23	Richard Grieco	Actor (21 Jump Street)
March 23	Wayne Péré	Actor
March 24	Peter Jacobson	Actor (House, Colony)
March 24	The Undertaker	Actor
March 25	Sarah Jessica Parker	Actress (Carrie on Sex and the City)
March 25	Avery Johnson	American basketball coach
March 25	Colin Lane	TV host
March 27	Eric Horsted	Writer
March 30	Juliet Landau	Actress (Buffy the Vampire Slayer, Angel) and daughter of Martin Landau
March 30	Piers Morgan	Television broadcaster
April 1	José Zúñiga	Actor
April 4	Robert Downey Jr.	Actor (Iron Man)
April 9	Mark Pellegrino	Actor (Supernatural, Dexter, Being Human)
April 14	Catherine Dent	Actress
April 16	Martin Lawrence	Actor and comedian (Martin)
April 16	Jon Cryer	Actor (Two and a Half Men)
April 17	William Mapother	Actor (Lost)
April 22	Lauri Hendler	Actress (Gimme a Break!)
April 26	Kevin James	Actor and comedian (Everybody Loves Raymond, The King of Queens, Kevin Can Wait)
April 30	Adrian Pasdar	Actor (Heroes)
May 1	Lee Cowan	Correspondent
May 3	Rob Brydon	Actor
May 6	Leslie Hope	Canadian actress (24)
May 7	Owen Hart	Canadian wrestler (WWF) (died 1999)
May 13	John Anderson	American sports commentator
May 17	Abigail Pogrebin	Writer
May 17	Luann de Lesseps	American television personality
May 23	Melissa McBride	Actress (The Walking Dead)
May 27	Todd Bridges	Actor (Willis on Diff'rent Strokes)
May 27	Zenobia Shroff	Actress and comedienne (Ms. Marvel, The Resident)
May 30	Antoine Fuqua	Actor
May 31	Brooke Shields	Actress (Suddenly Susan) and model
June 4	Vincent Young	Actor (Beverly Hills, 90210)
June 5	Ruth Marshall	Actress
June 5	Tyler Bates	Producer
June 7	Mick Foley	Pro wrestler
June 13	Lisa Vidal	Actress
June 17	Kami Cotler	Actress (The Waltons)
June 18	Kim Dickens	Actress (Deadwood, Treme, Fear the Walking Dead)
June 24	Danielle Spencer	Actress (What's Happening!!, What's Happening Now!!)
June 25	Andrew Dan-Jumbo	Nigerian television presenter
June 29	Matthew Weiner	American television writer
June 30	Mitch Richmond	NBA basketball player
July 1	Tom Hodges	Actor (The Hogan Family)
July 5	Kathryn Erbe	Actress (Oz, Law & Order: Criminal Intent)
July 7	Mo Collins	Actress and comedian (Mad TV)
July 7	Jeremy Kyle	TV presenter (The Jeremy Kyle Show)
July 7	Karen Malina White	Actress (Malcolm & Eddie, The Proud Family)
July 9	David O'Hara	Actor
July 10	Alec Mapa	Actor (Half & Half)
July 16	Daryl Mitchell	Actor (The John Larroquette Show, Veronica's Closet, NCIS: New Orleans)
July 19	Clea Lewis	Actress (Ellen)
July 22	Shawn Michaels	Wrestler (WWE)
July 22	Curt Menefee	TV Host
July 22	Patrick Labyorteaux	Actor (Little House on the Prairie, JAG)
July 23	Slash	British-American guitarist
July 24	Kadeem Hardison	Actor (A Different World, Static Shock)
July 26	Jeremy Piven	Actor (Ellen, Entourage, Mr. Selfridge)
August 4	Crystal Chappell	Actress (Days of Our Lives, One Life to Live, Guiding Light)
August 6	Jeremy Ratchford	Canadian actor (Cold Case)
August 6	David Robinson	NBA basketball player
August 6	Mark Speight	British television presenter (SMart) (died 2008)
August 10	Claudia Christian	Actress (Babylon 5)
August 11	Viola Davis	Actress (How to Get Away with Murder)
August 11	Embeth Davidtz	Actress
August 11	Duane Martin	Actor (All of Us)
August 12	Peter Krause	Actor (Sports Night, Six Feet Under, Parenthood)
August 17	Dottie Pepper	Golfer
August 18	Bob Harper	Trainer
August 19	Kyra Sedgwick	Actress
August 19	Kevin Dillon	Actor
August 24	Marlee Matlin	Actress
August 24	Reggie Miller	NBA basketball player
August 25	Doug Aarniokoski	American television director
August 26	Chris Burke	Actor (Life Goes On)
August 26	Jon Hensley	Actor (As the World Turns, The Bold and the Beautiful)
September 3	Charlie Sheen	Actor (Two and a Half Men) and son of Martin Sheen
September 3	Costas Mandylor	Actor (Picket Fences)
September 9	Charles Esten	Actor (Nashville)
September 9	Dan Majerle	NBA basketball player
September 9	Constance Marie	Actress (George Lopez)
September 14	Michelle Stafford	Actress (The Young and the Restless)
September 16	Lorne Spicer	British presenter (Cash in the Attic)
September 17	Kyle Chandler	Actor (Early Edition, Friday Night Lights)
September 21	Cheryl Hines	Actress (Curb Your Enthusiasm, Suburgatory)
September 25	Scottie Pippen	NBA basketball player
September 28	Scott Fellows	Producer (Johnny Test, Supernoobs, Ned's Declassified School Survival Guide, Big Time Rush)
October 1	Ted King	Actor (Charmed)
October 4	Kathy Wakile	American reality television personality
October 10	Chris Penn	Actor (died 2006)
October 19	Brad Daugherty	NBA basketball player
October 26	Kelly Rowan	Actress (The O.C.)
October 28	Jami Gertz	Actress (Still Standing)
October 30	Charnele Brown	American actress (A Different World)
October 30	Dominique Jennings	Actress (Sunset Beach, Todd McFarlane's Spawn, The Zeta Project)
November 4	Kiersten Warren	Actress (Saved by the Bell: The College Years)
November 7	Mike Henry	Voice actor (Family Guy, The Cleveland Show)
November 20	Jay Bienstock	American television producer
November 21	Alexander Siddig	Actor (Star Trek: Deep Space Nine)
November 25	Cris Carter	NFL football player
November 26	Scott Adsit	Comedian, actor and writer (30 Rock)
November 29	Ellen Cleghorne	Actress and comedian (Saturday Night Live, Cleghorne!)
November 30	Ben Stiller	Actor, comedian and producer (The Ben Stiller Show)
December 3	Steve Harris	Actor (The Practice, The Batman)
December 14	Ted Raimi	Actor (Xena: Warrior Princess)
December 16	J. B. Smoove	Actor
December 19	Jessica Steen	Actress
December 21	Andy Dick	Actor (NewsRadio)
December 22	Jonathan Joss	Actor (King of the Hill, Parks and Recreation) (died 2025)
December 23	Martin Kratt	American zoologist
December 31	Gong Li	Singaporean actress

== Deaths ==
Date	Name	Age	Notability
February 15	Nat King Cole	45	Actor and singer (The Nat King Cole Show)
February 21	Malcolm X	39	Muslim minister and human rights activist
April 27	Edward R. Murrow	57	CBS newsman
July 14	Adlai Stevenson II	65	Diplomat and politician
November 8	Dorothy Kilgallen	52	Journalist and game show panelist (What's My Line?)

== Television debuts ==
- Jenny Agutter – Alexander Graham Bell
- Joe Don Baker – Honey West
- Jane Birkin – Armchair Mystery Theatre
- Jim Brown – Valentine's Day
- Faye Dunaway – Seaway
- Sally Field – Gidget
- Fionnula Flanagan – Knock on Any Door
- Ted Gehring – The Big Valley
- Barbara Hershey – Gidget
- Sally Kirkland – New York Television Theatre
- Jeroen Krabbé – Vrouwtje Bezemsteel
- Frank Langella – The Trials of O'Brien
- Lee Majors – Gunsmoke
- Miriam Margolyes – Theatre 625
- Lynn Redgrave – Sunday Out of Season
- Bo Svenson – Flipper
- Sam Waterston – Dr. Kildare
- Paul Winfield – Perry Mason

== See also ==
- 1965–66 United States network television schedule
