= High School U.S.A. =

1983 television film by Jack Bender and Rod Amateau

- DVD Cover
- Genre: Comedy
- Written by: Alan Eisenstock; Larry Mintz
- Directed by: Rod Amateau
- Starring: Michael J. Fox; Crispin Glover; Nancy McKeon; Todd Bridges; Dana Plato; Angela Cartwright; Anthony Edwards; Bob Denver; Tony Dow; Crystal Bernard; Dwayne Hickman; Lauri Hendler
- Theme music composer: Tony Berg; Miles Goodman
- Country of origin: United States
- Original language: English

Production
- Executive producers: Leonard Hill; Philip Mandelker
- Producers: Alan Eisenstock; Larry Mintz
- Production locations: Covina, California; Excelsior High School – 15711 Pioneer Boulevard, Norwalk, California, USA
- Cinematography: Jack Whitman (director of photography); Hal Trussell (uncredited)
- Editor: John Cortland
- Running time: 96 minutes
- Production company: Hill-Mandelker Films

Original release
- Network: NBC
- Release: October 16, 1983

High School U.S.A. is a 1983 American made-for-television comedy film starring Michael J. Fox, Nancy McKeon, Anthony Edwards, and Crispin Glover, directed by Rod Amateau. The film originally aired on NBC on October 16, 1983.

Several of the main actors appeared in sitcoms that were popular at that time. These include Todd Bridges and Dana Plato from Diff'rent Strokes; Nancy McKeon from The Facts of Life; Lauri Hendler from Gimme a Break!; Crystal Bernard and Cathy Silvers from Happy Days; and Michael J. Fox from Family Ties; as well as a number of former 1950s and 1960s sitcom stars, including Angela Cartwright from The Danny Thomas Show and Lost in Space; Tony Dow, Frank Bank, and Ken Osmond from Leave It to Beaver; Elinor Donahue from Father Knows Best; Bob Denver, Dwayne Hickman and Steve Franken from The Many Loves of Dobie Gillis; and Dawn Wells from Gilligan's Island.

== Plot ==
The film focuses on the intrigue inside Excelsior Union High School, a fictional version of it located in Missouri, as revealed by a license plate closeup. J.J. Manners becomes enamored with Beth Franklin, the girlfriend of Beau Middleton, who somehow manages to be the class president despite alienating most of the school; he is also their football team's quarterback. Middleton is also the richest student, a spoiled young man who drives around in a Porsche 911 convertible.

The core story involves Manners and Middleton competing for the affections of Beth. Ultimately this rivalry culminates in a drag race between the two. The result of the race tips the balance and changes the dynamics within the school irrevocably. In the end, J.J. ends up winning Beth's affections.

Other storylines include a genius, Otto, who has created a robot that he believes to be capable of traveling into space (the robot also humiliates Beau Middleton at the end of the film by pulling down his trousers before the entire student body). Archie Feld is a socially impaired boy who stands out as nervous about interacting with the opposite sex, all while surrounded by friends who all struggle with the intricacies of intergender relationships. Also, Beau Middleton's father has created an incentive for the teachers by offering a sizable reward for the best teacher. Subsequently, the teachers focus extra effort on impressing Beau with their worthiness of the reward.

== Cast ==
- Michael Fox – J.J. Manners
- Nancy McKeon – Beth Franklin
- Todd Bridges – Otto Lipton
- Angela Cartwright – Miss D'Angelo
- Bob Denver – Milton Feld
- Dwayne Hickman – Mr. Plaza
- Lauri Hendler – Nadine
- Dana Plato – Cara Ames
- Crystal Bernard – Anne-Marie Conklin
- Paul Petersen - The Coach
- Anthony Edwards – Beau Middleton
- Frank Bank – Mr. Gerardi
- Elinor Donahue – Mrs. Franklin
- Tony Dow – Principal Pete Kinney
- Steve Franken – Dr. Fritz Hauptmann
- David Nelson – Mr. Krinsky, janitor
- Ken Osmond – Baxter Franklin
- Dawn Wells – Miss Lorilee Lee
- Jon Caliri – Jerry
- David Packer – Danny
- Crispin Glover – Archie Feld
- Cathy Silvers – Peggy
- Kelly Ann Conn – Swoozie
- Jonathan Gries – Dirty Curt
- Barry Livingston – Mr. Sirota
- Jerry Maren – Robot
- Tom Villard – Crazy Leo Bandini
- Kaley Ward – Chris
- Michael Zorek – Chuckie Dipple
- Melody Anderson – Cindy Franklin

== Production ==
=== Casting ===
According to stand-up comedian and future Mystery Science Theater 3000 creator Joel Hodgson, he was asked to be one of the stars of the proposed series based on the movie. Hodgson turned the offer down after telling the network he did not think the material was good. The network raised their offer, thinking his refusal was a bargaining ploy. Because of this experience, Hodgson decided Hollywood was too shallow to work with and quit the industry until 1987, when he created MST3K.

Fox and Glover would go on the following year to work together again in Back to the Future.

=== Filming ===
Fox met McKeon on set and the two of them dated for a while, and starred in another TV movie, Poison Ivy.

== Pilot ==
A one-hour pilot was created due to the success of the original movie, but no longer featuring the star teen actors. It was not picked up by the network, and was aired on May 26, 1984 (the Saturday evening of Memorial Day weekend).

Crystal Bernard, Crispin Glover, Jonathan Gries, Ken Osmond, and Michael Zorek were the only cast members to return for the pilot (with Osmond playing a teacher instead of a parent).

Barbara Billingsley and Jerry Mathers, the only two Leave It to Beaver cast members who weren't in the film, joined the pilot while Dow and Bank did not return. Similarly, David Nelson did not return while his mother and brother (and Ozzie and Harriet co-stars), Harriet Nelson and Ricky Nelson, joined the cast. Other classic TV stars to join included Dick York (from Bewitched), Burt Ward and Julie Newmar (both from Batman).

The pilot marked the last acting roles of Ricky Nelson and Dick York.
