= Jimmy Bridges (actor) =

American actor (born 1960)

- Born: James Daniel Bridges Jr. September 15, 1960 (age 66); San Francisco, California, US
- Other names: James Bridges, J. D. Bridges, Jimi Bridges Jr., Jimi B Jr., James Joshua, James Joshua Bridges
- Occupations: Actor, director, writer, producer
- Years active: 1972–present
- Spouse(s): Barbara Bridges (m. 1989; div. 2009); Amy Beth Diamond (m. 2009; sep. 2018)
- Children: 5

External image
- Jimmy Bridges IMDb photo

James Daniel "Jimmy" Bridges Jr. (born September 15, 1960) is an American actor.

== Early life, family and education ==
Born in San Francisco, California, he is the son of Betty A. Bridges (1941–2024), an actress, manager and acting coach; and James Bridges Sr., a talent agent. His siblings are Todd Bridges (child actor star from the TV series Diff'rent Strokes) and Verda Bridges Prpich. His parents married in 1960 and divorced in 1983.

James Bridges Jr. graduated from Dorsey High School in Crenshaw, Los Angeles, California.

== Career ==
Bridges' acting career was fully in place when he was a teenager. He appeared in numerous television series, usually as a bit player. One of his early roles was in a 1981 episode of the TV series Diff'rent Strokes which starred his brother Todd. He has acted in scores of TV series and films, although most of the films are low budget or straight-to-video. Some of the more prominent TV shows he has performed in are: Good Times, James at 16, Seinfeld, L.A. Law, Falcon Crest, Perfect Strangers, Alias and Days of Our Lives.

He and Todd have a production company, Little Bridge Productions.

== Personal life ==
Bridges resides in North Hills, Los Angeles, California. He has five children, including child actress Brooke Marie Bridges.

He is a bowling enthusiast and has demonstrated his abilities online. He maintains a YouTube channel about bowling, and he also has interest in adult recreational baseball leagues.

== Filmography ==
=== Film ===
| Year | Title | Role | Notes |
|---|---|---|---|
| 1983 | Fire and Ice | Subhuman (voice) | Credited as James Bridges |
| 1987 | Tough Cops | Detective Pete Logan | Credited as Jimi B. Jr. |
| 1987 | Saigon Commandos | Pfc. Will Thomas | Credited as Jimi B. Jr. |
| 1989 | B.O.R.N. | Male Cop | Credited as Jim Bridges |
| 1989 | Wedding Band | A.C.E. | Credited as Jimi B. Jr. |
| 1992 | One False Move | Bobby | Credited as James D. Bridges |
| 1996 | Gangstaz | Marino | Credited as J.D. Bridges |
| 1997 | The Results | Noah | Short film |
| 1997 | A Day in the Life of Mia | Randy | Credited as J.D. Bridges |
| 1998 | The Waterfront | Jimmy James | Credited as James Bridges |
| 2000 | Building Bridges | Inmate #1 | Credited as James Joshua Bridges |
| 2000 | The Thief & the Stripper | J.J. | Credited as James Joshua |
| 2001 | Flossin | Crack Head | |
| 2002 | The Beach House | James | |
| 2002 | Welcome to America | D - Dogg | |
| 2003 | Black Ball | Julian | |
| 2003 | Tapped Out | Mr. King | |
| 2003 | Princess | Melvin (Security Guard) | |
| 2004 | Land of the Free? | Paul | |
| 2005 | Hollywood Horror | | |
| 2007 | Death Row | Terrence Foster | Direct-to-video |
| 2007 | Big Ball'n | Kenny Phillips | Direct-to-video |
| 2007 | Foster Babies | Rico | Direct-to-video |
| 2007 | Frankie D | Jack | |
| 2009 | I Got Five on It Too | Larry Poppins | |
| 2009 | Tom Cool | Preacher Man | |
| 2017 | Jason's Memory | Jason's Father | Short film |
| 2020 | I Got Five on it 3 | Larry Poppins | |
| 2021 | The Runner | Plainclothes Cop Wes | |

=== Television ===
| Year | Title | Role | Notes |
|---|---|---|---|
| 1976 | Good Times | Party Goer | Episode: "The Rent Party"; uncredited |
| 1978 | James at 16 | First Boy / Sam | 2 episodes; credited as James Bridges |
| 1978 | A Woman Called Moses | Young Shadrack Davis | 2 episodes; credited as James Bridges |
| 1978–1985 | ABC Afterschool Specials | Rookie Cop / Jerry | 2 episodes |
| 1979 | What's Happening!! | Ricardo | Episode: "A Present for Dee" |
| 1981 | Diff'rent Strokes | Joe Patterson | Episode: "The Team"; credited as James Bridges Jr. |
| 1983 | The Kid with the 200 I.Q. | Student | TV movie; scenes deleted |
| 1983 | Knight Rider | Roller Skater | Episode: "Nobody Does It Better"; uncredited |
| 1983 | Days of Our Lives | Crazy J | Episode: "Episode #1.4528" |
| 1984 | Fame | Eddie | Episode: "A Way of Winning"; credited as Jim Bridges |
| 1984 | Hardcastle and McCormick | Davey | Episode: "Scared Stiff" |
| 1984 | It Came Upon the Midnight Clear | Paramedic 2 | TV movie |
| 1984 | Divorce Court | Daniel Beamon Jr. | Episode: "Beamon vs. Beamon" |
| 1985 | The Insiders | Orderly | Episode: "High Iron" |
| 1986 | One Big Family | Kid #1 | Episode: "Image Breaker"; credited as Jimi B. Jr. |
| 1986 | A Year in the Life | Batter | Episode: "Springtime/Autumn"; credited as Jimi B. Jr. |
| 1987 | Falcon Crest | Copy Boy | Episode: "Across the Bridge"; credited as Jim Bridges Jr. |
| 1987 | Home | 1st Kid | TV movie |
| 1988 | Mathnet | Ambrose | Episode: "The View from the Rear Terrace"; credited as Jimi Bridges Jr. |
| 1989 | L.A. Law | Suspect | Episode: "To Live and Diet in L.A."; credited as Jimi Bridges Jr. |
| 1989 | Perfect Strangers | Calvin | Episode: "Blind Alley"; credited as Jimi Bridges Jr. |
| 1989 | China Beach | Patient #3 | Episode: "Skin Deep"; credited as Jimi Bridges Jr. |
| 1989 | Hunter | Counterman | Episode: "On Air"; credited as Jimi Bridges Jr. |
| 1990 | Labor of Love | John Simmons | TV movie; credited as Jimi Bridges Jr. |
| 1991 | ABC Weekend Specials | Rod | Episode: "Ralph S. Mouse"; credited as Jimi Bridges Jr. |
| 1993 | Beverly Hills, 90210 | Party Rental Guy | Episode: "Twenty Years Ago Today"; credited as J.D. Bridges |
| 1995 | Seinfeld | Paramedic | Episode: "The Jimmy"; credited as J.D. Bridges |
| 1995 | Tyson | Carl King | TV movie |
| 1998 | Sliders | Doctor #2 | Episode: "California Reich"; credited as James Joshua |
| 2004 | Alias | DOJ Agent | Episode: "Hourglass"; credited as James D. Bridges |
| 2005 | Jane Doe: Vanishing Act | Airfield Federal Agent | TV movie; credited as James Bridges |
| 2005 | Jane Doe: Now You See It, Now You Don't | Federal Agent | TV movie; uncredited |
| 2005 | Gone But Not Forgotten | Lawyer in Hallway | TV movie; uncredited |
| 2008 | Finish Line | F.B.I. Agent | TV movie; credited as James Bridges |
| 2008 | Generation Gap | Pallbearer at funeral | TV movie |
| 2009 | Mrs. Washington Goes to Smith | Basketball Referee | TV movie |
| 2009 | Citizen Jane | Officer Cahill | TV movie; credited as James Bridges |
| 2018 | Shameless | Gerard | Episode: "Mo White!" |
