= List of Diff'rent Strokes characters =

This is a list of characters from the NBC and ABC sitcom Diff'rent Strokes.

== Main characters table ==
Character	Portrayed by	Seasons								Ep
Character	Portrayed by	1	2	3	4	5	6	7	8	Ep
Phillip Drummond	Conrad Bain	Main	Main	Main	Main	Main	Main	Main	Main	All
Arnold Jackson	Gary Coleman	Main	Main	Main	Main	Main	Main	Main	Main	184
Willis Jackson	Todd Bridges	Main	Main	Main	Main	Main	Main	Main	Main	169
Kimberly Drummond	Dana Plato	Main	Main	Main	Main	Main	Main	Recurring	Recurring	140
Edna Garrett	Charlotte Rae	Main	Main				Guest			31
Pearl Gallagher	Mary Jo Catlett					Recurring	Main	Main	Main	56
Sam McKinney	Danny Cooksey						Recurring	Main	Main	48
Maggie McKinney-Drummond	Dixie Carter						Recurring	Main		26
Maggie McKinney-Drummond	Mary Ann Mobley								Main	11

== Phillip Drummond ==
Phillip Drummond
- First appearance: "Movin' In"
- Last appearance: "I, Done" (Part 2) (Fresh Prince of Bel-Air)
- Portrayed by: Conrad Bain

In-universe information
- Gender: Male
- Occupation: Investor
- Spouses: Lydia Drummond (died); Maggie McKinney Drummond (1984–)
- Children: Kimberly Drummond (daughter); Willis Jackson (adopted son); Arnold Jackson (adopted son); Sam McKinney (stepson)
- Relatives: Mrs. Drummond (mother); Mr. Drummond (father); Sophia Drummond (sister); Anna Van Drummond (cousin); Hans Van Drummond (nephew/Anna's son)
- Nationality: American

Phillip Drummond was portrayed by Conrad Bain. He is a friendly, wealthy white widower, who runs Trans-Allied, Incorporated. He was born December 3, 1931, in Manhattan, New York. (This made him Conrad Bain's junior by eight years.)

Phillip has a daughter, Kimberly, and two adopted African American sons, Willis and his younger brother Arnold Jackson. He also has an eccentric elder sister named Sophia (played by Dody Goodman). Arnold and Willis' mother, Lucy Jackson (portrayed by Todd Bridges' real-life mother), worked as a housekeeper for the Drummonds years ago; her death-bed wish was that Phillip would take care of her two sons. In the series pilot, Phillip welcomes Arnold and Willis into his home.

Phillip had dated several women, and would later get remarried to Maggie McKinney, a television aerobics instructor (played by Dixie Carter from 1983 to 1985 and Mary Ann Mobley from 1985 to 1986). Maggie subsequently introduced Sam McKinney (Danny Cooksey), her son from a previous marriage, to the family.

Phillip Drummond is the only character to appear in every episode of the series.

Phillip, along with Arnold Jackson, made a cameo in the Fresh Prince of Bel-Air series finale "I, Done," as a potential buyer of the Banks' mansion.

On The Facts of Life, Philip appears in the first episode of the first season, Rough Housing.

== Kimberly Drummond ==
Kimberly Drummond
- First appearance: Movin' In
- Last appearance: Bulimia
- Portrayed by: Dana Plato

In-universe information
- Alias: Kim Drummond
- Gender: Female
- Family: Phillip Drummond (father); Lydia Drummond (mother; deceased); Arnold Jackson (adopted brother); Willis Jackson (adopted brother); Sam McKinney (stepbrother); Maggie McKinney Drummond (stepmother)
- Nationality: American

Kimberly Drummond was portrayed by Dana Plato. She was the only biological child and daughter of wealthy widower, Phillip Drummond (Conrad Bain). She was born on Park Avenue in New York City on October 22, 1966. Kimberly was shown as a caring, loving big sister to both Willis and Arnold, but as a wealthy, coming of age teenager, she suffered from various problems. Several such instances took place in season 6, one of which involved a two-part "very special" episode on the dangers of hitchhiking, where she was nearly a victim of sexual assault by a deranged man named Bill (Woody Eney). In another episode, no one in the family knew that she was suffering from bulimia, though she later admitted to having a problem and agreed to seek help.

Kimberly wasn't in the opening credits in the 7th season nor the 8th season, however, in the 8th season, there were clips of her and she is shown in the last frame of the opening credits for the 8th season.

On The Facts of Life, Kimberly appears in Rough Housing.

== Arnold Jackson ==
Arnold Jackson
- First appearance: "Movin' In"
- Last appearance: "I, Done" (The Fresh Prince of Bel-Air)
- Portrayed by: Gary Coleman

In-universe information
- Gender: Male
- Family: Lucy Mae Jackson (mother) (1938–1977); Henry Jackson (father) (d. 1975); Phillip Drummond (adopted father); Kimberly Drummond (adopted sister); Willis Jackson (older brother); Sam McKinney (stepbrother); Maggie McKinney Drummond (stepmother); Myrtle Waters (distant cousin)
- Nationality: American

Arnold Jackson was portrayed by Gary Coleman. He was the younger brother of Willis Jackson (Todd Bridges), and was born in Harlem, New York City on July 19, 1971. Arnold is a "precocious moppet," who was practically known for his catch phrase, "Whatchoo talkin' 'bout?", which became a part of popular culture and in 2006 was included in TV Land's "The 100 Greatest TV Quotes and Catch Phrases" special.

Arnold's father died in 1975, and his mother died in 1977. His mother worked as a housekeeper for a wealthy white widower, named Philip Drummond (Conrad Bain). Before her death, his mother expressed her wish for her two boys to be cared for by Mr. Drummond. He agreed, and in 1979, he officially adopted Willis and Arnold.

Arnold is the main character in the series. In many episodes, he is shown as being a selfish younger brother, or coming up with or being suckered into some scheme to keep out of trouble or obtain his desire of the episode. When the boys first move in with Mr. Drummond, Willis wants to move back to Harlem, while Arnold is satisfied with their new surroundings. Willis eventually changes his mind, and they decide to stay with "Mr. D.," as the boys initially refer to him. When Philip adopted them and they call him Dad.

In another episode, Arnold has to fight a school bully named "The Gooch," so that he will not pick on him anymore. However, Mr. Drummond does not want Arnold fighting the bully, and ultimately decides that Arnold must make peace with "The Gooch." Arnold, however, listens to his brother, Willis, who tells him to fight back. This ended with Arnold getting a black eye, and both boys getting in trouble.

Arnold's best friend is Dudley Johnson (played by TV actor Shavar Ross), who, like Arnold, was adopted. Dudley appears in many episodes, and both are involved in various schemes throughout the series. Steven Mond played Robbie Jayson, Arnold's other best friend, who once pressured him to try drugs. In one episode, Arnold has to have an appendectomy, but is too scared to see the doctor.

Arnold, along with Phillip Drummond, made a cameo in the Fresh Prince of Bel-Air series finale, as potential buyers of the Banks' mansion.

On The Facts of Life, Arnold appears in Rough Housing and in The New Girl: Part 1.

== Willis Jackson ==
Willis Jackson
- First appearance: "Movin In"
- Last appearance: "The Big Bribe"
- Portrayed by: Todd Bridges

In-universe information
- Gender: Male
- Occupation: High school/college student
- Family: Lucy Mae Jackson (mother, 1938–1977); Henry Jackson (father, d. 1975); Arnold Jackson (younger brother); Kimberly Drummond (adopted sister); Phillip Drummond (adopted father); Sam McKinney (stepbrother); Maggie McKinney Drummond (stepmother); Myrtle Waters (distant cousin)
- Nationality: American

Willis Jackson was portrayed by Todd Bridges. He was the older brother of Arnold. He was born in Harlem on April 27, 1967. The boys' late mother, Lucy, was a housekeeper for a wealthy White man, named Phillip Drummond, and her deathbed wish was that he would take care of her two kids, and Philip Drummond officially adopted them in 1979. Willis's catch phrase is "Say what?"

Willis was portrayed alternately as rebellious and responsible. In one episode, Willis joins a gang named "The Tarantulas."

Willis also had a girlfriend, named Charlene DuPrey, portrayed by Janet Jackson of both the television shows Good Times and Fame. Jackson appeared from the show's third season (1980–1981) until 1984, through the show's sixth season.

Bridges' role as Willis Jackson started to fade, because of casting changes in the 1984–1985 season, when Danny Cooksey was added as Sam McKinney, his and Arnold's new younger stepbrother. Bridges did not appear as often in the show's final season, though his name remained in the opening credits.

On The Facts of Life, Willis appears in Rough Housing and in Bought and Sold.

== Edna Garrett ==
Edna Garrett was portrayed by Charlotte Rae. She was Mr. Drummond's housekeeper from 1978 to 1979. She left the show midway through the second season to take a job as housemother and dietitian at Eastland School, the school Kimberly attends in Peekskill, New York. She returned as a guest star in the wedding episode.

== Maggie McKinney-Drummond ==
Maggie McKinney-Drummond was portrayed by Dixie Carter for seasons 6-7, and when the show moved from NBC to ABC for season 8, Mary Ann Mobley took over the role. Carter and Mobley would star opposite each other in the season 5 premiere of Designing Women, "A Blast From The Past."
