= Bentley Mitchum =

American actor (born 1967)

- Born: February 22, 1967 (age 59); Tucson, Arizona, U.S.
- Occupations: Actor, film director, screenwriter
- Years active: 1985–present
- Spouses: Samra Wolfin (m. 1990; div. 1996) Noelle Balfour (m. 1997; div. 2003) Jaime Anstead (m. 2004; div. 2014)
- Children: 2
- Parent(s): Christopher Mitchum; Cindy Davis
- Relatives: Robert Mitchum (grandfather); Julie Mitchum (great aunt); John Mitchum (great uncle); James Mitchum (uncle)

Bentley Mitchum (born February 22, 1967) is an American actor who has appeared in about 40 films and TV series, including Sundance grand jury prize winner Ruby in Paradise, The Man in the Moon, The Wonder Years, Conviction, Susie Q, Meatballs 4 and Demonic Toys and Shark Attack.

Bentley also became the first American actor to play lead in an Indian Tamil film, Little John opposite Jyothika.

== Personal life ==
Bentley is the grandson of actor Robert Mitchum, the son of Cindy Davis and actor Christopher Mitchum and the nephew of actor James Mitchum. His acting debut was with them in a TV movie, Promises to Keep, in which the three actors played characters with corresponding relationships. Bentley attended USC and received a Bachelor of Fine Arts in drama. He also started a band called The Velvet Box.

Bentley has two daughters, Allexanne Mitchum, from his marriage to Samra Wolfin, and Carrington Mitchum, from his marriage to Jaime Anstead.

His daughter Allexanne dated Steve Bing. She died on July 4, 2019. Six months after her death, LA coroner Dr. Dutra determined Allexanne had died from fentanyl poisoning, most likely given to her by a friend in the form of a fake Xanax.

== Selected filmography ==
| Year | Title | Role | Notes |
|---|---|---|---|
| 1985 | Promises to Keep | Johnny Palmer | TV film, co-starring with his father Christopher Mitchum and grandfather Robert Mitchum |
| 1988–89 | The Wonder Years | Brian Cooper | 3 Episodes: Pilot, "Swingers" and "How I'm Spending My Summer Vacation" |
| 1989 | Gummibärchen küßt man nicht | Tony | German film |
| 1991 | The Man in the Moon | Billy Sanders | |
| 1991 | Rich Girl | Scott | |
| 1991 | The Borrower | Kip | |
| 1991 | Sometimes They Come Back | David North | TV film |
| 1992 | Demonic Toys | Mark Wayne | |
| 1992 | Meatballs 4 | Kyle Linck | |
| 1993 | Teenage Bonnie and Klepto Clyde | Kirk | |
| 1993 | Ruby in Paradise | Ricky Chambers | |
| 1996 | Susie Q | Johnny Angel | TV film |
| 1997 | Different Strokes | Jack | |
| 1999 | Lima: Breaking the Silence | Bruce Nelson | |
| 1999 | Shark Attack | Dr. Miles Craven | |
| 2000 | Delta Force One: The Lost Patrol | Sgt. Don Nichols | |
| 2001 | Little John | John McKenzie | Indian film; Shot in Tamil, Hindi and English |
| 2001 | A Crack in the Floor | Johnny | |
| 2002 | Frogmen Operation Stormbringer | Andreas Drassos / Casper | |
| 2005 | Walker, Texas Ranger: Trial by Fire | Lab Technician | TV film |
| 2007 | Walking Tall: The Payback | Walter Morris | TV film |
| 2014 | The One | Vampire Brother | Short; Nominated — International Fashion Film Award for Best Actor in a Leading Role (La Jolla International Fashion Film Festival) |
