= Little John (film) =

2001 film by Singeetam Srinivasa Rao

- Lobby card for English version
- Directed by: Singeetam Srinivasa Rao
- Screenplay by: Singeetam Srinivasa Rao
- Story by: Singeetam Srinivasa Rao
- Dialogue by: Crazy Mohan (Tamil); Sushma Ahuja (Hindi); Mark Zaslove (English)
- Produced by: Sujatha; M. Varadaraja; K. Maniprasad
- Starring: Bentley Mitchum; Jyothika; Anupam Kher; Nassar
- Cinematography: Tirru
- Edited by: N. P. Satish
- Music by: Pravin Mani
- Production company: Media Dreams
- Distributed by: Singeetam Movies
- Release date: 13 April 2001
- Running time: 126 minutes
- Country: India
- Languages: Tamil; Hindi; English

Little John is a 2001 Indian fantasy film written, executive produced and directed by Singeetam Srinivasa Rao. Bentley Mitchum and Jyothika play the lead roles with Anupam Kher, and Nassar playing supporting roles. The film was simultaneously shot in Tamil, English, and Hindi languages. Pravin Mani composed the music for the project. The film opened to above average reviews and did moderate business at the box office.

== Plot ==
The film opens with a mythical story in which the goddess Parvathi while performing dance with her husband Lord Shiva drops her Mookuththi on the Earth and because of which a temple was raised named "Mookuththi Amman temple" in Tamil Nadu, India. The nose stud has many powers in it and so an evil powered soul named "Kaalabhairavan" / "Kalabhairav" (Prakash Raj) waits one thousand years patiently to capture it.

John McKenzie (Bentley Mitchum), a US student from Pittsburgh, Pennsylvania comes to stay in his Tamil friend Vasu's home to research the Mookuththi Amman temple. He later visits the temple and learns the myth through the temple's key person Swami Paramananda aka "Swamiji" (Anupam Kher) and a leaf which guides them to protect the Mookuthi from evil powers which is visible only to him and not to John. John does not believe the story but whatever he sees directly. Meanwhile, he develops a love for Vasu's sister Vani (Jyothika), to which Vasu's parents do not agree.

Meanwhile, Kalabhairavan wakes up from his long patience and captures the Mookuththi by hypnotizing one of his faithful servants. But the Mookuththi does not allow itself to go out of the temple and hides in a snake hill inside the temple. John is charged for the theft of the Mookuththi and arrested by police despite Swamiji's repeated words that he did not steal it. John escapes from police custody and seeks the help of Swamiji. Swamiji throws powder on him with an intention of making him invisible but John turns to a miniature man.

Swamiji is arrested on the charge of concealing someone charged with a crime. John seeks Vani's help and they go to the police station with John in her pocket. Swamiji instructs him that the Mookuththi should be placed back in Amman's nose by that day's sunset else John will be 'Little John' forever. John takes away the Mookuththi from snake hill. Meanwhile, Kalabhairavan attempts to capture the Mookuththi. After several struggles between evil and divine, John places the Mookuthithi in Amman's nose, destroying Kalabhairavan. John gets back to his normal size and unites with Vani.

== Cast ==
Actor (Tamil version)	Actor (English/Hindi)	Role (Tamil)	Role (English/Hindi)
Bentley Mitchum		John McKenzie	John McKenzie
Jyothika		Vani	Vani
Anupam Kher		Swami Paramananda aka Swamiji	Swami Paramananda aka Swamiji
Nassar		Inspector Vijay	Inspector Vijay
Mohan Ram	Anjan Srivastav	Vishwanath (Vani's father)	Vishwanath (Vani's father)
Fathima Babu	Bharati Achrekar	Nirmala (Vani's mother)	Nirmala (Vani's mother)
Ash Chandler		DIG Kumar	DIG Kumar
Prakash Raj		Kaala Bhairavan	Kala Bhairav
R. S. Sivaji		Police constable	Police constable
Laxmi Rattan		Lal (Kumar's father)	Lal (Kumar's father)
Mayilsamy		Kabali (Driver)	Kabali (Driver)
Master Yogesh		Jijo (Vani's brother)	Jijo (Vani's brother)
U. B. G. Menon		Sundaresan (Nirmala's father)	Surendra (Nirmala's father)
Kallu Chidambaram		Bakshi (Kala's disciple)	Bakshi (Kala's disciple)

== Production ==
In the late 1990s, director Singeetham Srinivasa Rao was asked by a producer to make a Hollywood film called Five and Half Hours to Dawn with many special effects and Rao went to Los Angeles and even engaged a casting director. But when the chance bypassed him, it led to an opportunity to make Little John which would star an American lead actor. Bentley Mitchum, an American actor best known for being the grandson of Robert Mitchum, was cast in the lead role while Jyothika was signed on to play the heroine. The American actor revealed he was surprised that he made it through his audition and had never watched an Indian film and only had read Rao's resume. The project was made as a trilingual in Tamil, Hindi, and English and was shot thrice, although the English version had no songs. The Tamil version starred Mohan Ram and Fathima Babu as Jyothika's parents while the English and Hindi versions featured Anjan Srivastav and Bharati Achrekar as her parents, respectively. Ash Chandler, an English speaking comedian of Indian descent, was also selected to play a role in the film. Prakash Raj was also roped in to play the role of Kalabhairava, revealing he had to sit before the makeup man from 5 am to get ready for a 9 am shot.

The film was produced by Media Dreams, who at the time were also producing Kamal Haasan's Pammal K. Sambandam as well as the Shankar project, Robot in 2002. Crazy Mohan, Sushma Ahuja and Mark Jaslov wrote the dialogues for the Tamil, Hindi and English versions respectively. Mitchum's voice was dubbed by playback singer, Devan Ekambaram.

== Soundtrack ==
Little John

Soundtrack album by Pravin Mani
- Released: 9 March 2001
- Genre: Feature film soundtrack
- Label: Saregama

Pravin Mani chronology
Little John (2001)	Ottran (2003)

The film's music composed by Pravin Mani. The lyrics for Tamil version was written by Vairamuthu and lyrics for Hindi version was written by Javed Akhtar.

=== Tamil track list ===
Track-list
No.	Title	Singer(s)	Length
1.	"Lady Don't Treat Me"	Srinivas, Sujatha
2.	"Paadava Paadava"	Sujatha
3.	"Laila Laila"	Pravin Mani, Vasundhara Das
4.	"Jagamengum"	Srinivas
5.	"Baila Re Baila"	Clinton Cerejo, K. S. Chithra, Gopi
6.	"Gone Case"	Hansel & Gretel
7.	"Paadava Paadava"	KK

=== Hindi track list ===
Track-list
No.	Title	Singer(s)	Length
1.	"Hey Hey Tum Ho"	Srinivas, K. S. Chithra
2.	"Aaj Main Gavoon 1"	Alka Yagnik
3.	"Laila Laila"	Pravin Mani, Vasundhara Das
4.	"Jag Hai Chidi"	Shankar Mahadevan
5.	"Baila Re Baila"	Clinton Cerejo, K. S. Chithra, Gopi
6.	"Gone Case"	Hansel & Gretel
7.	"Jung Hai"	Shankar Mahadevan
8.	"Aaj Main Gavoon 2"	Sujatha

== Reception ==
The film won above average reviews, with The New Straits Times wrote that the "movie is good in two aspects: its fantastic hit songs and real graphics", while about the performances the critic writes that "Mitchum is charming and likeable" and "Jyothika looks sweet with her new make-up". However, another reviewer mentioned that "it seems like a film meant for children. But then the director seems to have under-estimated the intelligence level of his targeted audience. Thiru's cinematography is a plus point for the film." Visual Dasan of Kalki called it "average". Cinesouth wrote "There is no clue about the venue where the incidents in the story happen. Much is left to make out and imagine about the background of the story line. The screenplay does not provide for many scenes that inculcate interest in the minds of viewers. Hence the weakness of the film in parts".
