= Dana Plato =

American actress (1964–1999)

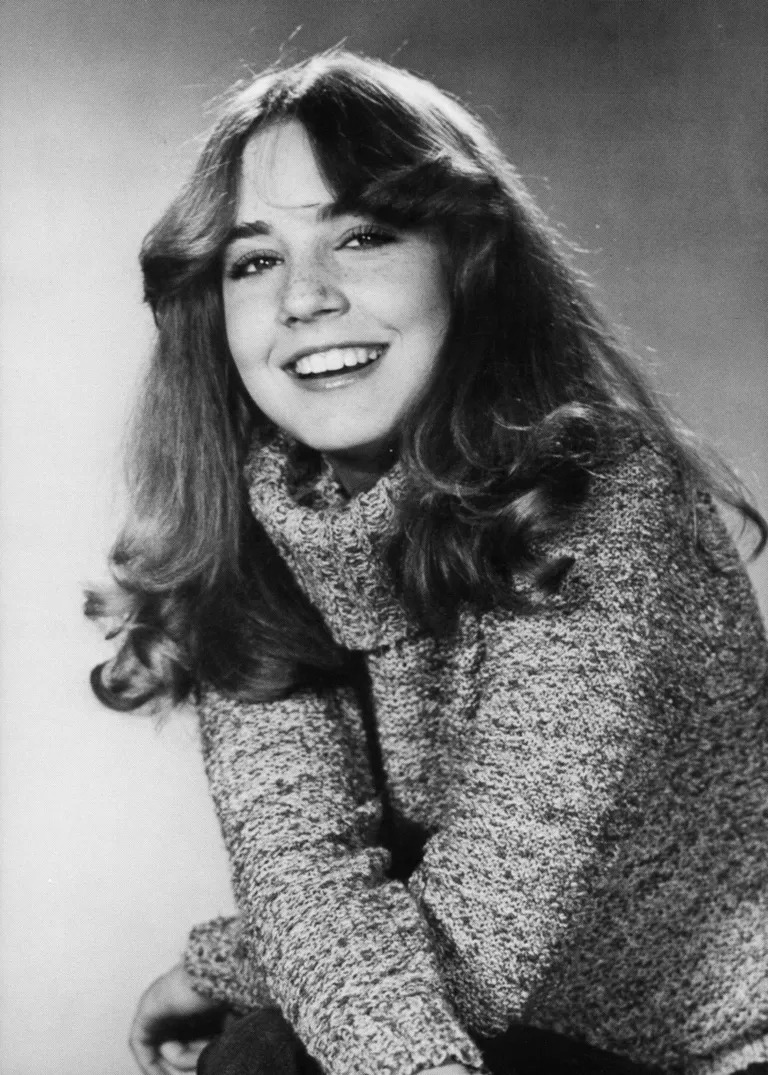
- Plato in 1985
- Born: Dana Michelle Strain; November 7, 1964; Huntington Park, California, U.S.
- Died: May 8, 1999 (aged 34); Moore, Oklahoma, U.S.
- Occupation: Actress
- Years active: 1975–1999
- Known for: Role of Kimberly Drummond on Diff'rent Strokes
- Spouses: Lanny Lambert (m. 1984; div. 1990) Scott Atkins (m. 1996; ann. 1996)
- Children: 1

Dana Michelle Plato (née Strain; November 7, 1964 – May 8, 1999) was an American actress. She rose to fame for playing Kimberly Drummond on the sitcom Diff'rent Strokes (1978–1986), which established her as a teen idol of the late 1970s and early 1980s.

Plato was born to a teen mother and was adopted as an infant. She was raised in the San Fernando Valley and trained in figure skating before turning to acting. Her acting career began with numerous commercial appearances, and her television debut came at the age of ten with a brief appearance on the television series The Six Million Dollar Man (1975). She then appeared in the horror film Return to Boggy Creek (1977) and the Oscar–winning film California Suite (1978). In recognition for her tenure on Diff'rent Strokes, she received nominations for a Young Artist Award and two TV Land Awards. Following the show, she worked sporadically in independent films and B movies, and appeared in the video game Night Trap (1992).

Plato was married twice and she had a child in 1984 during her marriage to guitarist Lanny Lambert. She struggled with substance abuse for most of her life. She was arrested in 1991 for robbing a video store, and again the following year for forging a drug prescription. On May 8, 1999, at age 34, Plato was found dead in her motor home from an overdose of prescription drugs. Her death, initially considered accidental, was ruled a suicide.

== Early life ==
Plato was born Dana Michelle Strain on November 7, 1964, at Mission Hospital in Huntington Park, California. Her birth mother was Linda Strain, a teenager who was already caring for an 18-month-old child. She was of German and Irish descent. In June 1965, at seven months old, she was adopted by Dean Plato, a Dutch-born émigré who owned a trucking company, and his wife Florine "Kay" Plato (née Schwartz). She was raised in the San Fernando Valley. When she was three, her adoptive parents divorced and she lived with her mother.

In 1995, during an appearance on the psychology-focused Marilyn Kagan Show alongside co-star Todd Bridges, she spoke of her childhood with her mother, stating: "My mother made sure that I was normal. The only thing that she did, the mistake she made, was that she kept me in a plastic bubble. So, I didn't learn about reality and life skills." Kagan suggested that Plato may have been used for a free meal ticket, which Plato denied, explaining that her mother's ways were so that she would not become a prima donna.

== Career ==
At a young age, Plato began attending auditions with her mother, and by the age of seven had appeared in over 100 television commercials. She was also an accomplished figure skater who initially trained for a potential spot on the Olympic team.

Plato made her acting debut at the age of 10, making a brief appearance on the ABC television show The Six Million Dollar Man. She then starred in the 1975 made-for-television film Beyond the Bermuda Triangle. Plato made her film debut at the age of 13 in the uncredited role of Sandra Phalor in the horror film Exorcist II: The Heretic (1977). She starred as Evie Joe in the horror film Return to Boggy Creek in the same year. Both films were received negatively by critics. Better received was the family-comedy film California Suite (1978), in which Plato played Jenny Warren; the film was also a commercial success, and earned accolades at the Academy Awards and the Golden Globe Awards.

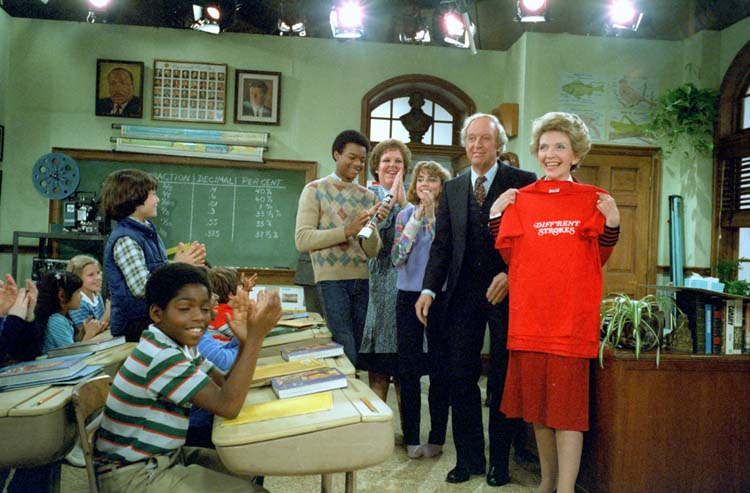
The cast of Diff'rent Strokes with guest star Nancy Reagan on set in 1983

When Plato made a brief appearance on The Gong Show, she was spotted by a producer who helped cast her as Kimberly Drummond, the older sister of adopted brothers Arnold and Willis Jackson, on the NBC/ABC sitcom Diff'rent Strokes. The series debuted in 1978 and became an immediate hit. Plato appeared regularly on the show throughout its run, notably top-billed for four years. She was nominated for a Young Artist Award for her work on the program, and also was part of two TV Land Award nominations given to its cast.

In 1984, following the birth of her son Tyler, Plato was dismissed from her starring role due both to her pregnancy and to struggles in her personal life, which producers felt would negatively impact their "wholesome family comedy". She made a one-episode appearance on season 8 episode 12 of "The Love Boat". Thereafter, Plato appeared recurringly on Diff'rent Strokes from 1985 to 1986 when the show ended; in season 8, the episode that aired on January 17, 1986, was Plato's final appearance on the show, which showed her character suffering from bulimia. CBC News described her performance in the episode as a "series highpoint".

In 1981, Plato appeared in the television special A Step in Time, which earned her a second Young Artist Award nomination. In 1983, she starred in the television film High School U.S.A. as Cara Ames, alongside Diff'rent Strokes co-star Todd Bridges, who played Otto Lipton. In spite of the film receiving mixed reviews from critics and viewers alike, it gained popularity at the time of its premiere, particularly for its cast. Plato attempted to establish herself as a serious actress, but found it difficult to achieve success.

She had breast implants and modeled for a June 1989 Playboy pictorial. She also started taking roles in such B movies as Bikini Beach Race (1992) and Lethal Cowboy (1995). In 1990 she made a brief attempt at a musical career, sponsored by producer Howie Rice. She recorded six tracks with songwriter/producer Daniel Liston Keller at Paramount Studios in Hollywood, California, but the recordings were shelved and not released.

Plato starred in the video game Night Trap (1992), becoming one of the first celebrities to appear in a video game. Though the game was released in 1992, all of its footage was captured in 1987. She was eager to work on the project, and Rob Fulop, one of the designers of Night Trap, said that he and Plato had enjoyed working together. She made little effort to hide the fact that the project was a step-down from the work she had previously done. The game was a moderate success, and is considered a pioneering title because it was the first to use live actors. Night Trap received mixed to negative reviews upon release, and in retrospect has continued to polarize critics and audiences. It is best remembered for the controversy it created over the violence and sexuality that, along with Mortal Kombat, eventually led to the creation of the Entertainment Software Rating Board (ESRB).

Toward the end of her career, Plato chose roles that were erotic; she appeared nude in Prime Suspect (1989) and Compelling Evidence (1995), and in the softcore erotic drama Different Strokes: The Story of Jack and Jill...and Jill (1998), the title of which was changed after filming had been completed in order to tie it to Plato's past. That same year, following her appearance in the film, Plato appeared in a cover story of the lesbian lifestyle-magazine Girlfriends.

Plato's last works include Desperation Boulevard (1998), in which she appears as herself and which appears to be based on her life; Silent Scream (1999), in which she appears as Emma Jones; and Pacino Is Missing (2002), which was released after her death, in which she appears as an attorney.

== Personal life and legal troubles ==
During her years on Diff'rent Strokes, Plato struggled with drug and alcohol problems; she admitted to drinking alcohol, using cannabis and cocaine, and suffered an overdose of diazepam when she was aged 14.

In December 1983, Plato moved in with her boyfriend, rock guitarist Lanny Lambert. The couple married on April 24, 1984. Their only child, a son, was born on July 2, 1984. When it was revealed that she was pregnant, she was written out of Diff'rent Strokes. Her co-star Conrad Bain revealed that she was happy about her baby, stating in an interview with People magazine: "She deliberately got pregnant while doing the series, when I spoke to her about it, she was enthusiastic about having done that... [saying that] 'When I get the baby, I will never be alone again.'"

Plato separated from Lambert in January 1988, the same week her mother died of scleroderma. In desperation, she signed over power of attorney to an unscrupulous accountant who disappeared with the majority of her money, leaving her with less than $150,000 ($410,232 in 2025). She claimed the accountant was never found or prosecuted despite an exhaustive search, and that he had stolen more than $11 million from other clients. In her March 1990 divorce, Plato lost custody of her son to Lambert and was given visitation rights.

Plato then became engaged to Fred Potts, a filmmaker, but the romance was short lived and their engagement ended. She was later married to actor and producer Scott Atkins (Scotty Gelt) in Vancouver for one month, but the marriage was annulled. Plato got engaged to her manager Robert Menchaca, six years her junior, with whom she lived in a Winnebago motor home in Navarre, Florida. She later moved back to Las Vegas, where she struggled with poverty and unemployment. At one point she worked as a cashier at a dry-cleaning store, where customers reported being impressed by her friendly lack of airs.

On February 28, 1991, Plato entered a Las Vegas video store, produced a pellet gun that looked extremely realistic, and demanded the money in the cash register. After she left with the money, the flabbergasted clerk called 9-1-1 and said, "I've just been robbed by the girl who played Kimberly on Diff'rent Strokes." Approximately fifteen minutes after the robbery, Plato returned to the scene after dropping a pair of sunglasses and was immediately arrested. She had stolen $164, (about $397 to $400 in 2026 adjusted for inflation). Entertainer Wayne Newton posted her $13,000 bail and instead of prison time Plato was given five years' probation. In January 1992, Plato was arrested for forging a prescription for diazepam. She served thirty days in jail for violating the terms of her probation and immediately entered a drug rehabilitation program.

On May 7, 1999, Plato appeared on The Howard Stern Show. She spoke about her life, discussing her financial problems and past run-ins with the law. She admitted to being a recovering alcoholic and drug addict, but claimed she had been sober for more than ten years and was not using any drugs, with the exception of prescribed painkillers due to the recent extraction of her wisdom teeth. Many callers to the show insulted Plato and questioned her sobriety, which elicited angry responses from her, and she defiantly offered to take a drug test on the air. Some callers, as well as host Howard Stern, came to Plato's defense, though Stern also referred to himself as "an enabler" and sarcastically offered Plato drugs. Although she allowed a hair to be cut for the test, Stern later claimed she asked for it back after the interview.

== Death ==
On May 8, 1999, Plato and Menchaca were returning to California and stopped at Menchaca's mother's home in Moore, Oklahoma, for a Mother's Day visit. Later on in the visit, Plato said that she felt unwell and took a few doses of a hydrocodone / acetaminophen painkiller (Lortab), along with the muscle-relaxant carisoprodol (Soma), and went to lie down with Menchaca, inside her Winnebago recreational vehicle, which was parked outside the house. Carisoprodol and hydrocodone are known to have major drug interactions that can lead to serious side effects, including profound sedation, respiratory distress, coma, and even death.

Upon awakening, Menchaca and the family discovered that Plato had died in her sleep at the age of 34. It was initially believed to be an accidental overdose, but was later ruled a suicide based on Plato's long history of substance abuse and past suicidal behavior. Some of Plato's friends and associates, including her former Diff'rent Strokes co-star Todd Bridges, have publicly disagreed with the medical examiner's ruling, with Bridges stating that Plato had consumed the fatal cocktail of drugs in an ambiguous amount in order to fall asleep. Plato's body was cremated. Her ashes were scattered over the Pacific Ocean.

== Legacy ==
Plato became a subject of the national debate surrounding troubled child stars, particularly given the difficulties of her Diff'rent Strokes co-stars Todd Bridges and Gary Coleman.

In 2000, Fox broadcast a television movie based on Plato, titled After Diff'rent Strokes: When the Laughter Stopped. The film was focused on her life and work after the show, including her death. It featured actors who at the time were unknown, as well as Bridges, who made a cameo appearance. In 2006, NBC aired the television film Behind the Camera: The Unauthorized Story of Diff'rent Strokes, which was based on the lives of the child stars who had worked on the show. Bridges and Coleman appear at the end of the film standing near Plato's grave.

On May 6, 2010, her son Tyler died by suicide. He was 25 years old. According to those close to Lambert, he struggled to come to terms with Plato's death. Mother's Day was always difficult for him. On November 7, 2019, on what would have been Plato's 55th birthday, Bridges commented on Twitter about their friendship, leaving a tribute to Plato: "You were the one person I could always talk to. You were one of my best friends. I will never forget you and love you forever. HAPPY BIRTHDAY Dana Plato R.I.P you are free my friend."

== Filmography ==
=== Film ===
List of films and roles
Year	Title	Role	Notes
1977	Exorcist II: The Heretic	Sandra Phalor	Uncredited
1977	Return to Boggy Creek	Evie Joe	
1978	California Suite	Jenny Warren	
1989	Prime Suspect	Diana Masters	
1992	Bikini Beach Race	J.D.	
1992	The Sounds of Silence	Deborah Nichols	
1995	Compelling Evidence	Dana Fields	
1995	Lethal Cowboy	Elizabeth	
1995	Millennium Day		
1997	Tiger	Andrea Baker	
1997	Blade Boxer	Rita	Direct-to-video film
1998	Different Strokes: The Story of Jack and Jill...and Jill	Jill Martin	
1998	Desperation Boulevard	Herself	
1999	Silent Scream	Emma Jones	
2002	Pacino Is Missing	Prosecuting Attorney	Posthumous release

=== Television ===
List of television appearances and roles
Year	Title	Role	Notes
1975	The Six Million Dollar Man	Girl	Episode: "The Bionic Woman"
1975	Beyond the Bermuda Triangle	Wendy	Television film
1976	Family	Mary Beth Sanders	Episode: "Home Movie"
1978	What Really Happened to the Class of '65?	Herself	Episode: "The Most Likely to Succeed"
1978	The Gong Show	Herself	Game show
1978–86	Diff'rent Strokes	Kimberly Drummond	Main role (season 1–6); recurring role (season 7–8)
1979	Hello, Larry	Kimberly Drummond	3 episodes
1979	The Facts of Life	Kimberly Drummond	Episode: "Rough Housing"
1979–80	CHiPs	Herself	2 episodes
1980	Family	Debbie	Episode: "Letting Go"
1980	ABC Afterschool Specials	Daisy Dallenger	Episode: "Schoolboy Father"
1981	A Step in Time	Herself	Television film
1982	The Family Life	Naomi	Episode "The Kids are Moving In"
1982	Walt Disney World's 10th Anniversary	Daughter	Television special
1983	High School U.S.A.	Cara Ames	Television film
1984	The Love Boat	Patty Springer	Episode: "Paying the Piper/Baby Sister/Help Wanted"
1985	Growing Pains	Lisa	Episode: "Mike's Madonna Story"

=== Video games ===
- Night Trap (1992) as Kelli Medd

== Accolades ==
List of awards and nominations received by Dana Plato
Association	Year (Note: Indicates the year of ceremony. Each year is linked to the article about the awards held that year, wherever possible.)	Category	Work	Result	Ref.
Young Artist Awards	1981	Best Young Actress in a Television Special	A Step in Time	Nominated	
Young Artist Awards	1983	Best Young Actress in a Comedy Series	Diff'rent Strokes	Nominated	
TV Land Awards	2003	Quintessential Non-Traditional Family (shared with cast)	Diff'rent Strokes	Nominated	
TV Land Awards	2004	Quintessential Non-Traditional Family	Diff'rent Strokes	Nominated	
