= Different Strokes (film) =

1997 film directed by Michael Paul Girard

- Directed by: Michael Paul Girard
- Written by: Michael Paul Girard
- Produced by: Robert Giordano
- Starring: Dana Plato; Landon Hall; Bentley Mitchum; Samantha James
- Cinematography: Gerald M. Williams
- Edited by: H. Kim
- Production company: Coastline Films
- Distributed by: Coastline Films; SFM Entertainment; The Kushner-Locke Company
- Release date: June 25, 1998
- Running time: 88 minutes 75 minutes (Edited version)
- Country: United States
- Language: English

Different Strokes (also titled Different Strokes: The Story of Jack and Jill...and Jill) is a 1998 erotic drama film about a love triangle involving a young couple and another woman. Written and directed by Michael Paul Girard, the film stars Dana Plato, Landon Hall and Bentley Mitchum. The film's title is an allusion to Plato's fame from the TV series, Diff'rent Strokes. It was Plato's first film appearance since 1992, and her second to last film before her death in 1999.

Nathan Rabin gave the film a harsh review, stating, "The shamelessly titled Different Strokes (...) lacks anything resembling even community-theater-level acting", concluding the film "is notable mainly for its aggressive lack of shame. From its title to its threadbare plot to its community-access-level production values, the film reeks of crass exploitation."

== Cast ==
- Dana Plato as Jill Martin
- Bentley Mitchum as Jack
- Landon Hall as Jill
- David Millbern as Rick
- Gabriella Hall as Alicia
- Michelle Trongone as Katy
- Samantha James as Model
- Erica Gold as Model
- Jilda Trolio as Model
- Noelle Balfour as Model
- B. Daniel Martinez as Officer Fernandez
