= Return to Boggy Creek =

- Theatrical release poster
- Directed by: Tom Moore
- Written by: John David Woody
- Starring: Dawn Wells; Dana Plato; David Sobiesk
- Cinematography: Robert Bethard
- Edited by: Jerry Caraway
- Music by: Darrell Deck
- Production company: Bayou Productions
- Distributed by: Dimension Pictures
- Release date: December 23, 1977
- Running time: 85 minutes
- Country: United States
- Language: English

Return to Boggy Creek is a 1977 adventure/horror film directed by Tom Moore. It is an unofficial sequel to The Legend of Boggy Creek and stars Dawn Wells and Dana Plato. Wells portrays the mother of three children who become lost in the swamp during a hurricane until the creature comes to their rescue.

The film carries over none of the original's docudrama elements. It was followed by three films, Boggy Creek II: And the Legend Continues (1985), the only true sequel to the original film, Boggy Creek (2011) and The Legacy of Boggy Creek (2011). The latter two were released straight-to-video.

== Plot ==
Three children go out on a kayak in frequent ventures out into the bottomlands of southern Arkansas, near Boggy Creek, to go fishing. Elder sister Evie-Jo (Dana Plato), a big fan of Nancy Drew and the Hardy Boys with mystery solving, her little brother and skeptic John-Paul (David Sobiesk); and their younger mute friend T-Fish (Marcus Claudel). Setting up and checking fishing traps with their grandfather's secret formula to attracting fish they nicknamed "Cat-Fish Kool-Aid", they notice quite a few traps are empty with the bait taken, and suspect someone stole it. After getting more, they venture back out to the riverway but are warned that a hurricane is coming soon later in the week and that the bottomland has many dangers. Several of the older folks in town whisper of a ape-like monster they call "Big Bay-Ty". Rumor has it amongst some that the creature, very much real, was responsible for the death of Evie-Jo and John-Paul's father.

In the lead up to the day of the fishing competition, a motorist and his family passing by Boggy Creek catch a glimpse of a large, hairy figure wandering in the riverways. Initially thinking it a bear, they notice it's walking upright and bipedally over long distance and realize it has a human-like shape. Back in town, the children had managed to win the fishing competition thanks to a last minute catch. The motorist comes in to inquire about the creature and many a frightened statement is made of Big Bay-Ty, who had never been caught but it seems everyone has either glimpsed, run into, or lost livestock to the monster's raids. The motorist hires a volunteering fisherman as a guide to find and either kill or capture the beast on film.

Later that day in the bottomlands whilst the children are rechecking their remaining baited lines and discovering more had been looted without catching a fish, T-Fish has a frightening run in with Big-Bay-Ty. He runs back to his friends, who also flee with him when they hear the monster's haunting howls echo through the forest. Back at home safely and swearing to not speak of what happened, Evie-Jo makes note that Big-Bay-Ty could have easily captured or harmed them if they wanted to. Asking her mother what happened to her father and if the creature really did kill him, her remaining parent laments that no such thing happened and Big-Bay-Ty's involvement was an idea her father-in-law conceived in his grief. She instead believes that her late husband, not respecting the many dangers of the swamp, was sadly taken by his own hubris.

The motorist and fisherman guide travel deep into the woods to search for Big Bay-Ty, at the former's urging despite the caution of an oncoming hurricane. The children secretly follow them, but get separated in the hurricane. Little do they know a hurricane is about to commence. While fleeing the storm and hearing Big Bay-Ty's howls in the distance, they discover an abandoned fishing shack filled with food scraps and their missing "Cat-Fish Kool-Aid" bottles. Confused why Big Bay-Ty seems to lurk about the abode and not "go home" due to the storm, the children realize they are in the monster's residence. The two men are injured and knocked unconscious by falling debris and their boat drifts over, with the children deciding they have to attempt a rescue and help them. Looking for anything useful Big Bay-Ty might have scavenged, John-Paul discovers a tacklebox that belonged to him and Evie-Jo's father containing his final diary entries. The passages confirm their mother's suspicions and that their father died from a careless snake bite, not Big Bay-Ty's doing and the presence of the box implies the creature might have tried to help him but was too late.

Big Bay-Ty approaches again and the children hide with the still-unconscious men in their boat. But to their surprise, Big Bay-Ty reveals himself to be a benevolent beast, bravely towing the boat through the storm to get the kids back near their home and safety. Big Bay-Ty leaves them in the morning, where the children awaken and are reunited with their parents and hailed as heroes. The motorist, having heard an unknown animal call before getting knocked out during the storm, asks the children if they saw or heard any monsters. Evie-Jo giggles and confers there's no monsters around, implying she wants to keep Big Bay-Ty safe from probing searches as the creature doesn't mean anyone any harm.

== Cast ==
- Dawn Wells as Jolene
- Dana Plato as Evie Jo
- David Sobiesk as John Paul
- Marcus Claudel as T-Fish
- Louis Belaire as The Monster

== Reception ==
On his website Fantastic Movie Musings and Ramblings, Dave Sindelar gave the film a negative review, calling it "an unoriginal and silly story that is not particularly well written and with highly variable acting". Joseph A. Ziemba from Bleeding Skull.com offered the film similar criticism, stating that, although it featured some nice cinematography, it was ruined by poor acting, inept dialogue, "annoying greasy kids’ stuff" and poor pacing. TV Guide awarded the film 1/5 stars, calling it "A fairly harmless kiddie outing".
