= Todd Bridges =

American actor (born 1965)

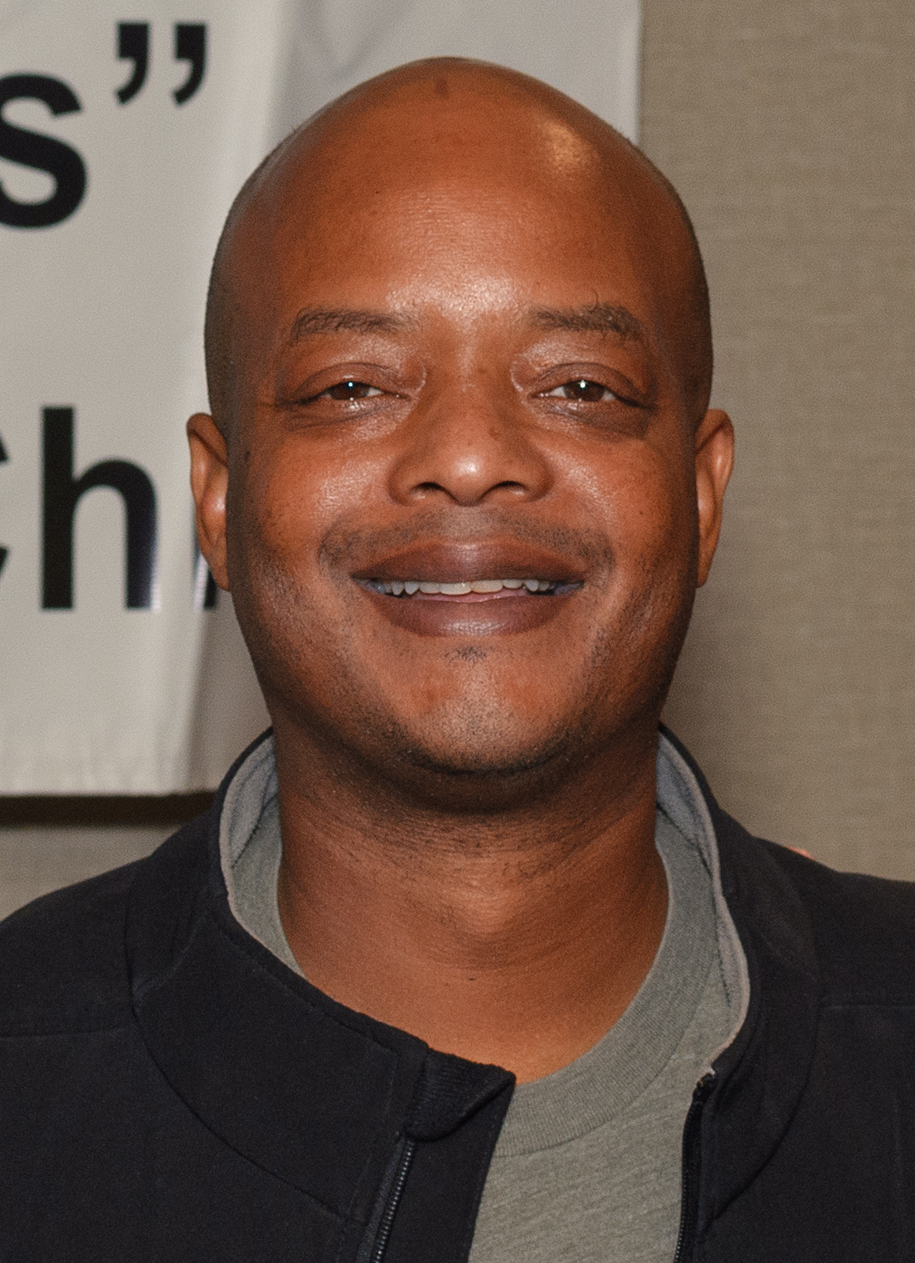
- Bridges at the Chiller Theatre Expo in 2017
- Born: Todd Anthony Bridges; May 27, 1965 (age 61); San Francisco, California, U.S.
- Occupation: Actor
- Years active: 1974–present
- Known for: Role of Willis Jackson on Diff'rent Strokes
- Spouse(s): Dori Smith (divorced) Bettijo Hirschi (m. 2022–2026)
- Children: 2
- Relatives: Jimmy Bridges (brother); Verda Bridges (sister)

Todd Anthony Bridges (born May 27, 1965) is an American actor. He portrayed Willis Jackson on the sitcom Diff'rent Strokes and had a recurring role as Monk on the sitcom Everybody Hates Chris. Bridges worked as a commentator on the television series World's Dumbest... from 2008 to 2013.

== Early life ==
Bridges was born on May 27, 1965, in San Francisco, California, the son of Betty Alice Pryor, an actress, director, and manager, and James Bridges Sr., a talent agent. His brother Jimmy Bridges and sister Verda Bridges are also actors.

== Career ==
=== Television ===
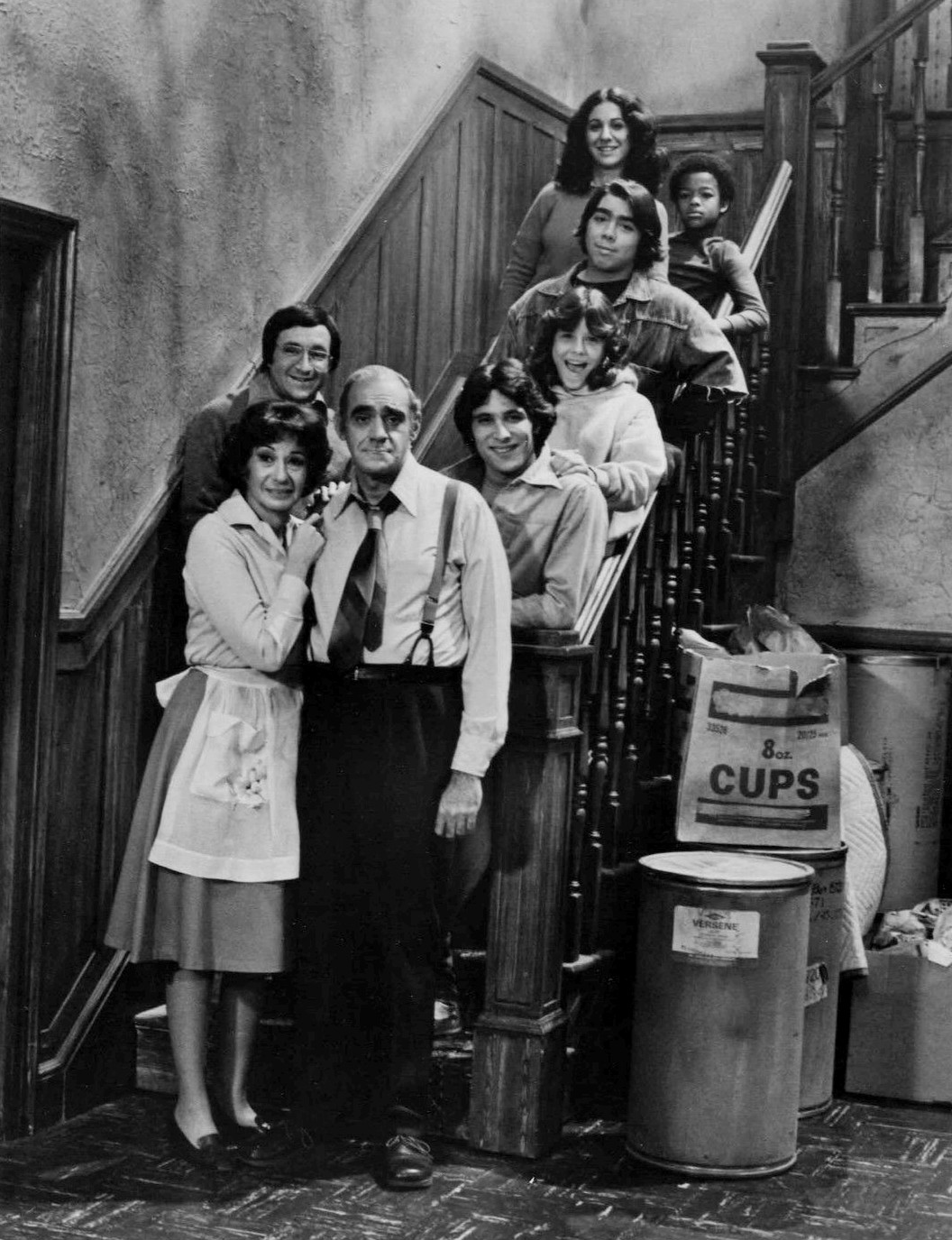
Bridges (at top right) with the cast of Fish, 1977

Bridges appeared on The Waltons, Little House on the Prairie, The Love Boat Season 2 Episode 5, and the landmark miniseries Roots. He was a regular on the Barney Miller spinoff Fish. It was playing Willis Jackson on the NBC/ABC sitcom Diff'rent Strokes that made him a household name, along with those of fellow co-stars Conrad Bain, Charlotte Rae, Dana Plato, and Gary Coleman. With Rae's death in 2018, Bridges became the last surviving original cast member.

Bridges appeared in the 2002 special Celebrity Boxing with friend Vanilla Ice, whom he defeated. In 2006, Bridges appeared as a contestant on a celebrity episode of Fear Factor but was eliminated after the first stunt. Also in 2006, he appeared as a contestant on the Fox reality show Skating with Celebrities but was eliminated in the second episode of the show because he was using roller skates instead of ice skates. In January 2007, he appeared as a member of the "mob" on the American version of the game show 1 vs. 100. He and his wife Dori Bridges appeared in the November 14, 2007 episode of the MyNetworkTV show Decision House titled "Burned Bridges." He also had a recurring role as Monk on the UPN/The CW sitcom Everybody Hates Chris.

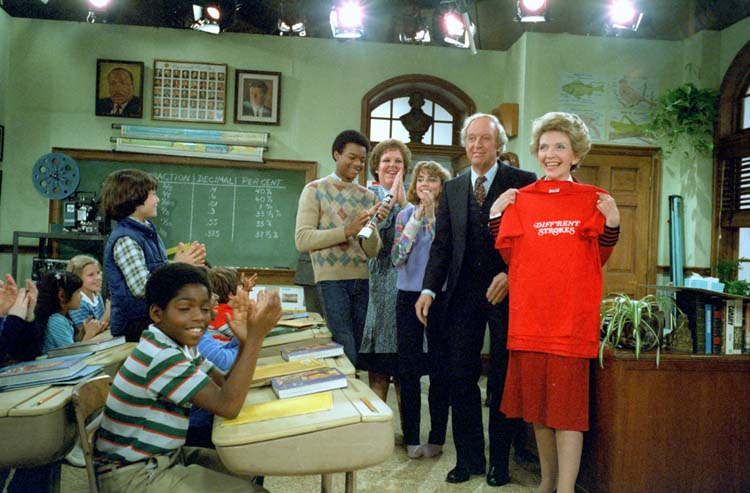
The cast of Diff'rent Strokes with guest star Nancy Reagan in 1983

In March 2008, Bridges appeared on TruTV Presents: World's Dumbest..., on which he appeared throughout the show’s run. That October, he debuted as a contestant on Hulk Hogan's Celebrity Championship Wrestling on CMT as a member of Team Beefcake (coached by former wrestler Brutus "The Barber" Beefcake). Bridges' wrestling persona was the character Mr. Not So Perfect. In one episode, he defeated Tonya Harding with a lead pipe. The judges praised him for his athleticism and his cunning in his defeat of Harding. After reaching the finals along with Butterbean and Dustin Diamond, Bridges was defeated by Dennis Rodman. In 2015, Bridges was the host of a live game show titled Lovers or Losers: The Game Show at the Plaza Hotel & Casino in Las Vegas. In 2022, Bridges was announced as a HouseGuest competing in the third season of Celebrity Big Brother.

=== Music videos ===
Bridges has appeared in several music videos. His first appearance was in Penny Ford's single "Change Your Wicked Ways" (1984). He made a cameo in Moby's 2002 music video for "We Are All Made of Stars" and in the video for the Black Keys' 2011 single "Howlin' for You."

== Personal life ==
Bridges has a daughter, Bo, from an early relationship. Bridges' son, Spencir Bridges (born July 15, 1998) from his marriage to former wife Dori Bridges (née Smith), is also a former child actor who appeared in the film Daddy Day Camp and an episode of iCarly.

In 1998, Bridges and his brother James saved the life of Stella Kline, a 51-year-old paraplegic woman who nearly drowned when her wheelchair rolled into a lake while she was fishing. Kline said: "I was thanking God that he was there and you know, everybody's been saying nothing but bad stuff about Todd Bridges on the news and in the papers... He has a heart of gold." Bridges remarked: "We felt God put us there at the right time to save this lady's life, because there was no one else around."

In a 2010 appearance on The Oprah Winfrey Show, Bridges said that he was sexually abused at age 11 by a publicist who was also a family friend.

On September 25, 2022, he married designer Bettijo Hirschi. On January 14, 2026, Bridges announced that he and Hirschi had separated.

=== Legal and criminal problems ===
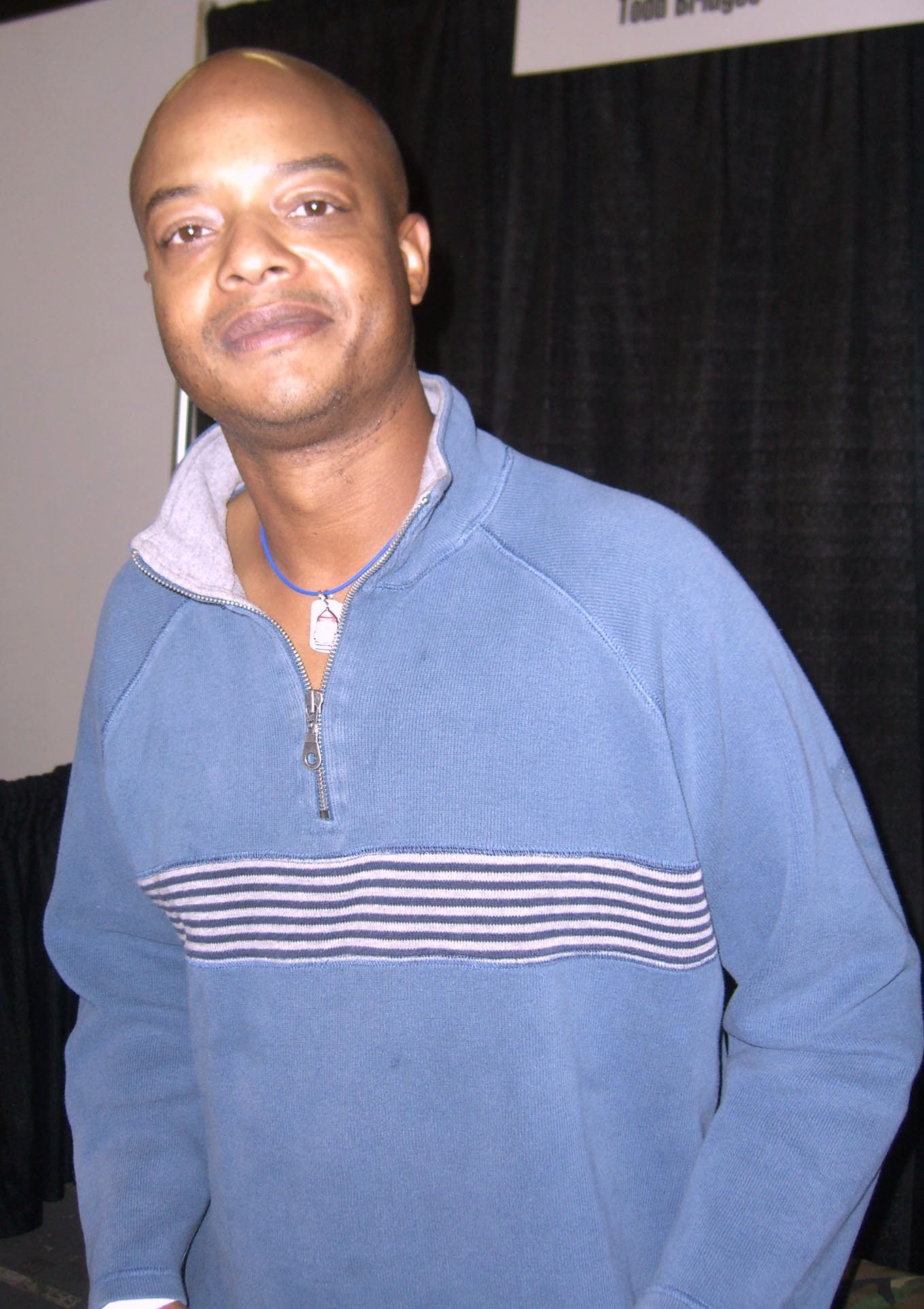
Bridges in 2012

In his twenties, Bridges battled a crack cocaine and methamphetamine addiction. He bought and sold drugs to support his habit. Bridges was arrested for felony assault and cocaine possession.

In 1983, Bridges was fined $240 for carrying a concealed firearm. In 1987, he received a suspended sentence after pleading no contest to the charge of making a bomb threat.

In 1989, Bridges was arrested and tried for the attempted murder of Kenneth "Tex" Clay, a Los Angeles-area drug dealer who prosecutors argued had been shot by Bridges. Bridges pleaded not guilty and was represented by the famous defense attorney Johnnie Cochran, who argued that Bridges was an abused minor who had been driven to drugs by an exploitative entertainment industry and was now being framed. A witness further testified that Bridges was not present at the shooting, and Bridges was acquitted of all charges by a jury.

Bridges was arrested on December 29, 1992, on suspicion of transporting narcotics for sale and for the possession of a loaded firearm after Burbank, California police officers discovered methamphetamines and a loaded gun in his car. He was released on $10,000 bail. Bridges stopped using drugs on February 24, 1993, after years of use.

== Memoir ==
Bridges wrote a book, Killing Willis: From Diff'rent Strokes to the Mean Streets to the Life I Always Wanted (2008), discussing his childhood sexual abuse, drug addiction, criminal charges and efforts to establish a public identity independent of the Willis character. He appeared on The Oprah Winfrey Show on April 28, 2010 to discuss the troubled past that he had chronicled in his memoir. In a review on The AV Club, Nathan Rabin described the book as "self-pitying, self-aggrandizing bullshit".

== Filmography ==
=== Film ===
| Year | Title | Role | Notes |
|---|---|---|---|
| 1983 | High School U.S.A. | Otto Lipton | |
| 1989 | She's Out of Control | Water Man | |
| 1992 | The Sounds of Silence | Joe Goodman | Independent film, co-starring Dana Plato |
| 1992 | Homeboy | Johnny Davis | |
| 1996 | Gangstaz | Tyrone | |
| 1997 | The Girl Gets Moe | Dr. Glick | |
| 1998 | The Waterfront | Gary Franklin | |
| 1999 | Flat Out | Dr. Acosta | |
| 2000 | The Thief & the Stripper | Burn | |
| 2002 | The Beach House | Todd | |
| 2002 | The Climb | Eddie | |
| 2002 | Welcome to America | Easy T | |
| 2002 | Scream at the Sound of the Beep | Lamar | |
| 2002 | Pacino is Missing | Harrison Dodge | Ind. film, co-starring Dana Plato |
| 2002 | Baby of the Family | Ted | |
| 2003 | Pauly Shore Is Dead | Himself | Cameo |
| 2003 | Dumb Luck | Lincoln | |
| 2004 | Land of the Free? | Alex | |
| 2004 | Curse of the Maya | Ruben Herardo | |
| 2005 | Treasure N'Tha Hood | Henry Nails | |
| 2005 | Issues | Carson | |
| 2005 | I Got Five on It | Jimmy | Direct-to-video |
| 2006 | San Franpsycho | Officer Eckersley | Direct-to-video |
| 2007 | Frankie D | Frankie D | |
| 2008 | Darkroom | Charles the Barkeep | |
| 2009 | See Dick Run | ATM | |
| 2009 | I Got Five on It Too | Jimmy | |
| 2009 | The Jerk Theory | Waiter | Uncredited |
| 2010 | Big Money Rustlas | Scruffy Scrub #3 | |
| 2010 | The Apparition of Roxanne | Officer Johnston | |
| 2010 | Do Me a Solid | Maurice | Short film |
| 2011 | King of the Underground | Todd | |
| 2012 | That's My Boy | Himself | Cameo |
| 2012 | Turning Point | Marvin | |
| 2014 | Monsters on Main Street | Larry Goleman | |
| 2016 | Dependent's Day | Hank Wright | |
| 2016 | Precious Mettle | Sam | |
| 2016 | The White Sistas | Bishop Wilkins | |
| 2016 | Dead Ringer | Detective Billington | |
| 2016 | Bar Chronicles | The Customer | Ind. film |
| 2016 | Nightblade | Detective Francesco | |
| 2016 | Renaissance Man | Todd | |
| 2016 | Hospital Arrest | Prosecutor Denuyl | |
| 2017 | The White Sistas | Bishop Wilkins | |
| 2019 | A Psycho's Path | Haywood | |

=== Television ===
| Year | Title | Role | Notes |
|---|---|---|---|
| 1975 | Barney Miller | Truman Jackson | Episode: "The Hero" |
| 1975 | The Orphan and the Dude | Leonard Brown | TV movie |
| 1975 | Katherine | Robert | TV movie |
| 1976 | Police Story | Little Walter | Episode: "Oxford Gray" |
| 1977 | Little House on the Prairie | Solomon Henry | Episode: "The Wisdom of Solomon" |
| 1977 | A Circle of Children | Todd | TV movie |
| 1977 | Roots | Bud Harvey | TV Mini-Series |
| 1977 | A Killing Affair | Todd York | TV movie |
| 1977–1978 | Fish | Loomis | Main role (35 episodes) |
| 1977–1978 | The Waltons | Josh Foster | 2 episodes |
| 1978 | The Love Boat | Michael Jr. | Episode: "Mike and Ike" |
| 1978–1986 | Diff'rent Strokes | Willis Jackson | Main role (169 episodes) |
| 1979 | The Return of Mod Squad | Jason Hayes | TV movie |
| 1979 | Hello, Larry | Willis Jackson | 3 episodes |
| 1979–1980 | CHiPs | Todd Bridges | 2 episodes (uncredited) |
| 1979–1981 | The Facts of Life | Willis Jackson | 2 episodes |
| 1980–1981 | Here's Boomer | Turk/Benny | 2 episodes |
| 1983 | High School U.S.A. | Otto Lipton | TV movie |
| 1988 | Twice Dead | Petie | TV movie |
| 1991 | The New Lassie | Deputy Kirby | Episode: "Twin Pekes (Aka Justice)" |
| 1992 | The Ben Stiller Show | Todd Bridges | 2 episodes |
| 1997 | L.A. Heat | Trevor | Episode: "Cop Star" |
| 2000 | The Darkling | Baron | TV movie |
| 2001 | Son of the Beach | Todd Bridges | Episode: "It's a Nude, Nude, Nude, Nude World" |
| 2002 | The Rerun Show | T.J. Davis | 1 episode |
| 2002 | The Young and the Restless | Juice | 8 episodes |
| 2003 | Cram (Celebrity Edition) | Himself | 1 episode |
| 2003 | Ghost Dog: A Detective Tail | Power Plant Guard | TV movie |
| 2004 | Jane Doe: Now You See It, Now You Don't | The Man | TV movie |
| 2005 | Alien Express | Peter | TV movie |
| 2007–2009 | Everybody Hates Chris | Monk | 17 episodes |
| 2008–2012 | World's Dumbest... | Himself | 112 episodes |
| 2011 | Are We There Yet? | Himself | Episode: "The Lindsey Gets High Episode" |
| 2013 | The Ben Show | Himself | Recurring Segment: "Todd Bridges Animated Crack Stories" |
| 2014 | Hotel P | Bryce | Pilot |
| 2016–2020 | Sangre Negra | Dante Lewis | 3 episodes |
| 2021 | Live in Front of a Studio Audience | Himself | Episode: "The Facts of Life/Diff'rent Strokes" |
| 2022 | Celebrity Big Brother | Himself | |
| 2023 | Celebrity Beef | Himself | |
| 2024 | Christmas in the Friendly Skies | Darnell | TV Movie |
| 2024 | Everybody Still Hates Chris | Monk (voice) | 2 episodes |

=== Video games ===
| Year | Title | Voice role |
|---|---|---|
| 2014 | Tesla Effect | Mantus |
| 2016 | 2064: Read Only Memories | Hayden Webber |
| 2019 | Take a Seat | Narrator |
