= Lauri Hendler =

American actress

- Born: 1965 or 1966 (age 60–61); Fort Belvoir, Virginia, U.S.
- Occupation: Actress
- Years active: 1978–present
- Spouse: Steven Reizes (m. 1990)

Lauri Hendler (born 1965 or 1966) is an American actress. She played middle child Julie Kanisky on Gimme a Break! and Little Lulu in the two specials Little Lulu and The Big Hex of Little Lulu.

== Early life ==
Hendler was a model before her first birthday, earning $10 for the job. By age 3 she had become "one of the top talents in show business within her age range". She was raised by her mother, a physical therapist. She grew up with her two siblings and attended Beverly Hills High School and was a National Merit Scholarship Program finalist. After graduating from high school, Hendler attended the University of California, Los Angeles. She began acting professionally while still a student. She studied acting at Tracey Roberts's workshop in Beverly Hills.

== Career ==
Her television guest appearances include CHiPs; Lou Grant; Three's Company; Magnum, P.I.; Mr. Belvedere; Charmed; The West Wing; Becker; Without a Trace; Strong Medicine; ER; and Veep.

During the 1980s, she appeared on game shows including The $25,000 Pyramid, The $100,000 Pyramid, Super Password and Body Language.

She appeared in several ABC weekend specials and in 1980 was in Portrait of an Escort. In 1981, she appeared with Kim Richards as one of two daughters of a blended family in the pilot Why Us?, but this was not picked up as a series. Shortly thereafter, she was cast in Gimme a Break!. In 1983, she appeared in High School U.S.A. with Michael J. Fox. She next had appearances on Mr. Belvedere; Eerie, Indiana; Charmed; The West Wing; Becker; Without a Trace; and ER.

She appeared in the games Saints Row, Saints Row 2, Saints Row: The Third and Saints Row IV as Jane Valderama, a news reporter and radio station DJ.

== Filmography ==
- The Child Stealer (1979, TV Movie) as Andrea
- Portrait of an Escort (1980, TV Movie) as Mandy
- The Promise of Love (1980, TV Movie) as Laurie
- Why Us? (1981, TV Movie) as Zoey Sanborn
- High School U.S.A. (1983, TV Movie) as Nadine
- The Flamingo Kid (1989, TV Movie) as Nikki Willis
- FernGully: The Last Rainforest (1992, voice – Additional Voice)
- The Story Beyond the Still (2011, Short) as Nurse 2
- Inclusion Criteria (2018) as Dr. Greta Brinkman
- Voices (2020) as Joan Morris

== Television ==
- CHiPs (1978) – 1 episode as Robin
- Lou Grant (1978) – 1 episode as 5th Grader
- Three’s Company (1978) – 1 episode as Laurie
- ABC Weekend Specials (1978–1979) – 2 episodes as Little Lulu
- Magnum, P.I. (1980) – 1 episode (“Thank Heaven for Little Girls and Big Ones Too”) as Nancy
- A New Kind of Family (1979–1980) – 11 episodes as Hillary Flanagan
- Gimme a Break! (1981–1986) – 114 episodes as Julie Kanisky Maxwell / Julie Kanisky
- ABC Afterschool Specials (1978–1987) – 3 episodes as Diane Sherman / Carrie Mills / Teague Harrington
- Mr. Belvedere (1987) – 1 episode as Bobbi Bilinski
- Heartbeat (1989) – 1 episode as Cleo Flemming
- Eerie, Indiana (1991, voice) – 1 episode as Fifi
- Harry and the Hendersons (1993) – 4 episodes as Mary
- Wing Commander Academy (1996, voice) – 10 episodes as Maya McEaddens / Lindsay "Payback" Price / Nurse
- Charmed (2000) – 1 episode as Socialite
- The West Wing (2000) – 1 episode as Lawyer
- Becker (2001) – 1 episode as Mrs. Howarth
- Citizen Baines (2001) – 2 episodes as Panero
- Without a Trace (2004) – 1 episode as Mrs. Levine
- Strong Medicine (2004) – 1 episode as Suzanne Simmonds
- ER (2006) – 1 episode as Lenore Bee
- Faux Baby (2008) – 2 episodes as Carrie
- Torchwood (2011) – 1 episode as Angry Nurse
- Southland (2012) – 1 episode as Buzby
- Shameless (2013) – 1 episode as Activist Mother
- The Middle (2015) – 1 episode as Teacher
- Veep (2016) – 1 episode as Heckler
- Get Shorty (2018) – 1 episode as Fran the Editor
- Two Sentence Horror Stories (2017–2019) – 3 episodes as Len ("Guilt Trip")
- Runaways (2019) – 1 episode as Mediator
- American Housewife (2020) – 1 episode as Roberta
- Young Sheldon (2021) – 1 episode as Janet
- The Goldbergs (2021) – 1 episode as Francine Ham
- Animal Kingdom (2021) – 1 episode as Diane
- Diary of a Future President (2021) – 1 episode as Disgruntled Parent 2
- I Think You Should Leave with Tim Robinson (2023) – 1 episode, role: unknown

== Video Games (voice roles) ==
- Saints Row (2006) – Radio Voice (as Laurie Hendler)
- Saints Row 2 (2008) – Jane Valderama
- The Elder Scrolls V: Skyrim (2011) – Alea Quintus / Colette Marence / Elda Early-Dawn / others
- Saints Row: The Third (2011) – Jane Valderama
- Saints Row IV (2013) – Jane Valderama (as Laurie Hendler)

== Music Videos ==
- Kidds for Kids in Africa: Love’s Gonna Find a Way (1985) – Herself
