= Steven Mond =

Canadian former child actor (born 1971)

- Born: May 12, 1971 (age 55); Canada
- Occupation: Actor
- Years active: 1978–1985

Steven Mond (born May 12, 1971) is a Canadian former child actor best known for playing Robbie Jason on the sitcom Diff'rent Strokes.

Mond also guest starred on the TV series CHiPs and Quincy M.E. and had a role in the Steven Spielberg film, 1941 (1979).

He is currently a math teacher at Real Salt Lake City in Herriman, Utah. In May 2018, he competed on the Jeopardy! Teachers Tournament, where he made it to the finals and finished in third place, winning $25,000.

== Filmography ==
Year	Title	Role	Notes
1978	Goodbye, Franklin High	Little Boy	
1978	A Guide to a Married Woman	Arnold	Television movie
1979	Quincy M.E.	Boy	2 episodes
1978-1979	CHiPs	Boy/Wheelchair Patient	2 episodes
1979	1941	Gus Douglas	
1980	Getting There	Joey	Television movie
1981	Murder in Texas	Robert "Boot" Hill	Television movie
1981	Time Warp	Ron Devore	
1980-1985	Diff'rent Strokes	Robbie Jason	Recurring role
