= Diff'rent Strokes =

American television sitcom (1978–1986)

- Genre: Sitcom
- Created by: Jeff Harris; Bernie Kukoff
- Directed by: Gerren Keith (seasons 2–8); Various (seasons 1 and 5–8)
- Starring: Conrad Bain; Gary Coleman; Todd Bridges; Dana Plato; Charlotte Rae; Mary Jo Catlett; Danny Cooksey; Dixie Carter; Mary Ann Mobley
- Theme music composer: Alan Thicke; Al Burton; Gloria Loring
- Opening theme: "It Takes Diff'rent Strokes" performed by Alan Thicke, Linda Harmon, Gloria Loring and Gene Morford
- Ending theme: "It Takes Diff'rent Strokes" (seasons 1–7; 1978–1985); (instrumental in season 8; 1985–1986)
- Country of origin: United States
- Original language: English
- No. of seasons: 8
- No. of episodes: 189 (list of episodes)

Production
- Executive producers: Budd Grossman (season 1); Howard Leeds (seasons 2–6); Blake Hunter (seasons 5–7); Martin Cohan (season 7); Bob Brunner; Ken Hecht (season 8)
- Producers: Howard Leeds; Herbert Kenwith (season 1); Martin Cohan (seasons 1–6); Ben Starr (seasons 2–4); Bruce Taylor (season 7); Al Aidekman; Richard Gurman (season 8)
- Production locations: Metromedia Square; Hollywood, California (1978–82); Universal City Studios; Universal City, California (1982–85); Sunset-Gower Studios ABC Stage 77; Hollywood, California (1985–86)
- Camera setup: Multi-camera
- Running time: 24 minutes
- Production companies: Tandem Productions (1978–1986); Embassy Television (1985–1986) (season 8)

Original release
- Network: NBC
- Release: November 3, 1978 – May 4, 1985
- Network: ABC
- Release: September 27, 1985 – March 7, 1986

Related
- The Facts of Life; Hello, Larry

Diff'rent Strokes is an American television sitcom, which originally aired on NBC from November 3, 1978, to May 4, 1985, and on ABC from September 27, 1985, to March 7, 1986. The series stars Gary Coleman and Todd Bridges as Arnold and Willis Jackson, respectively, who are two boys from Harlem taken in by the Drummonds, a wealthy Park Avenue businessman and his daughter. Phillip Drummond, played by Conrad Bain, is a widower for whom their deceased mother previously worked; his daughter, Kimberly, is played by Dana Plato. During the first season and the first half of the second season, Charlotte Rae also starred as Mrs. Edna Garrett, the Drummonds' first housekeeper, who ultimately spun off into her own sitcom, The Facts of Life, as a housemother at the fictional Eastland School. The second housekeeper, Adelaide Brubaker, was played by Nedra Volz. The third housekeeper, Pearl Gallagher, was played by Mary Jo Catlett, first appearing as a recurring character, later becoming a main cast member.

The series made stars of Coleman, Bridges, and Plato and became known for the very special episodes, in which serious issues such as racism, illegal drug use, alcoholism, hitchhiking, kidnapping, and child sexual abuse were dramatically explored.

== History ==
Diff'rent Strokes was initially devised to serve as a vehicle for both Conrad Bain and Gary Coleman. Bain had recently finished a six-year run co-starring as Dr. Arthur Harmon on the hugely successful Maude. When that series ended production following star Beatrice Arthur's decision to leave the show in the spring of 1978, Tandem Productions producer Norman Lear was keen to find a suitable sitcom for Bain to star in. Ten-year-old Coleman, meanwhile, had caught producers' attention after appearing in a number of commercials and television guest roles, and the previous year had starred in three pilot episodes by Lear that attempted to revive the Little Rascals film series of the 1920-40s. The pilots did not sell although they were later edited into a television film for some markets. Lear saw immense potential in Coleman and was determined to find him a suitable sitcom, and it was decided that Bain and Coleman would make a good, if unusual, pairing for the project.

With Bain himself having considerable input into the options available and directions they took, producers considered a number of settings and formats, including one in which Bain was a gumshoe, with Coleman as his young associate-cum-informant. The fictional detective Bulldog Drummond served as inspiration for what would have been Bain's character, and although this concept was ultimately dropped, the surname "Drummond" was retained to become the surname of Bain's character in Diff'rent Strokes.

Several such concepts were considered before a rough outline for the eventual series—in which Bain plays a wealthy businessman left to take care of his late housekeeper's son, the orphaned Coleman—was settled upon and given the working title 45 Minutes from Harlem (even though Harlem is only ten to fifteen minutes away from the Upper East Side by subway or taxi). An alternate version of the basic scenario had a slightly harder-nosed Bain as a wealthy estate developer who finds that he can only purchase a potentially lucrative Harlem housing block for redevelopment if he also takes custody of the orphan, Coleman, who lives there; this version was nixed in favor of the former.

NBC showed immediate interest and felt the format had potential; at their request the pitch was developed, with Coleman's character, Arnold, gaining an older brother, producers feeling Coleman would benefit from the addition of a second, slightly older child to interact with, and who could add a further dynamic to storylines. Producers immediately decided child actor Todd Bridges should play the older brother; he had appeared in a number of commercials and guest roles. The producers were also impressed by Bridges’ stint on the sitcom Fish, which had also been cancelled earlier in 1978. Bridges was offered the role without needing an audition. The pitch meeting to NBC took place on May 9, 1978, with NBC immediately ordering an optional 26 episodes.

A daughter to Bain's character and a housekeeper were added to the lineup. Producer Al Burton had spotted Dana Plato as part of a cheerleading team auditioning on The Gong Show and felt she had a spark about her, and recommended her for the role of Drummond's daughter Kimberly. Producers were keen to cast Charlotte Rae as housekeeper Edna Garrett, feeling that her more "traditional sitcom" talents would work well for the unusual line-up and that as an older character she would have good chemistry with Bain. As with Bridges, Rae was offered the role without audition, but was locked into a contract with CBS; however, Lear was determined to have Rae for the role and used his influence to convince CBS to release her from her contract, freeing her up to be available for the role. The title for the series eventually became Diff'rent Strokes, inspired by the phrase "Different strokes for different folks", popularized by boxer Muhammad Ali in 1966 (Ali himself makes a guest appearance in the second season).

The sitcom stars Coleman as Arnold Jackson and Bridges as his older brother, Willis, two children from a poor section of Harlem whose deceased mother previously worked for rich widower Philip Drummond (Bain), and on her deathbed asked him to take care of her sons, their father already being deceased. They live in a penthouse with Drummond, his daughter Kimberly (Plato), and their housemaid. At the outset of the series, the role of housemaid is filled by Rae as Mrs. Garrett; when Rae departed for spin-off series The Facts of Life during the second season, she was replaced by Adelaide Brubaker (Volz), who in turn, was replaced by Pearl Gallagher (Catlett) from the fifth season until the end of the run. They lived in the penthouse suite at 697 Park Avenue in New York City. As Arnold, Coleman popularized the catchphrase "What'choo talkin' 'bout, Willis?" with the ending varying depending on whom he was addressing. Early episodes mostly address typical family sitcom issues, but as the series progresses, it sometimes focuses on more serious topics, including drug abuse, alcoholism, hitchhiking, child abuse and crime.

=== Seasons 1–2 (1978–80) ===
The first season aired at 8:00 pm ET on Friday nights. It dealt with common topics such as various growing-up and adjustment issues experienced by Arnold and Willis, and mild culture clashes. Plots that saw Mr. Drummond searching for love, and stories that mildly addressed racism were also sometimes featured.

Although billed on the opening credits of each episode, Plato appeared only semi-regularly for much of the first season. On-screen this was explained with her character often said to be away at her private school; in reality the producers were still undecided whether the character was extraneous to the format, with the option that she could simply be faded into the background and written out as away studying should they choose to drop her. But Plato and her character were well received by audiences, and the producers became convinced that her inclusion added an extra element of appeal to the audience, offering a female character for young girls and women to identify with. As a result, from the later first season and on into the second season, Plato became a regular character.

Charlotte Rae appeared as Edna Garrett in every first-season episode; the final broadcast episode of the first season, "The Girls' School", also known as "Garrett's Girls", sees her agreeing to accompany Kimberly to her private school, the fictional Eastland, in order to help with preparations for a play- in actuality, this episode acted as the backdoor pilot for the spin-off series The Facts of Life (Garrett's Girls being an early working title). Mrs. Garrett is present for the first 13 episodes of the second season of Diff'rent Strokes, with the character last seen in the episode "The Rivals", after which she leaves, offscreen, to take a permanent position at Eastland, The Facts of Life having by then been picked up for a full series. (Kimberly did not become a regular character in that series, although the two shows had a number of crossovers.)

Shortly after the second season began, the show was moved to Wednesdays in a less kid-friendly timeslot, 9:00 pm ET. Following Rae's departure midway through the second season, Nedra Volz took over as the housekeeper, the older and crankier Adelaide Brubaker, introduced in the episode "The Election". Volz appeared on a semi-regular basis, but was not added to the opening credits, instead always listed with the guest cast on the closing credits. This situation arose in part because Rae's contract contained a clause that would allow her to return to Diff'rent Strokes if The Facts of Life were canceled.

Also first appearing in the second season was Arnold's best friend Dudley Johnson (Shavar Ross), first seen in the episode "Teacher's Pet". Robbie Jason (Steven Mond), another recurring school friend, also makes his first appearance in that episode. Arnold and Dudley (and often Robbie) shared many childhood escapades together, and were featured in many episodes, school-based and otherwise, throughout the show's run. As part of this, Arnold's school life also gradually began to feature more in many episodes; this increased in subsequent seasons.

The first and second season also included three hour-long crossover episodes (edited into two-part format for syndication and overseas broadcasts) with NBC sitcom Hello, Larry, which had been moved to the slot immediately following Diff'rent Strokes in an effort to boost its ratings (an effort that ultimately failed; it was canceled after the end of its second season).

=== Seasons 3–4 (1980–82) ===
The third and fourth seasons had some of the show's highest ratings and continued much of the themes of the first two seasons, but also gradually saw the introduction of some more serious topics into storylines. Beginning with the third-season episode "Count Your Blessings" and also touched upon in several other episodes is the fact that Arnold will never grow much taller, reflecting Gary Coleman's real-life medical condition. This same episode introduces wheelchair-aided Melanie Watson (1968–2025), born with osteogenesis imperfecta, as Kathy Gordon, who continued to guest-star one episode per season until Season 6. Also, shortly after Season 4 started, the show kept the same 9:00 pm ET timeslot, but moved from Wednesday to Thursday.

Also introduced in the third season is Philip's dotty and eccentric sister Sophia (Dody Goodman), in the episode "Junk Food Junkie". Appearing on a semi-regular basis, she effectively filled the same function as Adelaide as the older female character in many stories, and is present in many third and fourth season episodes.

Other recurring characters introduced over the third season included Le Tari as Dudley's adoptive father, Ted Ramsey (in the episode "Football Father"), Janet Jackson as Willis's girlfriend Charlene DuPrey and, in the fourth season episode "Kathy", Arnold's teacher Miss Chung, played by Rosalind Chao, who had played a different character in the third-season episode "Almost American", in which the regular cast only have minor roles, which served as the backdoor pilot for a potential sitcom focusing on the students of an immigration and naturalization class. The pilot was not picked up for a series, and was the only time the characters and setting appeared in Diff'rent Strokes.

Due to a pay dispute involving Coleman and his parents—who acted as his managers—over the latter's demand to increase his salary from $1,800 to $30,000 per episode, which resulted in Tandem suing them for breach of contract, Coleman did not appear in the first four filmed episodes of the fourth season ("The Ski Weekend", "First Day Blues", "The Team" and "Hello Daddy?"), with a separately filmed cameo tagged on to the end of one episode explaining that he was away in the country visiting some of Mr. Drummond's relatives. The final two episodes produced for the third season ("Growing Up" and "The Model") had originally been postponed due to a writer's strike, and the interspersing of these two episodes with the ones without Coleman taped at the start of the fourth season allowed the span of his absence to be broken down onscreen. When the dispute was ultimately settled, Coleman returned to the series, missing only two more episodes (season 7's "The Gymnasts" and "Baseball Blues").

Due to the popularity of Coleman's character, a spin-off series was briefly considered, to be titled Arnold and focusing on the character's school life. But the idea was dropped, both due to producers not wanting to water down the character's appeal in the main series, and deciding that the additional workload would be too much for Coleman..

=== Seasons 5–6 (1982–84) ===
The fifth season saw a day and timeslot move, to Saturdays at 8:00 pm ET (with the new comedy Silver Spoons following at 8:30). The second episode of the fifth season, "In The Swim", introduced Mary Jo Catlett as the rotund, ever-cheerful Pearl Gallagher, the last of the Drummond household's three maids. Catlett joined the main cast, appeared in almost every episode until the end of the show's run, and was billed on the opening credits from the sixth season onward. "In The Swim" also saw the move of Kimberly from her private school, to the one attended by Willis—a move brought about in part at Plato's suggestion, with it being felt it might open up potential new storylines.

The fifth season also introduced a new recurring character in Arnold's class at school, that of Lisa Hayes (Nikki Swasey). Although in her first appearance, in the episode "Cyrano De Jackson", she is sweet on Arnold, in subsequent appearances, the pair were enemies, often squabbling and trading insults, a recurring theme until the end of the series (although Lisa's final appearance, in the penultimate episode of the show's run, "The Photo Club", sees the pair addressing their differences and striking a truce of sorts).

The fifth season also continued the upturn of many more storylines dealing with serious topics, becoming the epitome of the "Very Special Episode" concept employed by 1980s sitcoms, a trend that continued until the end of the show's run; the best-known example being the fifth season two-parter "The Bicycle Man" (originally broadcast on February 5 and 12, 1983), in which Arnold and Dudley are lured in by pedophilic bicycle shop owner Mr. Horton (Gordon Jump) who attempts to molest the boys.

Midway through the sixth season, Plato became pregnant with her first child, and approached the producers of the show to incorporate her pregnancy into Kimberly's plotline. Initially they agreed to add to Plato's suggestion, but later reversed course. (Incidentally, a Season 3 episode, "Little Mother", had tackled a similar theme, involving a friend of Kimberly who discovers she is pregnant and, because of a misunderstanding, the rest of the family is led to think that Kimberly is pregnant before finding out the truth.) Plato's publicized brushes with substance abuse contributed to this decision, resulting in her dismissal from the series at the end of the sixth season.

Although still pulling in reasonable viewing figures by this time, ratings were beginning to fall, so producers decided to add several new characters to the cast to freshen the series up and open up future storylines. Dixie Carter and Danny Cooksey were cast to portray recently divorced television aerobics instructor Margaret "Maggie" McKinney and her son Sam, respectively. Carter was introduced midway into the sixth season (in the episode "Drummond's Lady"); after she abruptly left for California, Drummond and the family took off after her, in the two-part story "Hooray for Hollywood", a storyline that also introduced Sam, Maggie's son from her previous marriage. Phillip proposed to Maggie, and they married in the episode "The Wedding" (first broadcast on February 25, 1984). Several past characters attended the wedding ceremony, including Aunt Sophia, Adelaide, and Mrs. Garrett.

=== Season 7 (1984–85) ===
For the seventh season, Carter and Cooksey were added to the opening credits (with Carter getting special "and" billing, last in the order) and many new areas and ideas were explored, as viewers now got to see Philip as a happily married man.

Due to Plato's pregnancy and publicized substance abuse issues, she had been dropped from the regular cast at the end of the previous season. Kimberly was written out of the show with the explanation that she moved to Paris to study for a couple of years, but returned as a guest star for the season finale "A Special Friend", after Plato gave birth.

Since there was a new fresh-faced kid in the house with Sam, Arnold now had his own little sidekick and was happy to be a "big brother" for a change. With Willis shifted into the background slightly, this new brotherly duo took center stage for many storylines. In the season, Bridges continued as a main cast member, but was absent in several episodes. Additionally, stories focusing on Arnold's school life, which had featured occasionally in many previous seasons, were delved into much more.

=== Season 8 (1985–86) ===
The introduction of Maggie and Sam had not improved ratings, which continued to decline over the course of the 1984–85 season; as a result, in the spring of 1985, NBC decided to cancel Diff'rent Strokes after seven seasons. However, Embassy Television subsequently reached a deal with ABC to pick up the series for an eighth season; the network change saw Diff'rent Strokes move back to its original night, Friday, airing at 9:00 pm ET. With this move, the show's recognizable theme song was re-recorded, updating it into a then-more modern pop style. (Fellow Embassy sitcoms and former NBC stablemates The Facts of Life and Silver Spoons—respectively entering their seventh and fourth seasons—also debuted similarly updated versions of their theme songs for the 1985–86 season.) Arnold's "What'choo talkin' 'bout?" catchphrase—which was gradually directed less towards Willis and more to other characters over the course of the series; the oft-quoted Willis variant not being used at all during Season 7—was retired, reportedly as Coleman had grown tired of using the line.

Dixie Carter opted not to return to the series. It was said that she had left to star in her own series, Designing Women, however she and Coleman had often clashed, leading to tension and animosity on-set. She was replaced in the role by Mary Ann Mobley, who had previously played an unrelated, one-off love interest of Drummond's in the second-season episode "Teacher's Pet". She had been considered for Maggie when the role was created, but was not chosen in part due to the age disparity between her and Bain (the two actors were born 15 years apart, with Bain being the elder).

In this final season, Jason Hervey joined the semi-regular cast as Charlie, another of Arnold's school friends. First seen in the episode "Bully For Arnold", a number of storylines focus on Arnold, Dudley, Robbie and Charlie as a quartet. Plots focusing on Arnold and Sam also continued to feature prominently, with Willis by this stage appearing on a secondary, semi-regular basis.

After her guest appearance at the end of the previous season, Plato made several guest appearances in the final season, being billed alongside the guest cast as a "special guest star". (Despite not being a regular, Plato also appeared at the end of that season's opening credit sequence with the rest of the main cast.) Her final appearance, in the episode "Bulimia" (originally aired on January 17, 1986), dealt with the revelation of Kimberly's eating disorder, and won praise both for Plato's performance and the sensitivity of the writing.

ABC canceled the series after 19 episodes of the proposed 22-episode season were produced, a result of low ratings and a feeling that the series had run its course; although it was also observed that by this time, the once joyous Coleman, now 17, was looking angry and haggard, a combination of his ongoing medical issues and a bitter financial dispute with his parents.

The final episode, "The Front Page" (originally aired on March 7, 1986), involves Arnold writing an investigative report for his school newspaper on student athletes using anabolic steroids. It was in many respects a standard episode, with no indication that it would be the series finale due to the show's abrupt cancellation. Bridges, Plato and Catlett were all absent from the episode, and several cast members later voiced their disappointment that they had not realized it would be the final episode, and would have liked to have been present to mark the end of the series onscreen more adequately.

Following its cancellation, the show was brought back onto ABC's schedule in June 1986 for three months of Summer reruns, airing on Saturdays at 8:00 pm ET until August 30 of that year (airing opposite The Facts of Life which was on NBC). The final season ranked 69th out of 106 shows, and averaged an 11.5 household rating.

== Cast ==
=== Main ===
- Conrad Bain as Phillip Drummond
- Gary Coleman as Arnold Jackson
- Todd Bridges as Willis Jackson
- Dana Plato as Kimberly Drummond (1978–84, 1985–86 recurring)
- Charlotte Rae as Edna Garrett (1978–79, 1984 guest)
- Mary Jo Catlett as Pearl Gallagher (1982–86)
- Danny Cooksey as Sam McKinney (1984–86)
- Dixie Carter as Maggie McKinney Drummond, (1984–85)
- Mary Ann Mobley as Maggie McKinney Drummond (1985–86)

=== Recurring ===
- Nedra Volz as Adelaide Brubaker (1980–82, 1984 guest)
- Janet Jackson as Charlene DuPrey (1980–84)
- Dody Goodman as Sophia Drummond (1981–84)
- Shavar Ross as Dudley Johnson (1980–86)
- Le Tari as Ted Ramsey (1980–84)
- Rosalind Chao as Miss Chung (1981–83)
- Steven Mond as Robbie Jason (1980–85)
- Jason Hervey as Charlie (1985–86)
- Melanie Watson Bernhardt as Kathy Gordon (1981–84)
- Nikki Swasey as Lisa Hayes (1982–86)

== Episodes ==
Season	Episodes	Originally released			Rank	Rating
Season	Episodes	First released	Last released	Network	Rank	Rating
1	24	November 3, 1978	May 4, 1979	NBC	27	19.9
2	26	September 21, 1979	March 26, 1980	NBC	26	20.3
3	22	November 12, 1980	May 13, 1981	NBC	17	20.7 (Note: Tied with Fantasy Island and Trapper John, M.D.)
4	26	October 29, 1981	May 20, 1982	NBC	36	—N/a
5	24	October 2, 1982	May 14, 1983	NBC	51	—N/a
6	24	October 1, 1983	May 12, 1984	NBC	50	15.1 (Note: Tied with Matt Houston and Oh Madeline)
7	24	September 29, 1984	May 4, 1985	NBC	37	14.7
8	19	September 27, 1985	March 7, 1986	ABC	69	11.5

=== Very special episodes ===
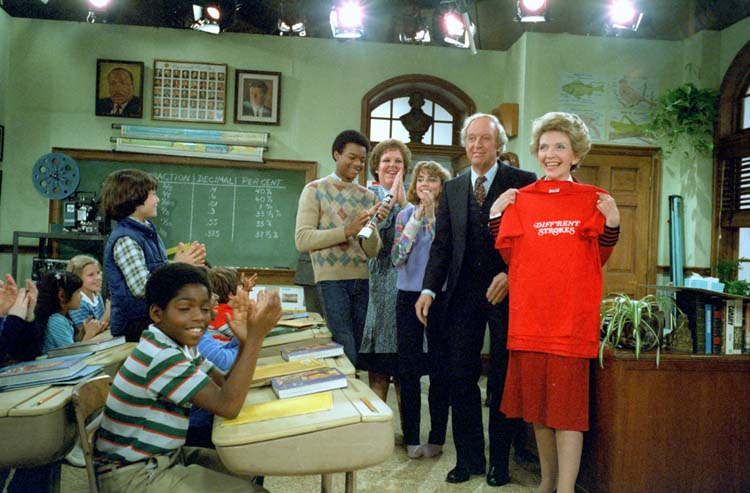
Nancy Reagan on the set of Diff'rent Strokes in 1983

Diff'rent Strokes was also known for its many "very special episodes," most notably an anti-drug episode ("The Reporter") that featured First Lady Nancy Reagan, who promoted her "Just Say No" campaign, and "The Bicycle Man", a two-part episode that guest starred Gordon Jump as a pedophile who lures Arnold and Dudley into his bicycle shop and attempts to molest them.

In a two-part episode on the dangers of hitchhiking ("The Hitchhikers"), Kimberly and Arnold (who were out in the cold weather and didn't have money for cab or bus fare) were abducted by a serial kidnapper-rapist (played by Woody Eney), who initially acted as a good Samaritan by giving the two of them a ride and inviting them to his apartment. After the man's true nature became known, Arnold escaped to look for help and the man nearly raped Kimberly before the police arrived to arrest him. At the end of the episode, Bain (in an out-of-character PSA) spoke about what to do if real life situations as the one portrayed on the show were to occur.

Two notable episodes dealt with the consequences of alcoholism. In the first, season 5's "A Growing Problem," Willis moves out of the penthouse to live with Jerry (Lawrence Monoson) who abuses alcohol. In the second, season 7's "Cheers to Arnold," Arnold must deal with Ricky (Robert Jayne), a classmate whom he catches drinking a thermos of alcohol in the school bathroom.

In the final season (when the sitcom moved from NBC to ABC), the one-hour season opener ("Sam's Missing") revolved around Sam being kidnapped by Donald Brown (Royce D. Applegate), a bereaved father hoping to replace his own dead son, Tommy.

Other notable episodes included season 8's "Bulimia," in which the family discovered that Kimberly was suffering from bulimia. In season 7's "A Special Friend," Arnold and Sam met Karen, a street performer. After a performance, she has an epileptic seizure and Sam thinks she's dying. The boys then feel uncomfortable around her and when they begin making jokes about her seizures, they find out that housekeeper Pearl herself has epilepsy but, unlike Karen, controls her seizures with medication.

=== Spin-off and crossovers ===
The Facts of Life (1979–1988) is a spin-off of Diff'rent Strokes featuring Drummond's former housekeeper, Mrs. Garrett, who had accepted a job as the housemother for a dormitory at Eastland, an all-girls private school that Kimberly was attending. In a late first-season episode of Strokes ("The Girls School", which served as the backdoor pilot of Facts), Mrs. Garrett took Kimberly to the school with the intent of helping her sew costumes for a school play. While there, Mrs. Garrett met Kimberly's classmates and was offered the job as "dorm mother." She declined, but come fall, she had a change of heart. The Diff'rent Strokes cast appeared in the first episode of The Facts of Life (at one point, Drummond asks Mrs. Garrett "Are you sure we can't change your mind to come back to us?"). The success of the spin-off led to several Strokes/Facts crossovers in the ensuing years.

While not a spin-off, Hello, Larry (1979–1980) had a connection to Strokes as it was established in a crossover episode that Philip Drummond and Larry Alder (McLean Stevenson) were old Army buddies. Mr. Drummond had bought the company that owned the radio station where Larry worked as a talk show host.

The episode "Almost American" (aka "Night School"), was the pilot for a potential spin-off series, which ultimately was not picked up for a full series.

In addition, while not official in-universe cross-overs, two sixth season stories saw characters meeting stars of two of NBC's other biggest shows: the episode Mr. T and Mr. T sees Mr. T guest starring when the apartment block is used to film a (fictional) episode of The A-Team; and in the two-part "Hooray for Hollywood," Arnold and Dudley sneak onto the set of a (fictional) episode of Knight Rider in hope of meeting series star, David Hasselhoff. (Although Hasselhoff, in his costume as Michael Knight appears, the voice of K.I.T.T. is not provided by William Daniels, who voices K.I.T.T. in the television series, but by an uncredited voice actor who voiced the car for various Universal Studios promotions.)

Additionally, Arnold appeared on the Silver Spoons episode "The Great Computer Caper" and the Amazing Stories episode "Remote Control Man".

=== Later appearances as the characters ===
In 1994, Coleman appeared in an episode of Married... with Children ("How Green Was My Apple"), playing a building code inspector whom Al Bundy (Ed O'Neill) called to report an illegal driveway. When Kelly (Christina Applegate) recognizes him, he denies any connection to Arnold Jackson, but utters his catchphrase to Al, "What'cha talkin' about, Bundy?"

In 1996, Coleman and Bain reprised their roles for the series finale of The Fresh Prince of Bel-Air entitled "I, Done Part II", where they consider buying the Banks mansion. They reference Willis by name before meeting Will Smith's character, leading to Coleman uttering a variation of his catchphrase, "What'cha talkin' about, Will?"

=== Additional catchphrase references and appearances in popular culture ===
In 2004, Coleman appeared on the second season of The Surreal Life and was pressured to quote his famous catchphrase by Vanilla Ice. He also guest-starred as himself on The Wayans Bros., The Ben Stiller Show, Drake & Josh, The Jamie Foxx Show, The Parkers, Robot Chicken, The Simpsons, and 227.

== After Diff'rent Strokes ended ==
Following the cancellation of Diff'rent Strokes in 1986 after eight seasons due to low ratings, Coleman, Bridges, and Plato faced immense struggles in landing other acting jobs. All three experienced various legal problems while Bridges and Plato also struggled with drug addictions, all of which were documented in the press. The press and fans of the series blamed the cast's personal problems and faltering careers on what was eventually dubbed the "curse of Diff'rent Strokes" by various tabloids.

=== Gary Coleman ===
In 1989 three years after the series was canceled, Coleman sued his adoptive parents and his former manager over misappropriation of his trust fund which held his career earnings of roughly $18 million but only had $220,000 left when he opened the fund at 18 years old. Although he was eventually awarded over $1 million in the decision after the long legal dispute, Coleman who had suffered from many illnesses that came with costly medical bills and lacking adequate health insurance filed for bankruptcy in 1999. In 1998, Coleman was arrested and charged with assault after he punched a woman harassing him and demanding an autograph while he was shopping for a bullet proof vest in a California shopping mall. Coleman later pleaded no contest and received a suspended sentence, a $400 fine, was ordered to pay his victim's medical bill and take anger management classes. Coleman's acting roles after Diff’rent Strokes were mostly cameos in TV shows such as the series finale of the Fresh Prince of Bel Air in which Coleman reprised his role as Arnold Jackson for the final time or appearing in low budget direct to video movies with his final film appearance being in the 2009 mockumentary Midgets vs. Mascots. In 2001, Coleman (still working as a security guard) was videotaped trying to stop a vehicle from entering the mall. The driver ridiculed him and released the tape to be broadcast on numerous television shows. In 2007, Coleman was cited for disorderly conduct in Provo, Utah, for having a "heated discussion" with a woman. On May 26, 2010, Coleman, who had battled health problems since childhood caused by congenital kidney disease which stunted his growth to only 4 foot 8 inches tall, was admitted to Utah Valley Regional Medical Center in Provo after falling and hitting his head after suffering a seizure. Coleman was then placed on life support after suffering an intracranial hemorrhage and died on May 28 from complications of his injury at age 42.

=== Dana Plato ===
In 1984, during the series' sixth season, Plato became pregnant and her character was written out of the series (though she would go on to make guest appearances for the final two seasons). Before giving birth, she married the child's father, musician Lanny Lambert, but the couple divorced in 1990. Due to financial difficulties and her severe addiction to drugs and alcohol, Plato voluntarily relinquished custody of her son, Tyler, to Lambert. In an attempt to boost her faltering career, Plato got breast implants and posed for Playboy in June 1989, but her appearance in the magazine backfired and did not help her land acting jobs. Plato mostly starred in B-movies such as Bikini Beach Race (1992) and Lethal Cowboy (1995) and pornographic films such as The Story of Jack and Jill...and Jill (1998). By 1990, Plato was living in Las Vegas. Despite having earned $25,000 an episode while on the series, she was often broke likely from her years of drug abuse and was working as a cashier at a dry cleaning store to make ends meet. In February 1991, she was arrested after robbing a Las Vegas video store armed with a pellet gun stealing $164 but instead of prison, Plato was given five years of probation. She was arrested the following year for forging prescriptions for Valium and served thirty days in jail and was ordered by the court to attend drug rehabilitation. In 1998, she appeared in a softcore pornographic film entitled Different Strokes: The Story of Jack and Jill...and Jill, which was intended to capitalize on her Diff'rent Strokes fame. After her arrests, Plato publicly admitted that she struggled with an addiction to drugs and alcohol since she was fourteen years old. Plato died of a drug overdose on May 8, 1999, in Moore, Oklahoma at age 34, just one day after her appearance on The Howard Stern Show. Her death was ruled a suicide. Her son, Tyler, tragically died by suicide at the age of 25 years old in 2010.

=== Todd Bridges ===
After the series ended Bridges developed an addiction to cocaine. In February 1988, he was arrested and charged with the attempted murder of a drug dealer at a crack house in South Central Los Angeles. He was acquitted in November 1989. Bridges was also arrested on a concealed weapon charge and possession of cocaine. In 1994, he was arrested after allegedly ramming someone's car after an argument. After years of battling drug addiction, Bridges finally became sober in the late 1990s after completing a comprehensive rehabilitation program. Until then, he traveled across the United States, touring schools and discussing the dangers of drug use. Bridges has continued acting in films and television. Bridges's more high-profile role was as Monk, a shell-shocked Vietnam veteran, conspiracy theorist, and nephew of Chris's boss Doc on the sitcom Everybody Hates Chris. Since Charlotte Rae's death in 2018 at the age of 92, as of 2026, Bridges remains the only living member of the original cast.

== Docudramas ==
Two unofficial docudramas were produced about the show:

- In 2000, Fox broadcast a one-hour television movie, After Diff'rent Strokes: When the Laughter Stopped. This film which starred unknown actors, focused on Plato's life after the show, leading to her suicide. Bridges guest starred in this film as a drug dealer who sold drugs to a younger version of himself.
- On September 4, 2006, NBC aired a television drama titled Behind the Camera: The Unauthorized Story of Diff'rent Strokes. This film, which chronicles the rise and decline of the sitcom's child stars, also features recent interview clips with Coleman and Bridges. The two briefly appear in the movie's final scene, standing by Plato's grave.

== Home media ==
Sony Pictures Home Entertainment (formerly Columbia TriStar Home Entertainment) has released Seasons 1 and 2 of Diff'rent Strokes on DVD in Region 1 and 4. Season 1 was also released in Regions 2 and 5 on October 6, 2008. On September 29, 2009, a "Fan Favorites" DVD was released. This is a one disc compilation consisting of eight episodes from Season 2.

On April 6, 2012, it was announced that Shout! Factory had acquired the rights to the series; they subsequently released the third season on DVD on July 17, 2012. Season 4 was released on November 20, 2012. Season 5 was released on April 4, 2017. Season 6 was released on July 25, 2017. Season 7 was released on February 27, 2018. Season 8 was released on May 29, 2018.

On August 27, 2013, it was announced that Mill Creek Entertainment had acquired the rights to various television series from the Sony Pictures library, including Diff'rent Strokes. They subsequently re-released the first and second seasons on DVD on July 15, 2014.

The series had graded its audio tracks to AAC 2 Channels.

DVD name	No. of episodes	Release dates	
DVD name	No. of episodes	Region 1	Region 4
The Complete First Season	24	September 14, 2004; July 15, 2014 (re-release)	November 22, 2006
The Complete Second Season	26	January 31, 2006; July 15, 2014 (re-release)	November 4, 2008
The Complete Third Season	22	July 17, 2012	N/A
The Complete Fourth Season	26	November 20, 2012	N/A
The Complete Fifth Season	24	April 4, 2017	N/A
The Complete Sixth Season	23	July 25, 2017	N/A
The Complete Seventh Season	24	February 27, 2018	N/A
The Complete Eighth Season	19	May 29, 2018	N/A

== See also ==
- The Facts of Life (1979)
- Adoption in the United States
- Interracial adoption
- White savior § Appearance in television
- Silver Spoons (1982)
- Webster (1983)
- The Fresh Prince of Bel-Air (1990)
