= Social problem film =

Narrative movie about a social issue

A social problem film is a narrative film that integrates a larger social conflict into the individual conflict between its characters. In the context of the United States and of Hollywood, the genre is defined by fictionalized depictions of social crises set in realistic American domestic or institutionalized settings.

== Background ==
Like many film genres, the exact definition is often in the eye of the beholder; however, Hollywood did produce and market a number of topical films in the 1930s, and by the 1940s, the term "social problem" film, or "message" film, was conventional in its usage among the film industry and the public.

Many characteristics that have grown to define the social problem film revolve around the perceived consciousness of the nation about a certain social issue and integrating that issue into a narrative structure. Social problems such as the horrors of war, suffering of the poor, addiction, the rights of women, and the inhumanity of a certain world are often put on display. The problem with defining this type of film as a genre lies within the ability it has to separate itself from films that display similar style, as a lot of films do address social issues. However, the social problem film differentiates itself by focusing on the problems within the historical context of the current time, dealing with the social issue of a certain era as it applies to that era with a style that is much more didactic than its contemporaries. Furthermore, the social problem film allows further immersion into a certain issue than other genre films. For instance, gangster and prison films will reflect certain features of a social issue but won't actually fully explore the problem in the way that would qualify it for this genre.

== Defining characteristics ==
=== Historical context and didactic nature ===
An important fact of the social problem film is its ability to react and display a social problem that is relevant to the current era it was produced in. It specifically addresses an issue while the issue is still part of the national consciousness, often forming an argument for what the problem actually is through the narrative and character development. Early social problem films often blended ideological feelings of the time into a narrative which translated it into a message for audiences to absorb. This can be evidenced within certain sociological experiments that occurred revolving around the ability for a film to change public perception. A prime example of this is the representation of anti-semitism within the film Gentleman's Agreement (1947) and the subsequent sociological study by Russell Middleton that measured perceived anti-semitism before and after seeing the film. Surprisingly the film seemed to positively affect the subjects as the majority of people who participated in the study had markedly less anti-semitic feelings than before they saw the film. Although there are certain factors that need to be considered this study seems to indicate once again the primary didactic nature of the social problem film as well as the tackling of subject matter relevant to the current era of the film and how audiences of the historical period perceived such a message.

This phenomenon of historical context and audience reaction created an interesting balance between the teaching nature of the film and its ability to contain an interesting narrative. Oftentimes the earlier films of the classical era can be seen as a bit preachy, often appearing less like a fictional feature and more like a public service announcement. This is displayed in the common occurrence of a teaching moment often near the end of the film where a character will literally give a speech often referring to the social message the film is attempting to portray. Examples can be seen through the judges at the end of Wild Boys of the Road (1933) and Where Are My Children? (1916), both of which provide a lesson in monologue form that almost seems separate from the fictional narrative being presented. This relevance to the problem of the era the film resides in lends a sort of didactic authority to this type of film that others may not have. For instance, Where Are My Children? had trouble getting through the National Board of Review to public release due to reviewers believing that audiences were being provided with misleading information regarding birth control. They believed that the film was more educational in nature rather than a fictional narrative addressing a social issue.

=== Focused narrative on characters and institutions ===
The social problem film often takes a larger social issue during its respective era and displays it in a much more focused way. The problem will be expressed through a narrative often involving a few characters, often a family or an individual that traverses the film world experiencing the perceived social issue. Oftentimes they will interact directly with social institutions meant to display the social problems. The typifying of these institutions is styled based on the overall ideological message of the film, either being portrayed as ineffective or idealized as a proper solution. These can be seen throughout the development of the social problem film and even into contemporary times as the form of the social problem film changed. Examples of this style of narrative are apparent within films such as The Soul of Youth (1920) in which the larger problem of delinquent children with no home is portrayed through the ineffectiveness of the orphanage the protagonist resides in juxtaposed with the idealized life of the family of the judge he eventually settles in with. Another instance that deserves to be mentioned comes once again from Wild Boys of the Road (1933) in which the film reaches its climax as the protagonists are being dealt with by a judge, bringing the larger social issue into an individualist lens by applying the solution of a nationwide problem to a few individual experiences.

Another important social problem film dealing with institutions is the alcoholism themed Days of Wine and Roses (1962). The film follows the progressive demise of a couple due to their inability to control their drinking, once again devolving a larger societal problem onto a focused set of characters. It does, however, offer a solution in the form of the institution of Alcoholics Anonymous which serves as an effective way to treat one's self. A sociological study conducted by Elizabeth Hirschman revealed that the film's portrayal was indeed relatable to addicts and alcoholics who after watching the film viewed AA as a viable option to address their problem. This effect on the real population indicates the interaction that social problem films hope to have on their audience in comparison to films meant to purely entertain while skimming the surface of certain issues.

A more contemporary instance of the focused narrative of characters and institutions in the social problem film is the ineffectiveness and cruelty of the military hospital in Coming Home (1978), a film about returning vets from Vietnam. The mistreatment and negligent behavior affecting all vets in the hospital is reduced to the experiences of two or three characters.

=== Real life insertions and location shooting ===
One aspect that is widely seen within the social problem film is the usage of non-actors to portray either background characters or voices of reason within the narrative as well as the desire to film scenes on location. Both of these factors help lend authenticity and relation to the real world which is essential to the genre. Some notable examples are the inclusion of actual Judge Ben Lindsey playing himself in the previously mentioned film The Soul of Youth (1920). This insertion created an environment the audience knew was based in reality and thus lent a sense of authenticity to the didactic nature this genre possesses. The presence of a figure from the real world directly confronts the idea that the messages displayed in social problem films must be confirmed by real-life counterparts. It lends a sense of integrity reminiscent of journalism or a documentary film.

Location shooting is a factor that although not limited to the social problem film, has grown to exemplify certain factors within the genre. The idea of shooting outside of a studio and in the real environment again strengthens the films authenticity in the same way non-actors do. A film that utilized this style of shooting in order to gain this sense of realism is the previously mentioned Wild Boys of the Road (1933). The film's scenes that are set within the train yard that the children temporarily reside in is shot on location in an actual train yard in Glendale, California.

Perhaps the most notable instance of the idea of real-life insertions is the opening scene of Border Incident (1949), a social problem film about Mexican immigration following the instituting of the Bracero Program in 1942 meant to alleviate the shortage of farm-hand work in the United States. The film opens with a flyover shot of farmland as an unseen narrator describes the landscape, the lack of labor, and the subsequent creation of the bracero program in response. This is an insertion of a program that actively was occurring during the production of this film. This reality-based narrative combines with the voice over, which mentions borders no less than five times to subtly push an ideology of mutual dependency towards the audience while allowing itself the appearance of being an authentic representation of the situation, showing again the effect real life insertions can have on the social problem films ability to affect its viewers.

=== Transit and family ===
Many social problem films contain a theme of transit and the importance of familial relationships. These factors lend further authenticity to the genre as the audience seems to often follow the protagonist as he or she travels a necessary journey to arrive at a viable solution. Internal journeys are often mirrored in literal transportation of the characters. This can be seen in the traveling across the nation in Wild Boys of the Road (1933), the trip to the doctor's office in Where Are My Children? (1916), and the international migration of farmworkers in Border Incident (1949). Similarly, the idea of the family is apparent within this genre, oftentimes the idea of the family is of utmost importance. There is a finality in terms of the protagonist's descent when he or she has lost the trust and support of their family, and thus the social problem is often resolved by a return to these ideals. Although wartime feelings can account for some of this, this theme is maintained throughout the development of the genre. Even in more contemporary social problem films such as Coming Home (1978) and The Good Lie (2014), there is a sense of familial importance, the former in terms of his "brothers" who he stands by no matter what, and the latter in the form of their tribe members who travel thousands of miles for a new life.

== History ==
=== Progressive Era ===
The genre first appeared in the late 1910s and 1920s as an attempt to imbue quality and realism into cinema, a new medium that was struggling to be taken seriously by the American middle class.

Historian Kay Sloan has shown how various reformist groups made social problem shorts and features during the silent era of film. Generally, these dealt with prohibition, labor relations, and concerns over "white slavery." The ideologies of these Pre-World War I productions often aligned with concerns over the worker and the interaction that filmmakers had with real-world problems. This was important to the development of the genre as it was the first foray into displaying issues of the common man but was not successful in terms of offering a viable solution. Rather, the didactic nature of these films indicated an upper-middle class solution to labor issues; oftentimes it would take the presence of a non-working class negotiator to resolve the issues that laborers in the films dealt with.

The discovery of the effect of and utilization of the 'happy ending' was also implemented during this time. The happy ending left a cathartic effect on its audience, leaving them satisfied with the social message being provided. This itself is an imperative to the social problem genre due to its demonstration of directors' and filmmakers' desire to affect social change through movies. As a genre, however, these Progressive statements did not touch off a long-lasting concern in the film industry, which was solidifying behind standardized product, oligopoly, and the star system.

=== 1930s ===
Warner Brothers, under Darryl F. Zanuck, began making topical films "ripped from the headlines." These "headliners" generally were cheaply made, gritty in their realist aesthetic, and foregrounded a working-class milieu and New Deal political sympathies. The social problem films of this era reflected the general national consciousness of the New Deal. Many of these films fed into a populist form of thought meant to instill confidence among the nation in the wake of the Great Depression, supporting the platform of Franklin Delano Roosevelt, which supposedly would alleviate the unemployment issue facing the United States at that time.

These films also put the obligation of finding work on the individual while displaying the benefits of having a neighborly attitude of helping those in need back to sustainable living. This is particularly displayed in such films as Wild Boys of the Road (1933), in which the protagonist runs away from home with friends in an attempt to find work, only to end up arrested and in need of assistance, which is subsequently granted by a judge. The film's interaction with New Deal ideologies is reflected in the confident tone of the judge as he grants aid to the homeless kids presented to him, the progressive nature of neighborly helpfulness is thrust upon the audience without allowing them to contemplate the fact that it took a middle-class figure to save the unemployed.

Just as the New Deal gave confidence in the short term but lagged in long-term growth for employment, so did the social problem films of this time depict a sense of optimism even when stuck in the non-progressive narrative of a middle-class savior.

The most notable work of the genre during this time was Mervy LeRoy's I Am a Fugitive from a Chain Gang (1932), whose success led Warner Brothers and other studios to copy the formula.

Meanwhile, at Columbia Pictures, Frank Capra made his reputation (among the industry and filmgoing public alike; a rarity in that period) by developing his signature blend of social problem film and screwball comedy. Working with writer Robert Riskin, he would develop, repeat, and refine this blend in films like Mr. Deeds Goes to Town (1936), Mr. Smith Goes to Washington (1939), and Meet John Doe (1941).

=== 1940s and postwar films ===
The social problem films of the postwar period marked a noticeable shift away from economic problems to ones of social and psychological adjustment. This is perhaps due to the idea of returning veterans' ability to become reestablished in civilian society. The genre in this climate, into the 1950s, was typified by the works of Samuel Fuller, Elia Kazan, and Douglas Sirk.

As the thoughts and feelings of the nation progressed from worrying about unemployment to the horrors of war and rehabilitation of those suffering from addiction, so did the social problem film adapt to the national consciousness of its time. One national fear was that these returning veterans would be bitter among their return, changed from the horrors they had seen, while also feeling a lack of proper reciprocation back home. Also factoring in was the idea that the nuclear family had been broken up.

Chronicling three returning veterans adjusting to civilian life, The Best Years of Our Lives (William Wyler, 1946) was particularly powerful in that it served as a soothing to the anxieties felt by many Americans about the returning of veterans to society. It addressed post-war social problems through its optimistic portrayal of the struggle for normalization, using a protagonist who had lost both hands in the war, notedly played by Harold Russell, a non-professional actor who had that same experience. The film also depicts the intense male bonding that occurs during wartime in a positive way, showing the support each of the men have for each other. It also shows the struggles they face upon returning to their pre-war lives, although in an attempt to alleviate national anxiety the film ultimately resolves itself into a happy ending in which everything is reconciled. While this film follows the general guidelines of a social problem film from the classic era such as the usage of non-actors, the importance of historical context, a melodramatic feeling, and the didactic nature of the genre, the identification and solution to the social problem is less of a warning to society and more about increasing positive feelings in a nation reeling from the horrors of war.

Social problem film also addressed other specific issues that plagued the postwar environment in America. For instance, Billy Wilder's The Lost Weekend (1945) focused on alcoholism, inaugurating a cycle of films dealing with drug and alcohol abuse; and Gaslight (1944), based on an earlier play, dramatized and became the namesake for the psychologically-abusive technique later known as gaslighting. Touching on mental health, Bedlam (1946) caused outrage among Americans, affecting the already-fragile national attitude of the time.

One social issue that was integrated within United States society was the categorization of minorities together as one group; African Americans, Asian Americans, Jews, and homosexuals were all discriminated against without distinction. However, awareness of this problem was considerably raised through the evils of Nazism and the Holocaust being revealed to the world as a result of this type of hatred. Antisemitism became a worldwide topic of discussion after the suffering endured by the Jewish people, and the social problem film responded by attempts to represent such problem. Some films that tackled anti-Semitism and racism during this time were Pinky (1949) and Home of the Brave (1949). Gentleman's Agreement (1947), in particular, follows a journalist as he decides to pass for Jewish in order to understand their experience. The efforts in Gentleman's Agreement were criticized by Jewish critics for not really delving into Jewish culture at all as well as not going deep enough into the effect of the Holocaust. The film was also seen as depicting anti-Semitism as a nasty habit rather than discrimination. At a commercial level, however, the film succeeded and was able to affect audiences in a way that reduced prejudicial feelings towards Jews.

=== 1950s and 1960s ===
While McCarthyism, in the form of the House Un-American Activities Committee, dampened some of Hollywood's enthusiasm for left-leaning critiques of American society, the genre continued nonetheless over the next two decades. Robert Wise's science-fiction film The Day the Earth Stood Still (1951) urged international cooperation in matters of violence and world security in an environment of Cold War mistrust and nuclear paranoia: the "message" is literally delivered to the Earth by a civilized extraterrestrial. Stanley Kramer's various exposés of racism—The Defiant Ones (1958), Pressure Point (1962), and Guess Who's Coming to Dinner (1967)—became synonymous with the genre. Moreover, "juvenile delinquency films" combined the censorious tone of social problem films with exploitation film and melodrama.

A series of journalistic pieces on the ineffectiveness of mental health facilities also lead to an increase in public awareness about the social problem of mental health care. The national attitude of the time was already in a fragile state due to the public revelation of Nazi horrors. This, combined with the untrusting environment and Cold-War tensions, was reflected in a bevy of films about mental health, the ineffectiveness of treatment, and the way that affected individuals can be helped.

The social problem genre reflected issues of mental health and addiction particularly well through films like Bigger Than Life (1956), which was consequently based on an article titled "Ten Feet Tall" published in The New Yorker. The film follows a protagonist in a healthy, happy familial relationship who is forced to take cortisone for a rare disease, ultimately abusing the medication which then results in mental health issues. The hospital and doctors in the film are shown as incompetent and unwilling to believe anything the patient tells them, even supplying him with more cortisone when he shows drug-seeking behavior.

Bigger Than Life also shows a marked shift from the social problem films of classic Hollywood that was caused by a myriad of factors. In 1948, the Paramount Decrees were instituted after a landmark antitrust case by the United States against the major studios of the time. What followed was a restriction on many forms of distribution, marketing, and time between film runs. This resulted in a shifting of power from the major studios of the time, who thusly needed to find a new way to market their films. The creation of Cinemascope, which widened the aspect ratio allowing for widescreen viewing, and was seen as the beginning of the end of the classical era of Hollywood. Having access to these new technologies that the social problem film, too, would adapt, Bigger Than Life exhibited less didactic speech, instead allowing more interpretation from the audience as to what the social problem was.

=== 1970s ===
A big theme among films of the 1970s was the Vietnam War; films such as The Deer Hunter (1978) and Apocalypse Now (1979) focused on exposing the extreme conditions, both mentally and physically, that soldiers face during deployment.

The social problem film, on the other hand, came back to its common theme of returning veterans, exemplified by the critically acclaimed Coming Home (1978), which followed a woman whose husband was away on tour as she volunteers at the veteran hospital and befriends a crippled soldier. The way in which the film interacts with narrative and with its audience, however, demonstrated a shift in form that reflected attitudes of the time. The period through the 1960s and 1970s was when second-wave feminism became apparent, raising awareness about inequalities regarding many social issues, though it mainly focused on white upper-class feminism. This national consciousness of feminist ideals, combined with a wartime environment that was largely a failure, as well as the inability to fully care for veterans, is expressed through Coming Home's narrative and characters while also maintaining certain factors of the classic social problem film. The feminization of the Vietnam experience can be seen through the protagonist Luke, who is able to allow Sally to transcend her role as a stereotypical military wife, while also feminizing himself as he progresses into his move back to society. The more passive and stereotypically feminine he becomes, the more he is allowed to leave the horrors of Vietnam behind. This type of characterization differs greatly from the characters seen in earlier returning veteran social problem films, which often portrayed the veteran as ultra-masculine and his wife as a traditional homemaker.

Furthermore, the narrative of Coming Home depicts a marked difference from earlier social problem films. Rather than pushing a didactic theme on the audience, the story goes back and forth between didacticism and following more of a soap-opera romance formula. (As result, it is sometimes difficult to discern what the film wants the viewers to focus on.) However, the film does maintain certain characteristics of the social problem film, such as a focused narrative, ending on a didactic speech, and usage of non-actors to portray the veterans at the hospital.

== Contemporary social problem films ==
As the United States transitioned into the contemporary era, the social issues that encompassed the country have adapted to focus on different aspects of the problems, especially in the case of immigration and the veteran experience, both of which feature heavily in the classic social problem film. For instance, the theme of Border Incident (1949) was the immigration of migrant farmworkers from Mexico. The returning-veteran social problem films Best Years Of Our Lives (1946) and Coming Home (1978) focused on the treatment as well as the rehabilitation of veterans.

In the contemporary United States, an immigration social issue that has been relevant for years is the idea of refugee asylum, whereas the returning-veteran storylines now often focus on the addiction to war and the inability to function normally without it.

Sudanese refugees, in particular, are of focus as their country is plagued in civil war, yet asylum in the United States had been blocked due to terrorist fears. A contemporary social problem film that addresses this issue is The Good Lie (2014), which follows the life of a group of Sudanese children as they escape their village to a refugee camp and come to America as adults. The beginning of the film does a decent job of representing the struggle over 25,000 children faced while trekking across Africa enduring the elements, animals, and soldiers trying to kill them as it follows the protagonists as they make the journey themselves, losing some along the way. It utilizes classic techniques such as location shooting at the refugee camp and the usage of real refugees as background characters. However, the film has much more in common with the form of social problem films such as Coming Home. It not only stars a famous actress, Reese Witherspoon, but ultimately utilizes engagement with the narrative much more than trying to preach to its audience. As the protagonist group arrives in America, the film experiences a shift from displaying the plight of these refugees to a culture clash of sorts as they struggle to adapt to American customs and realize the ineffectiveness of the bureaucratic systems meant to help them. Like Coming Home, the audience is not being put in a space where the film is meant to be purely educational, rather they are encouraged to discern the social problem from the drama being displayed. This is shown in the frustration of some reviewers who claim the plot seems manufactured and does not focus enough on certain social issues. This particular aspect of the changing form of the social problem film is largely due to audiences desire to be entertained as well as satiated with a well-formulated story to engage in.

Another instance in which this becomes palpable is in the changing representation of returning veterans. The effects of wartime on American society are fluid depending on the situation and national feelings of the time. This is evident as post-WWII films often focused on a return to home for the veterans, encouraging family life and spousal support, as well as the revealing of the capability of humans to commit evil, resulting in forays into addressing these issues. Then during Vietnam, the feminist movement combined with national feelings of regret created both hyper-masculine films depicting the horror of battle but also the returning veterans plight and a more formulaic approach to narrative instead of a didactic one. The current era, then, is focused on international conflict within the middle east which has created a division in terms of ideology in the US. The social problem film has adapted to encompass these feelings through films such as Green Zone (2010), which addresses the idea of false motivations for entering the war against Iraq.

More pertinent to the social problem film genre, however, is the idea of returning veterans; whereas the treatment of veterans has been displayed on screen, the contemporary social problem goes beyond that scope, and rather into the psyches of the soldiers themselves and the systems that perpetuate their situation. This is done through the depiction of war as an addiction, another type of social problem—a way that films of the 20th century did not consider. This is the case in The Hurt Locker (2009), which depicts an Explosive Ordnance Disposal team in Iraq. Although it did shoot on location in Jordan, utilize non-actors, and focus on a small group of people, the film is much more in line with recent social problem films in that it focuses on characterization, storytelling, and filming stylization to portray its social issue more than straightforward preaching. The film is both cinematic and visceral, interweaving aspects of the war in documentary-like style juxtaposed with the usage of sound and technological advances to create an intense, encapsulating narrative. Again, the viewer is meant to see the protagonist's mundane home life compared to his experience on tour, where he seems more at home. The film begins on a quote that equates war to a drug, and ends on the protagonist's 'days on tour' counter resetting to 0, indicating both the hardship faced by military personnel and how it shapes them into being more like machines built for a purpose rather than purely motivated soldiers. These scenes show a palpable shift from telling the audience how to feel via ending monologue, to displaying the problem and letting audiences interpret it for themselves.

=== Television and social media ===
With the development of new technologies such as television, it was inevitable that programming about social issues would become apparent. From documentaries for social justice to public broadcasting about local issues, the television is able to be accessed in ways movies can't. Certain programming such as The Biggest Loser address a specific social problem such as obesity in a setting which is presented as reality. However, in reality, the whole thing is pretty much scripted. Contestants waive their rights to creating their own story-line and are trained to point of collapsing, not a healthy way to address weight loss. This pseudo-reality is problematic in that it presents a certain social problem, along with a viable solution, like diet and exercise, yet it doesn't speak to the cultural issues and systematic factors like cheap fast food in poverty-stricken areas.

The rise of social media has led to a transformation of many established systems, such as advertising, news, protests, campaigning, and exposure to other cultures. The ability to instantly connect with an event occurring and to share something with the public instantly has led to a new development of networks that can be accessed at the click of a mouse. So just as these other aspects of life were effected so is the idea of the social problem film. The ability for users to obtain, via YouTube, actual real-life video of events occurring around the world makes it tougher for filmic representations to become the didactic entity they need to be in order to fit in the genre. For instance, with over 100,000 results for a search on Iraq war footage, it becomes difficult to depict a sense of reality in which the viewer can relate purely, therefore the filmmaker's artistic influence becomes more apparent. This combined with the development of news programming via television has created a sort of environment where the social problem film was forced to change form, the majority didactic approach was no longer satisfactory as people have access to actual footage, therefore the implementation of deeper characterization and richer narratives became relevant in the more contemporary entries into this genre.

An example of controversial social problem television is 13 Reasons Why as it dealt with teen suicide, rape and bullying.

== Examples ==
Social issues touched on by this genre can include:

- Age and intergenerational conflict
  - The Wrestler (2008)
  - Childhood and adolescence
    - The 400 Blows (1959)
    - Kids (1995)
- Class
  - La Grande Illusion (1937)
  - Parasite (2019)
  - Poverty
    - Hillbilly Elegy (2020)
- Climate and pollution
  - WALL-E (2008)
- Consumer culture
  - Fight Club (1999)
- Crime and delinquency
  - Blackboard Jungle (1955)
- Trafficking and war on drugs
  - Sicario (2015)
- Immigration and immigrant experience
  - Border Incident (1949)
- Education
  - Good Will Hunting (1997)
- Family life and values
  - Where Are My Children? (1916)
  - Ordinary People (1980)
  - Juno (2007)
- Health, mental health, and illness
  - Bigger Than Life (1956)
  - A Child Is Waiting (1963)
  - One Flew Over the Cuckoo's Nest (1975)
  - Substance abuse
    - Leaving Las Vegas (1995)
    - Udta Punjab (2016)
    - Beautiful Boy (2018)
- Labour
  - Modern Times (1936)
  - The Grapes of Wrath (1940)
  - Norma Rae (1979)
  - Germinal (1993)
- Race, racism, and discrimination
  - The Defiant Ones (1958)
  - Pressure Point (1962)
  - Guess Who's Coming to Dinner (1967)
  - In the Heat of the Night (1967)
  - Do the Right Thing (1989)
  - American History X (1998)
  - Crash (2004)
  - District 9 (2009)
  - Green Book (2018)
- Sex discrimination
  - The Children's Hour (1961)
  - Far from Heaven (2002)
  - Brokeback Mountain (2005)
- Social values and pressures
  - Dead Poets Society (1989)
  - 3 Idiots (2009)
- Censorship
  - Storm Center (1956)
- Technology, media, and society
  - Network (1976)
  - Natural Born Killers (1994)
  - The Truman Show (1998)
- Rape
  - Outrage (1950)
- Urban and rural life
  - Boyz N' the Hood (1991)
  - The aforementioned Hillbilly Elegy
- Religion
  - Elmer Gantry (1960)
- Gun violence
  - Bowling for Columbine (2002)
  - American Gun (2005)
- War and veteran life
  - Paths of Glory (1957)
  - The Deer Hunter (1978)
  - Full Metal Jacket (1987)
  - Born on the Fourth of July (1989)
  - The Hurt Locker (2009)

== See also ==
- Message picture
- Social science fiction
- Social thriller
- Very special episode
- Social realism
- Oscar bait
- Identity politics
