= Gordon Jump =

American actor (1932–2003)

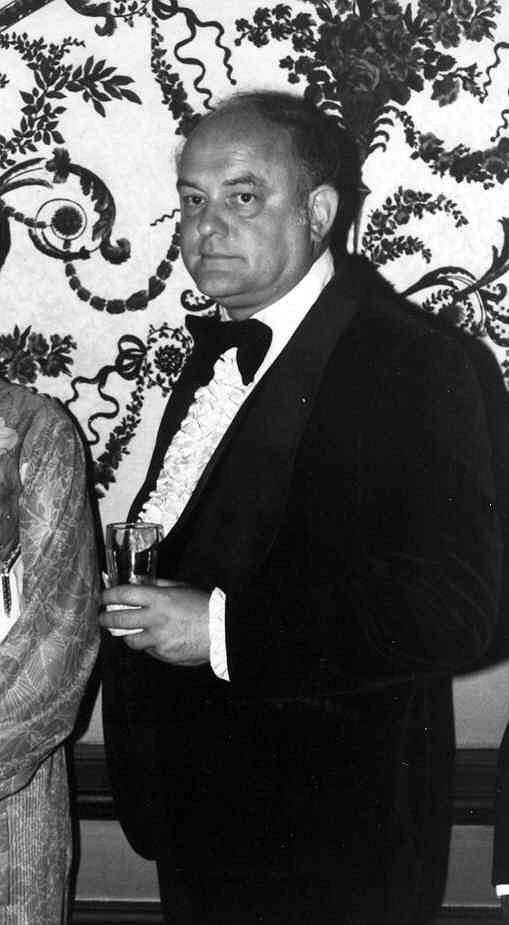
- Jump in 1979
- Born: Alexander Gordon Jump; April 1, 1932; Dayton, Ohio, U.S.
- Died: September 22, 2003 (aged 71); Los Angeles, California, U.S.
- Education: Kansas State University
- Occupation: Actor
- Years active: 1959–2003
- Known for: WKRP in Cincinnati
- Spouses: Olinda D. Kandt (m. 1954; div. 1962); Anna F. Inge Jump (m. 1963; div. 1992); Betty McKeever (m. 1993)
- Children: 4

Alexander Gordon Jump (April 1, 1932 – September 22, 2003) was an American actor best known for playing Arthur "Big Guy" Carlson in the series WKRP in Cincinnati (1978–1982); he reprised the role in its spinoff The New WKRP in Cincinnati (1991–1993). He also played Chief Tinkler in the sitcom Soap (1977–1978) and Mr. Horton on a two-part episode of the sitcom Diff'rent Strokes (1983). He appeared in Maytag commercials as the "Maytag repairman" from 1989 until he retired in 2003.

== Early life ==
Born Alexander Gordon Jump, Jump was raised in Centerville, a suburb of Dayton, Ohio. He graduated from Centerville High School and enrolled in Otterbein College. After his first year, he transferred to Kansas State University studying broadcasting and communication; he was a member of Kappa Sigma fraternity. He got his first television job with WIBW-TV in Topeka. He dabbled in "writing, producing, and directing" while at the station. Jump was the title character in WIBW's "WIB the Clown", an educational children's program. He reported the weather on the channel and was not always able to get his clown makeup off in time.

In September 1961, he returned to Dayton and joined WLWD as the station's director of special broadcast services. He continued as a producer and on-air personality at WLWD, hosting Gordon Jump's Fun Time, a popular show for younger children, and High Time, a variety series, before moving to Los Angeles in 1963 to pursue acting. Later in his life, Jump converted and became a member of the Church of Jesus Christ of Latter-day Saints (LDS Church).

== Career ==
Jump's acting career began when he was 32. Jump participated in a theatre production at the Glendale Centre Theatre in Glendale, California, where he was noticed and offered an agent. The theatre was owned by Nathan and Ruth Hale, who were members of the LDS Church. It was there that Jump first learned about the LDS Church.

Jump's first break on television was his guest role as Marcus Clements in CBS's Daniel Boone, where he had eight lines. During the 1960s, he landed minor roles in television on such shows as Get Smart, Lancer, Here Come the Brides, and Green Acres.

In the 1960s, Jump converted to the LDS Church. He acted in several church-produced instructional and educational productions, including When Thou Art Converted (1967), Pioneers In Petticoats (1969), and What About Thad? (1970). In 1967, he played the role of Lehi in the Burbank pageant People of the Book. He appeared as Peter, the apostle, in a 1969 film which was used in some of the church's temple ceremonies. He also acted in The Singles Ward in 2002, a LDS comedy series. He and Robert Starling, an independent filmmaker, began Associated Latter-day Media Artists.

Jump's first recurring role came in 1977, as Chief of Police Tinkler in Soap. In 1978, he landed his signature role of Arthur "Big Guy" Carlson on the situation comedy WKRP in Cincinnati, portraying a bumbling radio station manager. Jump stated that the character of Arthur Carlson was based on a real-world WQXI executive.

After WKRP in Cincinnati was cancelled in 1982, Jump made appearances on many other shows. These appearances include The Love Boat, Night Court, The Golden Girls, Murder, She Wrote, and Who's the Boss? He had a recurring role as Maggie Seaver's father on Growing Pains.

On a two part episode of Diff'rent Strokes titled "The Bicycle Man", he played Mr. Horton, the owner of a bicycle shop who attempts to molest series protagonist Arnold Jackson and his friend, Dudley. While his Los Angeles Times obituary called this role a "daring career turn", Genevieve Koski at the AV Club's roundtable found the laugh track that played during the scene in which the boys see nude photographs "horrifying". Koski's fellow roundtable member Donna Bowman disagreed, stating that the special humanized the situation.

In 1989, Jump took over the Maytag repairman role from Jesse White. In the 1990s, Jump starred in a two-season revival of WKRP in Cincinnati entitled The New WKRP in Cincinnati. He appeared in the ninth and final season of Seinfeld, in which he played George Costanza's boss at a playground equipment company over two episodes. His last movie role was in the 2004 film Changing of the Guard, released after his death.

== Inspiration and spirituality ==
Jump believed the film and television industry to be "the most powerful tool" that can "communicate" and "give... a positive outlook of life to many people." According to his personal religious faith, he also believed theatre and television had the ability to uplift and edify individuals and felt that God uses a similar medium to guide his children.

When scripts required Jump to act in ways that went against his religious convictions, he said that his acting required the same "honesty and judiciousness" as the rest of his life. He portrayed the fictional character as accurately as possible to deliver an honest representation of the story to his audience. He warned against portraying all theatrical characters like "missionaries", and instead encouraged actors to "stay true to their craft", through which their inner virtue would shine through. Additionally, Jump did not believe in censorship, claiming that "if you teach people correct principles, they can govern themselves", which is a paraphrase of a teaching by Joseph Smith.

When Jump was offered the role of Chief Tinkler in Soap, he and the LDS Church bishop of his church were wary that the content of the program was contrary to his faith. Jump returned to the producers the next day with the intention of refusing the role. The directors heard his concerns and suggested that the underlying messages of the show were more aligned to his beliefs as a Latter-day Saint than he realized; he was encouraged to read the "retribution scenes" in the script. Impressed by the depth of the lessons told through humor, Jump took the role in Soap and recommended that viewers of faith evaluate the lessons taught by the finished artistic product of a film or show rather than evaluate whether an actor would actually do some of the things which they portray on screen.

== Death ==
Jump died on September 22, 2003, from pulmonary fibrosis that led to respiratory failure at his home near Los Angeles. He is interred at the El Toro Memorial Park in Lake Forest, California.

== Filmography ==
=== Film ===
Year	Title	Role	Notes	Citation
1965	Marriage- What Kind For You?	Business Man at the New Years party	LDS Church film	
1967	When Thou Art Converted	Typewriter Boss and Elders Quorum President	LDS Church film	
1969	Pioneers In Petticoats		LDS Church film	
1969	What About Thad?	Bishop in the LDS Church	LDS Church film	
1969	Flareup	Security Guard		
1969	Church of Jesus Christ of Latter-day Saints Temple Film	The Apostle Peter		
1970	Ransom Money			
1972	Conquest of the Planet of the Apes	Auctioneer		
1972	Trouble Man	Salter		
1972	Rolling Man			
1975	A Cry For Help	Lloyd Hogan		
1976	Sybil			
1977	Skateboard	Harris		
1978	Ruby and Oswald			
1978	The Guilty		LDS Church film.	
1978	The Fury	Nuckells		
1978	House Calls	Dr. O'Brien		
1978	The Small One	Joseph	Voice, Short animated film	
1979	Goldie and the Boxer	Alex		
1979	Evidence of Power	Dr. Lawson		
1980	Mr. Krueger's Christmas	Narrator	LDS Church film	
1981	Midnight Offerings			
1982	For Lovers Only	Harvey Pugh		
1982	Families are Forever		LDS church film	
1984	Making the Grade	Mr. Harriman		
1985	Darlin' Clementine			
1987	Perry Mason: The Case of the Lost Love			
1987	On Fire			
1988	Moving	Simon Eberhart		
1988	Justin Case	Sheldon Wannamaker		
1990	Honeymoon Academy	Mr. Nelson	Alternative title: For Better or For Worse	
1994	Bitter Vengeance	Arnold Fulmer		
1999	A Dog's Tale	Professor Thadeus A. Widstone		
2002	The Singles Ward	An Airline Passenger		
2003	Dismembered			

=== Television ===
Year	Title	Role	Notes	Citation
1965	Daniel Boone	Marcus Clements	1 episode	
1966	Get Smart	Hobson	2 episodes "Casablanca" "Maxwell Smart, Private Eye"	
1967	T.H.E. Cat		1 episode	
1968	Green Acres	Surveyor	1 episode: "How to Get from Hooterville to Pixley Without Moving".	
1968	Lancer		1 episode "The Homecoming"	
1970	Mannix	Charlie	1 episode "Once upon a Saturday"	
1970–1974	The Partridge Family	Man #2 / Zack Feldman / Father	7 episodes	
1970	The Brady Bunch	Mechanic / Collins	2 episodes	
1970	The Young Rebels		1 episode "The Hostages"	
1970–1973	Love, American Style			
1971	The Doris Day Show	Mr. Robinson	1 episode	
1971	Bewitched		2 episodes "The Return of Darrin the Bold" "Money Happy Returns"	
1971	Cade's County		1 episode "Violent Echo"	
1971-1974	Partridge Family		4 episodes "The Strike-Out King (1973)" "Art For Mom's Sake (1974)"	
1971-1973	Love, American Style		2 episodes "Love and the Bowling Ball (1971)" "Love and the Suspicious Husband (1973)"	
1971-1973	The New Dick Van Dyke Show		1 episode	
1972–1973	The Mary Tyler Moore Show	Hank Morton / Judy's Father	2 episodes "The Courtship of Mary's Father's Daughter (1972)"	
1973	A Touch of Grace	Greenwald	1 episode	
1973	The Paul Lynde Show	Larry	1 episode "The Congressman's Son"	
1974	Chase		1 episode "$35 Will Fly You to the Moon"	
1974	Kojak	Jonas	1 episode "Slay Ride"	
1974	The Apple's Way			
1974	McCloud			
1974	Paul Sand in Friends and Lovers	Mr. Mead	1 episode	
1974	Girl With Something Extra		1 episode "Guess Who's Feeding the Pigeons?"	
1975-1976	The Rockford Files	Freddie	2 episodes "Just By Accident (1975)" "A Bad Deal in the Valley (1976)"	
1974–1975	That's My Mama	Officer O'Reilley	3 episodes "The Last Haircut (1974)"	
1975	Harry O		2 episodes "Anatomy of a Frame" & "Lester II"	
1975	Police Woman		1 episode "No Place to Hide"	
1975	Starsky and Hutch			
1975	The Streets of San Francisco	Sergeant Lacy	1 episode	
1975	Switch		1 episode "Stung From Behind"	
1975	ABC Afterschool Special		1 episode "Fawn Story"	
1975	The Lost Saucer	The Mayor	1 episode "The Tiny Years"	
1976	The Bionic Woman	Charles Butler	1 episode "Welcome Home, Jaime"	
1976	McMillan & Wife			
1976	Rich Man, Poor Man	Dr. Simms	1 episode	
1976	Alice	Sheriff McElroy	1 episode	
1976	McDuff, the Talking Dog	Amos Ferguson	11 episodes	
1976	Archie	Mr. Andrews	1 episode "Pilot"	
1977	Black Sheep Squadron		1 episode "Last One for Hutch"	
1977	Good Times			
1977	Lou Grant	National Editor	6 episodes	
1977	The Hardy Boys/Nancy Drew Mysteries	Officer Hooper	1 episode "Mystery of the Diamond Triangle"	
1977-1978	Soap	Chief of Police Tinkler	12 episodes	
1978	The Incredible Hulk	Mac	1 episode	
1978–1982	WKRP in Cincinnati	Arthur "Big Guy" Carlson, Station Manager	88 episodes (90 in syndication)	
1980-1987	The Love Boat		6 episodes "The Invisible Maniac (1980)" "Putting on the Dog (1983)" "Aerobic April (1983)" "Frat Wars (1986)" "Who Killed Maxwell Thorn? (1987)"	
1981	Project Peacock		1 episode "The Big Stuffed Dog (special)"	
1983	Diff'rent Strokes	Mr. Horton	2 episodes: "The Bicycle Man" (two parts)	
1983	Just a Little More Love		(NBC special)	
1983	Great Day		1 episode "Pilot"	
1984	Second Edition		1 episode "Pilot"	
1985	CBS Children's Mystery Theatre		1 episode "The Dirkin Detective Agency"	
1985	Night Court	American agent	1 episode "World War III"	
1985	Amazing Stories		1 episode "Guilt Trip"	
1985	Tall Tales & Legends	Mr. Ripple	1 episode	
1986–1991	Growing Pains	Ed Malone	11 episodes	
1986	Simon & Simon	Ross Garrett	1 episode "Camp Apollo"	
1986	New Love American Style		1 episode "Love and the Balcony"	
1986	The Golden Girls	Leonard Barton	1 episode	
1986	Murder, She Wrote	Mayor Tilly	1 episode: "If the Frame Fits"	
1987	What a Country		1 episode "The Love Potion"	
1988	Who's the Boss?	Archie	1 episode	
1989	Sister Kate	Lucas Underwood	1 episode	
1991–1993	The New WKRP in Cincinnati	Arthur 'Big Guy' Carlson	46 episodes	
1994	Baywatch	Max Edelman	2 episodes	
1994	Kino's Storytime	Himself, narrator of Horton Hatches the Egg	1 episode	
1995	Empty Nest	Bud	1 episode	
1997	Married... with Children	Mr. Tot	1 episode	
1997	Seinfeld	Mr. Thomassoulo	2 episodes	
1998	Mike Hammer, Private Eye	Augustus Hancock Sterling, The General	2 episodes	

Preceded by Jesse White	Maytag Repairman; 1989–2003	Succeeded by Hardy Rawls
