= Gloria McGehee =

American film and television actress

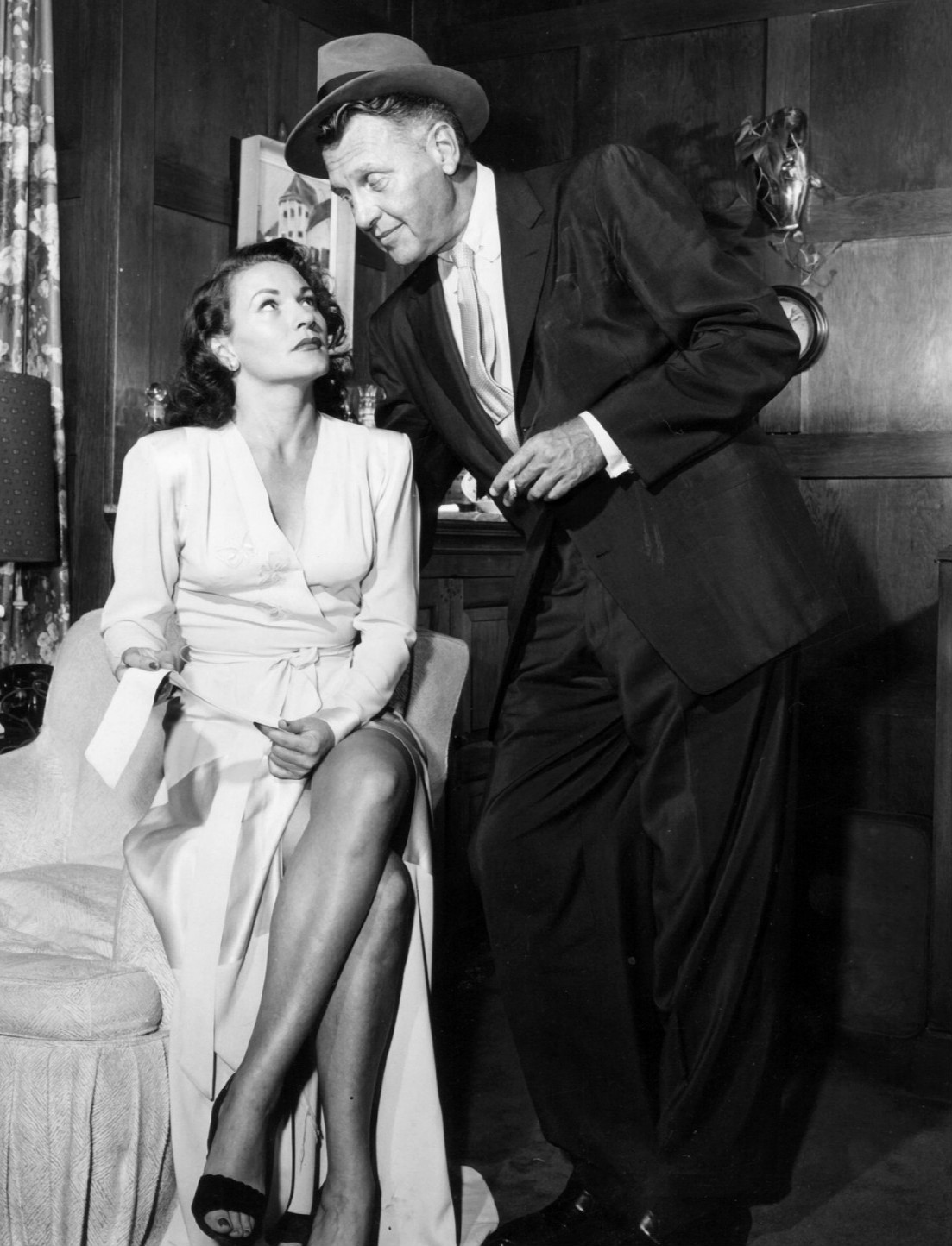
- McGehee (left) with Ralph Bellamy in Man Against Crime, 1953
- Born: Gloria Leonora McGehee; January 9, 1922; Meadville, Mississippi, U.S.
- Died: May 4, 1964 (aged 42); Meadville, Mississippi, U.S.
- Occupations: Film and television actress
- Years active: 1952–1964
- Spouse(s): Alfred E Bruch (m. 1941; div. 1945) Basil Heatter (1946-1951) (divorced); Dail Dunaway (1963-1964) (her death)

Gloria Leonora McGehee (January 9, 1922 – May 4, 1964) was an American film and television actress. She was sometimes billed as Gloria McGhee.

== Early years ==
McGehee was born in Mississippi. She was the daughter of Mr. and Mrs. Dan R. McGehee. Her father was a member of the United States House of Representatives for 16 years. She attended Alice Deal Junior High School and Western High School.

She sang with hotel bands during her time as a student at George Washington University, and she began an apprenticeship at the Provincetown Playhouse in 1946.

In the late 1930s or early 1940s she changed her name to Gloria McGhee because so many people mispronounced her last name.

== Career ==
In the late 1930s and early 1940s McGehee sang in night clubs and with Joe Baldwin's band.

After McGehee went to New York, she danced in the chorus, had a bit part, and was the lead's understudy in the musical comedy Glad to See You.

She starred in the films The Boss and Sierra Stranger, and guest-starred in three episodes of the western television series Gunsmoke and the episode "The Case of the Crimson Kiss" in the 1957 season of the legal drama series Perry Mason.

Radio programs on which McGehee worked included Brighter Tomorrow, Mollé Mystery Theatre, and True Detective Mysteries.

== Personal life and death ==
McGehee married Alfred E. Bruch on January 15, 1941, in Washington, D. C. They were divorced on April 25, 1945. She died in May 1964 of a heart attack in Meadville, Mississippi, at the age of 42. She was buried in Midway Cemetery.

== Partial filmography ==
- The Boss (1956) - Lorry Reed
- Sierra Stranger (1957) - Meg Anderson
- A Child Is Waiting (1963) - Mattie
