= Then Came You (TV series) =

- Genre: Comedy
- Created by: Jeff Strauss; Betsy Thomas
- Starring: Susan Floyd; Thomas Newton; Colin Ferguson; Desmond Askew; Miriam Shor
- Composers: David A. King; Julie Ritter
- Country of origin: United States
- Original language: English
- No. of seasons: 1
- No. of episodes: 13 (7 unaired)

Production
- Running time: 30 minutes
- Production companies: Jeff Strauss Productions; 20th Century Fox Television

Original release
- Network: ABC
- Release: March 22 – April 26, 2000

Then Came You is a half-hour sitcom that aired on ABC for two months from March 22 to April 26, 2000. The show dealt with the romantic relationship between a young man and an older woman. It starred Susan Floyd, Thomas Newton, and Desmond Askew.

This wasn't the first time ABC greenlighted a sitcom with this title. Then Came You was also the proposed title for the show that ultimately became the 1980s sitcom Webster (only used before its premiere).

== Cast ==
- Susan Floyd as Billie Thornton
- Thomas Newton as Aidan Wheeler
- Miriam Shor as Cheryl Sominsky
- Desmond Askew as Ed
- Colin Ferguson as Lewis Peters
- Winston J. Rochas as Manuel

== Episodes ==
No.	Title	Directed by	Written by	Original release date	Prod. code
1	"Then Came You"	Michael Lessac	Betsy Thomas & Jeff Strauss	March 22, 2000	1ADL79
2	"Then Came Two Birthdays"	Mark Cendrowski	Rich Kaplan	March 29, 2000	1ADL05
3	"Then Came a Wedding"	Leonard R. Garner Jr.	Jennifer Levin	April 5, 2000	1ADL04
4	"Then Came the Immaculate Deception"	Mark Cendrowski	Betsy Thomas	April 19, 2000	1ADL10
5	"Then Came Cousin Aidan"	Ted Wass	Jenna Jolovitz	April 19, 2000	1ADL12
6	"Then Came the Monthiversary"	Gail Mancuso	Douglas Lieblein	April 26, 2000	1ADL09
7	"Then Came Dog Trouble"	TBD	Jeff Strauss	Unaired	1ADL07
8	"Then Came Aidan's Ex"	TBD	Jay Dyer	Unaired	1ADL02
9	"Then Came Aidan's Apartment"	TBD	Jenna Jolovitz	Unaired	1ADL03
10	"Then Came a Reasonable Division of Personal Property"	TBD	Betsy Thomas	Unaired	1ADL06
11	"Then Came the Place on Orchard Street"	TBD	Jeff Strauss	Unaired	1ADL08
12	"Then Came Lunch"	TBD	Betsy Thomas & Jeff Strauss	Unaired	1ADL01
13	"Then Came a Hard-Earned Admission"	TBD	Mark Stegemann	Unaired	1ADL11
