= Message picture =

Film intended to communicate sociopolitical ideas as well as entertain

A message picture (or message movie) is a motion picture which, in addition to or instead of being for entertainment purposes, intends to communicate a certain message or ideal about society.

== Characteristics ==
Message pictures usually present the message that they want to deliver in the form of a morality play, and are typically serious (often somber) works. However, not all message pictures are entirely serious and there are also films spoofing the genre, such as Sullivan's Travels.

== History ==
Dore Schary was famous for his message pictures at Metro-Goldwyn-Mayer during the late 1940s and early to mid-1950s. Among these were Tea and Sympathy, Bad Day at Black Rock, and Blackboard Jungle. Other famous message pictures by other parties include Guess Who's Coming to Dinner and In the Heat of the Night (the former directed by Stanley Kramer, who was also well known for numerous message films).

In Indian cinema, B.R. Chopra was known for message pictures. Examples include Kanoon (against capital punishment), Naya Daur (importance of labour), Waqt (importance of time and destiny), Nikaah (against triple talaq (divorce) among Muslims), etc.

== Examples ==
Year	Film
1940	The Grapes of Wrath
1946	It's a Wonderful Life
1954	On the Waterfront
1954	Salt of the Earth
1955	Bad Day at Black Rock
1955	Blackboard Jungle
1956	Tea and Sympathy
1957	Paths of Glory
1958	I Want to Live!
1959	On the Beach
1960	Psycho
1961	Judgment at Nuremberg
1961	The Connection
1962	The Manchurian Candidate
1962	To Kill a Mockingbird
1962	The Intruder
1963	A Child Is Waiting
1964	Fail Safe
1964	Seconds
1967	Guess Who's Coming to Dinner
1967	In the Heat of the Night
1971	Billy Jack
1978	The Deer Hunter
1982	Gandhi
1982	White Dog
1985	The Color Purple
1988	Stand and Deliver
1989	Born on the Fourth of July
1989	Do the Right Thing
1993	Philadelphia
1993	Schindler's List
1997	Amistad
1998	American History X
1999	American Beauty
1999	The Cider House Rules
1999	Music of the Heart
2000	Erin Brockovich
2000	Pay It Forward
2000	Remember the Titans
2001	The Devil's Backbone
2001	I Am Sam
2003	House of Sand and Fog
2004	The Sea Inside
2004	Crash
2004	Woman Thou Art Loosed
2005	American Gun
2006	Akeelah and the Bee
2006	Babel
2006	Blood Diamond
2006	Coach Carter
2008	Wall-E
2009	Avatar
2011	Courageous
2011	God Bless America
2015	Where to Invade Next
2017	Get Out
2018	The Hate U Give
2019	Us
2021	Don't Look Up
2022	Everything Everywhere All at Once
2022	Barbarian
2022	Smile
2022	X
2022	Pearl
2023	M3GAN
2023	Barbie
2023	Ruby Gillman, Teenage Kraken
2023	Oppenheimer
2023	The Zone of Interest

=== Notable directors ===
- Spike Lee
- Stanley Kramer
- Tom Laughlin
- Elia Kazan
- Oliver Stone
- Abel Gance
- Norman Jewison
- Frank Capra
- Richard Attenborough
- Edward Dmytryk
- Jordan Peele

== See also ==
- After-school special
- Christian film
- Just-world hypothesis
- Melodrama
- Oscar bait
- Public service announcement
- Social guidance film
- Social issues
- Social parasitism (offense)
- Social problem film
- Social thriller
- Very special episode
- Virtue signaling
