= The Boss (1956 film) =

1956 film by Byron Haskin

- Directed by: Byron Haskin
- Screenplay by: Dalton Trumbo; Ben Perry (as Ben L. Perry)
- Story by: Ben Perry (as Ben L. Perry)
- Produced by: Frank N. Seltzer
- Starring: John Payne
- Cinematography: Hal Mohr
- Edited by: Ralph Dawson
- Music by: Albert Glasser
- Color process: Black and white
- Production companies: Frank Seltzer Productions; Window Productions
- Distributed by: United Artists
- Release date: October 10, 1956
- Running time: 89 minutes
- Country: United States
- Language: English

The Boss is a 1956 American crime film noir directed by Byron Haskin and starring John Payne.

== Plot ==
Matt Brady comes home from World War I to a city where his older brother Tim is a political kingpin. Matt meets an old friend, Bob Herrick, but an argument leads to a fistfight. He ends up late for a date with Elsie Reynolds, who is furious. Matt angrily replies that he wants nothing more to do with her.

Matt's self-destructive behavior continues at a restaurant, where he intervenes on behalf of a forlorn customer, Lorry Reed, punching a waiter. He not only takes sympathy on her, he impulsively insists they get married.

Regretting his actions the next day, Matt's temper again flares when Tim Brady decides to get the marriage annulled. Matt tells him to mind his own business. Minutes later, Tim dies of a heart attack.

Years go by. Matt, still in a loveless marriage with Lorry, has followed his brother into politics. His unethical methods include making money on a tip from gangster Johnny Mazia and claiming half the profits of a cement business in exchange for guaranteeing it city projects. Bob has married Elsie, meanwhile, and become Matt's lawyer and insurance commissioner.

Matt continues to mistreat Lorry, even giving her a very expensive necklace only to make Elsie envious. A newspaper editor and prosecutor begin investigating Matt, whose net worth also vanishes with the stock market's crash. He goes into business with gangster Johnny, inadvertently becoming an accomplice in a killing spree.

An effort to make things right leads to a fight resulting in Johnny's death, but Matt is indicted and shocked when Bob testifies against him. Lorry leaves, telling Matt how he deluded himself that he had even one friend. Matt ends up by himself, behind bars.

== Cast ==
- John Payne as Matt Brady
- William Bishop as Bob Herrick
- Gloria McGehee as Lorry Reed (as Gloria McGhee)
- Doe Avedon as Elsie Reynolds
- Roy Roberts as Tim Brady
- Rhys Williams as Stanley Millard
- Joe Flynn as Ernie Jackson
- Robin Morse as Johnny Mazia
- William Phipps as Stitch (as Bill Phipps)
- Gil Lamb as Henry
- George Lynn as Tom Masterson
- Bob Morgan as Hamead

== See also ==
- List of American films of 1956
