= Clay Earl Jackson =

- Born: January 28, 1974 (age 52); Richmond, Virginia, U.S.
- Education: North Carolina Wesleyan College
- Occupation: Actor
- Years active: 1999–present

Clayton Earl Jackson (born January 28, 1974) is an American actor, most notable for being cast in the part of the Maytag Repairman from 2007 to 2014.

== Life and career ==
Jackson was born on January 28, 1974, in Richmond, Virginia, United States.

He graduated from North Carolina Wesleyan College in 1997, where he studied drama and was a member of Sigma Pi fraternity. Also in the same year, he began his acting career after moving to New York City and worked as a professional stage actor and singer until 2000.

Clay first appeared on television in 1999 in a national commercial for Tostitos starring Bill Parcells. In 2000, he stepped away from working as an actor and singer to work for his family's real estate agency in Richmond, Virginia.

On April 2, 2007, Clay beat out at least 1,500 applicants in a nationwide search to become the new face of the iconic, lonely Maytag repairman.

He continued portraying the Maytag Repairman until 2014, when he was replaced by Colin Ferguson.

In August 2026, he become an Executive Director for the Carteret Community Theatre in North Carolina.

== Personal life ==
Jackson is married. At the time of his casting as the Maytag Repairman in 2007, he had a two-year-old daughter, and his wife was expecting their second child. He described taking the role as a family decision.

== Filmography ==
Year	Title	Role	Notes	Citation
2007–2014	The Maytag Repairman	Ol' Lonely	30+ commercials	

Preceded by Hardy Rawls	Maytag Repairman; 2007–2014	Succeeded by Colin Ferguson
