= Hardy Rawls =

Actor

- Occupation: Actor
- Known for: Acting in The Adventures of Pete & Pete

Hardy Rawls is a character actor. In 2003, Adweek and Ad Age described Rawls's best-known role as that of the father on Nickelodeon's The Adventures of Pete & Pete. For Maytag's 2004 marketing campaign, Rawls became the third actor to portray Ol' Lonely, replacing the retiring Gordon Jump; Rawls was, in turn, replaced by Richmond, Virginia real estate broker Clay Jackson on April 2, 2007. Rawls also performed in NBC's 1987 television film Bates Motel.

Preceded by Gordon Jump	Maytag Repairman; 2003–2007	Succeeded by Clay Earl Jackson
