= Very special episode =

Advertisement term used for television specials dealing with social issues

"Very special episode" is an advertising term originally used in American television promos to refer to an episode of a sitcom or drama series which deals with a difficult or controversial social issue. There is no one uniform definition for what a "very special episode" is, but it is determined by a TV show's atypical serious subject manner compared to its usual content. The usage of the term peaked in the 1980s. Despite their intentions, "very special episodes" are sometimes dismissed as showing inauthentic, simplistic solutions to complex problems.

== Overview and legacy ==
=== History ===
Traditionally, very special episodes contained either a brief message from the cast or a title card reading either "Viewer Discretion Advised" or "Parental Discretion Advised", alerting viewers to the potentially graphic or disturbing nature of the episode and giving them time to decide if they wanted to watch it. The format emerged in the 1970s, particularly with the socially conscious sitcoms produced by Norman Lear, and flourished in the 1980s into the early 1990s.

=== Topics ===
"Very special episodes" often have storylines having to do with abortion, birth control, sex education, racism, sexism, death, narcotics, pregnancy (particularly teenage pregnancy and unintended pregnancy), asthma, hitchhiking, kidnapping, suicide, drunk driving, drug use, sexual abuse, child abuse, child abandonment, sexual assault, violence (domestic, gang), cults and HIV/AIDS, among other things.

=== Portrayals ===
How a topic is portrayed can vary drastically from show to show, and its portrayal is influenced by a number of factors, including the personal beliefs of those involved in the show, advertising concerns, cultural attitudes, and the show's format, genre, and broadcasting company. The Atlantic summarizes the core values of a very special episode as thus:

The main characters beloved by viewers would inevitably avoid serious harm. The dangers posed by story lines were more threats than actual occurrences, and on the occasion that bad things did happen, they usually happened to ancillary characters whom audiences cared less about. This selective meting of moral justice kept lessons from becoming too morbid, while still allowing episodes to serve as cautionary tales.

=== Public reception ===
The purpose of a very special episode is generally to raise awareness of an issue and encourage those affected to seek help if necessary. For example, the Diff'rent Strokes episode "The Bicycle Man", in the same year it was released, influenced a child in La Porte, Indiana, to inform his mother of a pedophile in the area, and the LaPorte police department credited the episode for the man's arrest. The Washington Post called the episode "a calm, careful and intelligent treatment of a difficult and potentially traumatizing subject. There seems little possibility that watching this program would do children harm, and considerable likelihood it could do them good."

=== In popular culture ===
Comedian Frank Caliendo spoofed this concept with "TV Promos" and "A Very Special Seinfeld" on his 2002 album Make the Voices Stop.

Notably, Larry David, producer and co-creator of Seinfeld, was reportedly strongly opposed to having a very special episode in the series, with the motto of writers and cast being "No hugging, no learning".

NPR referred to a 2018 episode of The Bachelor as a modern "very special episode" when Caelynn Miller-Keyes opened up about being sexually assaulted in college. This came after a 2017 controversy over possible sexual assault occurring on one of The Bachelor's other shows, Bachelor in Paradise. While the cast had a sit down chat about the scandal, the public's response was not favorable.

== Notable examples ==
- All in the Family (1971–1979)
  - "Edith's 50th Birthday" (Season 8, Episode 4, aired October 16, 1977) – Edith Bunker, believing a serial rapist to be a police officer, lets him into her home and is almost sexually assaulted by him.
- Boy Meets World (1993–2000)
  - "Dangerous Secret" (Season 4, Episode 8, aired November 8, 1996) – Cory Matthews and Shawn Hunter discover that one of their classmates, Claire Ferguson, is being abused by her father. After confiding in Cory's parents, the boys inform the police of the situation and send Claire to live with her aunt, in order to keep her safe.
  - "Cult Fiction" (Season 4, Episode 21, aired April 25, 1997) – Shawn is under the influence of a sinister cult.
- Captain Planet and the Planeteers (1990–1996)
  - "Mind Pollution" (Season 2, Episode 1, aired September 14, 1991) – Linka visits her cousin Boris in Washington, D.C., and soon finds that he is under the influence of a street drug known as "Bliss", peddled by the Eco-Villain Verminous Skumm. Boris gets Linka addicted to Bliss by sneaking it into her food. In the episode's climax, Skumm offers Boris a bottle of Bliss in exchange for destroying the Planeteers. Boris agrees and swallows a handful of pills; as the Planeteers stop Linka from doing the same, Boris overdoses and dies on-screen. This tragedy causes Linka to break free of her addiction.
  - "A Formula for Hate" (Season 3, Episode 11, aired November 21, 1992) – A high-school basketball player named Todd Andrews (voiced by Neil Patrick Harris) finds out he has tested positive for HIV; Verminous Skumm uses this opportunity to spread untrue rumors about HIV/AIDS, which turns Todd's schoolmates against him.
  - "'Teers in the Hood" (Season 4, Episode 22, aired May 14, 1994) – When an old friend of Gi, a teacher, is caught in the middle of a gang war and is nearly killed, the Planeteers infiltrate the two feuding gangs to put an end to the violence. The likenesses and speeches of peace activists such as Martin Luther King Jr., Mahatma Gandhi, and John F. Kennedy are used within the episode.
- Degrassi: The Next Generation
  - "Time Stands Still" (Season 4, Episode 7/8, aired October 5, 2004 and October 12, 2004, in two parts) – After Rick Murray suffers a public humiliation at the hands of his classmates, he brings a gun to school and begins shooting those who were responsible, paralyzing one and ending up dead from his own weapon when attempting to kill another.
- Diff'rent Strokes (1978–1986)
  - "The Bicycle Man" (Season 5, Episode 16/17, aired February 5, 1983, and February 12, 1983, in two parts) – Arnold, along with friend Dudley, are targeted by a pedophile who owns a local bike shop and has sexually abused children in the past. Arnold's would-be abuser is arrested after Arnold confides in his father.
  - "The Hitchhikers" (Season 6, Episode 14/15, aired January 28, 1984, and February 4, 1984, in two parts) – Arnold and Kimberly hitchhike home for their father's birthday party. They are picked up by a man who plans to rape Kimberly. Arnold manages to escape and alert the police just in time to arrest the man.
- Dinosaurs (1991–1994)
  - "Changing Nature" (season 5, episode 14, aired July 20, 1994) — Earl Sinclair's employer Wesayso inadvertently disrupts a crucial insect migration pattern, and the company's and Earl's efforts to fix the problem instead cause an escalating chain of environmental disasters that doom all of the characters to slowly freeze to death, as an in-universe analog to the real-life extinction of the dinosaurs.
- The Fresh Prince of Bel-Air (1990–1996)
  - "Mistaken Identity" (Season 1, Episode 6, aired October 15, 1990) – While driving to Palm Springs in a Mercedes-Benz that belongs to Phillip Banks's white colleague, Will and Carlton are picked up by two white police officers who accuse the two of being car thieves.
  - "Just Say Yo" (Season 3, Episode 19, aired February 15, 1993) – Will is given speed to stay up. At the senior prom, Carlton, mistaking them for vitamins, takes them, and collapses on the dance floor. He covers for Will, who comes clean to Phillip and Vivian, breaking down.
  - "Bullets Over Bel-Air" (Season 5, Episode 15, aired February 6, 1995) – Will and Carlton, while withdrawing money from an ATM, are robbed at gunpoint, and Will is shot and hospitalized, causing Carlton to suffer from posttraumatic stress disorder, and leading him to purchase a handgun for his own protection, of which Will disapproves.
- Full House (1987–1995)
  - "Aftershocks" (Season 3, Episode 11, aired December 8, 1989) – Stephanie goes to therapy after experiencing trauma-induced anxiety from an earthquake.
  - "Shape Up" (Season 4, Episode 8, aired November 9, 1990) – D.J., in preparation for an upcoming pool party, stops eating and starts exercising vigorously, both common symptoms of anorexia nervosa.
  - "Silence Is Not Golden" (Season 6, Episode 17, aired February 16, 1993) – Stephanie learns that her classmate is a victim of child abuse by his father and feels conflicted as to whether she should tell an adult.
  - "Fast Friends" (Season 7, Episode 5, aired Oct 12, 1993) – Stephanie's friends peer pressure her to smoke cigarettes.
  - "Under the Influence" (Season 8, Episode 10, aired December 6, 1994) – Kimmy attempts to drunk drive after attending a fraternity party and DJ stops her, causing tension in their friendship.
- The Golden Girls (1985–1992)
  - "Isn't It Romantic?" (Season 2, Episode 5, aired November 8, 1986) – Dorothy's friend Jean, a lesbian, comes to visit after her longtime partner dies. Rose and Jean have a lot in common and they strike up a fast friendship, but Jean starts falling in love with Rose, who is unaware of her new friend's sexuality.
  - "Scared Straight" (Season 4, Episode 9, aired December 10, 1988) – When Blanche's newly divorced brother Clayton comes to town he confides to Rose that he is gay; scared to tell Blanche the truth, he pretends to have slept with Rose. With Blanche furious at her roommate, Clayton is eventually forced to reveal the truth, sending Blanche into angry and confused denial.
  - "Sick and Tired" (Season 5, Episodes 1 & 2, aired September 23, 1989 & September 30, 1989) – Dorothy suffers from a mysterious illness and goes to a doctor, but he dismisses her concerns and symptoms, saying that nothing's wrong with her. She goes to another specialist, who diagnoses her with chronic fatigue syndrome. After encountering him in a restaurant, Dorothy confronts the doctor that dismissed her, advising him to listen to his patients, as he will one day be in their situation.
  - "Not Another Monday" (Season 5, Episode 7, aired November 11, 1989) – A friend tells Sophia she intends to commit suicide and wants Sophia to be there when it happens.
  - "72 Hours" (Season 5, Episode 19, aired February 17, 1990) – Rose finds she may have been exposed to HIV, after having undergone a blood transfusion following gallbladder surgery.
  - "Sister of the Bride" (Season 6, Episode 14, aired January 12, 1991) – Blanche's gay brother Clayton visits to announce his engagement to marry a man and asks for Blanche's blessing; Blanche is again conflicted about her brother's sexuality.
- Maude (1972–1978)
  - "Maude's Dilemma" (Season 1, Episodes 9 and 10, aired November 14 and 21, 1972) – Maude, who is 47 years old and a grandmother, learns she's pregnant and contemplates having an abortion. In the second half of the two-part episode, she follows through with the procedure.
- Mr. Belvedere (1985–1990)
  - "Wesley's Friend" (Season 2, Episode 16, aired January 31, 1986) – Wesley, due to misconceptions about HIV/AIDS, avoids his friend and classmate, Danny, who contracted the disease as the result of a blood transfusion.
  - "The Counselor" (Season 4, Episode 20, aired May 6, 1988) – A male camp counselor touches Wesley inappropriately, encouraging him to keep it a "secret". Wesley calls him out in order to protect a fellow camper.
- Punky Brewster (1984–1988)
  - "Cherie Lifesaver" (Season 2, Episode 16, aired January 19, 1986) – Henry Warnimont buys a new refrigerator, stashing his old one in the backyard. The kids have been learning CPR, but Allen hasn't been paying attention. When Cherie hides in the fridge during a game of hide and seek and suffocates, he cannot help, so Punky and Margaux must save Cherie's life.
- Roseanne (1988–1997, 2018)
  - "Crime And Punishment" (Season 5, Episode 13, aired January 5, 1993) – Roseanne learns her sister, Jackie, is being physically abused by her boyfriend, Fisher, prompting her husband, Dan, to assault Fisher.
  - "White Men Can't Kiss" (Season 7, Episode 9, aired November 16, 1994) – D.J. refuses to kiss a girl in his school play because she's black, leading both Roseanne and Dan to question their own bigotry.
- Saved by the Bell (1989–1992)
  - "Jessie's Song" (Season 2, Episode 9, aired November 3, 1990) – Jessie, struggling to find the time and energy to rehearse for her friends' music video and study for school, begins to rely on caffeine pills to function, a form of substance abuse. The episode was originally written with Jessie becoming addicted to speed, but this was scrapped due to standards and practices.
- WKRP in Cincinnati (1978–1982)
  - "In Concert" (Season 2, Episode 19, aired February 11, 1980) – The staff at the fictional station reacts to the real-life fatal trampling incident at a concert by The Who at Cincinnati's Riverfront Coliseum. The episode was used to advocate for bans on festival seating at concerts.

== See also ==
- After-school special
- Jumping the shark
- Oscar bait
- Problem play
- Social problem film
- Social guidance film
- Kitsch
- Message picture
