= Jesse White (actor) =

American actor (1917–1997)

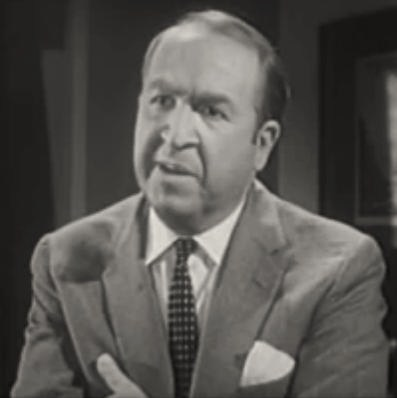
- White in Three Blondes in His Life (1961)
- Born: Jesse Marc Weidenfeld; January 3, 1917; Buffalo, New York, U.S.
- Died: January 9, 1997 (aged 80); Los Angeles, California, U.S.
- Resting place: Mount Sinai Memorial Park Cemetery
- Occupation: Actor
- Years active: 1932–1997
- Spouse: Celia Cohn (m. 1942)
- Children: 2, including Carole Ita White

Jesse White (born Jesse Marc Weidenfeld; January 3, 1917 – January 9, 1997) was an American actor who was best known for his portrayal as "Ol' Lonely" the repairman in Maytag television commercials from 1967 to 1988.

== Life and career ==
White was born in Buffalo, New York, to Jewish parents, and was raised in Akron, Ohio. He made his first amateur appearance in local stage productions at the age of 14. Though aspiring to be an actor, he worked at many different jobs during the 1930s, including selling beauty supplies and lingerie. After moving to Cleveland, Ohio, White began a career in vaudeville and burlesque, traveling widely before landing a role on Broadway. In 1942, White made his Broadway debut in The Moon Is Down, followed by a successful performance in the role of a sanitarium orderly in the popular play Harvey. He later reprised his role in the 1950 film version and the 1972 television movie.

In 1947, White made his film debut in a small part in Kiss of Death. During the 1950s, he began landing roles on television shows, including appearances in Danny Thomas's Make Room for Daddy and Peter Lawford's Dear Phoebe. In 1954, he landed a semi-regular role as Cagey Calhoun on Private Secretary, starring Ann Sothern. The role led to another semi-regular part as the deceitful Oscar Pudney on CBS's The Ann Sothern Show in 1960. In 1955, he played Colonel Willoughby Oglethorpe on The Lone Ranger (season 4 episode 35).

White guest-starred on Four Star Playhouse and NBC's The Bob Cummings Show. He appeared in roles in The Bad Seed (1956); Designing Woman (1957), with Lauren Bacall; CBS's Mr. Adams and Eve (1958), with Ida Lupino and Howard Duff; and Marjorie Morningstar (1958), with Natalie Wood and Gene Kelly.

On October 2, 1958, White portrayed the fast-talking, presumably dishonest, used-car salesman San Fernando Harry in the segment "The New Car" of the ABC sitcom The Real McCoys, starring Walter Brennan.

From 1958 to 1965, White made five guest appearances on Perry Mason: as murderer Luke Hickey in "The Case of the Married Moonlighter," as bartender Cecil in "The case of the Melancholy Marksman", as murder victim Burt Renshaw in "The Case of the Polka Dot Pony," as Tony Cerro in "The Case of the Gambling Lady", and as murder victim Max Armstead in "The Case of the Fatal Fortune."

In the 1960s, White appeared on Tightrope, Oh! Those Bells, The Twilight Zone, The Dick Van Dyke Show; The Donna Reed Show; The Andy Griffith Show, The Roaring 20s, Mickey, The Beverly Hillbillies, Petticoat Junction, Green Acres,The Munsters, The Addams Family, That Girl, and I Dream of Jeannie. In a memorable cameo, he played a frustrated airport tower controller in Stanley Kramer's It's a Mad, Mad, Mad, Mad World (1963). In 1966, he accepted the role of Donelli in The Reluctant Astronaut, playing a curmudgeonly janitorial supervisor. During the summer of 1967, White appeared at Denver's Elitch Theatre in a production of The Odd Couple with Henry Morgan.

White was cast in a television advertising campaign for the Maytag Corporation. White played the role of a lonely Maytag repairman, a man with nothing to do as a result of his company's dependable products. The campaign proved wildly successful, and the actor began a career as the ever-lonely Maytag repairman.

White continued appearing in both television and films during his many years as the Maytag repairman. His final film role was a small but pivotal role in the 1993 Joe Dante comedy Matinee starring John Goodman, and his last TV role was in "The Cadillac", an episode of Seinfeld in 1996. Seinfeld co-creator/star Jerry Seinfeld, who co-wrote the episode, had been a fan of White since his appearances on The Ann Sothern Show, and described having him on Seinfeld as a boyhood dream come true.

White was one of the voiceover actors for Stan Freberg Presents The United States of America: Volume One The Early Years and, 35 years later, he was featured on The Middle Years of the series. In addition to film and television work, White lent his voice to such cartoons as Jonny Quest and Garfield and Friends.

== Personal life ==
In 1942, White married Celia Cohn (July 17, 1914 – August 5, 2003). The couple had two daughters, Carole Ita White (who became an actress) and Janet Jonas.

== Death ==
On January 9, 1997, White died from a heart attack following surgery, six days after his 80th birthday. When White was alive his birth year was reported as '1918', thus in his obituaries he is listed as having died at 79. He is interred at Mount Sinai Memorial Park Cemetery in Los Angeles.

== Filmography ==
=== Film ===
- Stage Door Canteen (1943) as Jesse White (uncredited)
- Kiss of Death (1947) as Taxi Driver (uncredited)
- Gentleman's Agreement (1947) as Elevator Starter (uncredited)
- Texas, Brooklyn and Heaven (1948) as Customer (uncredited)
- Guilty Bystander (1950) as Masher
- Harvey (1950) as Marvin Wilson
- Katie Did It (1951) as Jim Dilloway
- Bedtime for Bonzo (1951) as Babcock
- Francis Goes to the Races (1951) as Frank Damer
- Callaway Went Thataway (1951) as Georgie Markham
- Death of a Salesman (1951) as Stanley
- The Girl in White (1952) as Alec, Ambulance Driver
- Million Dollar Mermaid (1952) as Doc Cronnol
- Gunsmoke, aka Roughshod, A Man's Country (1953) as Professor
- Champ for a Day (1953) as Willie Foltis
- Forever Female (1953) as Willie Wolfe
- Witness to Murder (1954) as Tubby Otis
- Hell's Half Acre (1954) as Eddie Vincent
- Not as a Stranger (1955) as Ben Cosgrove
- The Girl Rush (1955) as Ludwig – Pit Boss
- The Come On (1956) as J.J. McGonigle
- He Laughed Last (1956) as Max Lassiter
- Back from Eternity (1956) as Pete Boswick
- The Bad Seed (1956) as Emory Wages
- Designing Woman (1957) as Charlie Arneg
- God Is My Partner (1957) as Louis 'The Lump' Lumpkin
- Johnny Trouble (1957) as Parsons
- Country Music Holiday (1958) as Sonny Moon
- Marjorie Morningstar (1958) as Lou Michaelson
- The Rise and Fall of Legs Diamond (1960) as Leo "Butcher" Bremer
- The Big Night (1960) as Wegg
- Three Blondes in His Life (1961) as Ed Kelly
- A Fever in the Blood (1961) as Police Sgt. Michael 'Mickey' Beers
- The Right Approach (1961) as Brian Freer
- Tomboy and the Champ (1961) as Windy Skiles
- On the Double (1961) as Corporal Joseph Praeger
- Sail a Crooked Ship (1961) as McDonald
- Period of Adjustment (1962) as Christmas Caroler (uncredited)
- It's Only Money (1962) as Pete Flint
- The Yellow Canary (1963) as Ed Thornburg
- It's a Mad, Mad, Mad, Mad World (1963) as Radio tower operator at Rancho Conejo
- Looking for Love (1964) as Tiger Shay
- A House is Not a Home (1964) as Rafferty
- Pajama Party (1964) as J. Sinister Hulk
- Dear Brigitte (1965) as Cliff Argyle – the Bookie
- The Ghost in the Invisible Bikini (1966) as J. Sinister Hulk
- The Reluctant Astronaut (1967) as Donelli
- The Spirit Is Willing (1967) as Fess Dorple
- Togetherness (1970) as Henry
- Bless the Beasts and the Children (1971) as Sid Shecker
- The Brothers O'Toole (1973) as the Mayor
- Las Vegas Lady (1975) as Big Jake
- Return to Campus (1975) as Sports announcer
- Nashville Girl (1976) as C.Y. Ordell
- Won Ton Ton, the Dog Who Saved Hollywood (1976) as Rudy's Agent
- The Cat from Outer Space (1978) as Earnest Ernie
- Monster in the Closet (1986) as Ben
- Matinee (1993) as Mr. Spector

=== Television ===
- Make Room for Daddy (1 episode, 1954)
- The Loretta Young Show (1 episode, 1954)
- Dear Phoebe (1 episode, 1954) as Murray Kragon
- Treasury Men in Action (1 episode, 1955) as Ronald Terni
- Lux Video Theatre (1 episode, 1955) as Sigmund
- The Lone Ranger (1 episode, 1955) as Col. Willoughby J. Oglethorpe
- Jane Wyman Presents The Fireside Theatre (1 episode, 1955) as Al
- TV Reader's Digest (1 episode, 1955)
- Four Star Playhouse (1 episode, 1955) as Mr. Simpson
- Damon Runyon Theater (1 episode, 1955) as Chesty Charlie
- Cavalcade of America (1 episode, 1956)
- Private Secretary (5 episodes, 1954–1956) as Mickey Calhoun / 'Cagey' Calhoun / Mickey 'Cagey' Calhoun
- Climax! (1 episode, 1957) as Philly
- The 20th Century Fox Hour (4 episodes, 1956–57) as Doberman / George / George Kirby / Eddie Hoke
- Circus Boy (1 episode, 1957) as Spike Marlin
- Mr. Adams and Eve (1 episode, 1958) as Director
- The Bob Cummings Show (1 episode, 1958) as H.R. Hap Henderson
- The Real McCoys (1 episode, 1958) as San Fernando Harry
- Westinghouse Desilu Playhouse (2 episodes, 1958) as Bartender / Barney Snyder
- The Thin Man (1 episode, 1959) as Nitro Noonan
- The Donna Reed Show (1 episode, 1959) as Vance
- The Texan (1 episode, 1959) as Sheriff Weeb Martin
- Lux Playhouse (1 episode, 1959) as Detective Drake
- Richard Diamond, Private Detective (1 episode, 1959) as Walt Conlin
- The David Niven Show (1 episode, 1959) as Paul Reisner
- Alcoa Theatre (1 episode, 1959) as John Burke
- Tightrope (2 episodes, 1959–60) as Pete Granger / Mike Davis
- Man with a Camera (1960) as Frankie Billings
- The Best of the Post (1 episode, 1961) as Benny
- The Andy Griffith Show (1 episode, 1961) as Fred Boone
- Westinghouse Playhouse (2 episodes, 1961) as Fred Sanford
- The Ann Sothern Show (6 episodes, 1960–61) as Oscar Pudney / Simpson
- Angel (1 episode, in "Promise to a Friend", 1961) as Max
- The Dick Van Dyke Show (1 episode, 1961) as Bill
- General Electric Theater (3 episodes, 1954–61) as Mike / Joe Maskowitz
- The Roaring 20s (1 episode, 1961) as Boots
- 77 Sunset Strip (1 episode, 1961) as Marvin Heywood
- Calvin and the Colonel (1 episode, 1961) as Sgt. Thomas (voice)
- The Twilight Zone (2 episodes, 1961–1962) as Harmon Cavender / Repair Man
- Ichabod and Me (2 episodes, 1962) as Lippy Bourke
- King of Diamonds (1 episode, 1962) as Sig Norge
- Pete and Gladys (1 episode, 1962) as Martin
- Adventures in Paradise (1 episode, 1962) as Frank Crayle
- Cain's Hundred (1 episode, 1962) as Rudy
- Oh! Those Bells (1 episode, 1962) as Ankles
- Naked City (1 episode, 1962) as Harold Slate
- I'm Dickens, He's Fenster (1 episode, 1963) as Hershey
- Bob Hope Presents the Chrysler Theatre (1 episode, 1963) as Marvin
- The Jack Benny Program (4 episodes, 1957–64) as Steve Burke / Talent Agent Weber / Mr. Weber
- Ben Casey (1 episode, 1964) as Mr. Barringer
- Bonanza (Episode: "The Saga of Muley Jones", 1964) as Eskey
- Linus the Lionhearted (2 episodes, 1964) as Claudius Crow (voice)
- Jonny Quest (1 episode, 1964) as Pasha Peddler (voice)
- Mickey (1 episode, 1964) as Sid
- The Addams Family (1 episode, 1964) as Sgt. Haley
- Kraft Suspense Theatre (1 episode, 1965) as Emil Glueck
- The Munsters (1 episode, 1965) as J. R. Finlater
- Perry Mason (5 episodes, 1958–65) as Max Armstead / Tony Cerro / Burt Renshaw / Cecil / Luke Hickey
- The Wild Wild West (1 episode, 1966) as Governor Lewis
- Please Don't Eat the Daisies (1 episode, 1966)
- The Tammy Grimes Show (1 episode, 1966) as Gus
- Green Acres (2 episodes, 1965–67) as Charlie / George Wilkins
- Gomer Pyle, U.S.M.C. (1 episode, 1967–1968) as Harry Krasna / The Owner
- The Beverly Hillbillies (2 episodes, 1963–67) as Mr. Mortimer / H.H.H. Jones
- Rango (1 episode, 1967) as Gus
- I Dream of Jeannie (1 episode, 1967) as Sam
- Accidental Family (1 episode, 1967) as Mr. Fenton
- Hawaii Five-O (1 episode, 1968–69) as Nat Keller
- That Girl (5 episodes, 1969) as Eddy Edwards / Hal Grissom / Phil Bender / Clinton Hayworth
- The Jackie Gleason Show (2 episodes, 1967–69) as 'Swifty' Jenkins / Bob Cosgrove
- Land of the Giants (1 episode, 1969) as Max Manfred
- The Debbie Reynolds Show (1 episode, 1970) as Mayor Keiselbach
- Dad, Can I Borrow the Car? (1970)
- Mannix (1 episode, 1971) as Sam Westlake
- Love, American Style (2 episodes, 1969–71) as Bailiff (segment "Love and the Jury") / Pun Jab (segment "Love and the Divorce Sale")
- The Wonderful World of Disney (1 episode, 1972)
- Here's Lucy (1 episode, 1972) as Hickey
- Of Thee I Sing (1972) as Matthew Fulton
- "Harvey" (Hallmark Hall of Fame, re-enacting his role in the 1950 film, 1972), as Marvin Wilson
- These Are the Days (unknown episodes, 1974–75) (voice)
- Devlin (unknown episodes, 1974) (voice)
- Kolchak: The Night Stalker (1 episode, 1975) as Security Guard
- Happy Days (1 episode, 1975) as Bander
- New Zoo Revue (2 episodes, 1975) as Professor Gordon / Mr. Bigwig
- Quincy, M.E. (1 episode, 1977) as Mechanic
- ABC Weekend Special (1 episode, 1977) as Mr. Gabby
- Alien Worlds (1 episode, 1979) (voice)
- The Love Boat (1 episode, 1981) as Harry
- Hart to Hart (1 episode, 1982) as Ernie
- Pandamonium (1982–83) as Chesty (voice)
- Trapper John, M.D. (1 episode, 1983) as Mac Mulligan
- Inspector Gadget (pilot episode, 1982, unreleased version) as Inspector Gadget (voice)
- Small Wonder (1 episode, 1987)
- The New Gidget (1 episode, 1987) as Washing Machine Repairman
- Garfield and Friends (1 episode, 1989) as Howie (voice)
- MacGyver (1 episode, 1990) as Mel
- Seinfeld (1 episode, 1996) as Ralph (final appearance)

=== Commercials ===
- Maytag (1967–1988) as Ol' Lonely the repairman

== Theatre ==
- Sons and Soldiers (1943) as The Salesman
- My Dear Public (1943) as Gus Wagner
- Mrs. Kimball Presents (1944) as J. G. McGuire
- Helen Goes To Troy (1944) as Ajax 1st
- Harvey (1943) as Duane Wilson
- Born Yesterday (1946) as Harry Brock
- The Cradle Will Rock (1947) as Dick
- Red Gloves (1948) as Marochek
- Kelly (1965) as Stickpin Sidney Crane
- The Front Page (1969) as The Mayor
- Harvey (1970) as Duane Wilson

Preceded by none	Maytag Repairman; 1967–1988	Succeeded by Gordon Jump
