= Colin Ferguson =

Canadian actor, director and producer

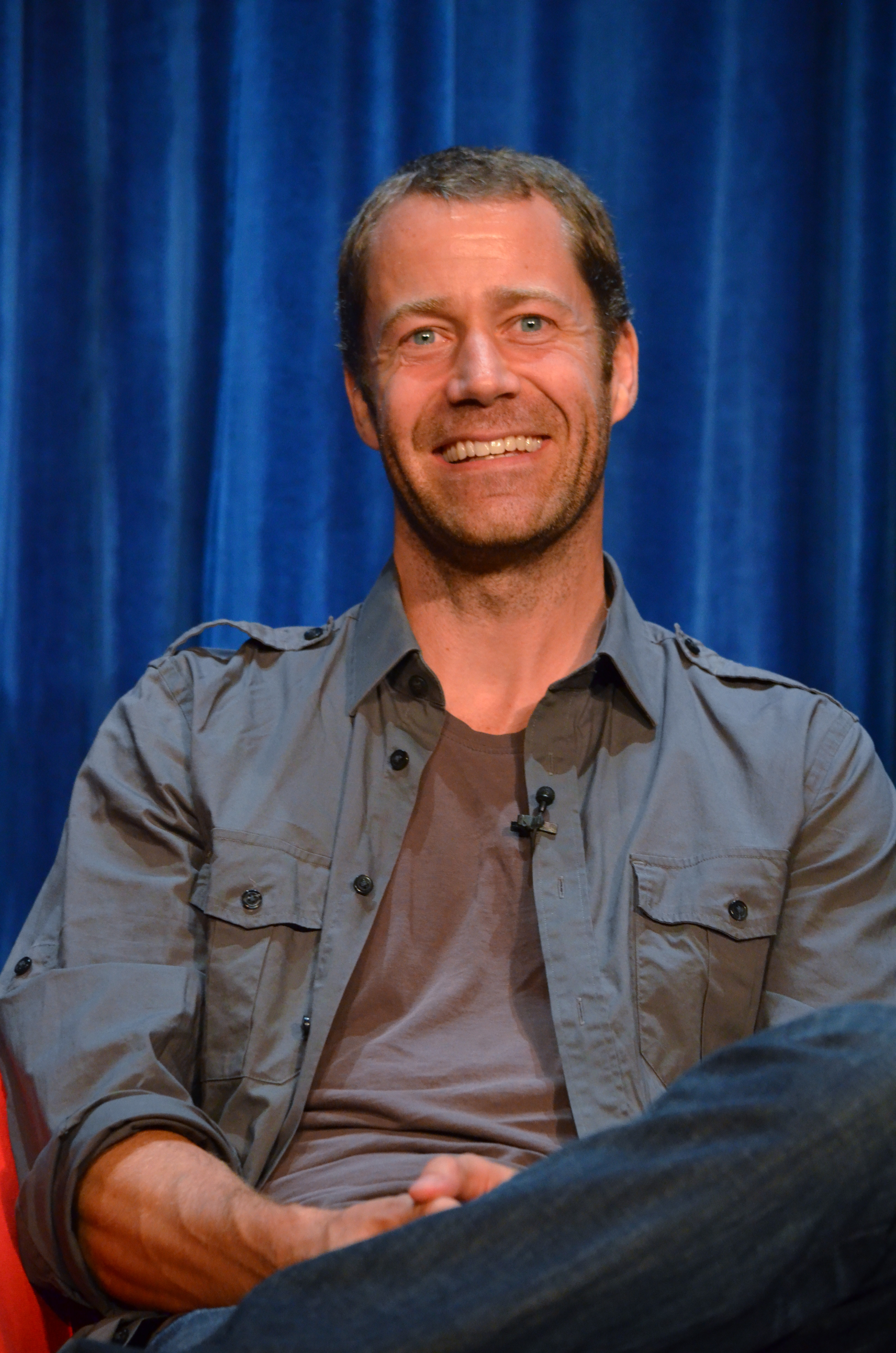
- Born: Montreal, Quebec, Canada
- Occupations: Actor, director, producer
- Years active: 1995–present
- Partner: Lindsay Thompson
- Children: 1

Colin Ferguson is a Canadian actor, director and producer. He is known for playing Sheriff Jack Carter on the Syfy series Eureka, the Maytag Man, and Lewis on Then Came You.

== Early life ==
Ferguson was born and raised in Montreal, Quebec, and is a graduate of Appleby College and McGill University. Since he was born and raised around Montreal, which predominantly speaks French, he is bilingual speaking both French and English. He was born in Canada and became a naturalized citizen of the United States.

== Career ==
Ferguson was a member of the Montreal improv group On the Spot. He has been cast in many television series, television films, and films. In 2003, he starred in the short-lived TV show Coupling. He was the lead in Eureka, a Syfy original series broadcast between 2006 and 2012, for which he was also a producer in its later seasons. He was also a guest presenter for sci-fi news show HypaSpace.

He played the role of Burke Andrew in the 1993 TV mini series More Tales of the City, based on Armistead Maupin's series of novels.

In 2007, he starred as Dan Casey in the Lifetime Christmas film Christmas in Paradise alongside Charlotte Ross. In 2010, Ferguson starred as Nathan Bickerman in the Syfy original film Lake Placid 3 co-starring Kirsty Mitchell. On September 5, 2011, he appeared on the podcast Disasterpiece Theatre to discuss what Eureka might have looked like if it had been directed by Michael Bay.

He starred in The Vampire Diaries and had a recurring role in TV series Haven in 2013 and 2014. In January 2014, Ferguson became the latest "Maytag Repairman" in the multimedia ad campaign for Maytag appliances. In July 2015, Ferguson began playing a recurring role in season three of the Hallmark Channel series Cedar Cove, as the new district attorney and a rival to Jack.

In 2016, he starred as Jack Brewster in the Hallmark original film Every Christmas Has a Story alongside Lori Loughlin. In 2017, he starred as Mackintyre Sullivan in the Fixer Upper Mysteries alongside Jewel Kilcher.

== Personal life ==
Ferguson has one son, born in 2013, whom he raises with partner Lindsay Thompson.

He is a Montreal Canadiens fan, and he contributes to NHL.com as a celebrity blogger.

== Filmography ==
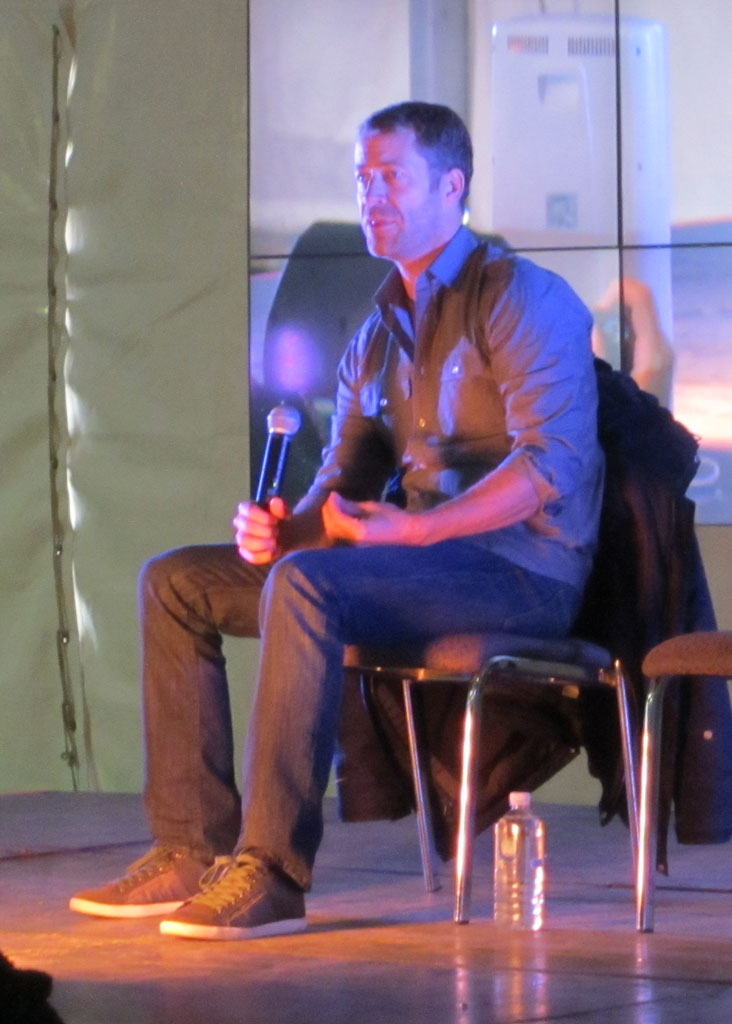
Ferguson at Oz Comic-Con in 2013

=== Film ===
Year	Title	Role
1996	Rowing Through	Tiff Wood
1998	The Opposite of Sex	Tom De Lury
2000	Daydream Believers: The Monkees' Story	Van Foreman
2001	The Surprise Party	Oscar
2005	Confessions of a Sociopathic Social Climber	Charles Fitz
2005	Guy in Row Five	Dean
2005	Mom at Sixteen	Bob Cooper
2006	Playing House	Michael Tate
2007	Because I Said So	Derek Decker
2010	Lake Placid 3	Nathan Bickerman
2011	Life's a Beach	Pierre
2018	Breaking & Exiting	Officer Davis

=== Television ===
Year	Title	Role	Notes
1995	Are You Afraid of the Dark?	Tommy	Episode: "The Tale of C7"
1997	The Hunger	Peter Garson	Episode: "Bridal Suite"
1997	A Prayer in the Dark	Jimmy Flood	Television film
1997	Night Sins	Todd	Television film
1998	More Tales of the City	Burke Andrew	Television miniseries
1998	The X-Files	Unnamed US Marshal (Background 6:48)	Episode: "Kitsunegari"
1999	Cover Me	Andrew Chase	Television miniseries
2000	Then Came You	Lewis	Recurring role
2001	Daydream Believers: The Monkees' Story	Van Foreman	Television film
2001	Inside the Osmonds	Mike Curb	Television film
2001	Titus	Dr. Bennet	Episode: "The Pendulum"
2001	Dead Last	Prince Torben of Mulravia	Episode: "The Mulravian Candidate"
2001	Becker	Clark	Episode: "Breakfast of Chumpions"
2001	Jennifer	Peter	Television film
2001	Malcolm in the Middle	Deputy Brock	Episode: "Malcolm's Girlfriend"
2002	We Were the Mulvaneys	Dr. Witt	Television film
2002	The Outer Limits	David	Episode: "Free Spirit"
2003	Imagine	Himself	Episode: "Imagine"
2003	Crossing Jordan	Brad Ferris	Episode: "Crossing Jordan"
2003	Coupling	Patrick Maitland	Main role
2004	Americana	David	Television film
2004	Career Suicide	Rod	Television film
2004	Line of Fire	David Gwynn	4 episodes
2005	Ladies Night	Jesse Grant	Television film
2005	Vinegar Hill	Tom Welton	Television film
2005	Confessions of a Sociopathic Social Climber	Charles Fitz	Television film
2005	Girlfriends	Eric Stone	Episode: "Trial and Errors"
2006	Teachers	Doug Diamond	Episode: "Testing"
2006	My Boys	Steve	Episode: "Take One for the Team"
2006	The House Next Door	Walker	Television film
2006–2012	Eureka	Sheriff Jack Carter	Main role
2006	Eureka: Hide and Seek	Sheriff Jack Carter	Main role
2006–2007	HypaSpace	Himself	Guest presenter; 2 episodes
2007	CSI: Miami	Dominic Whitford / Greg Ramsey	Episode: "Triple Threat"
2007	Christmas in Paradise	Dan Casey	Television film
2008	Eureka: Happenings Around Town	Sheriff Jack Carter	Television film
2008	Stan Maynard's Best Day Ever	The Doctor	Television film
2008	Fear Itself	Dennis Mahoney	Episode: "Family Man"
2008	Ghost Hunters	Himself	Episode: "USS Hornet"
2009	FedCon XVIII: The Golden Future	Himself	Television film
2010	Hollywood Treasure	Himself	Episode: "Chasing Rudolph"
2011	The Guild	Himself	Episode: "Social Traumas"
2011	Matty Hanson and the Invisibility Ray	Cutter Hanson	Television film
2012	Like Father	Van Lyons	Television film
2012	Tabletop	Himself	Episode: "Ticket to Ride"
2012	Primeval: New World	Howard Canin	Episode: "Breakthrough"
2013	Happily Divorced	Chris	Episode: "Peter's Boyfriend"
2013–2015	Haven	William	Recurring role (seasons 4–5)
2014	The Vampire Diaries	Thomas Vincent 'Tripp' Cooke	Recurring role (season 6)
2014	Major Crimes	Agent Howard's doctor	Episode: "Zoo Story"
2015	Cedar Cove	District attorney Paul Watson	Recurring role
2016	Every Christmas Has a Story	Jack Brewster	Television film
2017	Framed for Murder: A Fixer Upper Mystery	Macintyre Sullivan	Television film
2017	Concrete Evidence: A Fixer Upper Mystery	Macintyre Sullivan	Television film
2017	Deadly Deed: A Fixer Upper Mystery	Macintyre Sullivan	Television film
2017	Sea Change	TJ's Dad	Television film
2017	You're The Worst	Boone	Recurring role (season 4)
2018	Christmas on Honeysuckle Lane	Morgan	Television film
2019	Christmas in Montana	Travis	Television film
2022–2025	The Summer I Turned Pretty	John Conklin	Series regular
2024–2025	Landman	Bob Knowles	Recurring role (seasons 1–2)

=== As a director or producer ===
Year	Production	Role	Notes
2009–2010	Eureka	Director	Episodes: "Your Face or Mine?", "The Story of O2"
2010	Triassic Attack	Director	Television film
2011–2012	Eureka	Producer	11 episodes (seasons 4–5)
2015	Haven	Director	Episode: "Just Passing Through"

== Notes ==
Preceded by Clay Earl Jackson	Maytag Repairman; 2014–present	Succeeded by incumbent
