= Hollywood Treasure =

American reality television series

- Genre: Documentary; Reality
- Directed by: Hans van Riet
- Starring: Joe Maddalena
- Country of origin: United States
- Original language: English
- No. of seasons: 2
- No. of episodes: 30

Production
- Executive producers: Mark Zupon; Scott Gurney; Deirdre Gurney
- Producer: Joe Maddelana
- Running time: Season 1 – 30 minutes Season 2 – 60 minutes
- Production companies: Gurney Productions, Zupon Entertainment, LLC

Original release
- Network: Syfy
- Release: October 27, 2010 – June 26, 2012

Hollywood Treasure is an American reality television series that began airing on SyFy, October 27, 2010, which follows a Hollywood, California-based appraiser named Joe Maddalena and his team as they track down, appraise and help auction off valuable film, television, and pop culture memorabilia.

== Opening ==
My name is Joe Maddalena. I hunt for iconic treasures from the movies and TV shows you loved, and auction them for prices you wouldn't believe. Together with my team of talented investigators, I would scour the globe to uncover Hollywood treasure.

== Cast ==
- Joe Maddalena – "Treasure Hunter", Host/Owner of Profiles In History
- Brian Chanes – Head of Acquisitions/Consignment Relations
- Jon Mankuta – Special Projects Manager
- Tracey McCall – Client Relations/Special Events Coordinator
- Jesse D'Angelo – Prop Maker/Specialist
- Cherry Davis – Receptionist
- Stacey Roman – Auctioneer

== Critical reception ==
David Hinckley of the New York Daily News wrote "Hollywood Treasure will intrigue film junkies and memorabilia collectors. For the rest of us, it's breezy amusement about a world that, like the movies themselves, we will always be watching from the audience".

Brian Lowry of Variety wrote that "we've seen this movie (or rather, reality-TV show) before, dozens of times, in more glamorous settings. And having each half-hour (two will air back to back) conclude with an auction doesn't really foster much suspense".

Patty Miranda of Shakefire.com wrote "For those who wish there was a Hollywood-themed version of American Pickers, Hollywood Treasure scratches that itch as it returns for a second season".

== Episodes ==
=== Season one (2010–11) ===
No. overall	No. in season	Title	Original release date
1	101	"Let the Bidding Begin"	October 27, 2010
Joe tries to recover one of the mechanical sharks used in a Jaws movie that was on display at a junkyard. Later, a Chicago family offers to auction the original carpet bag prop used in the 1964 Mary Poppins film.
2	102	"I'll Get You, My Pretty"	October 27, 2010
As time runs out for an auction deadline, Joe rushes to authenticate a suit jacket worn by Béla Lugosi in the 1932 horror film White Zombie. Other last minute items include a model spaceship from Starship Troopers and the Wicked Witch's hat from The Wizard of Oz.
3	103	"Comic Con-quest"	November 3, 2010
Joe descends upon the San Diego ComicCon, the world's largest comic book convention, to negotiate the sale of a puppet from Corpse Bride and original artwork by Jack Kirby and Stan Lee. He also meets Erin Gray, the actress who played Wilma Deering in Buck Rogers, who offers up an original model of a starfighter used in the show.
4	104	"Joe Goes Ape"	November 3, 2010
Joe meets a New York City collector of classic movie posters and he believes his 1931 Frankenstein poster could fetch a million dollars, but does not convince the owner to part with it. He also meets a film historian who has leads to original King Kong memorabilia.
5	105	"London Calling"	November 10, 2010
Joe heads to England to see the car used in the film Chitty Chitty Bang Bang. Later, Joe meets former child star Harvey Spencer Stephens, who played Damien in The Omen (1976) to appraise a tricycle used in the film. Stephens has second thoughts with selling the tricycle and instead, parts with a costume from the film.
6	106	"Joe Gets Animated"	November 10, 2010
Joe appraises animation cels by the late Walter Lantz, the creator of Woody Woodpecker, and later he seeks pieces of the yellow brick road used in The Wizard of Oz film for an upcoming auction to benefit a sick friend. Distraught over delays in acquiring the road, Tracey tracks down a KITT Shelby Mustang used in the 2008 Knight Rider television series.
7	107	"Joe's Golden Opportunity"	November 17, 2010
As Joe brings the Space Pod from Lost in Space to a New Jersey collector, he learns the whereabouts of the Lion's Badge of Courage prop from The Wizard of Oz. Later in England, Joe acquires a Golden Ticket from the 1971 film Willy Wonka & the Chocolate Factory from Julie Dawn Cole, the actress who played Veruca Salt. Other items include a license plate from the Jeep used in Jurassic Park and original Batman artwork by Bob Kane.
8	108	"The Munster Hunt"	November 17, 2010
Joe holds an "appraisal clinic" at the Hollywood & Highland Center and later he fetches original Eyvind Earle concept art from Disney's Sleeping Beauty. Meanwhile Tracey tracks down costumes worn by Butch Patrick, who played Eddie Munster in The Munsters and Jon scores an original Action Comics 1 and Green Hornet comic books for an upcoming auction.
9	109	"In Full Effects"	December 1, 2010
Joe acquires consignments from the Stan Winston School of Character Arts for a children's charity auction sponsored by Variety magazine. Among them a bust of Iron Man signed by Stan Lee, raptor puppet heads from Jurassic Park 2 and 3, and a mangled cyborg arm worn by Arnold Schwarzenegger in Terminator 2, but the big seller at the auction is an identity disc prop from Tron: Legacy.
10	110	"Joe's Judgement Day"	December 1, 2010
With an auction deadline approaching, Joe loses out on obtaining the original Lawgiver statue from 1968's Planet of the Apes, and a wax statue of Jerry Lewis from 1963's The Nutty Professor, but lands obscure items from the collection of the late Forrest J Ackerman, who coined the term "science fiction". Later, actor Christopher Judge, who played Teal'c in Stargate SG-1, offers up dozens of original props used in the series.
11	111	"Chasing Rudolph"	December 8, 2010
With a Christmas KaBOOM! charity auction coming up, Joe tries, without success, to get a collector to part with a Rudolf and Santa puppet from the classic 1964 TV special. Movie prop archivist & collector, Jim Manning consigns his "Daffy" gremlin puppet from Gremlins 2: The New Batch and later, Eddie McClintock from Warehouse 13 contributes his signature Tesla Gun sidearm from the series, and Colin Ferguson from Eureka offers his character's complete sheriff uniform.
12	112	"Justice For Dorothy"	December 8, 2010
Joe sets up an auction for the Michael J. Fox charity Team Fox and meets with screenwriter Bob Gale, the creator of the Back to the Future trilogy, to get original memorabilia from the films which includes the Grays Sports Almanac, the power-lace Nike shoes and resizing jacket from Back to the Future Part II, and a custom-built replica of the time-traveling DeLorean used in all three films. Joe also treks to the Judy Garland Museum in Grand Rapids, Minnesota on an investigation for one pair of the iconic ruby slippers, which were stolen in 2005.
13	113	"Packrats, Robots and Oz"	June 1, 2011
Joe comes to the aid of prop maker Lauren Vogt who needs money to save her home and is considering selling her items kept in a storage shed, such as models from James and the Giant Peach and The Nightmare Before Christmas and masks from Enemy Mine. Joe gets a call about a copy of The Wizard of Oz signed by every cast member of the 1939 movie, including Toto. Later, he visits Golden Era science-fiction collector Bill Malone, who will not sell his Robby the Robot from Forbidden Planet, but parts with a ray gun from the film instead.
14	114	"Endoskeletons in the Closet"	June 1, 2011
Joe is contacted by Eric Lidoff, the son-in-law of legendary FX artist Stan Winston, to help auction off some family heirlooms to fund a character school in Stan's name. The prize of the collection is a full endoskeleton from Terminator 2. Later Joe checks out a plane on the roof of a restaurant that was allegedly used in the James Bond film, Octopussy, but he finds too many inconsistencies between the plane and production photos from the movie. The last items he looks at are original RKO Pictures title cards.
15	115	"Trek to the Future"	June 8, 2011
Joe helps Desi Dos Santos, a Back to the Future fan, acquire a Back to the Future Part II hoverboard, but to get the money, Desi must auction something from his collection. Joe appraises his Back to the Future Part III DeLorean at a million dollars, but Desi parts with a Spider-Man Green Goblin mask instead. Later, Joe inspects a Disneyland Haunted Mansion original painting by Elmer Plummer and finds "The Lost Enterprise" which would have been used in the canceled Star Trek Phase II TV series, but the owner does not want to sell.
16	116	"Monsters and Miracles"	June 8, 2011
Joe's mother Betty shows him an article about a Christmas movie-themed museum in Hinckley, Ohio that is closing down and considering selling some of their items. Joe and Tracey visit museum owners Mark and Dana Klaus (aka Santa and Mrs. Claus). After some hesitation, they finally let Joe auction off their Miracle on 34th Street Santa's Sleigh and Reindeer model. Later, other items inspected by Joe and team are a full-body monster from Jeepers Creepers II, a collection of checks signed by Frank Sinatra, Orson Welles and Alfred Hitchcock.
17	117	"Demons and Spacesuits and Slippers, Oh My"	June 15, 2011
Joe and Tracey visit actress Debbie Reynolds at her ranch in Creston, California to take stock of her private collection of movie props and costumes, including the original Arabian-style Wizard of Oz "ruby slippers" designed by Gilbert Adrian, Marilyn Monroe's dress from The Seven Year Itch, and The Ark of the Covenant prop from either The Ten Commandments or Ben Hur. Brian tries to authenticate a space suit chest pack from 2001: A Space Odyssey as well as a photo archive of the cast and crew. Jon takes a trip to "Meltdown", a comic book shop and discovers a Hellboy "Sammael" creature hiding in the back.
18	118	"The One That Got Away"	June 15, 2011
Joe visits "Abacus Costumes and Props" in Chatsworth, California and finds a Ghostbusters Gozer costume, a "Shuttle Pod 1" and a photon torpedo models from Star Trek: Enterprise. Later, Joe travels to Philadelphia, Pennsylvania to possibly buy a dream item for his personal collection, an "Enik" character from Land of the Lost. Later, Joe visits "Poster Mountain" in Northridge, California to authenticate an original H.G. Wells' The Invisible Man movie poster.
19	119	"Blood, Sweater & Terminators"	June 22, 2011
Joe issues a challenge to his team: whoever brings in the best consignments wins a free trip to Hawaii. Tracey heads to "Roxy Deluxe" costumes in North Hollywood, California and lands what she believes is Jeff Bridges' "The Dude" sweater from The Big Lebowski (though Joe shows her it is not), Jesse finds an Arnold Schwarzenegger latex puppet head from Terminator 2 and a Beneath the Planet of the Apes "Bleeding Lawgiver" statue. Jon appraises two Sheena, Queen of the Jungle costumes, and Joe lands Clark Gable's World War II United States Army Air Corps jacket from 1943 when he enlisted.
20	120	"Holy Gobstopper, Batman!"	June 22, 2011
In Raleigh, North Carolina, Joe, Jon and Tracy check out Wesley Cannon's "man-cave" of collectibles, which features a "body tree" from 300, a goblin sword from Labyrinth and characters from The Dark Crystal. Back in L.A., after appraising a "gobstopper" prop, Tracy visits Mel Stuart, director of the original Charlie and the Chocolate Factory, who consigns his "Wonka Bar" and a hand-annotated script with the original ending. Later, actor Burt Ward stops by "Profiles Loft" to authenticate Robin's Batcycle, used in the Batman TV series.
21	121	"Lost in Apes"	June 29, 2011
Joe travels to New Jersey to help collector John Azarian hunt down wanted items to add to his prized Lost in Space collection. Tracey finds a rare spaceman suit and helmet from the show which fetches $20K. Joe also auctions off Walter Lantz originals and Mel Blanc possessions to help raise money for animation collector Paul Mayer who needs heart surgery. The items include a Woody Woodpecker costume and animation cels, an Oswald the Rabbit cel, and a Bewitched autograph production still signed by actor Dick York. Jon gets a King Kong animatronic mask he believes is from King Kong Lives, however its actually from the 1976 King Kong making it more valuable. Jesse authenticates an unknown flying saucer model which turns out to have been used in The Dick Van Dyke Show.
22	122	"Chitty Chitty Bid Bid"	June 29, 2011
Joe lands for the auction the original car used in the film Chitty Chitty Bang Bang and races to the studio of The Tonight Show with Jay Leno to present it to guest Dick Van Dyke who starred in the original movie. Meanwhile, Brian checks out some creature costumes and manages to get a Predator 2 costume for the auction. Chitty fails to attract a bid at the starting price of $950,000, but later sells privately for $800,000, not the million Joe estimated for owner Pierre Picton. Another big ticket item exceeds expectations; $210,000 is paid for a hand-written letter from Walt Disney to Ub Iwerks, the man behind Mickey Mouse, offering him a job.
23	123	"The Zombie and the Rocketeer"	July 6, 2011
Wanting to help those who suffered in the earthquake and tsunami in Japan, producer-director Frank Darabont has Joe pick through his movie props collection where he finds prison badges, rock hammers, and the soapstone and alabaster chess set from The Shawshank Redemption along with the "Sparky" electric chair used in The Green Mile. Special effects artist, Greg Nicotero donates his foam latex zombie masks used in The Walking Dead. Meanwhile, Brian and Jesse attend the Monsterpalooza horror movie convention hoping to land some classic horror film consignments. Instead they find a stuntman's helmet used in The Rocketeer which fetches $10K at auction, while the disaster relief items benefit $99,000.
24	124	"A Borg in the Basement"	July 6, 2011
Joe gets a call from Rene Reyes at the Paley Center for Media to appraise costumes and character heads used by make-up artists. He finds several costumes from Star Trek: Deep Space Nine and a "Borg" and "Data" costume from Star Trek: The Next Generation. Meanwhile Tracey tries to find Joe a birthday present for his 50th birthday party which is a difficult challenge for a man who buys and sells movie memorabilia, but she manages to find a Twiki costume from Buck Rogers. Actor Felix Silla, who played the robot in the series, also pays a visit. Later Joe gets a Nautilus submarine miniature from Captain Nemo and the Underwater City, to auction.

=== Season two (2012) ===
No. overall	No. in season	Title	Original release date
25	201	"Riddler Rudy and the Ruby Slippers"	May 22, 2012
Joe finds a pair of Dorothy's ruby slippers from The Wizard of Oz, but the seller won't accept anything less than two million dollars. Joe's longtime associates Chad and Doug Dreier put their collection up for sale which includes Christopher Reeve and Marlon Brando's outfits from Superman. Finally, Sean Astin stops by to show Joe his own movie collection from his career, such as Rudy, The Goonies, and The Lord of the Rings.
26	202	"Chamber of Secrets"	May 29, 2012
Joe auctions off the 35mm PSR-153 Panavision camera that filmed Star Wars Episode IV: A New Hope that he got from Todd Fisher's collection. After asking a guaranteed $100,000 for the camera, Todd sweetens the deal with a Marilyn Monroe Bus Stop dress. Tracey takes Joe to the American Horror Story house, hoping to add it to one of their auctions. Make-up/FX artist John Chambers' collection comes up for auction including an Albina Mutant mask from Beneath the Planet of the Apes, a "Zira" Planet of the Apes bust, "The Sixth Finger" head from The Outer Limits and a make up briefcase used in the CIA's Canadian caper incident in Iran. Also, a collector comes into the showroom wanting to sell his duel stunt pistols from Lara Croft: Tomb Raider.
27	203	"Hunger for District 12"	June 5, 2012
Joe and Brian purchases the 1977 Chevy camaro "Bumblebee" from Transformers found in a Hollywood stuntman George Sack's junkyard and later drives the car to The Television Motion Picture Car Club meet. A client brings in a Yoda on-set "rehearsal puppet" from Star Wars: The Empire Strikes Back that goes for $22,500 at auction. Joe and Tracey have a chance to add "District 12", the 72-acre site filmed in Hildebran, North Carolina from The Hunger Games into their auction. They also buy a "Mockingjay" pin used in the movie. Then, a collector comes into the showroom to sell his "puzzle box" from Hellraiser which could be just a replica.
28	204	"Auctions Are Like a Box of Chocolates"	June 12, 2012
Tracey and Jon head to Blast from the Past, a local memorabilia store to check out a pair of Wonder Woman's bracelets and golden lasso from the 1975 Wonder Woman TV series. Joe travels to Granbury, Texas to meet up with music producer Chris Christian to auction off his Forrest Gump collection that features Gump's Nike sneakers, the Bubba Gump Shrimp Co. running hat and the screen used bench. Then shows Joe his 21-foot filming miniature submarine from the Hunt for Red October. Jon goes to the Hollywood Show in Burbank, California where he tracks down his "others" costume from his stint on season 6 of Lost. Brian buys an "Immortal" battle mask from 300 and a client wants to sell a lock of Marilyn Monroe's hair.
29	205	"X Marks the Prop"	June 19, 2012
Brian meets his friend at Vasquez Rocks that has been used as a filming location in the original Star Trek series to show him a screen used "Phaser One" prop. Joe then calls in George Takei to determine if the mid-grade phaser is authentic. Next, a passionate Star Wars collector brings his limited edition replica Don Post C-3PO statue into the showroom to possibly cosign it. Then Joe and Tracey meets Academy award-winning makeup artist Ve Neill at her ranch to see her Beetlejuice collection which features a modern cowhide party couch and a "Betelgeuse" coffin. Meanwhile, Joe and Jon travel to Oklahoma City to secure a Wolverine's claws and dog tags from X2: X-Men United. Also, a new client brings in a Stan Winston's animatronic gorilla head from Instinct.
30	206	"Vampires, Swords and the Queen of the Night"	June 26, 2012
Tracey takes Joe to a collector who has a screen-used stunt version of the "General Lee" from the Dukes of Hazzard. Academy-award winning visual effects artist Greg Cannom shows Joe and Brian his Bram Stoker's Dracula collection which includes severed heads, a "Bat-Drac" maquette, Gary Oldman's production head/wig, and his "Hero Wolf-Drac and "Bar-Drac" body suits. Joe and Jon hold an appraisal fair at Frank & Son Collectable Show and appraise Robin Williams' stunt sword from Hook, a "Klingon disruptor" from Star Trek VI: The Undiscovered Country, a "Cardassian phaser" from Star Trek: Deep Space Nine, a 5-foot miniature Batmoblie from Batman, and William Wallace's sword and "hero blade" from Braveheart. Brian heads to Global Effects prop shop to check out a collection which features Dr. Manhattan's gloves from Watchmen, Gort's helmet from The Day the Earth Stood Still, and Whitney Houston's "Queen of the night" dress from The Bodyguard. Also, hundreds of 1950 and 1960s sci-fi movie posters are auctioned off.
