= Sierra Stranger =

1957 film

- Directed by: Lee Sholem
- Screenplay by: Richard Dorso (as Richard J. Dorso)
- Story by: Richard Dorso (as Richard J. Dorso)
- Produced by: Norman T. Herman; Byron Roberts; David T. Yokozeki
- Starring: Howard Duff
- Cinematography: Sam Leavitt
- Edited by: Leon Barsha
- Music by: Alexander Courage
- Production company: Nacirema Productions
- Distributed by: Columbia Pictures
- Release date: May 1, 1957
- Running time: 74 minutes
- Country: United States
- Language: English

Sierra Stranger is a 1957 American Western film directed by Lee Sholem and starring Howard Duff.

The film's sets were designed by the art director Ernst Fegté.

== Plot ==
A prospector becomes a small town outcast after he rescues a man about to be lynched.

== Cast ==
- Howard Duff as Jess Collins
- Gloria McGehee as Meg Anderson
- Dick Foran as Bert Gaines
- John Hoyt as Sheriff
- Barton MacLane as Lem Gotch
- George E. Stone as Barfly Dan
- Ed Kemmer as Sonny Grover
- Robert Foulk as Tom Simmons
- Eve McVeagh as Ruth Gaines
- Henry Kulky as Bartender Matt (as Henry 'Bomber' Kulky)
- Byron Foulger as Claim Clerk Kelso

== Bibliography ==
- Pitts, Michael R. Western Movies: A Guide to 5,105 Feature Films. McFarland, 2012.
