= Ol' Lonely =

Fictional character from Maytag

- Gordon Jump as the Maytag repairman
- First appearance: 1967
- Portrayed by: Jesse White (1967–1988); Gordon Jump (1989–2003); Hardy Rawls (2003–2007); Clay Earl Jackson (2007–2014); Colin Ferguson (2014–present)

In-universe information
- Species: Human
- Gender: Male
- Occupation: Repairman

Ol' Lonely, or "the lonely repairman", is a character in Maytag advertisements, created in 1967 by copywriter Vincent R. Vassolo of the Leo Burnett advertising agency for Maytag.

== History ==
His character was initially played by Jesse White, who retained the role until 1988.

In a time in which the laundry appliances of major manufacturers had reached maturity, differing mostly in minor details, the campaign was designed to remind consumers of the perceived added value in Maytag products derived from the brand's reputation for dependability. Maytag advertisements stated “Ol' Lonely’s predicament is testimony to the durability and reliability of Maytag appliances. Now if only he had something to do with his days.” Other ads stated, "Not all Maytag repairmen are this lonely, but we're trying." The campaign proved a huge success, allowing Maytag to set a substantial price premium, as well as strongly influencing consumer preference at the higher end of the laundry appliance market.

In 1986, the repairman was joined by Newton, a Basset Hound named for Maytag's headquarters in Newton, Iowa. In 1989, after Jesse White retired from acting in 1988, character actor Gordon Jump first appeared as Ol' Lonely in the advertisement "Biker". In total, Jump appeared in more than 77 Maytag commercials and print advertisements. He made appearances at events for employees and customers and also was actively involved in several philanthropic and charitable causes.

In January 2001, Maytag shifted the direction of its iconic "Ol' Lonely" campaign by hiring actor Mark Devine (which played the younger repairman known as the "Maytag Apprentice" from 2001 to 2007), while actor Gordon Jump continued playing the iconic senior repairman.

Actor Hardy Rawls was hired to play Ol' Lonely after Jump's retirement in July 2003, although he appeared only in print advertising and personal appearances. Gordon Jump died two months later on September 22, 2003. In French-speaking Quebec, Ol' Lonely was played by Paul Berval. However, in 2005 Maytag cancelled his contract. Maytag also elected not to renew Rawls' contract, instead holding open auditions. Indianapolis Colts backup quarterback Jim Sorgi was among those who auditioned. On April 2, 2007, Maytag announced that Clay Earl Jackson of Richmond, Virginia had been selected to fill the role of Ol' Lonely.

By the end of the twentieth century, the "Maytag repairman" character had become an iconic metaphor for a professional whose services are rarely needed. Times were changing however, and events at Maytag and within the industry began to diminish the effectiveness of the long-lived Maytag repairman campaign. Consumer demand for innovative, expensive, and increasingly complex electronically controlled and computerized appliances, coupled with higher labor costs and complaints over Maytag product quality and service, influenced a decline in Maytag sales and profit margins. By 2004, the Maytag repairman character had become to some consumers a symbol of misplaced trust in aging marketing campaigns. As one commentator noted, "Unfortunately things change, and, after some major quality hiccups, now it's the Maytag salesman who is bemoaning his loneliness. Maytag's reputation has plunged to the bottom with costly consumer class action lawsuits and numerous quality complaints." As a partial result of Maytag's quality problems, the company reported a loss of $9 million in 2004, according to Industry Week.

In January 2014, Maytag announced a "Generation Five" of the Maytag Repairman, currently played by Colin Ferguson. But instead of commercials showing the repairman waiting around his shop for a Maytag appliance to break, he is playing the part of the actual appliance.

In March 2023, the Maytag Repairman made a highly publicized return from a multi-year hiatus. Colin Ferguson appeared live and in uniform at the BrandSource Summit 2023 in Las Vegas. At the event, Whirlpool hosted a kitchen-vignette photo booth where retail members could take pictures with him.
