= The Bicycle Man =

- Diff'rent Strokes episodes
- Gordon Jump as Mr. Horton
- Episode nos.: Season 5 Episodes 16/17
- Directed by: Gerren Keith
- Teleplay by: Blake Hunter
- Production code: 0516/0517
- Original air dates: February 5, 1983 (Part 1); February 12, 1983 (Part 2)

Guest appearances
- Gordon Jump as Mr. Horton; Shavar Ross as Dudley Johnson; Le Tari as Ted Ramsey; Brad Trumbull as Detective Simpson

Episode chronology
← Previous "Independent Woman"	Next → "Family On Ice"

"The Bicycle Man" is a two-part very special episode of the American sitcom Diff'rent Strokes (1978–1986). Serving as the 16th and 17th episodes of the fifth season, it was written by Blake Hunter, directed by Gerren Keith, and guest-stars Gordon Jump as a bicycle shop owner who tries to molest Arnold Jackson (Gary Coleman) and his friend Dudley Johnson (Shavar Ross). The episode also features Le Tari as Ted Ramsey, Dudley's adoptive father, and Brad Trumbull as Detective Simpson.

"The Bicycle Man" originally aired on NBC on February 5 (Part 1) and February 12, 1983 (Part 2), and was critically acclaimed. In later years, "The Bicycle Man" has been notable for beginning the trend of "very special" sitcom episodes that deal with social issue topics very seriously compared to the tone of the overall series, as well as its dark content. Several publications have ranked it one of the best very special episodes. A scene from "The Bicycle Man" was used in An Open Secret (2014), a documentary film about pedophilia in the film industry.

== Plot ==
=== Part 1 ===
The Drummonds and Jacksons are acquaintances of Mr. Horton, who owns a bicycle shop from which the family regularly rents bicycles. Arnold Jackson is interested in buying a bicycle, but there is skepticism from his father, Phillip Drummond, as well as his siblings, Willis Jackson and Kimberly Drummond. However, Arnold's pleading plus a deal to purchase a red bicycle for a third lower than the actual price offered by Mr. Horton influences Phillip to buy it for Arnold's birthday. Mr. Horton then makes a deal with Arnold for a free handlebar radio to go with the bike if he sends out flyers to other kids at school advertising a sale at the shop, which he successfully does the next day with the help of his friend Dudley. However, in return, Dudley wants in on Arnold's deal with Mr. Horton to get a radio for his own bike.

Later Arnold goes to the shop asking Mr. Horton for more flyers. In the encounter, Mr. Horton brings Arnold into his apartment, in the store's back room, and serves Arnold a banana split, while discussing the possibility of Arnold using the bicycle for free before his birthday; Mr. Horton also instructs Arnold to keep this, and their other encounters a secret. Arnold also mentions Dudley wanting in on the deal to pass out flyers for a radio, and Mr. Horton tells Arnold to bring Dudley over to discuss it further. Arnold comes home later than usual that night, which is noticed by Phillip as well as Willis; however, Arnold's lie about getting pretzels before he got home is enough for his relatives to think little of it. Arnold brings Dudley to his next private meeting with Mr. Horton, but it is too rainy for Arnold to ride around the park. Mr. Horton uses this opportunity to entice the two with pizza, wine, and pornographic magazines. The boys, especially Arnold, are hesitant to drink wine, but Mr. Horton justifies it by claiming their business partnership qualifies as a special occasion to sip some wine. Mr. Horton also shows them pictures of himself skinny dipping with other kids and plays a game of "Tarzan" involving them taking pictures of each other, with Dudley being shirtless.

=== Part 2 ===
Arnold then realizes the possibility of Phillip smelling wine on his breath, so Mr. Horton offers Arnold and Dudley gum and breath mints to hide the scent. When Phillip arrives at the shop to pay for Arnold’s bicycle, Arnold and Dudley, realizing they could easily get into trouble, escape through the back door. At the Drummond home, Kimberly and Willis notice the smell. Arnold admits to drinking alcohol, but lies that Dudley's father let him have a few sips for a special occasion. The siblings agree to keep it a secret from Phillip. Arnold and Dudley go to the shop again the next day, Arnold admitting to Mr. Horton that he feels funny about having the secret meetings, even being unsure of watching some cartoons Mr. Horton got for them to watch. However, Mr. Horton's offer of Boston cream pie gets Arnold to stay, until a showing of a Fritz the Cat-esque adult cartoon Murphy the Mouse, while gaining Dudley's attention, also bothers Arnold to the point where he leaves the shop; this leaves Dudley and Horton to play a game of "Neptune: King of the Sea" alone.

Arnold returns home, just after Phillip learns from Ted about Dudley's drinking, forcing Willis and Kimberly to tell them about Arnold's drinking. This forces Arnold to confess, especially as a result of being bothered by the cartoon, that Mr. Horton gave him the wine and pizza, along with the other graphic content he showed Arnold and Dudley. This, plus revealing that Dudley is still at the shop, triggers Phillip into action, calling the police to raid the place and to arrest Mr. Horton. Phillip, Ted, and Police Detective Simpson go and find Dudley in the bathroom, feeling dizzy after Mr. Horton offered him a pill that would make him "feel good". He also confesses to the three that Mr. Horton tried to touch him and admits to feeling scared. Ted reassures Dudley that it is not his fault for the situation, and will not be punished, and takes him home. At the Drummonds', Simpson tells the siblings that Dudley will come out of this experience just fine. He also mentions that he and the police found considerable evidence against Mr. Horton in the raid, including his graphic photos and the cartoons. Phillip and Simpson discuss other "red flags" to search for in pedophiles, and Phillip assures Arnold he will still get the bicycle and the radio for his birthday, and the two hug as the episode ends.

In a voiceover, Conrad Bain instructs viewers to contact law enforcement or social service agencies if there is suspicion of child sexual abuse.

== Production ==
As with all episodes of Diff'rent Strokes for seasons two to eight, "The Bicycle Man" was directed by Gerren Keith. It was also Blake Hunter's third writing credit for the series, after "In the Swim" and "Shoot-Out at the O.K. Arcade." Gordon Jump, who was typecast through his career, described it as a "gamble" to portray a pedophile "because you get typed so easily.” He called playing Mr. Horton "one of [his] most painful but rewarding parts." Todd Bridges described acting in "The Bicycle Man" a "very hard week,” as he had been sexually abused several times by his publicist during his time with Diff'rent Strokes.

== Reception ==
=== Initial broadcast ===
The first part of "The Bicycle Man" originally aired on NBC on February 5, 1983, its second part a week later. The episode was critically acclaimed. The New York Times praised the episode for being "written skillfully" and "directed sensitively", particularly highlighting the acknowledgement of pedophiles not being homosexuals. The Washington Post called it "a calm, careful and intelligent treatment of a difficult and potentially traumatizing subject. There seems little possibility that watching this program would do children harm, and considerable likelihood it could do them good." Later in 1983, a nine-year-old in La Porte, Indiana viewed a re-run of the episode, which influenced him to inform his mother about a man engaging in similar behavior around the area. He was arrested by police in September, and LaPorte police credited the episode for the arrest. "The Bicycle Man" started a trend of "very special episodes" in sitcoms, which feature subject matter serious for the general comic tone of the shows. For writing the second part of "The Bicycle Man", Hunter was nominated for a Humanitas Prize award in the 30 Minute Network or Syndicated Television category.

=== Later years ===
Publication obituaries of Jump's death in September 2003 highlighted his role in "The Bicycle Man", the Los Angeles Times describing it as a "daring career turn" and Reason his "most notorious turn". Scenes from the episode have made lists of best moments from the series by publications such as Entertainment Weekly and The Daily Beast. Peter Hartlaub of the San Francisco Chronicle ranked it the third best very special episode in 2009; and it topped both Mental Floss's list of best very special episodes and MeTV's ranking of the best very special episodes from Diff'rent Strokes. In 2008, it was one of Esquire's "Five Most Very Special Episodes from 1980s Sitcoms". Greg Wyshynski named the very special episodes of Diff'rent Strokes his favorite from the show, including "The Bicycle Man".

Mark A. Robinson, writer of Sitcommentary: Television Comedies That Changed America, claimed "The Bicycle Man" was "a haunting episode of sitcom television, bearing a gravitas that shaped the minds of many children of making safe choices." Concluded writer Bill Simmons, "I can't imagine any sitcom ever went to a darker place. And no, I have never forgiven Gordon Jump for what he did to Dudley." "These scenes have the Very Special Episode's uniquely cringe-worthy meld of earnest edutainment and laugh-track yuks. But I've never seen one that actually dramatizes a child molester seducing a child with a banana split", opined Vulture's Emily Nussbaum in 2010. "The Bicycle Man" has been featured on publication lists of dark television moments, some of them distressed by its inappropriate use of jokes and canned laughter for the subject of the story. Esquire claimed the cartoon porn sequence "wasn't just risqué for primetime television; this is risqué even by niche Internet porn standards."

Zack Furness, a writer and scholar of bicycle culture, noted that bicyclists had a stereotype of being "sexually bizarre", which he partially attributed to "The Bicycle Man".

== In other media ==
Cinefamily's 2011 event TV Tuesday: A Very Special Episode Returns presented "The Bicycle Man" among other notable very special episodes. The scene of the detective differentiating homosexuals and pedophiles is featured in the documentary film An Open Secret (2015).

== See also ==
- Anti-pedophile activism
