= A Child Is Waiting =

1963 film by John Cassavetes

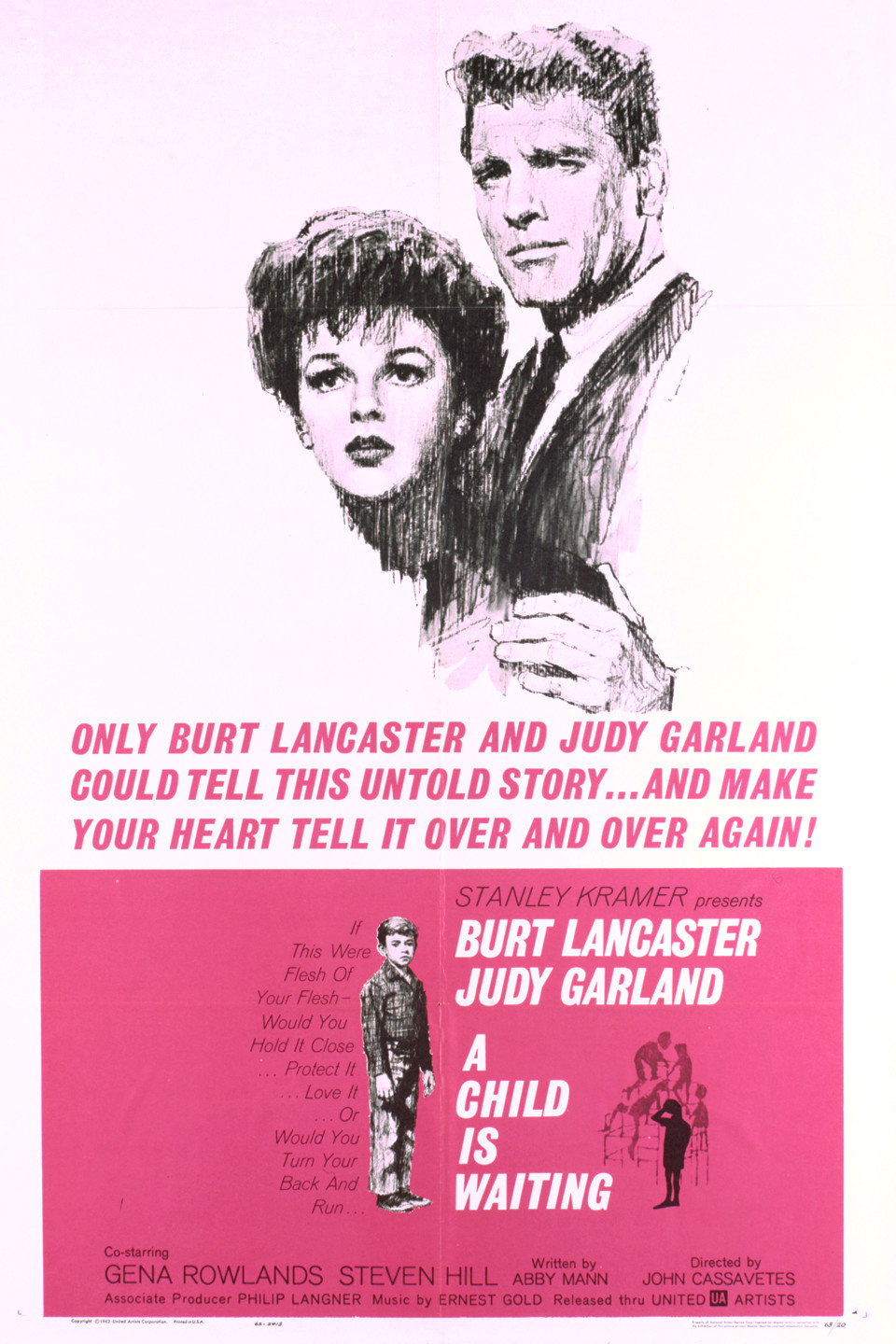
- Theatrical release poster by Howard Terpning
- Directed by: John Cassavetes
- Written by: Abby Mann
- Based on: A Child Is Waiting a 1957 teleplay by Abby Mann
- Produced by: Stanley Kramer
- Starring: Burt Lancaster; Judy Garland; Gena Rowlands; Steven Hill
- Cinematography: Joseph LaShelle
- Edited by: Gene Fowler, Jr. Robert C. Jones
- Music by: Ernest Gold
- Production company: Stanley Kramer Productions
- Distributed by: United Artists
- Release dates: January 23, 1963 (Los Angeles); February 13, 1963 (New York City)
- Running time: 104 minutes
- Country: United States
- Language: English
- Budget: $2 million
- Box office: $925,000

A Child Is Waiting is a 1963 American drama film directed by John Cassavetes, produced by Stanley Kramer, and written by Abby Mann based on his 1957 Studio One teleplay of the same name. It stars Burt Lancaster and Judy Garland as, respectively, the director of a state institution for intellectually disabled and emotionally disturbed children, and a new teacher who challenges his methods.

== Plot ==
In New Jersey, Jean Hansen, a thirty-something woman who has been struggling to find direction and purpose in her life, applies for a job at Crawthorne State Training School, an institution for intellectually disabled and emotionally disturbed children. Her friend Mattie, who is already a teacher at Crawthorne, gives her a good recommendation, so the director of the school, Dr. Matthew Clark, hires Jean to teach music, as she once studied to be a concert pianist at Juilliard. Jean thinks both that Dr. Clark's training methods are more strict than they need to be and that, for Reuben Widdicombe, a twelve-year-old student, they are ineffective.

Jean becomes close with Reuben and is heartbroken when she learns that neither of his (now-divorced) parents have returned to visit him since he was dropped off at Crawthorne two years earlier, but he still waits for his mother every visitation day. She asks Dr. Clark if she can write to Reuben's mother, but he tells her not to, and, feeling she has become too emotionally involved with Reuben, switches which dormitory she supervises to separate her from the boy. Reuben begins to act out more after this, so Jean contacts Reuben's mother without Dr. Clark's permission.

Thinking Reuben is ill, his mother, Sophie, comes to Crawthorne and speaks with Jean. When she realizes the truth, she tearfully tells Jean that she has convinced herself that Reuben will have a better chance in life if he attends Crawthorne, but that it is too painful to see him, and leaves. Reuben, who is playing outside, sees her go and chases her car. Distraught, he runs away from Crawthorne that night.

Reuben is not found until the following evening, when Dr. Clark is called to pick him up from a police station. Jean offers to resign, but Dr. Clark, after explaining that his methods are intended to make their students as self-sufficient as possible and taking Jean to an institution for adults with mental disabilities, which he says is where their students will end up if they are coddled, asks her to stay and to continue her rehearsals for the Thanksgiving pageant.

Reuben's father, Ted, arrives at Crawthorne during the pageant, intending to transfer Reuben to a private institution. When he hears his son recite a poem, however, he decides to leave Reuben at Crawthorne, and, after the performance, talks to Reuben for the first time in two years. The parents of a new student enter the auditorium and tell Dr. Clark that their son does not want to get out of the car, so Dr. Clark sends Jean out to talk to him.

== Cast ==
- Burt Lancaster as Dr. Matthew Clark, a psychologist and the director of the Crawthorne State Training School
- Judy Garland as Jean Hansen, the new music teacher at Crawthorne
- Gena Rowlands as Sophie Widdicombe (later Benham), Reuben's mother
- Steven Hill as Ted Widdicombe, Reuben's father
- Paul Stewart as Goodman, an administrator at Crawthorne
- Gloria McGehee as Mattie, a teacher at Crawthorne and Jean's friend
- Lawrence Tierney as Douglas Benham, Sophie's second husband
- Bruce Ritchey as Reuben Widdicombe
  - Keith and Kerry Simon as infant Reuben
- John Marley as Holland, a government official
- Elizabeth Wilson as Miss Fogarty, a teacher at Crawthorne
- Barbara Pepper as Mrs. Brown, a teacher at Crawthorne (uncredited)
- Marilyn Clark as Miss Hamilton, Dr. Clark's secretary (uncredited)
- June Walker as Miss McDonald, a teacher at Crawthorne (uncredited)
- Juanita Moore as Julius' mother (uncredited)
- Mario Gallo as Dr. Ernie Lombardi, a government official (uncredited)
- Cliff Carnell as the desk sergeant at the police station (uncredited)

== Production ==
Producer Stanley Kramer modeled the film's school on the Vineland Training School in New Jersey. He said he wanted to bring the plight of mentally and emotionally disturbed children to the filmgoing public and try "to throw a spotlight on a dark-ages type of social thinking which has tried to relegate the subject of retardation to a place under the rocks." Kramer wanted to cast Burt Lancaster because Lancaster had a troubled child of his own (his son Bill had polio that made one of his legs shorter than the other). Ingrid Bergman, Katharine Hepburn, and Elizabeth Taylor were considered for the role of Jean Hansen, which ultimately went to Judy Garland, who previously had worked with Lancaster and Kramer on the 1961 film Judgment at Nuremberg. Garland was experiencing personal problems, but it was hoped that a supportive work environment would help her overcome them.

When original director Jack Clayton was forced to withdraw because of a scheduling issue, he was replaced by John Cassavetes, who was still under contract to Paramount Pictures, on the recommendation of screenwriter Abby Mann. Cassavetes was fond of improvisation, and his approach to filmmaking clashed with those of Kramer and the leading players.

Most of the students in the film were portrayed by children with actual mental disabilities from Pacific State Hospital (later known as Lanterman Developmental Center) in Pomona, California. After the film's release, Kramer recalled that "They surprised us every day in reaction and what they did." About the children in the film, Lancaster said: "We have to ad-lib around the periphery of a scene and I have to attune and adjust myself to the unexpected things they do. But they are much better than child actors for the parts. They have certain gestures that are characteristic, very difficult for even an experienced actor."

Problems arose between Kramer and Cassavetes during post-production. According to editor Gene Fowler, Jr., "It was a fight of technique. Stanley is a more traditional picture-maker, and Cassavetes was, I guess, called Nouvelle Vague. He was trying some things, which frankly I disagreed with, and I thought he was hurting the picture by blunting the so-called message with technique." Cassavetes felt that his personal feelings about the subject matter added to his disagreements with Kramer, who eventually fired him and recut the film. In a later interview, Cassavetes said:

The difference in the two versions is that Stanley's picture said that retarded children belong in institutions and the picture I shot said retarded children are better in their own way than supposedly healthy adults. The philosophy of his film was that retarded children are separate and alone and therefore should be in institutions with others of their kind. My film said that retarded children could be anywhere, any time, and that the problem is that we're a bunch of dopes, that it's our problem more than the kids'. The point of the original picture that we made was that there was no fault, that there was nothing wrong with these children except that their mentality was lower.

Cassavetes disowned the completed film, although, following its release, he said: "I didn't think his film—and that's what I consider it to be, his film—was so bad, just a lot more sentimental than mine." For his part, Kramer later observed: "My dream was to jump the barrier of ordinary objection to the subject matter into an area in which the treatment of it and the performance of it would be so exquisite that it would transcend all that. Somewhere we failed."

== Reception ==
=== Box office ===
The film recorded a loss of $2 million.

=== Critical reception ===
In a contemporary review in The New York Times, critic Bosley Crowther wrote:

Don't go to see it expecting to be agreeably entertained or, for that matter, really uplifted by examples of man's nobility. The drama of social service, written by Abby Mann to convey a general illustration of the philosophy and kind of work done in modern institutions for retarded children, is presented in such conventional terms that it has no more impact or validity than an average television-doctor show. [...] Miss Garland's misty-eyed compassion and Mr. Lancaster's crisp authority as the all-seeing, all-knowing doctor who patiently runs the home are of a standard dramatic order. Gena Rowlands and Steven Hill are a bit more erratic and thus convincing as the highly emotional parents of the boy. But top honors go to Bruce Ritchey, who plays the latter role, and to the group of actual retarded children who appear uninhibitedly in this film. To them and to John Cassavetes, who directed them with notable control [...] we must be thankful that what might have been harrowing and even distasteful beyond words to behold comes out as a forthright, moving documentation of most unfortunate but hopeful youngsters in a school. From the graphic accounts of how their teachers treat them and train them, how the rule of firm, realistic and unemotional discipline is preserved, and from the simplifications of theory that appear in the dialogue, one should learn a great deal from this picture – all of which should be helpful and give hope.

Critic Philip K. Scheuer of the Los Angeles Times wrote: "A Child Is Waiting, the film about mentally retarded children, is neither documentary nor staged drama—or, rather, it attempts to be both, unsuccessfully. [...] For by whatever curious alchemy it is that governs the emotions in the theater, A Child Is Waiting seemed real but undramatic to me. I found it all distressing in the extreme."

In a more positive review, Variety called the film "a poignant, provocative, revealing dramatization", and added: "Burt Lancaster delivers a firm, sincere, persuasive and unaffected performance as the professionally objective but understanding psychologist who heads the institution. Judy Garland gives a sympathetic portrayal of an overly involved teacher who comes to see the error of her obsession with the plight of one child."

== Home media ==
A Child Is Waiting was released on Blu-ray and DVD by Kino Lorber Studio Classics in November 2015.

== See also ==
- List of American films of 1963
- Mental institution
- Message picture
