= List of Diff'rent Strokes episodes =

Diff'rent Strokes is an American sitcom that aired on NBC from November 3, 1978, to May 4, 1985, and subsequently on ABC from September 27, 1985, to March 7, 1986. This list includes synopses and air dates. Episodes are in original U.S. airdate order; some syndication and overseas airings have varied the running order. Some markets, such as British satellite channel Sky One in the early 1990s, have aired the episodes in production order.

== Series overview ==
All eight seasons have been released on DVD, with the final season released on May 29, 2018.

Season	Episodes	Originally released			Rank	Rating
Season	Episodes	First released	Last released	Network	Rank	Rating
1	24	November 3, 1978	May 4, 1979	NBC	27	19.9
2	26	September 21, 1979	March 26, 1980	NBC	26	20.3
3	22	November 12, 1980	May 13, 1981	NBC	17	20.7 (Note: Tied with Fantasy Island and Trapper John, M.D.)
4	26	October 29, 1981	May 20, 1982	NBC	36	—N/a
5	24	October 2, 1982	May 14, 1983	NBC	51	—N/a
6	24	October 1, 1983	May 12, 1984	NBC	50	15.1 (Note: Tied with Matt Houston and Oh Madeline)
7	24	September 29, 1984	May 4, 1985	NBC	37	14.7
8	19	September 27, 1985	March 7, 1986	ABC	69	11.5

== Episodes ==
=== Season 1 (1978–79) ===
No. overall	No. in season	Title	Directed by	Written by	Original release date	Prod. code
1	1	"Movin' In"	Herbert Kenwith	Ben Starr	November 3, 1978	101
Wealthy Phillip Drummond (Conrad Bain) prepares to take in two boys from Harlem, Arnold (Gary Coleman) and Willis Jackson (Todd Bridges), who were the sons of his late housekeeper. Mr. Drummond plans to have the boys live in his Park Avenue apartment with him, his daughter Kimberly (Dana Plato), and new housekeeper Edna Garrett (Charlotte Rae). Arnold appreciates Mr. Drummond's offer to take him in, but Willis wants to move back to their former home in Harlem. Arnold helps convince him otherwise.
2	2	"The Social Worker"	Herbert Kenwith	Budd Grossman	November 10, 1978	102
A social worker (Ellen Travolta) suggests that Willis and Arnold should live with a black family instead of with the Drummonds and Arnold gets the impression that Mr. Drummond agrees with that. Note: Dana Plato does not appear in this episode.
3	3	"Mother's Last Visit"	Herbert Kenwith	William Raynor and Myles Wilder	November 17, 1978	103
Mr. Drummond's mother (Irene Tedrow) visits and is surprised when she sees that his new sons are black, so he tries to make her get over her racial prejudices. Note: Although mentioned by Drummond in many episodes, this is the only occasion where his mother is actually seen.
4	4	"The Prep School"	Herbert Kenwith	Story by : Michael Russnow; Teleplay by : Alan Rosen & Fred Rubin and Michael Russnow	November 24, 1978	105
Mr. Drummond enrolls Arnold and Willis at his former school, but the headmaster (Howard Morton) makes arrangements for them to fail their entrance exams. Notes: Dana Plato does not appear in this episode. This episode features the first appearance of Willis' catchphrase "Say what?"
5	5	"The Spanking"	Herbert Kenwith	Fred S. Fox and Seaman Jacobs	December 1, 1978	104
Arnold hides from Mr. Drummond, to avoid getting spanked for dropping a water bomb on Henry, the maintenance man. Willis decides to dole out the punishment himself, but spanking Arnold proves far more painful for Willis than for Arnold.
6	6	"Goodbye, Dolly"	Herbert Kenwith	Albert E. Lewin	December 8, 1978	106
Arnold's prized doll is sold and Arnold has trouble going to sleep without it, so Mr. Drummond hires a private investigator to track down the doll. The P.I. decides to have a replica made instead, but Arnold knows the difference. Eventually he sleeps anyway.
7	7	"The Trial"	Herbert Kenwith	Alan Rosen & Fred Rubin	December 15, 1978	107
Arnold is accused of putting his goldfish Abraham in the hot tub and he is put on trial by the Drummond family to prove his innocence. It turns out Willis had done it to prove a point that everyone is "innocent until proven guilty".
8	8	"Retrospective" "The First Christmas"	Herbert Kenwith	Budd Grossman, Howard Leeds and Ben Starr	December 29, 1978	116
9	9	"Retrospective" "The First Christmas"	Herbert Kenwith	Budd Grossman, Howard Leeds and Ben Starr	December 29, 1978	116
The Drummond family recall past events on their first Christmas with Willis and Arnold. Notes: On first airing, this episode can be found billed as both "The First Christmas" and "Retrospective" in different sources. For reruns, where it would be typically shown out of season, it is listed as "Retrospective". This episode exits in several different versions, and was split into two parts for syndication. Not all syndication and international packages of the series include this episode. Produced later in the season but brought forward to be broadcast at Christmas, the rerun version features clips from "The Fight". However, as "The Fight" episode had not yet aired on original broadcast, due this hour-long retrospective being brought forward to be shown at Christmas, these sequencs were not featured on the original airing, with several of the other flashback clips featured running for slightly longer to make up the difference in time. The sequences from "The Fight" appear in the re-run version. The original airing opened with a unique intro, as the standard closing credits theme plays over a slow pan of a Christmas tree and Arnold and Willis' beds as they sleep, whilst the opening credits appear on-screen. On rerun versions, the standard first season opening is used. For two-part syndicated versions, some have Part One opening with the unique Christmas opening, other versions have the standard first season opening credits on both part 1 and 2. The DVD and on-line streaming version use the original broadcast opening, with the unique opening intro and without scenes from "The Trial".
10	10	"The Fight"	Herbert Kenwith	Sandy Veith	January 5, 1979	108
Arnold is forced to deal with a bully at school; Mr. Drummond doesn't want him to fight, but Willis thinks fighting is the only option. Note: This is the first mention of the unseen bully known as "The Gooch," who is often mentioned on the show but never appeared in person. This episode is the only time that the character's first name is ever given - "Stuart".
11	11	"The Club Meeting"	Herbert Kenwith	Tom and Helen August	January 12, 1979	109
Arnold and Willis invite their old friends from Harlem to their new Park Avenue home and let their wealth go to their heads.
12	12	"The Woman"	Herbert Kenwith	Ronald Alexander	January 19, 1979	110
Mr. Drummond wants to marry a woman (Elinor Donahue) who has plans to send the kids away to boarding school.
13	13	"No Time for Arnold"	Herbert Kenwith	Albert E. Lewin	January 26, 1979	111
Arnold fakes bedwetting to get some attention, but when the secret comes out, Willis decides to play a trick on his brother to get even.
14	14	"The Relative"	Herbert Kenwith	Fred S. Fox and Seaman Jacobs	February 2, 1979	112
A distant cousin (LaWanda Page) visits Arnold and Willis and when she sees how well they are living, she fakes an injury to overextend her stay.
15	15	"The Tutor"	Herbert Kenwith	Sandy Veith	February 9, 1979	113
Mr. Drummond hires a tutor (Barry Diamond) for Willis and Arnold who has very unorthodox methods for getting them to learn, but with his help he discovers a mental block that prevents Willis from remembering things that happened in 1975, the year his father died.
16	16	"The New Landlord"	Herbert Kenwith	Norman Liebmann	February 16, 1979	114
A new landlord (Jack Riley) tries to have the Drummonds thrown out of their penthouse apartment because he doesn't like children.
17	17	"Willis' Privacy" "No Privacy for Willis"	Herbert Kenwith	Alan Rosen & Fred Rubin	February 23, 1979	115
Willis is tired of having Arnold hang around him all the time, so he goes back to Harlem to get away from him - possibly for good. Arnold imagines himself to be a Superman knockoff named Super Arnold. Note: Dana Plato does not appear in this episode, which was reenacted for the third edition of Live in Front of a Studio Audience.
18	18	"Mrs. Garrett's Crisis"	Herbert Kenwith	Karyl Geld Miller	March 2, 1979	117
Mrs. Garrett experiences a midlife crisis when she feels her life isn't as exciting as her friends' lives, but she soon realizes how much she is needed by the Drummond family.
19	19	"The Job" "Willis' Job"	Herbert Kenwith	Albert E. Lewin	March 16, 1979	118
Willis is hired and fired from a new job all in one day and tries to hide it from Mr. Drummond since he thinks he'll be disappointed in him.
20	20	"The Trip"	Herbert Kenwith (Part 1); Doug Rogers (Part 2)	Howard Leeds & Martin Cohan & Ben Starr	March 30, 1979	120
21	21	"The Trip"	Herbert Kenwith (Part 1); Doug Rogers (Part 2)	Howard Leeds & Martin Cohan & Ben Starr	March 30, 1979	120
In the first of three crossovers with the series Hello, Larry, Mr. Drummond's company buys the radio station where his old war buddy Larry Alder (McLean Stevenson) works, so he and his family travel to Portland, Oregon to visit Larry and his two daughters, Ruthie (Kim Richards) and Diane (Donna Wilkes). Note: Part 2 was originally a Hello, Larry episode. For syndication, international and DVD markets, it is repackaged as a Diff'rent Strokes episode. Some international packages of the series do not include this or the other Hello, Larry crossover episodes.
22	22	"Getting Involved"	Herbert Kenwith	Story by : Howard Leeds & Martin Cohan & Ben Starr; Teleplay by : Norman Liebmann	April 6, 1979	119
Arnold witnesses a robbery and goes to the police, although a threatening phone call forces Mr. Drummond to prevent Arnold's involvement.
23	23	"Willis' Birthday" "The Birthday Party"	Herbert Kenwith	Michael G. Moye	April 13, 1979	121
Willis wants to have his birthday party back in Harlem with his friends, but Mr. Drummond is apprehensive about going there.
24	24	"The Girls School" "Garrett's Girls"	Herbert Kenwith	Story by : Dick Clair & Jenna McMahon and Howard Leeds & Ben Starr; Teleplay by : Howard Leeds & Ben Starr	May 4, 1979	122
Mrs. Garrett helps out the girls of the chaotic dormitory at Eastland. Note: This episode is the backdoor pilot for the spin-off The Facts of Life, although it contains a number of differences from the eventual series. Garrett's Girls was an early proposed title for The Facts of Life.

=== Season 2 (1979–80) ===
No. overall	No. in season	Title	Directed by	Written by	Original release date	Prod. code
25	1	"Arnold's Girlfriend"	Gerren Keith	Howard Leeds & Ben Starr & Martin Cohan	September 21, 1979	202
26	2	"Arnold's Girlfriend"	Gerren Keith	Howard Leeds & Ben Starr & Martin Cohan	September 21, 1979	203
Arnold is too scared to go to the doctor after he suffers appendicitis, but his fear goes away when he meets a young girl named Alice who is having her tonsils out and they plan to share a room together in the hospital. However, her father (Dabney Coleman) decides against it when he finds out Arnold is black and Mr. Drummond negates a planned real estate deal he had with him. In order to be together, Arnold and Alice run away, which leads to both families frantically searching for them before Arnold's appendix bursts.
27	3	"Feudin' and Fussin"	Gerren Keith	Howard Leeds & Ben Starr & Martin Cohan	September 28, 1979	204
28	4	"Feudin' and Fussin"	Gerren Keith	Howard Leeds & Ben Starr & Martin Cohan	September 28, 1979	204
The Alders visit New York in this second crossover with Hello, Larry, as the Drummonds help Larry get a job hosting a talk show. Note: Basketball player Meadowlark Lemon guest stars. Note: Part 2 was originally a Hello, Larry episode. For syndication, international and DVD markets, it is repackaged as a Diff'rent Strokes episode.
29	5	"Mrs. Garrett's Romance" "Mrs. Garrett's Lover"	Gerren Keith	Jerry Winnick	October 12, 1979	205
Mrs. Garrett dates a much younger man (Philip Charles MacKenzie), but finds out he's really looking for a mother instead of a lover.
30	6	"Birds and Bees"	Gerren Keith	Ed Jurist	October 19, 1979	208
When a neighbor's pregnancy leads to Arnold asking about where babies come from, he is given conflicting stories from both Willis and Mr. Drummond.
31	7	"Arnold's Hero" "The Hero"	Gerren Keith	Story by : Martin A. Ragaway; Teleplay by : Martin A. Ragaway and Howard Leeds & Ben Starr & Martin Cohan	October 24, 1979	201
In order to get boxer Muhammad Ali to visit Arnold, Kimberly and Willis tell him that Arnold is dying.
32	8	"The Adoption: Part 1"	Gerren Keith	Alan Rosen & Fred Rubin	October 31, 1979	206
The time comes for Mr. Drummond to officially adopt Arnold and Willis, but a junk dealer named Jethro Simpson (Whitman Mayo) pretends to be their cousin and tries to interfere with the adoption in order to obtain an inheritance coming to the boys. Note: First appearance of Robert Rockwell as Mr. Drummond's lawyer, Tom Bishop.
33	9	"The Adoption: Part 2"	Gerren Keith	Alan Rosen & Fred Rubin	November 7, 1979	207
When it looks like Willis and Arnold will legally have to live with Jethro, the truth about him is revealed and the boys are able to officially become members of Mr. Drummond's family.
34	10	"Father and Son Day"	Gerren Keith	Joseph Sirota and Elaine Newman	November 14, 1979	209
Willis trades in Mr. Drummond for another man (Reggie Jackson) to win an athletic competition.
35	11	"Thanksgiving Crossover"	Gerren Keith	Story by : George Tibbles; Teleplay by : Howard Leeds & Ben Starr & Martin Cohan	November 28, 1979	211
36	12	"Thanksgiving Crossover"	Gerren Keith	Story by : George Tibbles; Teleplay by : Howard Leeds & Ben Starr & Martin Cohan	November 28, 1979	211
The Alders visit the Drummonds in the final Hello, Larry crossover, when Larry and Mr. Drummond argue over a potential business deal. Note: Part 2 was originally a Hello, Larry episode. For syndication, international and DVD markets, it is repackaged as a Diff'rent Strokes episode.
37	13	"The Rivals"	Gerren Keith	Albert E. Lewin	December 5, 1979	210
A girl feigns interest in Arnold so she can get close to Willis. Note: This is the last episode featuring Charlotte Rae as a cast member, as she continued her role as Mrs. Garrett on the spin-off The Facts of Life. The character exits off-screen, not mentioned until following episodes.
38	14	"Hot Watch"	Gerren Keith	Charles Stewart, Jr. and Charles Stewart, Sr.	December 12, 1979	212
Arnold and Willis find a lost watch in the building, but soon become suspects when it is discovered the watch was taken from a burglarized apartment.
39	15	"The Dog Story" "A Dog Story"	Gerren Keith	Story by : Jess Korman; Teleplay by : Roland Wolpert	December 19, 1979	213
Arnold may have been bitten by a rabid dog and he tries to do whatever he can to prevent getting rabies shots.
40	16	"The Election"	Gerren Keith	Story by : Howard Leeds & Ben Starr & Martin Cohan; Teleplay by : Ed Jurist	January 9, 1980	214
Mr. Drummond makes a last minute bid to run for a local political office. Note: First appearance of Nedra Volz as the second housekeeper, Adelaide Brubaker, who would appear as a recurring character during the second through fourth seasons. She is not added to the opening credits, instead always being billed with the guest cast on the closing credits (this was due initially to an agreement in Charlotte Rae's contract that she be permitted to return to Diff'rent Strokes should The Facts of Life be axed).
41	17	"Friendly Mate" "Drummond's Blind Date"	Gerren Keith	Dawn Aldredge	January 16, 1980	215
Willis and Arnold set Mr. Drummond up on a blind date, but confusion arises when the dating service thinks Mr. Drummond is black and he also ends up with a second date for the same night.
42	18	"Poor Drummond"	Gerren Keith	Story by : Jaie Brashar; Teleplay by : Ed Jurist and Howard Leeds & Ben Starr & Martin Cohan and Jaie Brashar	January 23, 1980	217
Mr. Drummond's failure to obtain a business loan causes the family to think they're on the verge of financial ruin, so Arnold and Willis try to put their dad on welfare. However, a man from the welfare office thinks something is fishy and investigates.
43	19	"Big Business"	Gerren Keith	Story by : George Geiger; Teleplay by : George Geiger and Ed Jurist & Howard Leeds & Ben Starr & Martin Cohan	January 30, 1980	216
Arnold and Willis go into the brownie business, but get in over their heads when they alienate Kimberly and overwork Adelaide, so they're forced to make the brownies themselves.
44	20	"Return of the Gooch"	Gerren Keith	Story by : Howard Leeds & Ben Starr & Martin Cohan; Teleplay by : Alan Rosen & Fred Rubin	February 6, 1980	218
Arnold takes martial arts lessons to defend himself against the Gooch, then gets in trouble when Willis convinces him he has a "killer foot." Note: Soon-tek Oh and former Mouseketeer Curtis Wong guest star as Arnold's sensei and, respectively, a fellow karate student.
45	21	"Valentine's Day Retrospective" "Valentine's Vigil"	Gerren Keith	Story by : Howard Leeds & Ben Starr & Martin Cohan and Stephen Fischer & Arlene Sanford; Teleplay by : Howard Leeds & Ben Starr & Martin Cohan	February 13, 1980	219
Arnold and Willis accidentally get locked in the basement of their apartment building, so they recall previous emotional events to pass the time until someone lets them out.
46	22	"Skin Deep or True Blue" "Guess Who?"	Gerren Keith	Story by : Howard Leeds & Ben Starr & Martin Cohan; Teleplay by : Sandy Veith & Donald Ross	February 20, 1980	221
Kimberly's new love interest, Roger (Grant Wilson), is found out to be a bigot when he won't let his sister, Emily (Melora Hardin), go on a date with Willis, so Kimberly comes up with a way to teach him a lesson.
47	23	"Teacher's Pet"	Gerren Keith	Sandy Veith & Donald Ross	February 27, 1980	220
Arnold's teacher, Ms. Osborne (Mary Ann Mobley), begins favoring him after she dates Mr. Drummond. Notes: This is the first appearances of Shavar Ross and Steven Mond as Dudley Johnson and Robbie Jason, respectively. Mobley would eventually take over the role of Mr. Drummond's second wife, Maggie McKinney-Drummond, in the eighth season after Dixie Carter left the series.
48	24	"The Slumber Party"	Gerren Keith	Fred S. Fox and Seaman Jacobs	March 12, 1980	222
Willis' friends and Kimberly's schoolmates clash over who gets to do what in the apartment and ruin Mr. Drummond's date in the process. Note: Mindy Cohn, Julie Anne Haddock, Kim Fields and Molly Ringwald appear as their characters from The Facts of Life (Natalie, Cindy, Tootie and Molly, respectively).
49	25	"Arnold Faces Fatality" "The Will"	Gerren Keith	Albert E. Lewin	March 19, 1980	223
Arnold's beloved goldfish Abraham dies, so the family tries to hide it from him until they can get a replacement. When Arnold becomes suspicious and happens to notice Mr. Drummond's will, he jumps to the wrong conclusion and thinks that Mr. Drummond is dying.
50	26	"The Squealer"	Gerren Keith	Story by : Joseph Sirota & Elaine Newman; Teleplay by : Ed Jurist & Alan Rosen & Fred Rubin	March 26, 1980	224
Willis joins a local youth club, the Tarantulas, which turns out to be a street gang. Having had a previous run-in with the Tarantulas, Mr. Drummond forbids Willis to associate with them. Torn between defying Drummond and losing face, Willis ultimately lands in jail (along with his new "friends") for vandalism; so does he learn that there's a time and a place for everything...even "squealing" and "copping out".: Notes: David Coburn, who would later lend his voice to the wisecracking title superhero from Captain Planet & the Planeteers, portrays the Tarantulas' sole sympathetic member.; This is the final episode of the series to employ the original opening-credit sequence (Drummond collects both Jackson brothers from Harlem and brings them, via limousine, to his apartment building).

=== Season 3 (1980–81) ===
No. overall	No. in season	Title	Directed by	Written by	Original release date	Prod. code
51	1	"The Bank Job"	Gerren Keith	Howard Leeds & Ben Starr & Martin Cohan	November 12, 1980	302
52	2	"The Bank Job"	Gerren Keith	Howard Leeds & Ben Starr & Martin Cohan	November 12, 1980	303
Arnold wants to impress Tootie with his "riches" when the Drummond family goes on a trip, so he and Willis go to the bank to make a withdrawal, but the two of them along with Mr. Drummond get trapped during a holdup by robbers (Michael Cavanaugh and Jesse D. Goins). In the end, quick thinking by Arnold, Willis, and Mr. Drummond saves the day. Note: Kim Fields guest stars as Tootie.
53	3	"Small Claims Court"	Gerren Keith	Story by : Hugh Wedlock & Ben Gershman; Teleplay by : Ed Jurist & Gordon Mitchell and Hugh Wedlock & Ben Gershman	November 19, 1980	305
Arnold takes a toy store owner to small claims court over a faulty train engine.
54	4	"Substitute Mother"	Gerren Keith	Story by : Patricia Kane and Debra Frank & Scott Rubenstein; Teleplay by : Debra Frank & Scott Rubenstein	November 26, 1980	306
Arnold wants a temporary housekeeper (Denise Nicholas) to become his, Willis' and Kimberly's new mother while Adelaide is away. When Adelaide returns early, Arnold inadvertently gives her the impression that she's being replaced permanently.
55	5	"The Accident"	Gerren Keith	Story by : Calvin Kelly and Howard Leeds & Ben Starr & Martin Cohan; Teleplay by : Howard Leeds & Ben Starr & Martin Cohan	December 3, 1980	307
56	6	"The Accident"	Gerren Keith	Story by : Calvin Kelly and Howard Leeds & Ben Starr & Martin Cohan; Teleplay by : Howard Leeds & Ben Starr & Martin Cohan	December 3, 1980	308
A trip to Disney World is canceled when Mr. Drummond is hospitalized after being hit by a drunk driver in a car crash and is rendered amnesiac. If he can't recover his memory, Mr. Drummond may lose all of his assets, as well as custody of his children, so his kids try to help him get his memory back. When he starts to remember details about Kimberly and not about Willis and Arnold, they decide to leave and go back to Harlem.
57	7	"Little Mother"	Gerren Keith	Ed Jurist	December 10, 1980	310
Kimberly's friend, Ellen Marshall (Kari Michaelsen), is pregnant and everyone thinks Kimberly is the one who is expecting.
58	8	"Football Father"	Gerren Keith	Sandy Veith and Donald Ross	December 17, 1980	304
Mr. Drummond bribes a hard-nosed football coach (Greg Mullavey) into letting Arnold join the team by buying new uniforms for them, but he regrets his decision when he finds out how the coach is motivating the kids. Note: This episode marks the first appearance of Le Tari as Dudley's adoptive father, Ted Ramsey.
59	9	"First Love"	Gerren Keith	Jerry Winnick	December 31, 1980	311
Mr. Drummond does not want Willis to see his girlfriend Charlene (Janet Jackson) because it is interfering with his schoolwork, so the two make secret arrangements to be together. Note: Janet Jackson makes her first appearance on the show as Charlene DuPrey.
60	10	"Count Your Blessings"	Gerren Keith	Marshall Goldberg	January 7, 1981	309
Arnold is heartbroken when he finds out he will not do much growing when he gets older, so Mr. Drummond arranges for a business associate's handicapped daughter (Melanie Watson, in her first of four appearances as Kathy) to show him how fortunate he really is.
61	11	"The Loan"	Gerren Keith	Story by : Mara Lideks; Teleplay by : Mara Lideks and Howard Leeds & Ben Starr & Martin Cohan	January 14, 1981	312
Arnold wants to help a young doorman (Tommy Aguilar) get started in business, so he loans him some money to bet on a sure thing in a horse race.
62	12	"Roots"	Gerren Keith	Story by : Kurt Taylor; Teleplay by : Kurt Taylor and John Donley & Howard Meyers	January 21, 1981	313
Willis' friends think that he and Arnold have lost touch with where they came from, so they adopt a more Afro-centric attitude and alienate the rest of the family.
63	13	"Junk Food Junkie" "The Junk Food"	Gerren Keith	Dawn Aldredge	January 28, 1981	314
Arnold is made to give up junk food, which is difficult, since his school has junk food vending machines and having them removed may hurt his chances at winning a school election. Note: Dody Goodman makes her first appearance as Mr. Drummond's sister, Sophia, who would make occasional appearances on the show during the third and fourth seasons.
64	14	"The Bus"	Gerren Keith	Glenn Padnick	February 4, 1981	315
Protesters threaten Arnold and his classmates when they become part of a school integration program.
65	15	"The Older Man"	Gerren Keith	Albert E. Lewin	February 25, 1981	316
Kimberly dons a wig for a class play and ends up getting a date with an older man (Lou Richards), so Arnold and Willis try to put a stop to it. Note: Lisa Whelchel and Mindy Cohn (from The Facts of Life) guest star as Blair and Natalie, respectively.
66	16	"Where There's Hope"	Gerren Keith	Story by : Walter E. Smith; Teleplay by : John Donley & Howard Meyers	March 4, 1981	317
Arnold is adamant about not wanting a pesky young girl (Monika Furness) at his birthday party, but things become serious when he finds out the girl is very sick, so he pays her a visit at the hospital to cheer her up.
67	17	"The Magician" "It's Magic"	Gerren Keith	Story by : Louis Smallwood & M. Martez Thomas; Teleplay by : Louis Smallwood & M. Martez Thomas and Ed Jurist & Gordon Mitchell	March 11, 1981	301
Arnold goes out on a limb--or, rather, a 30-story ledge--while trying to impress his family, a reporter, and football player Ed "Too Tall" Jones with his disappearing act. The result is more Harold Lloyd than Harry Houdini, and it doesn't help when Arnold suddenly remembers that he's terrified of heights.
68	18	"Drummond's Fair Lady"	Gerren Keith	Story by : Jeff Lewis and Sandy Veith; Teleplay by : Sandy Veith	March 18, 1981	319
Mr. Drummond recommends a woman (Wendy Fulton) for a position at his company, but runs into opposition from his coworkers because of her sex and his children, because they think she's using him to get the job.
69	19	"The Ancestors"	Gerren Keith	Story by : Calvin Kelly; Teleplay by : Ed Jurist and Calvin Kelly	March 25, 1981	320
Mr. Drummond finds out that his ancestor was a slave trader, which affects his plans to build a community center in Harlem.
70	20	"Almost American" "Night School"	Gerren Keith	Story by : Glenn Padnick and Warren Murray; Teleplay by : Howard Leeds & Ben Starr & Martin Cohan and Glenn Padnick	April 1, 1981	318
Mr. Drummond grounds Arnold for a bad grade on his history test. A student in an immigration and naturalization class (Rosalind Chao) becomes the suspect in a robbery. Notes: This episode was a backdoor pilot for a potential series focusing on the immigration and naturalization class; an adaptation of the British sit-com Mind Your Language. The series itself was never picked up, although later in 1986, Mind Your Language was adapted into the short-lived What a Country. The Drummonds have a very small role in this episode. Chao would later play Arnold's teacher, Miss Chung.
71	21	"Room for One More"	Gerren Keith	Fred S. Fox and Seaman Jacobs	May 6, 1981	321
Arnold tries to get Mr. Drummond to adopt Dudley when he finds out his foster father (Le Tari) may not be able to keep him.
72	22	"The Athlete"	Gerren Keith	Gordon Mitchell	May 13, 1981	324
A fast-talking baseball coach woos Willis for a high school team and uses expensive gifts and deception to attain his goal.: Recording date: April 17, 1981

=== Season 4 (1981–82) ===
No. overall	No. in season	Title	Directed by	Written by	Original release date	Prod. code
73	1	"Growing Up"	Gerren Keith	Debra Frank & Scott Rubenstein	October 29, 1981	322
With Arnold's help, Willis gets everyone out of the house so he and his girlfriend Charlene can make love for the first time. However, when the moment occurs, things don't go as smoothly as he expected.
74	2	"First Day Blues"	Gerren Keith	Bruce Taylor	November 5, 1981	402
Willis has trouble making friends at his new school, until it is discovered that his family is rich, so he gets asked to buy marijuana for a party. Notes: Gary Coleman does not appear in the episode. Kim Fields guest stars as Tootie. Clarence Gilyard appears as Frank Simpson, one of Willis' classmates.
75	3	"The Model"	Gerren Keith	Story by : Bill Shinkai; Teleplay by : John Donley & Howard Meyers and Bill Shinkai	November 12, 1981	323
Kimberly's job leads to her beginning a modeling career.
76	4	"The Team"	Gerren Keith	Glenn Padnick	November 19, 1981	403
Willis is upset when he doesn't make the basketball team because a white student (Todd Lookinland) takes his place, so he plans to take legal action. Notes: Gary Coleman does not appear in this episode, being temporarily absent due to a contract dispute. Kim Fields guest stars as Tootie, in part to cover for Arnold's absence, some of his dialogue being adapted for her.; Clarence Gilyard makes the second of his two appearances as "Frank Simpson".; Todd Lookinland is the brother of Mike, who portrayed "Bobby" on The Brady Bunch.
77	5	"The Big Heist"	Gerren Keith	Bruce Taylor	November 26, 1981	405
Arnold attempts to steal an expensive comic book (Amazing Spider-Man issue 14) to get into the Gooch's club and gets taken to court when he's caught.
78	6	"The Double Date" "Blind Date"	Gerren Keith	Jerry Winnick	December 3, 1981	406
Arnold gets his first date with a girl he likes, but things turn sour when Dudley butts in on them.
79	7	"The Ski Weekend"	Gerren Keith	Dawn Aldredge	December 10, 1981	401
Kimberly goes on a ski trip with her friend, but doesn't let the family know that there will be boys there. Mr. Drummond and Willis end up surprising her by paying an unannounced visit, but get surprised themselves when they see the boys.
80	8	"The Health Club"	Gerren Keith	Story by : Sheryl Levine; Teleplay by : Joe Bonaduce	December 17, 1981	407
Arnold and Willis try to get into Mr. Drummond's health club, but are turned away because they are black. When Drummond is honored by the club, a confrontation takes place.
81	9	"The Burial Ground"	Gerren Keith	Story by : Bernard Burnell Mack; Teleplay by : John Donley & Howard Meyers	January 7, 1982	409
Drummond's building project is discovered to be on the site of an Indian burial ground, which leads to a conflict with a member of the Indian tribe.
82	10	"Hello, Daddy" "Like Father, Like Son?"	Gerren Keith	Donald Ross	January 14, 1982	404
The son of a woman Mr. Drummond knew during the Korean War (Keone Young) shows up claiming that Mr. Drummond is his father. This leads to a reunion with the woman (Nobu McCarthy) and the truth about who the father really is. Notes: Due to Gary Coleman's temporary absence due to a contract dispute, Arnold appears briefly at the beginning and ending of the episode.
83	11	"Jilted"	Gerren Keith	Ed Jurist	January 21, 1982	408
When Charlene feels Willis is taking her for granted, she dumps him. Willis soon hears she's seeing another guy and he decides it is time to move on, but Arnold has plans to bring them back together.
84	12	"Dreams"	Gerren Keith	Kurt Taylor & Booker Bradshaw	January 28, 1982	412
Arnold begins having nightmares after he finds out Mr. Drummond is going on a business trip, so a therapist is needed to unlock Arnold's fears.
85	13	"Kathy"	Gerren Keith	Marshall Goldberg	February 4, 1982	411
Arnold gets reassurance from Kathy (Melanie Watson) when he plays Abraham Lincoln in a school play, but when he tries to get her to use her crutches instead of sitting in a wheelchair, she is furious and blows his confidence before showtime. Note: Rosalind Chao makes her first appearance as Miss Chung, the teacher of Arnold's class. (She had previously played a different character in the third season episode "Almost American")
86	14	"Fire"	Gerren Keith	Jill Gordon	February 11, 1982	413
A fire has the family trapped in the building and when smoke starts coming through the vents, it makes everyone think the end is near.
87	15	"The Squatter"	Gerren Keith	Story by : Shelley Landau & Jane Gould; Teleplay by : Danny Simon	February 18, 1982	410
A woman (Audrey Meadows) becomes a squatter in the Drummonds' house after she is forced out of her apartment due to a condominium conversion Mr. Drummond is involved with.
88	16	"The Car"	Gerren Keith	Warren Murray	February 25, 1982	414
Willis takes the car out without Mr. Drummond's permission in order to pick up Charlene for a date and gets in trouble when he hits a police officer's motorcycle.
89	17	"Crime Story: Part 1" "Crime in the Schools: Part 1"	Gerren Keith	Howard Leeds & Ben Starr & Martin Cohan	March 11, 1982	415
Arnold and Dudley are harassed by two bullies who force them to hand over their lunch and money. Willis decides to interfere and gets more than he bargained for. Note: Shannon Presby, who co-starred in The New Kids, portrays one of the bullies.
90	18	"Crime Story: Part 2" "Crime in the Schools: Part 2"	Gerren Keith	Howard Leeds & Ben Starr & Martin Cohan	March 18, 1982	416
After Willis is hospitalized for trying to stop the bullies, Arnold is asked to participate in a sting operation to nab them. When Mr. Drummond refuses to allow this, Arnold takes matters into his own hands, as he feels responsible for Willis being hospitalized.
91	19	"B.M.O.C."	Gerren Keith	Robert Jayson & A. Dudley Johnson, Jr.	March 25, 1982	417
Willis lets his potential membership in an exclusive club go to his head, but falls hard when he alienates the club members.
92	20	"Green Hair"	Gerren Keith	Albert E. Lewin	April 1, 1982	418
Kimberly's hair turns green before a date, due to using a copper bowl affected by acid rain to wash her hair, which gets the Drummond family talking about how to help the environment.
93	21	"Have I Got a Girl for You"	Gerren Keith	Story by : Howard Leeds & Ben Starr & Martin Cohan; Teleplay by : Dawn Aldredge	April 8, 1982	419
Mr. Drummond has a good time going out with a hairdresser (Candy Azzara), but when he doesn't invite her to a posh party, she feels like he is secretly embarrassed by her.
94	22	"Lifesavers"	Gerren Keith	Story by : Jim Tisdale; Teleplay by : Ed Jurist	April 15, 1982	420
Willis saves Arnold's life, so Arnold feels obligated to dote on him constantly. In order to get Arnold off his back, he sets up a fake robbery at his job so Arnold can save him and even the score. When Arnold finds out what Willis is up to, he decides to have a little fun with the "robber," not knowing that a real robber has come to hold up the place.
95	23	"Stress? What Stress?"	Gerren Keith	Glenn Padnick	April 22, 1982	421
Willis finds out he has very high stress levels, so Mr. Drummond wants him to lay off on his extracurricular activities, much to Willis' chagrin.
96	24	"The Music Man"	Gerren Keith	Larry Rhine	May 6, 1982	422
Willis joins a musical group and wants Charlene to join as well, but Kimberly ends up impressing his bandmates so much that they want her in the group instead.
97	25	"Short But Sweet"	Gerren Keith	Howard Leeds & Ben Starr & Martin Cohan	May 13, 1982	424
Arnold isn't interested in celebrating his birthday because he feels girls aren't interested in him, particularly one girl he really likes, but things change when he invites the girl to his party. However, his intentions aren't made clear and she comes to the party with someone else. Note: This is the last episode featuring Nedra Volz as Adelaide.
98	26	"On Your Toes"	Gerren Keith	Albert E. Lewin	May 20, 1982	423
Arnold attends Kimberly's ballet recital and decides he wants to learn ballet, which makes Willis very uncomfortable and he tries to put a stop to it. Note: Roger C. Carmel guest stars.

=== Season 5 (1982–83) ===
No. overall	No. in season	Title	Directed by	Written by	Original release date	Prod. code
99	1	"Shoot-Out at the O.K. Arcade"	Gerren Keith	Story by : Howard Leeds, Martin Cohan & Blake Hunter; Teleplay by : Howard Leeds & Martin Cohan	October 2, 1982	0501
Arnold tries to beat Willis' score on an arcade game, but constant playing takes a toll on his schoolwork.
100	2	"In the Swim"	Gerren Keith	Story by : Blake Hunter, Howard Leeds & Martin Cohan; Teleplay by : Blake Hunter	October 9, 1982	0502
Kimberly transfers to Willis' school and faces resistance when she tries to join the all-male swim team. Notes: Mary Jo Catlett makes her first appearance as Pearl Gallagher, the third and final housekeeper. Catlett appears in most remaining episodes of the series and is added to the opening billed cast during the following season.; Duke Stroud, as the chauvenistic swim team-coach, is best known for portraying Air Boss Johnson ("I want some butts!") in Top Gun.
101	3	"Cyrano De Jackson"	Gerren Keith	Paul Robinson Hunter	October 16, 1982	0504
Arnold tries to help Dudley woo classmate Lisa Hayes (Nikki Swasey), but the plan backfires when Lisa thinks that Arnold is the one who likes her. Note: First episode to feature Arnold's classmate Lisa. However, despite being sweet on Arnold in this episode, subsequent appearances portray them as enemies.
102	4	"Big Brother"	Gerren Keith	Bruce Taylor	October 23, 1982	0503
Arnold's classmate (Joey Lawrence) receives attention from the Drummond family, leaving Arnold feeling unwanted. Note: Huntz Hall guest stars.
103	5	"The Peacemaker"	Gerren Keith	Don Segall	October 30, 1982	0506
Willis tries to negotiate between two rival groups of students at his school but becomes the prime suspect in a theft and obtains a gun to protect himself.
104	6	"Substitute Teacher"	Gerren Keith	Robert Jayson & A. Dudley Johnson, Jr.	November 6, 1982	0505
Arnold and Dudley play pranks on a tough substitute teacher (Kareem Abdul-Jabbar).
105	7	"The Older Woman"	Gerren Keith	Debra Frank & Scott Rubenstein	November 13, 1982	0507
Willis wears a fake mustache to gain admittance to a club and dates the older waitress (Shari Belafonte).
106	8	"A Case of Overexposure" "Overexposure"	Gerren Keith	Story by : Bob Peete & Sandy Fries; Teleplay by : Bob Peete	November 20, 1982	0509
Kimberly submits a candid photo of Arnold's backside into a contest.
107	9	"Memories"	Gerren Keith	Story by : Howard Meyers, Paul Haggis & Brian K. Moody; Teleplay by : Howard Meyers & Paul Haggis	November 27, 1982	0508
Arnold is saddened to hear his mother's (Betty A. Bridges, Todd Bridges' real-life mother) voice on an old audio tape and pretends to lose it.
108	10	"Push Comes to Shove"	Gerren Keith	Richard Eckhaus	December 4, 1982	0510
After Arnold's confrontation with the son of the new building manager, Mr. Drummond punches the manager (William G. Schilling) and almost causes the family to be evicted.
109	11	"The Executives"	Gerren Keith	Albert E. Lewin	December 11, 1982	0511
Arnold, Kimberly and Willis take jobs at Mr. Drummond's company but Willis discovers that minorities may not have equal opportunities there.
110	12	"Santa's Helper"	Gerren Keith	Bruce Taylor	December 18, 1982	0512
Arnold helps a street-corner Santa Claus (Garrett Morris), who takes advantage of the Drummonds' kindness by robbing them.
111	13	"A Growing Problem"	Gerren Keith	Ed Jurist	January 8, 1983	0513
After a fight with Mr. Drummond about drinking, Willis moves out and ends up in a car crash.
112	14	"Parents Have Rights Too"	Gerren Keith	Martin Cohan	January 15, 1983	0514
Pearl and the kids return early from a camping trip, but Mr. Drummond's love interest (Louise Sorel) is spending the weekend at the penthouse.
113	15	"Independent Woman"	Gerren Keith	John Donley	January 22, 1983	0515
Kimberly's boss uses her romantically to advance in Mr. Drummond's company, but Arnold discovers the truth and tells Kimberly.
114	16	"The Bicycle Man: Part 1"	Gerren Keith	Blake Hunter	February 5, 1983	0516
Arnold and Dudley befriend a bicycle shop owner named Mr. Horton (Gordon Jump), a pedophile seeking new victims. Note: The show begins with a message by Conrad Bain advising families to watch the episode together and then discuss the topic of child molestation.
115	17	"The Bicycle Man: Part 2"	Gerren Keith	Blake Hunter	February 12, 1983	0517
After watching a pornographic cartoon at the bicycle shop, Arnold leaves Dudley behind and Mr. Drummond calls the authorities. The police save Dudley in the nick of time. Note: Conrad Bain delivers another message about child molestation at the beginning of the episode and also delivers a voiceover announcement before the end credits, saying "If you know of a problem with child sexual abuse, please contact your local law enforcement or social service agency."
116	18	"Family On Ice"	Gerren Keith	Story by : Jennifer Burton Kurtz & Mitchell Wayne Cohen; Teleplay by : Bruce Taylor	February 19, 1983	0518
After impressing professional skater Dorothy Hamill, Kimberly is overwhelmed by the hard work involved in becoming a professional skater. Note: Dana Plato, who plays Kimberly, had abandoned a figure skating career in favor of acting.
117	19	"Hall Monitor"	Gerren Keith	Marshall Goldberg	March 12, 1983	0519
Kathy transfers to Arnold's school and is treated poorly because of her disability, also drawing scorn for her heavy-handed approach to her position as hall monitor.
118	20	"The Cricket"	Gerren Keith	Story by : Bill Shinkai; Teleplay by : Howard Meyers & Paul Haggis	March 26, 1983	0520
After Arnold's lucky cricket escapes, he must devise a backup plan to avoid trouble with the Gooch.
119	21	"The Roommates"	Gerren Keith	Howard Leeds	April 9, 1983	0521
Mr. Drummond trades rooms with Willis, who is busy studying for exams.
120	22	"The Reporter"	Gerren Keith	Story by : Jennifer Burton Kurtz, Sheila Scott & Diane Schroeder; Teleplay by : Mitchell Wayne Cohen	April 30, 1983	0522
Arnold discovers that drugs are being sold at his school and reports it to the newspaper, prompting a visit by First Lady Nancy Reagan, who visits the Drummond home and speaks to Arnold's class about the dangers of drugs.: Recording date: March 10, 1983
121	23	"Romeo and Juliet"	Dolores Ferraro	Robert Jayson & A. Dudley Johnson, Jr.	May 7, 1983	0523
Arnold is tricked into playing Romeo opposite Lisa's Juliet in a class play, but Lisa has a serious case of stage fright.
122	24	"My Fair Larry" "My Fair Lady"	Gerren Keith	John Donley & Bruce Taylor	May 14, 1983	0524
Willis' classmate Larry (Andrew Dice Clay) wants to secure a date with a girl at school (Jami Gertz) but instead falls for Kimberly.

=== Season 6 (1983–84) ===
No. overall	No. in season	Title	Directed by	Written by	Original release date	Prod. code
123	1	"Mr. T and Mr. t" "The Idol"	Gerren Keith	Story by : Howard Leeds, Blake Hunter, Martin Cohan & David W. Duclon; Teleplay by : Bruce Taylor	October 1, 1983	0606
When an episode of The A-Team is filmed in the Drummonds' apartment, Arnold has to compete with Mr. T for the affection of Dudley's cousin Angela, so Arnold tries to turn himself into a mini Mr. T, with embarrassing results.
124	2	"The Goat"	Gerren Keith	Robert Jayson & A. Dudley Johnson, Jr.	October 15, 1983	0603
When Arnold is given the cold shoulder from teachers and classmates at his new school, he concocts a plan to steal the school mascot and pretend to rescue it to get some positive attention, but he gets in trouble with the family when the goat gets loose in the apartment.
125	3	"Rashomon II"	Gerren Keith	Howard Meyers	October 22, 1983	0601
A burglar (Terry Kiser) holds the family hostage in the apartment, but is knocked out and arrested. Mr. Drummond, Willis and Arnold all have different interpretations of what happened, but Pearl, who was in the kitchen and saw everything, tells Kimberly what really took place. Note: The episode title and plot device of the story are inspired by the movie Rashomon.
126	4	"The Lie"	Gerren Keith	John Donley & Clay Graham	October 29, 1983	0604
Willis lies to Arnold about knowing first aid in order to get a job at the school carnival, but when Arnold gets an electrical shock, Willis doesn't know how to save him. He later confesses to Arnold what happened and Arnold is angry when he finds out the truth.
127	5	"Drafted"	Gerren Keith	Dawn Aldredge	November 12, 1983	0608
A computer error leads to Arnold getting mail to sign up with the Selective Service System, even though he is too young. When Mr. Drummond complains, he is visited by the authorities, leading Arnold to think he will be drafted.
128	6	"The Van Drummonds"	Gerren Keith	Paul Haggis	November 19, 1983	0609
Mr. Drummond's cousin Anna (Bonar Bain, Conrad Bain's identical twin brother) and her son Hans (Dana Plato in a dual role) visit the family. As soon as they arrive, Hans starts causing trouble and blames Arnold and Willis for it.
129	7	"The Moonlighter"	Gerren Keith	Story by : Rosemary Lee Potter and Phil Margo & Jack Gross; Teleplay by : Phil Margo & Jack Gross	November 26, 1983	0611
Arnold finds out his favorite teacher (Jayne Kennedy) is moonlighting at a gentlemen's club and sneaks into the club to find out if it is true.
130	8	"Coming of Age"	Gerren Keith	Dawn Aldredge	December 3, 1983	0605
Kimberly finds out she'll be getting a trust fund on her 18th birthday and has plans to travel to Europe. When Mr. Drummond refuses to support her decision and threatens to keep the money from her until she's older, Kimberly plans to work as an au pair for a European family.
131	9	"Assert Yourself"	Gerren Keith	Story by : Howard Leeds, Blake Hunter & Martin Cohan; Teleplay by : Tim O'Donnell	December 10, 1983	0607
Arnold plans to have Dudley run for class president so he can control him behind the scenes. When Arnold sees that Dudley isn't doing things the way he wants him to, he decides to run against him. In the end, both lose out to a third candidate.
132	10	"Mrs. Z"	Gerren Keith	Al Lewin	December 17, 1983	0610
After Mr. Drummond becomes the target of an extortionist, he hires an imposing female bodyguard (Sheron Chambers) to protect his family.
133	11	"The Senior Class Queen"	Gerren Keith	Bernard Burnell Mack	January 7, 1984	0613
When Kimberly tries to get into Willis' all-male letterman's club at school, he gets back at her by becoming a contestant in the school's beauty pageant.
134	12	"Where's There's Smoke"	Gerren Keith	Bruce Taylor	January 14, 1984	0602
When Arnold and Dudley are caught smoking cigarettes in a bid to impress their "cool" classmates, there are no ifs or ands or butts...they're grounded. Taking this especially hard is Dudley's father Ted, a long-time smoker from whom Dudley has been sneaking packs...and who, more recently, has lost a lung to cancer.
135	13	"Drummond's Lady"	Gerren Keith	Story by : Howard Leeds, Blake Hunter & Martin Cohan; Teleplay by : Howard Leeds, Howard Meyers & Mark Miller	January 21, 1984	0615
Mr. Drummond tries to make a business deal with exercise instructor Maggie McKinney (Dixie Carter) and falls in love with her. Note: This is Carter's first appearance as Maggie McKinney (later Maggie McKinney-Drummond), who appeared as a recurring character in this season, and is added to the opening billed cast in the following season.
136	14	"The Hitchhikers: Part 1"	Gerren Keith	Glenn Padnick & Sydney Julien	January 28, 1984	0616
Arnold and Kimberly hitchhike to get home for Mr. Drummond's birthday party and are picked up by a man (Woody Eney) who takes them to his apartment and tries to have his way with Kimberly. Note: This episode begins with an introduction from Conrad Bain, who urges children and their parents to discuss the dangers of hitchhiking.
137	15	"The Hitchhikers: Part 2"	Gerren Keith	Glenn Padnick & Sydney Julien	February 4, 1984	0617
Arnold escapes from the kidnapper and makes it home, but leaves Kimberly behind and can't remember where she is. A policeman helps Arnold remember by hypnotizing him and getting him to reveal the license plate number of the kidnapper so the police can track him down to arrest him. After the police arrested the man, Kimberly and Arnold have reunited with the family and to celebrate Mr. Drummond's birthday party. Note: Conrad Bain again delivers a message at the beginning, urging children and their parents to discuss the dangers of hitchhiking and does a voiceover announcement at the end, saying "If you know of a case of sexual assault or an attempted sexual assault, please contact your local law enforcement agency or emergency medical facility."
138	16	"Hooray for Hollywood: Part 1"	Gerren Keith & Leslie H. Martinson	Howard Leeds, Blake Hunter & Martin Cohan	February 11, 1984	0618
Mr. Drummond travels to Hollywood and proposes to Maggie and finds out she has a young son named Sam (Danny Cooksey). Meanwhile, Arnold and Dudley try to meet the star of Knight Rider (David Hasselhoff) and sneak into a car on the set that's about to be blown up. Note: An un-billed Jonathan Harris is the voice of "Frankenstein's Creature". This is Cooksey's first appearance as Sam McKinney, Maggie's 6-year-old son; he appears in all remaining episodes of the series, and is added to the opening billed cast for the final two seasons.
139	17	"Hooray for Hollywood: Part 2"	Gerren Keith & Leslie H. Martinson	Story by : Howard Leeds, Blake Hunter & Martin Cohan; Teleplay by : Bruce Taylor	February 18, 1984	0619
David Hasselhoff rescues Arnold and Dudley just in time and the rest of the family find out about Mr. Drummond's marriage plans. Arnold is less than thrilled, especially when he finds out he's getting a new little brother as part of the deal.
140	18	"The Wedding" "Drummond's Wedding"	Gerren Keith	Howard Meyers & Mark Miller	February 25, 1984	0620
141	19	"The Wedding" "Drummond's Wedding"	Gerren Keith	Story by : Ifa Baeza; Teleplay by : Dawn Aldredge & Judith Bustany	February 25, 1984	0621
Arrangements are being made for the wedding between Mr. Drummond and Maggie and Maggie becomes furious when she finds out that Mr. Drummond's lawyer suggested a pre-nuptial agreement. The wedding is about to take place, until Maggie and Mr. Drummond realize that neither of them called anybody to perform the ceremony. Note: Wedding guests include Mrs. Garrett, Adelaide, and Aunt Sophia, all of whom hadn't appeared on the show for some time prior to this episode. This is also the only time in which Mr. Drummond's current and previous housekeepers all appear together. Additionally, Drummond's lawyer and friend Tom Bishop, Willis' girlfriend Charlene, Dudley, and Dudley's father Ted all appear in this episode, resulting in the highest number of recurring guest characters seen within a single episode of the series.
142	20	"The Honeymoon's Over"	Gerren Keith	Story by : Howard Leeds, Blake Hunter & Martin Cohen; Teleplay by : Robert Jayson & A. Dudley Johnson, Jr.	March 3, 1984	0622
Mr. Drummond and Maggie return from their honeymoon and find out that Arnold had been taking advantage of Sam while they were away.
143	21	"The Bar Mitzvah Boy"	Linda Day	Martin Cohan	March 17, 1984	0623
When Arnold loses interest in attending church, he tries to find a religion more to his liking, so he decides to convert to Judaism, but is convinced otherwise by a rabbi (Milton Berle).
144	22	"Kathy's Olympics"	Ellen Chaset Falcon	Story by : Bobby Herbeck; Teleplay by : Robert Jayson & A. Dudley Johnson, Jr.	March 24, 1984	0624
Arnold is in charge of keeping donations for a fundraising drive at school, but loses the money when he puts it in an old pair of shoes that gets thrown out, so the rest of the family has to dig through the garbage to find them. Fortunately for Arnold, Sam saved the shoes and money from being thrown away.
145	23	"The Houseguest"	Gerren Keith	Bruce Taylor	May 5, 1984	0612
After an argument with her father, Charlene moves in with the Drummonds and ends up fighting with Willis. Note: This is Janet Jackson's final appearance as Charlene DuPrey.
146	24	"The Boyfriend"	Gerren Keith	Story by : Howard Leeds, Blake Hunter & Martin Cohan; Teleplay by : Ifa Baeza, Bruce Taylor, Howard Meyers & Mark Miller	May 12, 1984	0614
Kimberly plans to move in with her boyfriend, whom her dad doesn't like, by tricking the family into thinking she's moving in with her girlfriend, Michelle (Dana Kimmell) instead. Note: This is Dana Plato's final appearance as a regular cast member; starting in the seventh season, Plato becomes a recurring guest star.

=== Season 7 (1984–85) ===
No. overall	No. in season	Title	Directed by	Written by	Original release date	Prod. code
147	1	"A Haunting We Will Go"	Gerren Keith	Ken Hecht & Bob Brunner	September 29, 1984	0708
In this takeoff on Ghostbusters, Arnold and Sam explore the haunted former residence of a reclusive inventor. Notes: Starting this season, Danny Cooksey and Dixie Carter join the cast as regular cast members.; John Astin and Ray Bolger guest star. Bolger died three years later, and this was his final television appearance.
148	2	"Arnold and Lisa's Mother"	Gerren Keith	Robert Jayson & A. Dudley Johnson, Jr.	October 6, 1984	0706
Lisa's mother is Arnold's new teacher, so Lisa forces Arnold and his friends to be nice to her. But when Arnold learns that Lisa's mother doesn't like snitching, he sabotages Lisa's science project as revenge.
149	3	"Bed-Wetting"	Gerren Keith	Bruce Taylor	October 13, 1984	0701
Sam develops a bedwetting problem and the family begins showing him more attention, which bothers Arnold.
150	4	"Undercover Lover"	Gerren Keith	Story by : Susan Kessler & Maria Alexander; Teleplay by : Ken Hecht & Bob Brunner	October 20, 1984	0703
Willis' new girlfriend (Anne-Marie Johnson) is actually an undercover cop trying to bust drug dealers at school.
151	5	"Arnold's Strike" "The Strike"	Gerren Keith	Howard Meyers	October 27, 1984	0704
Arnold and his classmates protest dress-code changes at school, but when the principal (Dick Sargent) threatens suspension, Arnold is the only one willing to stand for his beliefs.
152	6	"Sam's Father"	Gerren Keith	Dan Kennicott & Michael Curley	November 3, 1984	0710
Maggie's ex-husband (Hoyt Axton) wants Sam to stay with him instead of with the Drummonds.
153	7	"Carmella Meets the Gooch"	Gerren Keith	Story by : Bruce Taylor, Bob Brunner & Ken Hecht; Teleplay by : Bruce Taylor	November 10, 1984	0711
Foreign exchange student Carmella feuds with Arnold, develops a crush on Willis and helps Sam fight the Gooch.
154	8	"Arnold the Entrepreneur"	Gerren Keith	John B. Collins	November 17, 1984	0713
Arnold and Sam go into business selling roach spray, but Arnold's greed causes Sam to go his own way. Note: Hervé Villechaize and Edie McClurg guest star.
155	9	"The Honorable Arnold J. Jackson"	Mel Ferber	Dan Kennicott & Michael Curley	November 24, 1984	0707
In student court, Arnold must judge between his friend Robbie and a girl whom he likes.
156	10	"The Gymnasts"	Gerren Keith	Bob Brunner & Ken Hecht	December 1, 1984	0714
After watching gymnasts from the 1984 Summer Olympics, Willis' friend, a paralyzed athlete, becomes despondent. Note: Gary Coleman does not appear in this episode.
157	11	"Tonsils"	Mel Ferber	Bruce Taylor	December 8, 1984	0705
Sam and Drummond both face the prospect of surgery.
158	12	"Arnold's Songbird"	Gerren Keith	Story by : Bruce Taylor, Bob Brunner & Ken Hecht; Teleplay by : Bruce Taylor	December 15, 1984	0712
Arnold has to ask Carmella for help when his plans for a school fundraiser fall apart.
159	13	"Baseball Blues"	Gerren Keith	Robert Jayson & A. Dudley Johnson, Jr.	January 5, 1985	0716
Drummond manages Sam's baseball team but leaves Sam on the bench feeling betrayed. Willis angles for an expensive new car. Note: Baseball player Lance Parrish guest-stars. Gary Coleman does not appear in this episode.
160	14	"Arnold Saves the Squirrel"	Mel Ferber	Toni Wunsch & Max Katz	January 12, 1985	0709
Arnold and Sam try to prevent the removal of a children's television show from the air. Note: Chuck McCann guest stars as Sam the Squirrel.
161	15	"Sam Adopts a Grandparent"	Gerren Keith	Susan H. Lee and Sylvia Alan	January 19, 1985	0715
After Sam's encounter with an irascible senior citizen (John McIntire), Drummond tries to play peacemaker. Note: Stephen Dorff and Troy Slaten play a couple of Sam's troopmates.
162	16	"Happy Birthday Drummond"	Gerren Keith	Jack Gross, Jr. & Phil Margo	January 26, 1985	0718
The boys try to please Drummond by proposing to take his last name, but a visit to the old neighborhood in Harlem gives them second thoughts. Note: Dana Plato returns to the series after a 15-week maternity leave.
163	17	"Sam's New Pal"	Gerren Keith	Ken Hecht & Bob Brunner	February 2, 1985	0717
Sam's new tomboy friend (Soleil Moon Frye) stays the night for a sleepover, which makes both of their fathers nervous. Note: Ron Masak guest stars.
164	18	"Russian Embassy"	Gerren Keith	Story by : Max Katz & Toni Wunsch; Teleplay by : Jose Rivera	February 9, 1985	0719
Arnold's toy rocket crash-lands at the Russian embassy and nearly causes an international incident.
165	19	"Cheers to Arnold"	Lee Lochhead	Bruce Taylor	February 16, 1985	0720
Arnold is pressured to drink by his alcoholic friend Ricky (Robert Jayne) and tries to get him help for his addiction.
166	20	"A Camping We Will Go"	Lee Shallat Chemel	Bruce Taylor	February 23, 1985	0721
Drummond takes Sam and Arnold camping but is unable to compete with Sam's more experienced father.
167	21	"Beauty Is in the Eye of Arnold"	Selig Frank	Robert Jayson & A. Dudley Johnson, Jr.	March 2, 1985	0722
Arnold feels peer pressure to dump a nice girl for a pretty cheerleader.
168	22	"Blue Collar Drummond"	Gerren Keith	Robert Jayson & A. Dudley Johnson, Jr.	March 9, 1985	0702
Drummond goes undercover at his company to find out how his employees really feel about working there. Note: This is Dixie Carter's final appearance as Maggie. Note: Barney Martin, Jack Riley, Lee Weaver, Ron Karabatsos, and Spice Williams-Crosby guest star.
169	23	"Street Smarts"	Gerren Keith	Story by : Gary Coleman; Teleplay by : Bruce Taylor	March 23, 1985	0723
After Arnold is mugged and begins carrying a knife with him, a crime-prevention demonstration at his school becomes too real for him. Note: Mary Jo Catlett does not appear in this episode.
170	24	"A Special Friend"	Gerren Keith	Ken Hecht & Bob Brunner	May 4, 1985	0724
After Arnold and Sam's new friend Karen (Lori Lethin) has an epileptic seizure, they make jokes about her, but Pearl reveals that she too is epileptic. Notes: Dana Plato guest stars. This is the final episode airing on NBC. Dixie Carter left the series at the end of this season and was replaced by Mary Ann Mobley in the final season.

=== Season 8 (1985–86) ===
No. overall	No. in season	Title	Directed by	Written by	Original release date	Prod. code
171	1	"Sam's Missing"	Gerren Keith	Ken Hecht & Bob Brunner	September 27, 1985	0804
172	2	"Sam's Missing"	Gerren Keith	Richard Gurman	September 27, 1985	0805
Royce D. Applegate portrays family man Donald Brown, whose wife (Ronne Troup) and he have never recovered from the death of their son. Accordingly, he kidnaps Sam as a replacement, while he is shopping for snacks at the grocery store. Telling his family that Sam was rescued from the streets, Donald tells Sam that he'll kill Sam's parents if Sam doesn't cooperate. During the middle of a home makeover, the Drummonds learn of Sam's kidnapping and they distribute flyers and go on the news to raise awareness. Maggie unravels emotionally. Mr. Drummond offers a $50,000 reward, which an extortionist attempts to claim. Meanwhile, Donald becomes more and more distant from his wife and son, trying to prevent them from learning that Sam was not found but stolen. Sam calls his family and gives them the Browns' phone number, which the police trace to Sam's location. They arrest Donald, and Sam returns home.: Notes: Dana Plato guest stars.; This is the first episode to air on ABC.; Mary Ann Mobley joins the cast, replacing Dixie Carter as "Maggie".
173	3	"Bully for Arnold"	Gerren Keith	Robert Jayson & A. Dudley Johnson, Jr.	October 4, 1985	0802
A tough guy (Forest Whitaker) wants Arnold to take care of his girlfriend while he is away, but the girl develops feelings for Arnold. Note: Jason Hervey makes his first appearance as Arnold's friend, Charlie.
174	4	"Love on the Run"	Gerren Keith	Jose Rivera	October 11, 1985	0801
Mr. Drummond and Maggie are too busy to spend time together, which has Sam worried that their marriage may be in trouble, so he and Arnold put together a romantic evening for the two of them. Note: Dana Plato guest stars.
175	5	"Willis Goes to College"	Tony Singletary	Richard Gurman	October 18, 1985	0807
Willis has a hard time adjusting to college, so he decides to drop out. However, he changes his mind when he finds out he's not the only one having trouble adjusting.
176	6	"Arnold's Job"	Gerren Keith	Ken Hecht & Bob Brunner	October 25, 1985	0803
Arnold hopes to become a photojournalist and ends up getting a job at a newspaper, but he becomes disillusioned when he's asked to run errands instead of taking pictures.
177	7	"A Tale of Two Teachers"	Gerren Keith	Richard Gurman	November 8, 1985	0808
Kareem Abdul-Jabbar returns and has Arnold take over teaching the class for one day. Arnold isn't thrilled about the assignment at first, but after reading the assigned book (A Tale of Two Cities), he gets excited about the opportunity. His classmates, however, give him a hard time.
178	8	"So You Want to Be a Rock Star"	Mel Ferber	Al Aidekman & Barry Rubinowitz	November 15, 1985	0810
Arnold tries to impress a girl by organizing his friends into a rock group, and by learning the saxophone himself. He even recruits Sam as lead vocalist (since Robbie, the only other member with singing experience, makes Alfalfa Switzer sound like Freddie Mercury). Yet the more Arnold practices, the worse he sounds; after a couple of rehearsals, his friends are ready to throw him out of his own band. Note: Musician Clarence Clemons guest stars.
179	9	"Speak No Evil"	Gerren Keith	Glenn Padnick	November 29, 1985	0809
Arnold and his friends find out that a white-supremacist group will be speaking on campus, so they decide to interrupt their assembly by throwing rotten food at them. When Mr. Drummond finds out, he objects to Arnold's behavior, saying the group has as much right to speak as everyone else because of the First Amendment. This leads to the rest of the family choosing sides, but soon Arnold comes around and sees things his dad's way.
180	10	"Arnold's Bad Rep"	Mel Ferber	Story by : Robert Jayson & A. Dudley Johnson, Jr. Teleplay by : Jose Rivera	December 6, 1985	0812
Arnold lies to his friends about having sex with a girl, which leads to her deciding to have sex for real... which Arnold isn't ready for.
181	11	"It's My Party and I'll Cry If I Want To"	Gerren Keith	Al Aidekman	December 13, 1985	0806
Sam manages to get a popular children's show host for his birthday party, but is disappointed when his friends are more interested in the guest than him.
182	12	"Arnold's Initiation"	Tony Singletary	Robert Jayson & A. Dudley Johnson, Jr.	January 10, 1986	0813
Arnold pulls a prank at the local burger place in order to get into a club, but his prank causes a mentally challenged worker (John Schuck) to get fired, so Arnold tries to make things right. Note: Moosie Drier plays John, one of the club members.
183	13	"Bulimia"	Barbara Schultz	Story by : Janna Lowell; Teleplay by : Ken Hecht & Bob Brunner	January 17, 1986	0811
Arnold gets blamed when food starts disappearing from the house, but he soon discovers that Kimberly, who has developed bulimia, is the one who has been eating all the food in the house. Note: This is Dana Plato's final appearance in the series as Kimberly Drummond. Note: Todd Bridges does not appear in this episode.
184	14	"Sam's Big Brother"	Mel Ferber	Susan H. Lee	January 24, 1986	0814
Sam begins to hang out with Willis a lot more than with Arnold, making Arnold feel left out. Meanwhile, Mr. Drummond is enthusiastic about seeing Halley's Comet with the family, but the brotherly feud almost ruins the occasion.
185	15	"Arnold's Tangled Web"	Selig Frank	Barry Rubinowitz	January 31, 1986	0815
Arnold enlists a hustler (Chick Vennera) to help him conceal a poor grade from Mr. Drummond, but the ruse becomes increasingly tricky to maintain.
186	16	"Lifestyles of the Poor and Unknown"	Mel Ferber	Barry Gold	February 7, 1986	0816
Sam gets into a fight at Hamburger Hangar with Kurt, a kid (Carl Steven) who constantly picks on him. Sam later learns that Kurt is a foster child, and is very jealous of what Sam has. Note: This is Mary Ann Mobley's final appearance in the series as Maggie McKinney.
187	17	"The Big Bribe"	Mel Ferber	Story by : Janna Lowell; Teleplay by : Robert Jayson & A. Dudley Johnson, Jr.	February 21, 1986	0817
Willis gets the sister of one of his old girlfriends (Robin Givens) to go out with Arnold by giving her concert tickets. When Arnold finds out, he is angry at what Willis did, but it turns out the girl likes Arnold for real. Note: This is Todd Bridges' final appearance in the series as Willis Jackson.
188	18	"The Photo Club"	Jeremiah Morris	Robert Jayson & A. Dudley Johnson, Jr.	February 28, 1986	0818
Arnold and Lisa get stuck working together on a school assignment and get locked in their school's darkroom. This leads to the two of them coming to an understanding about their adversarial relationship and they both end up liking each other, but it doesn't last. Note: This is Mary Jo Catlett's final appearance in the series as Pearl Gallagher.
189	19	"The Front Page"	Gerren Keith	Al Aidekman & Richard Gurman	March 7, 1986	0819
Arnold finds out that several athletes at school are using anabolic steroids, so he goes undercover to expose the full story. Notes: Peter DeLuise portrays the sole sympathetic jock.; Final episode of the series to be broadcast.

== See also ==
- List of Hello, Larry episodes
- List of The Facts of Life episodes
