= Three for the Road (TV series) =

American drama television series

- Genre: Drama
- Created by: Jerry McNeely
- Directed by: Bernard McEveety; Hy Averback; Barry Crane
- Starring: Alex Rocco; Vincent Van Patten; Leif Garrett
- Composers: David Shire; James Di Pasquale
- Country of origin: United States
- Original language: English
- No. of seasons: 1
- No. of episodes: 13

Production
- Executive producer: Jerry McNeely
- Producers: John G. Stephens; Bill Phillips
- Running time: 60 minutes
- Production company: MTM Enterprises

Original release
- Network: CBS
- Release: September 14 – November 30, 1975

Three for the Road is an American drama television series that aired on CBS from September 14 to November 30, 1975. The series follows two brothers and their recently widowed father, who travel around the country in an RV. Three for the Road was the first 60-minute dramatic production by MTM Enterprises.

What is notable about Three for the Road is that after its cancellation, the newsmagazine 60 Minutes was moved into the Sundays-at-7 timeslot that Three for the Road had occupied (60 Minutes has continued to occupy that timeslot as of the 2023–2024 broadcast season). Also, Three for the Road would ultimately finish with the lowest ratings out of 97 shows that aired during the 1975–1976 American broadcast season.

== Cast ==
- Alex Rocco as Pete Karras
- Vincent Van Patten as John Karras
- Leif Garrett as Endy Karras

== Episodes ==
No.	Title	Directed by	Written by	Original release date	Prod. code
0	"Pilot"	Boris Sagal	Jerry McNeely	September 4, 1975	5202
1	"Fear"	Barry Crane	Dick Bensfield & Perry Grant	September 14, 1975	5258
2	"Match Point"	Bernard McEveety	Jerry McNeely	September 21, 1975	5253
3	"The Ghost Story"	Barry Crane	William Kelley	September 28, 1975	5262
4	"Ride on a Red Balloon"	Claudio Guzmán	Jerry McNeely	October 5, 1975	5263
5	"The Fugitives"	Bernard McEveety	Del Reisman & Perry Grant & Dick Bensfield	October 12, 1975	5255
6	"The Cave"	Barry Crane	Jack Turley	October 19, 1975	5266
7	"The Rip-Off"	Claudio Guzmán	Arnold & Lois Peyser	October 26, 1975	5256
8	"The Prisoner in Sneakers"	Ralph Senensky	Jack Miller	November 2, 1975	5254
9	"The Trail of Bigfoot"	Claudio Guzmán	Michael Kozoll	November 9, 1975	5265
10	"The Albatross"	Ralph Senensky	Jerry McNeely	November 16, 1975	5259
11	"Adventure in Los Angeles"	Herschel Daugherty	Dick Nelson	November 23, 1975	5267
12	"Odyssey in Jeans"	Lou Antonio	Michael Kozoll	November 30, 1975	5251
