= List of Hello, Larry episodes =

This is a list of episodes for the television series Hello, Larry. The series aired for two seasons, from January 1979 to April 1980, with a total of 38 episodes. It featured three crossover episodes in which the cast of Diff'rent Strokes appeared.

== Series overview ==
Season	Episodes	Originally released		Rank	Rating
Season	Episodes	First released	Last released	Rank	Rating
1	18	January 26, 1979	October 12, 1979	68	15.7
2	20	October 19, 1979	April 30, 1980	TBA	TBA

== Episodes ==
=== Season 1 (1979) ===
No. overall	No. in season	Title	Directed by	Written by	Original release date
1	1	"How to Not To"	Doug Rogers	Dick Bensfield & Perry Grant	January 26, 1979
Diane's boyfriend is putting pressure on her to go all the way.
2	2	"The New Kid"	Doug Rogers	George Tibbles	February 2, 1979
Ruthie is rejected at school by her friends as they learn her dad is the local outspoken talk-show host.
3	3	"The Final Papers"	Doug Rogers	Story by : Dick Bensfield & Perry Grant; Teleplay by : Milt Rosen	February 9, 1979
Larry receives his final divorce papers, and struggles with his and the girls' emotional reactions to the official end of his marriage.
4	4	"The Hitchhiker"	Doug Rogers	Dick Bensfield & Perry Grant	February 16, 1979
A homesick Diane begins to miss her boyfriend in L.A., so she decides to hitch her way back.
5	5	"Mother Morgan"	Doug Rogers	Howard Albrecht & Sol Weinstein	February 23, 1979
Diane and Ruthie begin to miss their mom, and Morgan helps fill the void.
6	6	"Ruthie's First Crush"	Doug Rogers	George Tibbles	March 2, 1979
Ruthie and her friend Eric develop a case of puppy love and aren't sure how to react.
7	7	"Larry's First Date"	Doug Rogers	Martin Cohan	March 9, 1979
Recently divorced Larry goes on a date with Morgan's sister much to Morgan's worry.
8	8	"Peer Pressure"	Doug Rogers	Lois Hire	March 16, 1979
It's feared that Diane is on uppers when Larry finds them in her purse.
9	9	"Leona, the New Neighbor"	Doug Rogers	George Tibbles	March 23, 1979
New tenant Leona moves into Larry's building and aids his daughters but angers him.
10	10	"The Trip: Part 2"	Doug Rogers	Woody Kling	March 30, 1979
The Alder family welcomes Drummond's family to Portland, as Drummond is considering the downsizing of Alder's station. Note: The first half of this two-part crossover is an episode of Diff'rent Strokes. This episode is now included in the Diff'rent Strokes syndication package.
11	11	"The Triangle"	Doug Rogers	Story by : Celia Bonaduce; Teleplay by : George Tibbles	April 6, 1979
Before a party at the Alders', Ruthie's boyfriend Eric gets a crush on Diane.
12	12	"Larry's Bad Back"	Doug Rogers	Woody Kling and George Tibbles	April 13, 1979
The girls compete to see which one takes better care of their sick father.
13	13	"Rap with Ruthie"	Doug Rogers	Story by : Dick Bensfield & Perry Grant; Teleplay by : Milt Rosem	April 27, 1979
Ruthie gets to do her own radio talk-show for a school project. She uses Larry's radio show airtime.
14	14	"My Sister, the Criminal"	Doug Rogers	Dick Bensfield & Perry Grant	May 4, 1979
Diane catches Ruthie stealing.
15	15	"Feudin' and Fussin': Part 2"	Doug Rogers	George Tibbles and Woody Kling	September 28, 1979
The Drummond family welcomes the Alders to New York City, as Larry auditions there for a television talk show. Note: The first half of this two-part crossover is an episode of Diff'rent Strokes. This episode now airs as part of the Diff'rent Strokes syndication package.
16	16	"Ruthie Grows Up"	Doug Rogers	Jay Sommers & Dick Chevillat	October 5, 1979
17	17	"Ruthie Grows Up"	Doug Rogers	Story by : Earle Doud; Teleplay by : Lois Hire	October 5, 1979
Diane, thinking Ruthie is too much of a tomboy, convinces Ruthie to go to a school dance with a nice boy her own age. But during that date Ruthie develops a crush on Cubby, a slick-talking 17-year-old young man who intends to make the inexperienced, younger girl his next conquest. After inviting Cubby over without Larry's permission, Ruthie must swiftly learn how to deal with Cubby and his more grown-up intentions toward her.
18	18	"Hello, Marion: Part 1" "Marion Returns"	Doug Rogers	Story by : Wayne Kline and Mark Fink; Teleplay by : Norman Paul and Woody Kling & George Tibbles	October 12, 1979
Larry's ex-wife Marion comes to visit while Larry has to leave town with Morgan on a business trip.

=== Season 2 (1979–80) ===
No. overall	No. in season	Title	Directed by	Written by	Original release date
19	1	"Hello, Marion: Part 2"	Doug Rogers	Story by : Wayne Kline; Teleplay by : Norman Paul and George Tibbles	October 19, 1979
Ruthie keeps hoping her parents will get back together and tries much persuasion. Larry and Marion go out and have an interesting evening.
20	2	"Goodbye, Marion"	Doug Rogers	Story by : Wayne Kline; Teleplay by : Norman Paul and George Tibbles	October 26, 1979
Larry and Marion announce they are getting remarried. However, they run into problems on where they will live and where they will work.
21	3	"The Nude Emcee"	Doug Rogers	Jay Sommers & Dick Chevillat	November 7, 1979
Larry looking for extra work gets an offer to host a nude beauty pageant. But the catch is that he has to be nude too.
22	4	"Morgan the Boss"	Doug Rogers	George Tibbles & Woody Kling	November 14, 1979
Morgan becomes Larry's boss and Larry is jealous of her new position and promotion.
23	5	"Marion's Fiancé"	Doug Rogers	Al Gordon & Jack Mendelsohn	November 21, 1979
Marion's new fiancé comes to visit and mentions he and Marion will be seeking shared custody of the girls.
24	6	"Thanksgiving Crossover: Part 2"	Doug Rogers	Story by : George Tibbles & Woody Kling; Teleplay by : Woody Kling & George Tibbles and Milt Rosen	November 28, 1979
The Alders go to New York City one more time, as Larry tries to pitch the sale of a television station he wants to manage to Philip Drummond's company. Note: The first half of this two-part crossover is an episode of Diff'rent Strokes. This episode now airs as part of the Diff'rent Strokes syndication package.
25	7	"Diane Drinks"	Doug Rogers	Story by : Wayne Kline and George Tibbles & Woody Kling; Teleplay by : George Tibbles & Woody Kling	December 5, 1979
Huge trouble arises when Diane develops a big drinking problem.
26	8	"Tommy the Houseguest"	Doug Rogers	Story by : Elaine Newman; Teleplay by : Elaine Newman & George Tibbles and Jay Sommers & Dick Chevillat	December 12, 1979
Tommy has to move in temporarily with the Alders while his mother is away.
27	9	"Larry's Father"	Doug Rogers	Al Gordon & Jack Mendelsohn	December 19, 1979
Larry's father moves in and, against Larry's wishes, he gives Diane money to buy a car.
28	10	"Money from Home"	Doug Rogers	Milt Rosen	January 9, 1980
Larry's ex-wife Marion sends a sizable check to help him buy a house for his daughters. And in the process, it challenges Larry's pride.
29	11	"The Neighbor Dies"	Doug Rogers	Story by : Ralph Phillips and Douglas Tibbles & Barbara Tibbles; Teleplay by : Douglas Tibbles & Barbara Tibbles	January 16, 1980
Ruthie gets in a fight with her new piano teacher who is very much disliked. He dies after their argument and Ruthie feels responsible for his death.
30	12	"The Blind Friend"	Doug Rogers	Story by : Mitchell Wayne Cohen & Bambi Burton; Teleplay by : Mitchell Wayne Cohen & Bambi Burton and Woody Kling & George Tibbles	January 23, 1980
Morgan's blind nephew gets a sympathetic Ruthie to be his date.
31	13	"Love Around the Corner"	Doug Rogers	George Tibbles & Woody Kling	January 30, 1980
Larry meets a female tenant (who happens to be Tommy's mother) in his building's laundry room and things get very serious.
32	14	"Larry's Mid-Life Crisis: Part 1"	Doug Rogers	Story by : Woody Kling & George Tibbles; Teleplay by : Douglas Tibbles & Barbara Tibbles	February 13, 1980
Larry uses his radio show to protest destruction of a local hotel housing senior citizens. He then ends up in jail and is fired from his radio job.
33	15	"Larry's Mid-Life Crisis: Part 2"	Doug Rogers	Al Gordon & Jack Mendelsohn	February 20, 1980
Larry seeks new job offers after the loss of his radio job.
34	16	"Larry's Mid-Life Crisis: Part 3"	Doug Rogers	Jay Sommers & Dick Chevillat	February 27, 1980
Morgan also finds herself jobless, and Larry confronts the station's boss's son, in order to at least try to get her a job at the radio station.
35	17	"The Rock Star: Part 1"	Doug Rogers	Michael Endler	March 5, 1980
Ruthie wants to go to a big concert but it is sold out. Luckily, her DJ father helped give the young man his first big break on the radio back in L.A. Larry takes the girls to see the singer Curt Stone in his hotel. But later on, after Larry says no to Diane, she decides to run away from home to visit the rock star in San Francisco.
36	18	"The Rock Star: Part 2"	Doug Rogers	Al Gordon & Jack Mendelsohn	March 12, 1980
Having run away to see rock star Curt Stone in San Francisco, Diane must make a very important decision. She must choose between her new love and her family.
37	19	"The Protégé"	Doug Rogers	Glenn Padnick	April 2, 1980
Tommy asks Larry for advice on women. Soon, Tommy is in very serious trouble at school for kissing a girl in a broom closet.
38	20	"Yearning"	Art Dielhenn and Doug Rogers	George Tibbles & Woody Kling and Al Gordon & Jack Mendelsohn	April 30, 1980
Morgan's new secretary dates Larry's father and it soon seems that marriage is in their plans.

== See also ==
- List of Diff'rent Strokes episodes
