= Leif Green =

American actor and production manager

Leif Green is an American actor and production manager. He is best known for portraying T-Bird Davey Jaworski in Grease 2, the 1982 sequel to the 1978 motion picture Grease, as well as Eugene Groebe in the 1983 comedy film Joysticks.

== Early Life ==
Green was born in Wheeling, West Virginia. His parents owned Green's Donuts in South Wheeling, which operated from 1938 until the early 2000s, and Green worked in the store as a child. He is a 1978 graduate of Wheeling Park High School.

== Career ==
Green portrayed T-Bird member Davey Jaworski in the 1982 film Grease 2, the standalone sequel to the hit 1978 film Grease. A year later, he appeared in the film Joysticks as Eugene Grobe, one of the best friends of a video arcade owner who is being sabotaged by a rival business owner. Green's career continued in the 1980s with appearances on television shows such as The Powers of Matthew Star, Trauma Center, The Facts of Life and Simon & Simon.

In the early to mid 2000s, Green worked as an assistant production manager and production manager on Osmosis Jones, Looney Tunes: Back in Action and Brother Bear 2. He also performed on stage with the Young Americans College of the Performing Arts, a job he described as "the best job I ever had."

Green spent 12 years with a company that created and produced AIDS-related fundraisers that he says raised more than $100 million for AIDS research and prevention. He also worked at the Library Initiative, which built state-of-the-art libraries in underserved elementary schools in New York City.

In 2024, Green relocated to his childhood home of Wheeling, West Virginia, and he is working with the West Liberty University's theater department and with Oglebay Institute's Towngate Theatre.

== Filmography ==
=== Film ===
Year	Film	Role	Notes
1982	Grease 2	Davey Jaworski	Also performs on songs "SCORE TONIGHT" and "PROWLIN"
1983	Joysticks	Eugene Groebe	
2001	Osmosis Jones		Assistant Production Manager
2003	Looney Tunes: Back in Action		Assistant Production Manager
2006	Brother Bear 2		Production Manager (Direct-to-video)

=== Television ===
Year	Television	Role	Notes
1983	ABC Afterschool Special	Leslie	Episode: "The Woman Who Willed a Miracle"
1983	The Powers of Matthew Star	Steve	Episode: "Swords and Quests"
1983	The Best of Times	Neil Hefernan	TV pilot episode
1983	Trauma Center		Episode: "Shock Waves"
1984	The Facts of Life	Chip	Episode: "Love at First Byte"
1986	Simon & Simon	Dave	Episode: "Sunrise at Camp Apollo"

== Soundtrack ==
Year	Soundtrack
1982 (Recorded 1981)	Grease 2 (soundtrack)

== Sources ==
- Leif Green at IMDb
