= The Best of Times (TV pilot) =

1983 American television pilot

- Written by: Bob Comfort; Rick Kellard
- Directed by: Bill Bixby
- Starring: Robert Romanus; Krista Errickson; Hallie Todd; Leif Green
- Music by: Craig Safan
- Country of origin: United States
- Original language: English

Production
- Executive producers: Bob Comfort; Rick Kellard; Stuart Sheslow
- Cinematography: Richard C. Glouner
- Editor: Daniel Todd Cahn
- Running time: 30 minutes
- Production company: Thunder Road Productions Lorimar Productions

Original release
- Network: CBS
- Release: August 29, 1983

The Best of Times is an unsold television pilot that aired on CBS on August 29, 1983.

== Plot ==
Set in suburban Indiana, three friends – smooth Pete Falcone (Robert Romanus), nerdy Neil Hefernan (Leif Green) and aspiring musician Dewey "The Phantom" Hooper (Chris Nash) – are starting their freshman year at Ulysses S. Grant High School. Pete has made an agreement with his strict, but caring father Gene (Alex Rocco) that he will stay out of trouble this year, since Gene promised Pete he could have his own car, as Neil is the only one currently with a driver's license. On the way to school, they pick up two girls, Robin Dupree (Krista Errickson) and Patti Eubanks (Hallie Todd), who takes a liking to Pete immediately. Patti enlists Robin's help to woo Pete at the upcoming freshman dance, as long as Patti pays her. Dewey also has his hands full when the hard-nosed vice principal Franklin T. Otto (William G. Schilling) reminds him that he will keep a close eye on Dewey for the entire semester as he is known for pranks and cutting classes.

A subplot consists of the hulking Garth Stimlovich (Tony Longo) returning to seek revenge against Pete after ratting Garth out in a school incident, resulting in expulsion and placed in military school, as well as taunting Garth's younger brother. That night, while fixing the sink in the kitchen, Gene mistakenly receives a threatening phone call from Garth saying a fight is going to happen. Knowing Pete is part of this, Gene firmly tells him that even though he does not condone fighting, Pete has his permission to teach Garth a lesson, even if it might get Pete suspended from school.

The night of the dance, the three hatch up a plan to get even with Garth's brother. Neil stands guard outside in the parking lot while Pete and Dewey act casual in the gymnasium. Garth's brother and his friend corner Neil and he attempts to spray them with a hose that runs out of water. Pete and Dewey come to his rescue and push both bullies into a car trunk and lock it. Garth shows up and gives Pete a black eye. Patti, rising up from the flatbed of a pickup truck, knocks Garth out cold with a trash can lid. To show her gratitude, Patti tells Pete to look her number up in the phone book. The next morning, at breakfast, Peggy is infuriated about the fight and refuses to talk about it. Pete is also confused about the advice Gene has given him and questions what kind of figure he is, his father or best friend, When Pete asks him who he is today, Gene briskly, but warmly, replies that he is his father.

== Cast ==
- Robert Romanus as Pete Falcone, a student
- Krista Errickson as Robin DuPree, a student
- Hallie Todd as Patti Eubanks, a student
- Chris Nash as Dewey Hooper, a student
- Leif Green as Neil Hefernan, a student
- Alex Rocco as Gene Falcone, Pete's father
- Arlene Golonka as Peggy Falcone, Pete's mother
- Rosanna Locke as Theresa Falcone, Pete's sister

== Production ==
The show's original working title was Changing Times.

The show was intended to be an hour-long comedy-drama set in the 1960s, with the characters progressing from high school to college. Comfort complained, "When we first took it to NBC it was in an hour format. But Brandon Tartikoff, NBC's 34-year-old "Child of TV" President of Entertainment, didn't understand it. So then we took it took it to CBS and they immediately saw it as a half-hour comedy; maybe do it with three cameras on tape before a live audience. Then they said how about making it in contemporary times because CBS, at the time, was committed to doing Diner, which was set in the '60s

== Reception ==
The New York Times said that the pilot was "not bad", but says that it's hindered by trying to imitate the popular 1982 comedy-drama Diner: "It is supposed to be about the funny goings-on among the students at good old Grant High, but other elements — slices of life, pieces of drama — keep intruding."

The Manhattan, Kansas Mercury called the pilot "one of those forgettable shows that really has little to offer."
