= Joysticks (film) =

1983 film by Greydon Clark

- Directed by: Greydon Clark
- Written by: Al Gomez; Mickey Epps; Curtis Burch
- Produced by: Greydon Clark
- Starring: Joe Don Baker; Leif Green; Jim Greenleaf; Scott McGinnis
- Cinematography: Nicholas Josef von Sternberg
- Edited by: Larry Bock
- Production company: Jensen Farley Pictures
- Distributed by: Citadel Films; Liberation Entertainment
- Release date: March 4, 1983
- Running time: 88 minutes
- Country: United States
- Language: English
- Budget: $300,000 (estimated)
- Box office: $3,952,448 (USA) $1,256,315

Joysticks is a 1983 American comedy film directed by Greydon Clark.

== Plot ==
Jefferson Bailey (Scott McGinnis) runs the most popular video arcade in town, much to the chagrin of local businessman Joseph Rutter (Joe Don Baker). With his two bumbling nephews, Rutter aims to frame Bailey and have his business shut down. Bailey, however, is wise to Rutter's plan and teams with best friends Eugene Groebe (Leif Green) and McDorfus (Jim Greenleaf) to stop this scheme, which also involves a video game duel with punker King Vidiot (Jon Gries).

== Cast ==
- Joe Don Baker as Joseph Rutter
- Leif Green as Eugene Groebe
- Jim Greenleaf as Jonathan Andrew McDorfus
- Scott McGinnis as Jefferson Bailey
- Jon Gries as King Vidiot (credited as Jonathan Gries)
- Corinne Bohrer as Patsy Rutter
- John Diehl as Arnie
- John Voldstad as Max
- Reid Cruickshanks as Coach Straight
- Morgan Lofting as Mrs. Rutter
- Kym Malin as Lola
- Kim G. Michel as Alva
- Jacqulin Cole as Alexis Wheeler
- Logan Ramsey as Mayor Neville
- Justine Lenore as Nurse Tubitt

== Production ==
Director Greydon Clark decided his next film would be an R-rated teen sex comedy based around video games when he saw a group of teenagers playing arcade games in the lobby during a test screening of his previous film, Wacko. The original title was Video Madness. The production took 13 days. Midway Games allowed the film to use the image of Pac-Man just for featuring its games in the film. These included Satan's Hollow and the then-unreleased Super Pac-Man used during the film's climactic video game showdown. It also showcased a game by Los Angeles company Computer Kinetics Corp. called Stripper, which was a mod of a Shoei game called Streaker.

== Release ==
The film was theatrically released on March 4, 1983, in the United States by Jensen Farley Pictures and was the fifth highest grossing in its first week. It grossed $3,952,448 in the United States.

The film was released on VHS and Betamax by Vestron Video. Liberation Entertainment released the film on DVD in 2006. It was released on Blu-ray by Scorpion in 2013 as a 30th anniversary edition.

In May 2024, Movie Rewind Collection (MVD) released an all new Blu-Ray of the film.

== Soundtrack ==
The film's soundtrack was released in November 2015 by Eczema Records.
