= Robert Romanus =

American actor and musician

Robert "Bob" Romanus
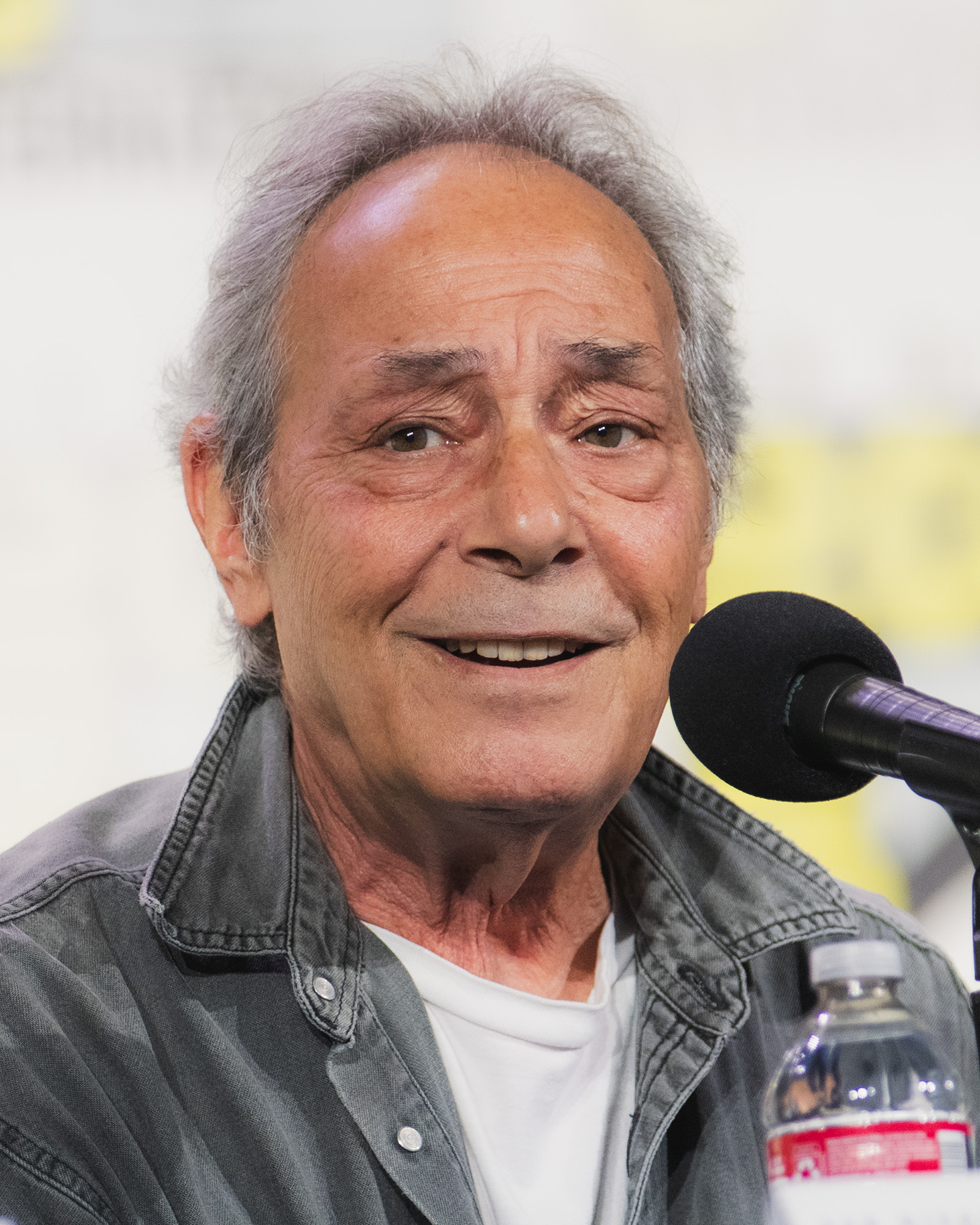
- Romanus in 2026
- Born: July 17, 1956 (age 70); Hartford, CT
- Occupations: Actor; musician
- Years active: 1980–present
- Known for: Fame; Fast Times at Ridgemont High
- Spouse: Kari Lizer (divorced)
- Children: 3
- Relatives: Richard Romanus (brother)

Robert Romanus (born July 17, 1956), also billed as Bob Romanus, is an American actor and musician who has starred in film and television. He is perhaps best known for his role as ticket scalper Mike Damone in the 1982 comedy Fast Times at Ridgemont High, and as Natalie Green's boyfriend Snake on The Facts of Life. He also had a supporting role in the 1985 film Bad Medicine.

== Life and career ==
Romanus is the son of Eileen (née Maloof) and Dr. Raymond Romanos, and is the brother of actor Richard Romanus. He is of Lebanese descent. He grew up in West Hartford, Connecticut, where he graduated from Conard High School in 1974.

He starred in the 1983 series The Best of Times as Pete Falcone and appeared in Fame as Miltie Horowitz (1986–1987). He also co-starred in Fast Times at Ridgemont High (1982).

In 1983, he appeared in Styx's music video for Kilroy Was Here.

Romanus has starred on soap operas such as Days of Our Lives as Marvin 'Speed' Selejko from 1983 to 1985 and The Young and the Restless as Lou in 2002. He has guest-starred on many shows, including CHiPs, The Facts of Life, 21 Jump Street, Alien Nation, MacGyver, Providence, Will & Grace, and My Own Worst Enemy. Romanus directed the 2008 drama Grapefruit Moon and had a small part in American Pie Presents: The Book of Love as himself. In 2010, he played the guitar teacher in The Runaways. His 2018 projects include the films Genesis: The Future of Mankind Is Woman, The Liquid Psychologist and Voyeur.

== Personal life ==
Romanus once owned a café in North Hollywood, Bob's Espresso Bar, which closed in 2014.

== Filmography ==
=== Film ===
Year	Title	Role	Notes
1980	Foxes	Scott	
1982	Fast Times at Ridgemont High	Mike Damone	
1985	Bad Medicine	Carlos	
1988	Pulse	Paul	
1988	Dangerous Curves	Hector	
1989	Curfew	Jack	credited as Bob Romanus
1991	The Resurrected	Lonnie Peck	
1997	Lover Girl	Mr. Hairdresser	
1998	Expose	Detective Forrest	
1999	Valerie Flake	Bartender	
1999	Tycus	Sam	Direct-to-Video
1999	Carlo's Wake	Enzo D'Angelo	
2000	Straight Right	Ron	
2000	Bit Players	The Assistant Director	Short film
2001	The Socratic Method	Meffastaffollo	
2001	D.A.R.E. Safety Tips Starring Retro Bill	Stranger in Car	Short film
2003	The Utopian Society	Barry	
2003	BachelorMan	Executive #2	
2004	The Last Run	Steven's Boss	
2005	Going Shopping	Jimmy	
2005	A Halfway House Christmas	Daryl	
2006	Mojave Phone Booth	Richard	
2007	Route 30	Stive	
2009	Road to the Altar	Lighting Guy	
2009	American Pie Presents: The Book of Love	Alumnus Guy #6 – Special Appearance	Direct-to-DVD
2010	The Runaways	Guitar Teacher	
2012	Route 30, Too!	Dick	
2013	The Midnight Game	Derrick	
2013	The Shifting	Juan	
2016	Talons	Parole Officer Wally Emerson	
2016	The Remake	Mark Curtis	
2017	The Matchmaker	Sam	Short film
2018	The Liquid Psychologist	Bruce Kennedy	Short film
2017	Voyeur	Horschel	
2019	Genesis: The Future of Mankind Is Woman	Boyd Peterson	
TBA	Concert Heroes		

=== Television ===
Year	Title	Role	Notes
1973	The Young and the Restless	Lou	unknown episode
1982	CHiPs	Ray	Episode: "Speedway Fever"
1983	The Best of Times	Pete Falcone	unknown episode
1984	Days of Our Lives	Marvin 'Speed' Selejko	Episode: "#1.4632"
1984–1987	Fame	Milton 'Psycho' Horowitz	recurring role (10 episodes)
1985	St. Elsewhere	Nick Meose	Episode: The Naked and the Dead"
1985	MacGyver	Frank Bennett	Episode: "The Prodigal"
1986	The Secret Sunday	Mando Harris	Television Movie
1987	Tales from the Darkside	Rob the Apprentice	Episode: "The Social Climber"
1987	Ghost of a Chance	unknown role	Television Movie
1987–1988	The Facts of Life	Norbert 'Snake' Robinson Jr.	recurring role (4 episodes)
1989	Hooperman	Coffee Mug	Episode: "Goodnight, Sweet Hooperman"
1989	21 Jump Street	Officer Gary Sharp / Cadet Mortelarro	2 episodes – "The Blu Flu" – "Draw the Line"
1990	Alien Nation	Zack Whelan	Episode: "Partners"
1990	Booker	Ton DeAngelo	recurring role (3 episodes)
1994	Renegade	Hog Adams' friend	Episode: "Hostage"
1994	Weird Science	Damien	Episode: "Lisa's Virus"
1996	Boston Common	Doctor Bob	Episode: "Trustee and Sympathy"
1998	Maggie Winters	Jeff Foster	unknown episode
2000	Providence	Ted Lumley	Episode: "Don't Go Changin' "
2000	The Invisible Man	GAO Agent	Episode: "Tiresias"
2000	Baby Blues	unknown role	Episode: "God Forbid"
2000	Will & Grace	Lenny	Episode: "Gypsies, Tramps and Weed"
2001	V.I.P.	Dr. Bob Landesberg	Episode: "Amazon Val"
2007	Fawlty Tower Oxnard	Basil	recurring role (7 episodes)
2008	My Own Worst Enemy	Sullivan	Episode: "Henry and the Terrible...Day"
2009	Cold Case	Dwight Barnes '09	Episode: "Iced"
2011	Cloud Boy	Steve Majors	unknown episode
2012	Touch	Nelson	Episode: "Tessellations"
2012	Wedding Band	Reggie the Landlord	Episode: "I Don't Wanna Grow Up"
2012	Bite Me	Pizzeria Cook	Episode: "Shot Gun"
2013	Legit	Smirkowski	Episode: "Justice"
2013	Family Guy	Mike Damone (voice role)	Episode: "Chris Cross"
2013	The Flipside	unknown role	Episode: "Pre-Date"
2014	Cougar Town	Director	Episode: "Hard on Me"
2014	CSI: Crime Scene Investigation	Taxi Driver	Episode: "Angle of Attack"
2014	Mac and Abby	Director	unknown episode
2016	Code Black	Henry Underwood	Episode: "Second Year"

=== Music videos ===
Year	Title	Role	Notes
1983	"Kilroy Was Here"	Jonathan Chance's Friend	artist: Styx
