= The First Time (1981 film) =

1981 film by Charlie Loventhal

- Directed by: Charlie Loventhal
- Screenplay by: Charlie Loventhal; Susan Weiser-Finley; William Finley
- Produced by: Sam Irvin
- Starring: Tim Choate; Krista Errickson; Marshall Efron; Wendy Fulton; Raymond Patterson; Wallace Shawn; Wendie Jo Sperber
- Release dates: 1981 (limited); 1983 (wide)
- Country: United States
- Language: English

The First Time is a 1981 American coming of age comedy film written and directed by Charlie Loventhal and starring Tim Choate.

== Plot ==
A shy virgin pursues women in a mostly female college while studying under an eccentric film professor.

== Production and release ==
After working with Brian de Palma on Home Movies, de Palma mentored Loventhal on this film.

== Cast ==
- Tim Choate as Charlie Lichtenstein
- Krista Errickson as Dana
- Marshall Efron as Nick Rand
- Wendy Fulton as Wendy
- Raymond Patterson as Ron
- Wallace Shawn as Jules Goldfarb
- Wendie Jo Sperber as Eileen

== Filming locations ==
- Sarah Lawrence College, Bronxville, New York, USA
