= Jane Austen in Manhattan =

1980 film by James Ivory

- DVD cover
- Directed by: James Ivory
- Screenplay by: Ruth Prawer Jhabvala
- Based on: Sir Charles Grandison by Jane Austen; Samuel Richardson; Sir Charles Grandison, or The Happy Man by Jane Austen; The History of Sir Charles Grandison by Samuel Richardson
- Produced by: Ismail Merchant
- Starring: Anne Baxter; Robert Powell; Michael Wager; Sean Young; Charles McCaughan; Tim Choate
- Cinematography: Ernest Vincze; Larry Pizer (opera sequence)
- Edited by: David E. McKenna
- Music by: Richard Robbins (arranged from the works of Wolfgang Amadeus Mozart); Katrina Hodiak (songs)
- Distributed by: Contemporary Films
- Release date: July 1980
- Running time: 111 minutes
- Country: United States
- Language: English
- Budget: $450,000

Jane Austen in Manhattan is a 1980 American romantic drama film produced by Merchant Ivory Productions for LWT, but released for theatrical exhibition in UK and USA. It was the last film appearance of Anne Baxter and the debut film of Sean Young.

The film concerns competing theatrical productions in present-day New York, of a recently discovered early Austen work.

== Plot ==
Two teachers vie for the right to stage a play written by Jane Austen when she was twelve years old, adapted from The History of Sir Charles Grandison by Samuel Richardson. Pierre seeks to direct an avant-garde production, but Victor is unhappy about how much influence he has over his wife Ariadne, who is cast as the heroine.

== Cast ==
=== Starring ===
- Anne Baxter - Lilliana Zorska
- Robert Powell - Pierre
- Michael Wager - George Midash
- Tim Choate - Jamie
- John Guerrasio - Gregory
- Katrina Hodiak - Katya
- Kurt Johnson - Victor Charlton
- Philip Lenkowsky - Fritz
- Charles McCaughan - Billie
- Nancy New - Jenny
- Sean Young - Ariadne Charlton
- Iman - Sufi Leader
