= Route 30 (film) =

- Directed by: John Putch
- Written by: John Putch
- Starring: Dana Delany; Curtis Armstrong; David DeLuise; Christine Elise; Kevin Rahm; Robert Romanus
- Production company: RT30 Collective
- Release date: July 2007 (Dances with Films)
- Country: United States
- Language: English

Route 30 is a 2007 independent comedy film written by John Putch, and starring Dana Delany, Curtis Armstrong, David DeLuise, Christine Elise, Kevin Rahm and Robert Romanus. Route 30 was released on DVD in the U.S. on Nov. 17, 2009.

== Plot ==
Three interconnecting stories about some rural folks in South Central Pennsylvania. The first film in the Route 30 Trilogy. 'Deer Hunters' Wives' tells of the frustrations of Civil War tour guide Mandy (Nathalie Boltt), who obsesses on Jennie Wade, the only civilian killed at the Battle of Gettysburg. While her friend June (Christine Elise McCarthy) struggles with an internet porn scheme to make extra money. 'What I Believe' focuses on a man (Kevin Rahm) who seeks the help of a Christian Scientist (Wil Love) to heal his back pain and explain the Big Foot that chased him down the mountainside. 'Original Bill' is the story of a writer (David DeLuise) who buys a farmhouse in the country hoping to find unique inspiration to write his novel. He is sidetracked by his Amish neighbor (Dana Delany), who smokes, drinks, swears, and watches his TV.

== Cast ==
- Dana Delany as Amish Martha
- Curtis Armstrong as Ned
- David DeLuise as Original Bill
- Christine Elise McCarthy as June
- Kevin Rahm as Arden
- Robert Romanus as Stive
- Nathalie Boltt as Mandy
- David Cowgill as Tork
- Alicia Fusting as Golfer Gal
- Wil Love as Henry
- Lee Wilkof as Rotten Egg

== Production notes ==
The character of Original Bill is based on the director's father, Bill, and his summer theater. The elder Putch was the husband of actress Jean Stapleton and teacher of actresses Shirley Jones.

Route 30 is the first film in a trilogy.
