= Tim Choate =

American actor (1954–2004)

- Choate at Barrett House in New Ipswich, New Hampshire in the fall of 1978 during the filming of The Europeans
- Born: October 11, 1954; Dallas, Texas, US
- Died: September 24, 2004 (aged 49); Los Angeles, California, US
- Resting place: Forest Lawn Memorial Park (Glendale)
- Occupation: Actor
- Years active: 1979–2004

Timothy Clark Choate (October 11, 1954 – September 24, 2004) was an American actor who starred in a number of film and television roles on series such as Dragnet and Babylon 5.

Choate was born and raised in Dallas, Texas, the son of Betty Nell (née Strong), a commercial artist, and Ben Tom Choate, who worked in building and construction. He appeared in theater productions while attending the University of Texas in Austin and also attended Cornell University.

He was active on stage in both New York and Hollywood. On Broadway, he appeared in Crimes of the Heart and Da. He also performed at the Los Angeles Shakespeare Fest in Twelfth Night and The Merry Wives of Windsor as well as in the Los Angeles production of Beyond Therapy. Choate appeared in regional productions at the Long Wharf Theater, the Kennedy Center and the Berkshire Theatre Festival.

His film appearances included several Merchant Ivory productions including The Europeans (1979), Jane Austen in Manhattan (1980), and Jefferson in Paris (1995); Times Square (1980), Ghost Story (1981), Blow Out (1981), Def-Con 4 (1985), the Oscar-winning short Ray's Male Heterosexual Dance Hall (1987), Soapdish (1991), Immaculate Conception (1992), Live Nude Girls (1995), and Pearl Harbor (2001).

On television, he played Zathras on Babylon 5 and had a recurring role on Newhart, as well as appearing in several TV movies, notably Blind Witness (1989), Highway to Heaven (1989) and Child in the Night (1990), and guesting on shows including The Practice, Diagnosis: Murder, The Bold and the Beautiful, and Murder, She Wrote. He played Michael Killup in the Tales from the Darkside episode "Halloween Candy" (1985).

== Death ==
Tim Choate was killed in a motorcycle accident in Los Angeles, California in 2004, aged 49. He is interred at Forest Lawn Memorial Park in Glendale, California.

== Filmography ==
Year	Title	Role	Notes
1979	The Europeans	Clifford	
1980	Jane Austen in Manhattan	Jamie	
1980	Times Square	Eastman	
1981	Blow Out	Sailor	
1981	Ghost Story	Young Ricky Hawthorne	
1983	The First Time	Charlie Lichtenstein	
1985	Def-Con 4	Howe	
1987	Ray's Male Heterosexual Dance Hall	Phil Leeds	
1991	Soapdish	Assistant Director	
1992	Immaculate Conception	David Schwartz	
1995	Jefferson in Paris	Reporter	
1995	Girl in the Cadillac	Motel owner	
1995	Live Nude Girls	Jerome	
2001	Pearl Harbor	Navy Doctor	
2002	Hungry Hearts	Butterfly Collector	Final role
