= Krista Errickson =

American actress and writer (b. 1964)

- Born: May 8, 1964 (age 62); Abington, Pennsylvania, U.S.
- Occupations: Journalist, documentary filmmaker, writer, producer, actress
- Years active: 1979–2009
- Known for: Little Darlings; Hello, Larry

Krista Errickson (born May 8, 1964) is an American actress, journalist, and documentary filmmaker, writer and producer who appeared in films and television productions in the 1980s and 1990s. As a teen actress, she is most recognized for her role as teen antagonist Cinder in the 1980 movie Little Darlings and the TV series Hello, Larry. She also guest starred on Diff'rent Strokes (season 2, episode 12). As an adult, she is best known for her work as a journalist with RAI (RadioTelevisioneItaliana).

== Professional life ==
A native of Abington, Pennsylvania, Errickson is one of two daughters born to Jennifer Mielziner—daughter of set designer Jo Mielziner and actress Jeanne Macintyre—and United States Army Lieutenant Robert B. Errickson. She began acting in 1978, and is a lifetime member of the Actors Studio.

As a teenager, Errickson began appearing in television and film projects. She replaced Donna Wilkes in the role of Diane Alder on the second season of the TV series Hello, Larry, and on four episodes of Diff'rent Strokes.

Errickson continued acting until 1994, appearing in movies and guest starring in shows such as Fame, Mr. Belvedere, 21 Jump Street, and Beverly Hills, 90210.

Her journalism career began at RAI's Channel 1 in Rome before becoming a host for RAI International and RAISAT. She became senior producer and journalist reporting on current events and international politics, with a focus on Middle East relations. Some of her more well-known programs were The Yellowcake Uranium Scandal, RAWA’s Meena: The Story of a Revolutionary, and In the Name of God, about Iran’s Islamic fundamentalism.

She was the first female journalist to interview Sheikh Nasrallah (for her documentary, Inside the Hezbollah, which later became the subject of a book she co-authored). For CBS and the Discovery Channel, she was co-executive producer for The Mysterious Man of The Shroud; The Genetic Revolution, a four-part series which in part exposed secret genetic experiments that were conducted by Monsanto Corporation; The Science of Human Cloning, and the program, Inside The Vatican.

In 2007, she was part of a team sent to Pakistan and Afghanistan, successfully negotiating the release of a kidnapped Italian journalist from the Taliban. In 2008, she successfully aided a recently released political prisoner leave Iran and return to the United States.

== Personal life ==
Errickson was married to Italian journalist and news anchor, Piero di Pasquale; they divorced in 2004.

== Filmography ==
- Diff'rent Strokes (TV series; 1979; 4 episodes) as Diane Alder
- Hello, Larry (TV series; 1979–80) as Diane Alder
- Little Darlings (1980) as Cinder Carlson
- Making the Grade (TV series; 1982; 1 episode)
- Jekyll and Hyde... Together Again (1982) as Ivy
- Fame (TV series; 1982; 1 Episode) as Diana
- The First Time (1982 TV movie) as Karen
- The Powers of Matthew Star (TV series; 1982; 1 episode) as Lisa
- Deadly Lessons (1983 TV movie) as Tember Logan
- The First Time (1983) as Dana
- The Best of Times (TV series; 1983) as Robin Dupree
- The Doors: Dance on Fire (Video; 1985; "L.A. Woman" segment)
- The New Gidget (TV series; 1986; 1 episode) as Karen
- Mr. Belvedere (TV series; 1988; 1 episode) as Amy Nelson
- Tour of Duty (TV series; 1989; 2 episodes) as Stacy Bridger
- Mama's Family (TV series; 1989; 1 episode) as Bunny Vanderhaus
- 21 Jump Street (TV series; 1989; 1 episode) as Christine
- Mortal Passions (1990)) as Emily
- Killer Image (1992) as Shelley
- Beverly Hills, 90210 (TV series; 1992; 3 episodes) as Maggie
- Martial Outlaw (Direct-to-video; 1993) as Lori White
- Jailbait (Direct-to-video; 1993) as Merci Cooper
- The Paperboy (1994) as Diana
- MLK: A Life (RAI; 1996) - executive producer, writer
- The Genetic Revolution (RAI; 1996) - executive producer, writer
- In The Name of God (RAI; 1997) - executive producer, co-producer, writer
- Mysterious Man of the Shroud (CBS; 1998)
- You2: The Science of Human Cloning (RAI; 2000) - executive producer, writer
- Inside The Hezbollah (RAI; 2000) - executive producer, writer
- Inside The Vatican (RAI; 2001) - executive producer, writer
- RAWA's Meena: The Story of a Revolutionary (RAI; 2002) - executive producer, writer
- The Yellowcake Uranium Scandal (RAI; 2005) - executive producer, writer
- I Am Iran (RAI; 2009) - executive producer, writer
