= Def-Con 4 =

1984 Canadian film

- Theatrical release poster
- Directed by: Paul Donovan
- Written by: Paul Donovan
- Produced by: Michael Donovan; Paul Donovan; Maura O'Connell
- Starring: Lenore Zann; Maury Chaykin; Kate Lynch; Kevin King; John Walsch; Tim Choate
- Cinematography: Douglas Connell; Les Krizsan
- Edited by: Todd C. Ramsay
- Music by: Christopher Young
- Production company: Salter Street Films
- Distributed by: New World Pictures
- Release date: March 15, 1985
- Running time: 88 minutes
- Country: Canada
- Language: English
- Budget: $800,000
- Box office: $1,057,064

Def-Con 4 is a 1985 Canadian post-apocalyptic film, portraying three astronauts who survive World War III aboard a space station and return to Earth to find greatly changed circumstances. The film's title refers to the Defense Readiness Condition (DEFCON), the United States military's nuclear alert system, though the title erroneously refers to DEFCON 4 as a high state of readiness. DEFCON 4 is in fact the second-lowest state of readiness.

== Plot ==
The film opens with the text:

It is the day after tomorrow. The ultimate nuclear defense system has been perfected. Security has been achieved. Global conflict is now unthinkable.

Day 407 of the Nemesis Mission as three astronauts man a secret space station armed with nuclear weapons. World tensions are rising after a United States transport ship secretly transporting nuclear Tomahawk missiles was hijacked by Libyan terrorists. News reports indicate one of the nuclear missiles landed but did not explode in a Soviet city. Shortly afterwards, the crew lose all contact with the ground with news reports mentioning nuclear explosions in several Soviet cities, presumably from the stolen nuclear missiles. They observe what appears to be a nuclear exchange between the United States and the Soviet Union on Earth.

A month later, the crew continues to hold out for hope of survivors and debate what they should do. Cecil Howe (Tim Choate) receives a broadcast from his wife whose rural community escaped the initial bombing. Unable to respond, he listens as his wife describes how many residents, including his sister, were blinded by the nuclear explosion. How radiation sickness is ravaging the survivors, that she is sick, and their infant child has also died.

Two months later, the spacecraft's guidance system is mysteriously reprogrammed, forcing the crew's return to Earth. The crew set their remaining nuclear payload to explode in 60 hours and all but one missile properly jettisons. The spacecraft lands considerably off-course, on a beach in eastern Nova Scotia, Canada. Eva Jordan (Kate Lynch) is knocked unconscious on impact. Hearing knocking on the capsule, Howe and Walker (John Walsch) attempt to dig out believing they have been found by survivors. However, Walker is quickly pulled out and eaten by the "terminals": humans crazed by radiation poisoning and starvation.

Several hours later, Howe leaves a message for a still unconscious Jordan and ventures out in search of help. He soon encounters Vincent "Vinny" Mckinnon (Maury Chaykin), a survivalist who has fortified his house with barbed wire and booby-traps. Howe attempts to use the four months supply of food in the capsule as a bargaining chip. He then meets Jacelyn "J.J." Jameson (Lenore Zann) who is being kept prisoner by Vinny. Using an armor-plated tractor, the group heads back to the beach to find the capsule but are ambushed by survivors from a nearby military fort. Both the capsule and the group are taken to the fort that is being run by Gideon Hayes, (Kevin King) J.J's boyfriend and son of a high-ranking naval officer.

While attempting to flee to a government shelter, the group's helicopter is taken out by an electromagnetic pulse (EMP) from the nuclear explosions. The only survivors are Gideon, J.J., Marine Corporal Lacey, and Boomer, a Navy technician paralyzed by the crash. Using satellite equipment taken from the helicopter, it was Boomer who was able to force Howe's space station to crash at the beach. By using equipment from the salvaged capsule, Gideon finds an active survival station to seek shelter from the radiation and fallout covering the globe. Gideon estimates that everyone in the area will be dead in two months when the winds blow denser fallout clouds to the area.

The following morning Gideon places Howe, Jordan, Vinny, and J.J. through a kangaroo court. All are found guilty by unanimous vote and sentenced to hang. As they prepare for the hanging, Boomer has crawled to the stand and plans to use a revolver to shoot Gideon. Howe bluffs to have his life spared in exchange for pulling the lever to hang the others. During the ensuing chaos, Howe is able to escape while Boomer is killed. Jordan is released to treat Gideon's gunshot wound and negotiates the release of the others. Jordan tries to murder Gideon but is killed in the process. Howe uses Vinny's armored tractor to free Vinny and arms the camp's prisoners.

Gideon, Lacey, and J.J. try to escape on a sailboat while Howe swims after them. During the ensuing fight, Gideon and Lacey are thrown overboard. Both return to the camp to find most of the inhabitants have been killed with only a dozen guards left. Gideon points at the capsule's nuclear silo and asks "Wait, shouldn't all of those be empty?" As the timer reaches zero, Howe, Vinny, and J.J. observe the nuclear explosion from their sailboat now out at sea. The sailboat floating in the ocean fades as text on the screen reads:

The final victory has been won. Mankind can now rest in peace.

== Cast ==
- Tim Choate as Cecil Howe
- Maury Chaykin as Vincent "Vinny" Mckinnon
- Lenore Zann as Jacelyn "J.J." Jameson
- Kate Lynch as Dr. Eva Jordan
- Kevin King as Gideon Hayes
- John Walsch as Walker
- Jeff Pustil as Lt. Corporal Lacey
- Donna King as Alice
- Alan MacGillivray as Boomer
- Florence Paterson as Mrs. Boyd

== Production ==
The film was primarily directed by Paul Donovan. Digby C. Cook directed the WWN news segment. Tony Randel directed part of the film but received no credit.

== Reception ==
TV Guide gave the movie 3 out of 5 stars, praising the war scenario, the darker approach to the apocalypse genre and the overall disturbing effect of the movie. In Creature Feature, the movie received 2.5 out of 5 stars, finding the space scenes of the movie good, but the land-based scenes commonplace. Kim Newman found the plot of a pre-apocalyptic person thrust into a post-apocalyptic world to be a cliché based on The Time Machine by H. G. Wells.
