= Charles McCaughan =

American actor and director

Charles McCaughan is an American actor and director.

== Filmography ==
=== Director and writer ===
- Angel on Fire (2005)
- Picture of Priority (1998)

=== Acting ===
- The Cisco Kid (1994, TV) - Haynie
- V.I. Warshawski (1991) - Trumble Grafalk
- Legal Tender (1991) - Bud Rennick
- Impulse (1990) - Frank Munoff
- Slaves of New York (1989, Merchant Ivory) - Sherman
- Waxwork (1988) - Inspector Roberts
- The House on Carroll Street (1988) - Salwen Aide #1
- Quicksilver (1986) - 'Airborne'
- Hot Resort (1985) - Daryl
- The Bostonians (1984, Merchant Ivory) - Music Hall Police Officer
- Heat and Dust (1983, Merchant Ivory) - Chid - 1982 In Satipur Town
- Jane Austen in Manhattan (1980, Merchant Ivory]) - Billie

=== TV series (guest) ===
- Silk Stalkings - "Community Service" (1995) - Bailiff
- War of the Worlds - "The Defector", episode 33 (1990), 'Kemo'
- Matlock - "The Blues Singer" (1989) - Dennis Johnson
- Jake and the Fatman - "Why Can't You Behave?" (1989) - Actor
- Crime Story - "Ground Zero" (1987) - Actor
- Miami Vice - "The Great McCarthy" (episode 8, 1984) - Dale Gifford

== Stage work ==
- Real Dreams, Williamstown Theatre Festival, 1984
- Hope of the Heart, poems by Robert Penn Warren, Los Angeles Music Center, 1990
- Orpheus Descending, West End Theater, New York, 1982
