= Kevin Rahm =

American actor (born 1971)

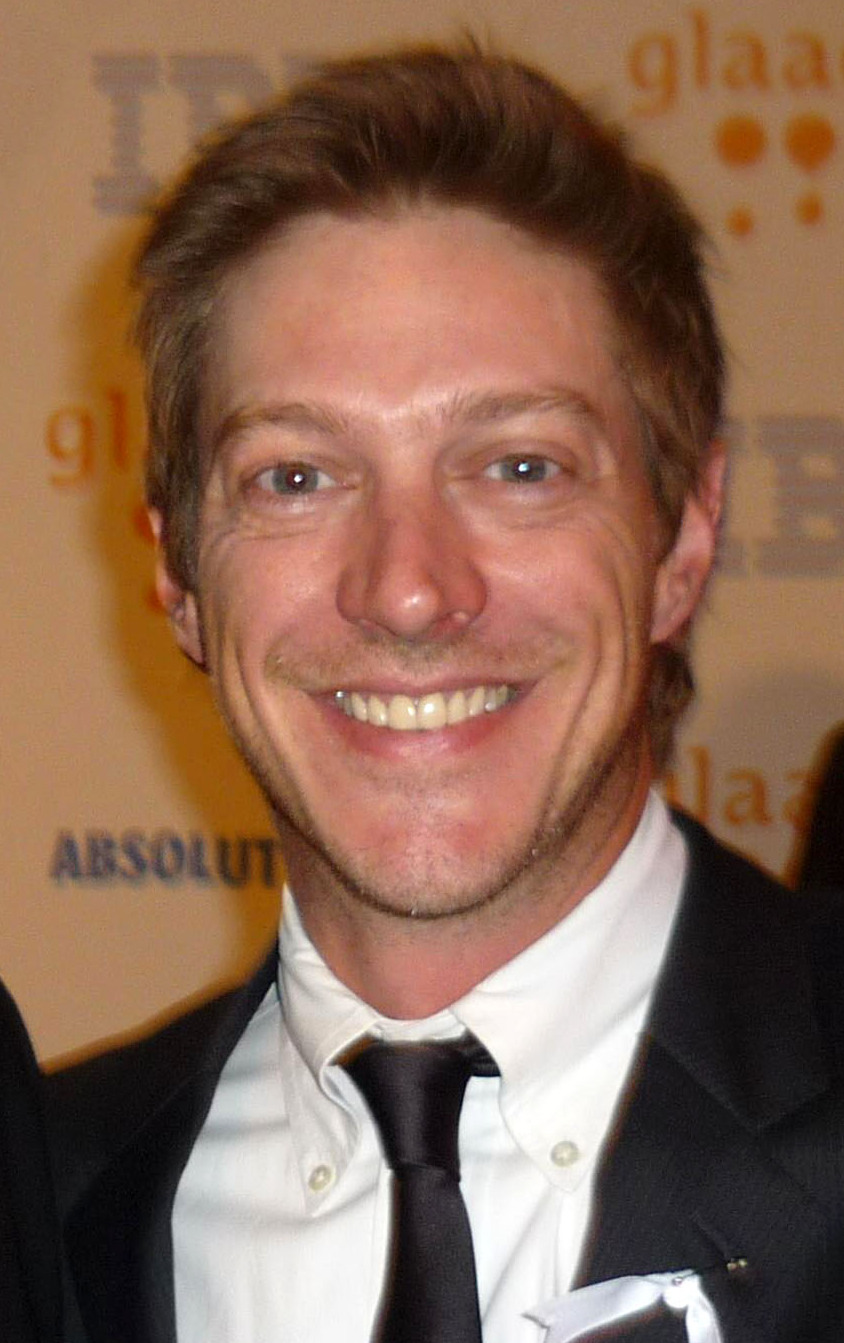
- Rahm in 2009
- Born: January 7, 1971 (age 55); Mineral Wells, Texas, U.S.
- Education: Brigham Young University
- Occupation: Actor
- Years active: 1993–present
- Spouse: Amy Lonkar (m. 2012)
- Children: 1

Kevin Rahm (born January 7, 1971) is an American actor. He is known for his television roles as Kyle McCarty on Judging Amy, Lee McDermott on Desperate Housewives, and Ted Chaough on Mad Men.

== Early life and education ==
Rahm was born in Mineral Wells, Texas. He was raised in Bossier City, Louisiana, where he was a cheerleader at Loyola College Prep in Shreveport, Louisiana and graduated from Atlanta High School in Atlanta, Texas in 1989. Following high school, Rahm, then a member of the Church of Jesus Christ of Latter-day Saints, attended one of the church's Missionary Training Centers before serving as a missionary in France, Switzerland, and on the islands of Mauritius and Réunion between 1990 and 1992.

After returning to the United States, he studied pre-law at Brigham Young University, before changing his major to drama. In 1994, he was awarded the Irene Ryan Award for best college actor. In 1996, Rahm dropped out of college to pursue an acting career in Hollywood.

== Career ==
Rahm played Kyle McCarty, Amy Gray's cousin, for three seasons on Judging Amy. He joined the show in season 3, when Dan Futterman left. In 2001 he starred in the Volkswagen Super Bowl commercial "Big Day". On October 21, 2007, he made his first appearance as Lee McDermott, a new Wisteria Lane resident on ABC's Desperate Housewives, who is gay.

In 2014, Rahm was cast as a newsroom editor in the film Nightcrawler. From 2010 to 2015, Rahm played Ted Chaough, a Madison Avenue advertising creative director, in AMC's award-winning series Mad Men. In March 2015, Rahm began starring in a recurring role as consultant and attorney Michael "Mike B." Barnow on the CBS political drama series Madam Secretary.

== Personal life ==
On April 28, 2012 Rahm married Amy Lonkar, a cardiothoracic surgeon at the UC Davis Medical Center. They have a daughter. The family lives in Sacramento, California.

== Filmography ==
=== Film ===
Year	Title	Role	Notes
1993	The Mediator	Debtor	Short film
1995	Out of Annie's Past	Young Waiter	
1995	Of Love & Betrayal	Jack O'Connor	
1996	Turning Point	Young Frank Thomas	
1996	Same River Twice	Moocher	
1997	Tiny Heroes	Weasels (voice)	
1998	Clay Pigeons	Bystander at Amanda's	
1999	Valerie Flake	Jogger Ronald	
2000	Intrepid	Steward Beck	
2000	Nurse Betty	Friend #1	
2001	Alfred Hitchcock's Gun	Andrew	
2004	Everybody and Their Mother Wants to Write and Direct	Agent's Assistant	
2004	Alfie	Terry	
2005	Chasing Leonard	Clark	Short film
2006	Moosecock	Jimmy Johnson	Short film
2006	Mojave Phone Booth	Tim	
2006	Falling Objects	Peter	Short film
2007	Route 30	Arden	
2007	LA Blues	Bobby Gordon	
2007	Easy Pickins	Jimmy	Short film
2007	Nonplussed	Liam	Short film
2012	Overnight	Chip	
2014	Nightcrawler	Frank Kruse	
2017	Clinical	Alex	
2018	The Oath	Keith Balers	

=== Television ===
Year	Title	Role	Notes
1996	Touched by an Angel	Doug Richards	Episode: "The One That Got Away"
1996	In the Blink of an Eye	Gate Guard	Television movie
1996	Unabomber: The True Story	Gary Wright	Television movie
1997	Divided by Hate	Frank	Television movie
1998	Legion of Fire: Killer Ants!	Glenn	Television movie
1998	Pacific Blue	Ed Simmons	Episode: "Cutting Edge"
1999–2000	Jesse	Dr. Danny Kozak	20 episodes
1999	Star Trek: Deep Space Nine	Norvo	Episode: "Prodigal Daughter"
1999	Beverly Hills, 90210	Jay Snelling	Episode: "Bobbi Dearest"
1999	Rescue 77	Hansen	3 episodes
1999	Silk Stalkings	—N/a	Episode: "Dream Weavers"
1999	Everything's Relative	Leo Gorelick	4 episodes
2001–2004	Judging Amy	Kyle McCarty	65 episodes
2001	Ally McBeal	Clayton Hooper	Episode: "Reach Out and Touch"
2001	Friends	Tim	Episode: "The One with Rachel's Date"
2005	Joan of Arcadia	Dana Tuchman	2 episodes
2005	Grey's Anatomy	Mr. Duff	Episode: "Save Me"
2005	Close to Home	Pastor Mark Rayburn	Episode: "Divine Directions"
2006	Crumbs	Roger	2 episodes
2006	CSI: NY	Tony Collins	Episode: "Fair Game"
2006	Night Stalker	Dr. Aaron Shields	Episode: "Timeless"
2006	CSI: Crime Scene Investigation	Joe Hirschoff	2 episodes
2006	Alpha Mom	—N/a	Television movie
2007–2012	Desperate Housewives	Lee McDermott	53 episodes
2007	Scrubs	Joe Hutnick	Episode: "My Own Worst Enemy"
2007	Conspiracy	—N/a	Unsold TV pilot
2008	Without a Trace	Ryan McAvoy	Episode: "Closure"
2009	CSI: Miami	Dr. Sean Loftin	Episode: "Chip/Tuck"
2009	Three Rivers	John Warren	Episode: "The Kindness of Strangers"
2010	The Mentalist	Brad Elias	S2 E13 "Redline"
2010	Open Books	Dale	Television movie
2010–2015	Mad Men	Ted Chaough	27 episodes Nominated—Screen Actors Guild Award for Outstanding Performance by an Ensemble in a Drama Series
2011–2013	I Hate My Teenage Daughter	Jack	13 episodes
2014	Surviving Jack	Adult Frankie (voice)	7 episodes
2014	Red Zone	Paul Jordan	Television movie
2015–2016	Bates Motel	Bob Paris	9 episodes
2015–2019	Madam Secretary	Michael 'Mike B' Barnow	29 episodes
2016–2019	Lethal Weapon	Captain Brooks Avery	49 episodes
2018	The Joel McHale Show with Joel McHale	Special Guest	Episode: "Skip Joel"
2021–2022	Love, Victor	Charles Campbell	5 episodes
