= Hello, Larry =

American television series

- Genre: Sitcom
- Created by: Dick Bensfield; Perry Grant
- Written by: Dick Bensfield; Perry Grant; George Tibbles
- Directed by: Doug Rogers; Art Dielhenn (series finale)
- Starring: McLean Stevenson; Joanna Gleason; Kim Richards; George Memmoli; Donna Wilkes; Krista Errickson; Ruth Brown; Meadowlark Lemon; Fred Stuthman; John Femia
- Composers: John LaSalle; Tom Smith
- Country of origin: United States
- Original language: English
- No. of seasons: 2
- No. of episodes: 38 (List of episodes)

Production
- Executive producers: Dick Bensfield; Perry Grant; George Tibbles
- Producers: Rita Dillon; Woody Kling; Patricia Fass Palmer; George Tibbles
- Running time: 30 minutes
- Production company: T.A.T. Communications Company

Original release
- Network: NBC
- Release: January 26, 1979 – April 30, 1980

Related
- Diff'rent Strokes

Hello, Larry is an American sitcom television series created by Dick Bensfield and Perry Grant, starring McLean Stevenson. It aired on NBC from January 26, 1979, to April 30, 1980. Its broadcast run consisted of 38 episodes over two seasons.

When Hello, Larry was created, Bensfield and Grant were veteran writers with résumés going back to The Adventures of Ozzie and Harriet and The Andy Griffith Show. They had also worked on One Day at a Time, a CBS sitcom about a single woman raising two teenage daughters alone. The show was produced by Woody Kling and directed by Doug Rogers.

Originally, the series was to star Cliff Gorman, who was replaced by McLean Stevenson after an altercation between Gorman and costar Donna Wilkes.

== Synopsis ==
=== First season ===
Larry Alder (McLean Stevenson) is a radio talk show host who left Los Angeles after being divorced, and moved to Portland, Oregon, with his two teenage daughters, Diane (played in the first season by Donna Wilkes and in the second season by Krista Errickson) and Ruthie (played by Kim Richards). The supporting cast consisted of producer Morgan (Joanna Gleason) and engineer Earl (George Memmoli).

The first five episodes, shown at a later primetime slot, centered on Larry at the radio station and his smart-aleck remarks to callers. In these early episodes, Larry is described by Fred Silverman as "a buffoon, the cliché TV father". After that point, a "complete turnaround in the direction of the series" was made, concurrent with a move to an earlier time slot, to put the emphasis on the relationship between Larry and his daughters.

In its new earlier timeslot, Hello, Larry aired immediately after NBC's hit Diff'rent Strokes. In the hope of raising the popularity of Hello, Larry, crossovers were created between the two series. By episode 10, "The Trip: Part 2", Larry Alder and Phillip Drummond were revealed to be old Army buddies (with Drummond's company becoming the new owners of Larry's radio station). Some contemporary articles have incorrectly stated that Hello, Larry was a spin-off of Diff'rent Strokes, with the crossover episodes constituting a backdoor pilot; in fact, the Diff'rent Strokes episodes were broadcast while Hello, Larry was already on the air, and the relationship between Larry and Drummond was the result of retconning in both series.

=== Second season ===
The trend to focus on Larry and his daughters continued into the second season, with Morgan and Earl being seen less frequently. The show's opening theme lyrics in the second season were changed; the line “the calls are comin' in, you'd better start to grin” in reference to Larry's radio career gave way to “you're raising them just fine, but keep an open mind” when the stories became more focused on the Alder household.

In addition, various supporting characters were added in the apartment building where Larry and the girls lived; these included a neighbor, Leona (Ruth Brown), who usually did not approve of Larry's parenting; Tommy (John Femia), a purportedly worldly wise teenage boy who became a love interest for Ruthie; Larry's widowed father (Fred Stuthman), who moved in with the younger Alders; and former Harlem Globetrotters player Meadowlark Lemon as himself, running a local sporting-goods store in the series (believed to be an attempt to boost ratings with African-American audiences who had tuned in for Diff'rent Strokes). None of these changes, nor a two-part episode in which Larry's ex-wife Marian (Shelley Fabares) tried to reconcile with him, were enough to save the show.

== Cast ==
- McLean Stevenson as Larry Alder
- Kim Richards as Ruthie Alder
- Joanna Gleason as Morgan Winslow
- Donna Wilkes as Diane Alder (season 1)
- George Memmoli as Earl (season 1)
- Krista Errickson as Diane Alder (season 2)
- Ruth Brown as Leona Wilson (season 2)
- Fred Stuthman as Henry Alder (season 2)
- John Femia as Tommy (season 2)
- Meadowlark Lemon as himself (season 2)

== Broadcast history ==
Season	Time slot (ET)
1978–79	Friday at 10:00 pm (Episode 1); Friday at 9:30 pm (Episodes 2–5); Friday at 8:30 pm (Episodes 6–14)
1979–80	Friday at 8:30 pm (Episodes 1, 3–6); Friday at 8:00 pm (Episode 2); Wednesday at 9:30 pm (Episodes 7–24)

== Reception ==
Hello, Larry was greeted by viewers who had high expectations based on series star McLean Stevenson's previous M*A*S*H association, and was launched the year after Fred Silverman, a man known to launch television hits, had just joined NBC as its president and CEO. By January 1979, Stevenson already had two unsuccessful sitcoms under his belt since leaving M*A*S*H—The McLean Stevenson Show, which also aired on NBC, in 1976–77, and In the Beginning, which aired at the beginning of the 1978 season on CBS.

The show immediately gained a reputation as a poorly written, unfunny sitcom. A month into its run, Hello, Larry was being lampooned by Johnny Carson on the show's own network; and even after its early retooling toward the relationship with Larry and his daughters, the series was not gaining a strong ratings following. Television reviewers were baffled at Hello, Larry's renewal for the 1979 fall season, citing its poor writing and a shallow supporting cast.

Hello, Larry was described as a television series that (depending on the writing emphasis) tried either to be offensive or funny, and accomplished neither. It was negatively compared with WKRP in Cincinnati for its angle in radio and the early emphasis on racy humor, and then with One Day at a Time as writing shifted to Larry bringing up his daughters as a single father. Hello, Larry was canceled in the spring of 1980 after 38 episodes over two seasons.

TV Guide ranked the series No. 12 on their "50 Worst Shows of All Time" list in 2002. The show has been used as shorthand for badness. In one example, from 2000, Arianna Huffington said that "John McCain's return to the Senate will be the chilliest reception for a war hero since McLean Stevenson tried to talk his way back onto M*A*S*H after Hello, Larry tanked."
