= Wendy Fulton =

American actress (born 1954)

- Born: March 26, 1954 (age 72); Stewartstown, Pennsylvania, U.S.
- Other name: Wendy Schultz
- Occupation: Actress
- Years active: 1981–1991
- Spouse: Dwight Schultz (m. 1983)
- Children: 1

Wendy Fulton (born March 26, 1954) is a former American actress, who is known for her roles on television during the 1980s.

== Career ==
Fulton's television credits include guest appearances on Knight Rider, Jake and the Fatman, Diff'rent Strokes, The A-Team, V and Matlock. In 1982, she starred in the CBS soap opera miniseries Bare Essence alongside Linda Evans and Donna Mills. The show later was picked up as a regular series by NBC, but was canceled after a single season. The following year, she had her first and only movie role in the comedy film The First Time.

In 1985, Fulton starred in the ABC miniseries North and South, Book 1. During 1986–87, she played Jean Hackney in the CBS prime time soap opera Knots Landing. Her last role was in 1991.

== Personal life ==
Fulton was born and raised in Stewartstown, Pennsylvania and went to Kennard-Dale High School. Her father was a doctor with a practice in the community. She has been married to actor Dwight Schultz since 1983. They have a daughter named Ava (b. 1987), and currently live in Santa Clarita, California.
