= Gerren Keith =

American television director (born 1941)

- Born: Gerren Frank Keith; March 18, 1941 (age 85); Kansas City, Missouri, U.S.
- Occupation: Television director
- Years active: 1963–2004
- Partner(s): Marian Depass (1965–1968); Laura Shuman (1985–2002; 2 children)

Gerren Frank Keith (born March 18, 1941, in Kansas City, Missouri) is an American television director.

Keith's career began in 1963 serving as the stage manager for the game show Let's Make a Deal. He then stage managed for The Red Skelton Show and The Flip Wilson Show. He made his directorial debut with the sitcom, Grady, a spin-off of Sanford and Son. He then went on to direct episodes of Good Times, Diff'rent Strokes, 227 and Martin, directing the majority of those sitcoms respectively. His other television credits include Valerie, Growing Pains, Family Matters, The Wayans Bros., The Parent 'Hood, The Jamie Foxx Show, Just Shoot Me!, The Parkers and That's So Raven.
