= Dick Bensfield =

American producer and screenwriter

- Born: Richard Edward Bensfield; June 18, 1926; Los Angeles, California, U.S.
- Died: June 24, 2016 (aged 90)
- Occupations: Producer, screenwriter
- Years active: 1952–1987
- Spouse: Donna Bensfield
- Children: 2

Richard Edward Bensfield (June 18, 1926 – June 24, 2016) was an American producer and screenwriter. He is the creator of the American sitcom television series Hello, Larry, which he created with his writing partner Perry Grant.

== Career ==
Bensfield and Grant met in 1952 when both were writing for The Adventures of Ozzie and Harriet. They continued to write for the show until its last season.

Afterwards, Bensfield and Grant continued to work together, producing and writing for television programs including The Andy Griffith Show, The Odd Couple, I Dream of Jeannie, Good Times, Mayberry R.F.D., The Doris Day Show, Happy Days, One Day at a Time, The Partridge Family, The Jeffersons, 227 and The Lucy Show.

In 1979 Bensfield and Grant created the new NBC sitcom television series Hello, Larry, which starred McLean Stevenson, Kim Richards and Joanna Gleason. He retired from television in 1987.

== Death ==
Bensfield died in June 2016, after battling with Parkinson's disease, at the age of 90.
