= Perry Grant =

American producer and screenwriter

- Born: January 26, 1924; San Diego, California, U.S.
- Died: December 12, 2004 (aged 80); Pacific Palisades, California, U.S.
- Education: University of California
- Occupations: Producer, screenwriter
- Years active: 1952–1987
- Spouse: Edie Grant
- Children: 2

Perry Grant (January 26, 1924 – December 12, 2004) was an American producer and screenwriter. He was the co-creator of the American sitcom television series Hello, Larry, which he created with his writing partner Dick Bensfield.

== Early life ==
Grant was born in San Diego, California. He graduated from the University of California, later working for A.O. Smith as the regional advertising manager. During World War II he had served in the Navy in the Pacific, where he wrote humorous magazine stories about life in the navy.

== Career ==
Grant started his screenwriting career in 1952, writing for The Adventures of Ozzie and Harriet, where he met Dick Bensfield. Bensfield and Grant wrote for The Adventures of Ozzie and Harriet until its final season.

Grant and Bensfield later produced and wrote for numerous television programs including The Andy Griffith Show, The Odd Couple, I Dream of Jeannie, Good Times, Mayberry R.F.D., The Doris Day Show, Happy Days, One Day at a Time, The Partridge Family, The Jeffersons, 227 and The Lucy Show.

In 1979 Grant and Bensfield created the new NBC sitcom television series Hello, Larry. He retired from television in 1987.

== Death ==
Grant died in December 2004 of complications from Alzheimer's disease, at his home in Pacific Palisades, California, at the age of 80.
