= Gary Coleman filmography =

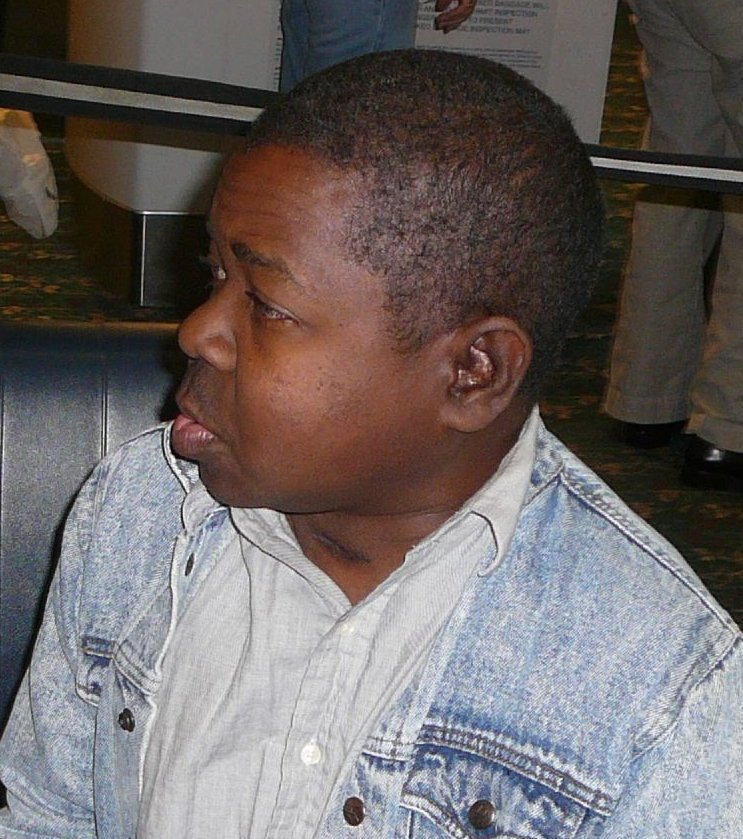
Coleman in 2007

Gary Coleman (1968–2010) was an American actor. This is a list of his works in film, television, video games and music videos.

== Film ==
Year	Title	Role	Notes
1979	The Kid from Left Field	Jackie Robinson "J.R." Cooper	Television film
1980	Scout's Honor	Joey Seymour	Television film
1981	On the Right Track	Lester	First feature film
1982	The Kid with the Broken Halo	Andy LeBeau	Television film
1982	Jimmy the Kid	Jimmy	
1983	The Kid with the 200 I.Q.	Nick Newell	Television film
1984	The Fantastic World of D.C. Collins	D. C. Collins	Television film
1985	Playing with Fire	David Phillips	Television film
1994	Party	The Liar	Short film Associate producer
1994	S.F.W.	Himself	Cameo
1996	Fox Hunt	Murray Lipschitz Jr.	
1997	Off the Menu: The Last Days of Chasen's	Himself	Documentary film
1998	Dirty Work	Himself	Cameo
1998	Like Father, Like Santa	Ignatius	Television film
1999	Shafted!	Himself	Cameo
2000	The Flunky	Himself	
2002	Frank McKlusky, C.I.	Himself	Cameo
2003	Dickie Roberts: Former Child Star	Himself	Cameo
2003	A Carol Christmas	Ghost of Christmas Past	Television film
2004	Chasing the Edge	Himself	Short film, cameo
2004	Save Virgil	Himself / The Devil	
2005	A Christmas Too Many	Pizza Delivery Guy	
2006	Church Ball	Charles Higgins	
2008	An American Carol	Bacon Stains Malone	
2009	Midgets vs. Mascots	Gary	Final film appearance

== Television ==
Title	Year	Role	Notes
Medical Center	1974	James	Season 5, Episode 24: "Appointment with Danger"
The Little Rascals	1977	Stymie	TV pilots
The Jeffersons	1978	Raymond Jefferson	Season 4, Episode 22: "Uncle George and Aunt Louise"
Good Times	1978	Gary	Season 5, Episode 24: "That's Entertainment, Evans Style"; Season 6, Episode 5: "Florida Gets a Job"
Diff'rent Strokes	1978–1986	Arnold Jackson	Main role (181 episodes)
Hello, Larry	1979	Arnold Jackson	Season 1, Episode 10: "The Trip: Part 2"; Season 2, Episode 1: "Feudin' and Fussin': Part 2"; Season 2, Episode 10: "Thanksgiving Crossover: Part 2"
Buck Rogers in the 25th Century	1979–1980	Hieronymus Fox	Season 1, Episode 9: "The Cosmic Wiz Kid"; Season 1, Episode 14: "A Blast for Buck"
The Facts of Life	1979–1980	Arnold Jackson	Season 1, Episode 1: "Rough Housing"; Season 2, Episode 1: "The New Girl: Part 1"
Lucy Moves to NBC	1980	V.P. of Programming	TV special
The Gary Coleman Show	1982–1983	Andy LeBeau (voice)	Main role (13 episodes)
Silver Spoons	1982	Arnold Jackson	Season 1, Episode 7: "The Great Computer Caper"
Simon & Simon	1986	Lewis Peoples	Season 6, Episode 8: "Like Father, Like Son"
Amazing Stories	1986	Arnold Jackson	Season 1, Episode 10: "Remote Control Man"
Couch Potatoes	1989	Himself	Episode: "Bosom Buds vs. Mod Squad"
227	1990	Otis P. Bigg (a.k.a. Mr. Bigg)	Season 5, Episode 17: "Knock It Off"
The Ben Stiller Show	1992	Himself	Season 1, Episode 8: "With Flea"; Season 1, Episode 9: "With Garry Shandling"
The Wayans Bros.	1995	Himself	Season 1, Episode 1: "Goop, Hair-It-Is"
Married... with Children	1994–1996	Property Inspector; Reverend	Season 8, Episode 16: "How Green Was My Apple"; Season 10, Episode 27: "The Joke's on Al"
Martin	1995	Mad Dog No Good	Season 3, Episode 20: "High Noon as Mad Dog No Good"
Unhappily Ever After	1995	The Devil	Season 2, Episode 12: "Hot Wheels"
The Fresh Prince of Bel-Air	1996	Arnold Jackson-Drummond	Season 6, Episode 24: "I, Done: Part 2"
Sherman Oaks	1996	Himself	Season 2, Episode 6: "Whatchoo Talkin' 'Bout, Al Capone?"; Season 2, Episode 19: "Annoying Poets Society"
Waynehead	1996–1997	Kevin (voice)	Recurring role (5 episodes)
The Parent 'Hood	1996	Himself	Season 3, Episode 22: "Rappin' It Up"
Homeboys in Outer Space	1997	Snafu	Season 1, Episode 20: "How the West Was Lost, or Daddy's Home"
The Naked Truth	1998	Himself	Season 3, Episode 17: Born to Be Wilde
Shasta McNasty	1999	Himself	Season 1, Episode 2: "Little Dude"
The Simpsons	1999–2001	Himself (voice)	Season 11, Episode 9: "Grift of the Magi"; Season 12, Episode 2: "A Tale of Two Springfields"; Season 12, Episode 13: "Day of the Jackanapes"
The Jamie Foxx Show	2000	Cupid	Season 5, Episode 9: "Cupid"
Son of the Beach	2000–2002	Barker; Saltine Cracker	Season 1, Episode 12: "Attack of the Cocktopuss"; Season 3, Episode 11: "The Long Hot Johnson"
The Drew Carey Show	2001	Drew's Double	Season 6, Episode 21: "What's Wrong with this Episode? IV"
The Hughleys	2001	Himself	Season 4, Episode 8: "Whatchoo Stalkin' About, Willis?"
Night of the Living Doo	2001	Himself (voice)	TV special
My Wife and Kids	2001	Himself	Season 2, Episode 2: "Mom's Away: Part 2"; Season 2, Episode 4: "Perfect Dad"
Baby Bob	2002	Himself	Season 1, Episode 5: "House of the Rising Son"
The Rerun Show	2002	Security Guard	Season 1, Episode 2: "The Facts of Life: Shoplifting/The Jeffersons: A Bedtime Story"
BattleBots	2002	Himself	Main role (5 episodes)
Star Dates	2003	Himself	Season 1, Episode 6: "Gary Coleman"
The Parkers	2002	Himself	Season 4, Episode 8: "It's Gary Coleman"
The Surreal Life	2004	Himself	Season 2, Episode 2: "Mel's Dinner"
Drake & Josh	2004	Himself	Season 2, Episode 12: "The Gary Grill"
Penn & Teller: Bullshit!	2009	Himself	Season 7, Episode 4: "The Apocalypse"
Nitro Circus	2009	Himself	Episodes: "Hits and Misses", "Hollywood Nitro"
The Horrible Terrible Misadventures of David Atkins	2010	Himself	Season 1, Episode 1: "Welcome to Atkins Land"
Robot Chicken	2011	Various characters (voice)	Season 5, Episode 9: "No Country for Old Dogs"; Final role; Posthumous release

== Video games ==
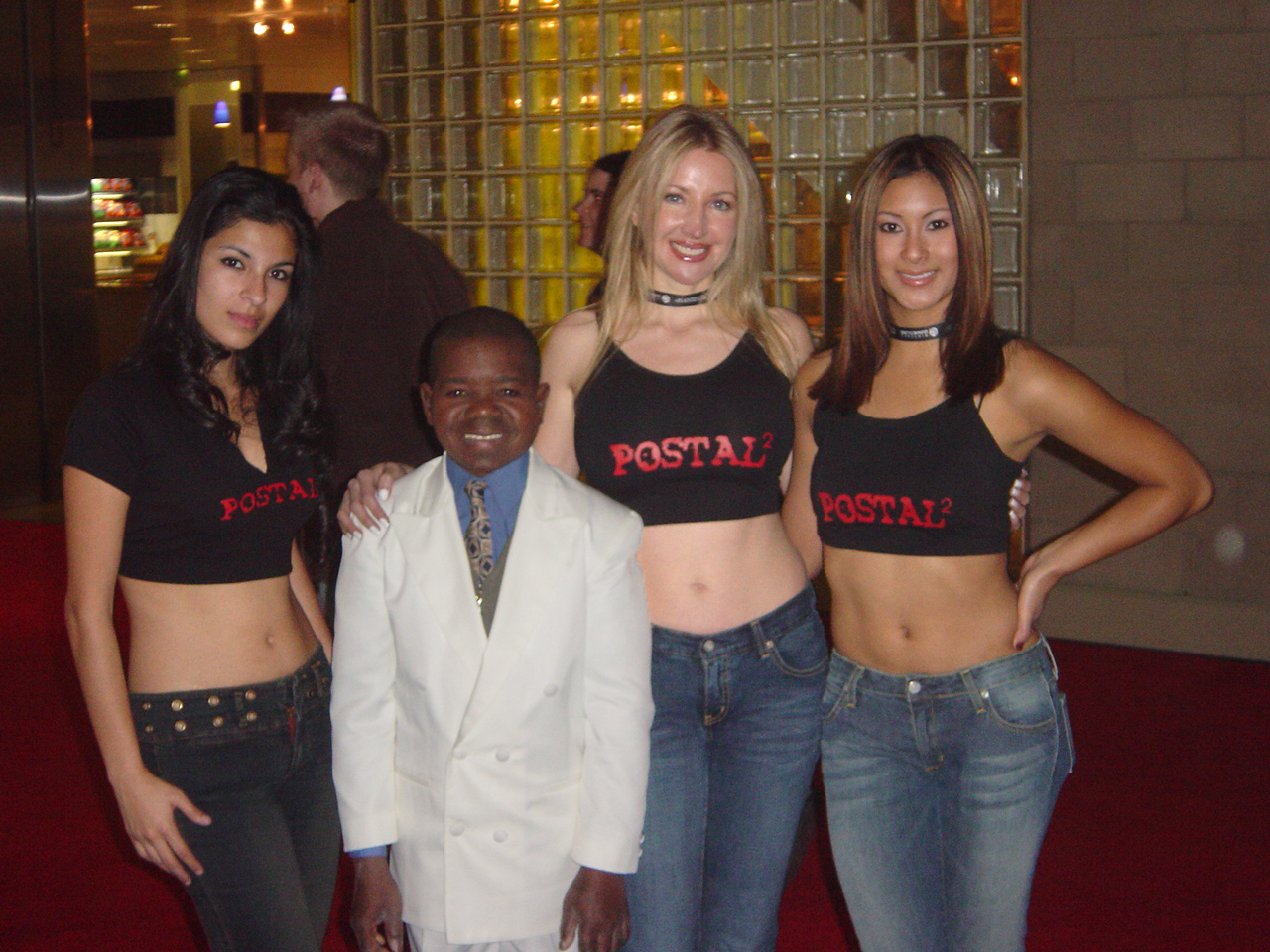
Coleman promoting Postal 2 at E3 in Los Angeles, California, on May 15, 2003

Year	Title	Role	Notes
1997	The Curse of Monkey Island	Kenny Falmouth	
2003	Postal 2	Himself	
2015	Postal 2: Paradise Lost	Himself	DLC expansion of Postal 2 Posthumous release Archival recordings

== Music videos ==
- John Cena – "Bad, Bad Man" as himself
- 'N Sync – "Merry Christmas, Happy Holidays" as Santa's elf
- Kid Rock – "Cowboy" as himself
- Moby – "We Are All Made of Stars" as himself
- Raging Slab – "Anywhere But Here" as himself
- Slum Village – "Climax" as himself
