= Lopopolo =

Lopopolo is a surname. Notable people with the surname include:

- Sandro Lopopolo (1939–2014), Italian boxer
- Toni Lopopolo, a literary agent
