= The Kid from Left Field =

The Kid from Left Field may refer to:

- The Kid from Left Field (1953 film), a baseball comedy film
- The Kid from Left Field (1979 film), an American made-for-television baseball comedy film
