= Master of Professional Writing Program =

A Master of Professional Writing Program is a type of graduate degree program in professional writing. Chatham University in Pennsylvania has an online MPW program. The University of Southern California's MPW program ended in May 2016, at which point it moved to the Vermont College of Fine Arts under the new name the School of Writing and Publishing.

== Notable alumni of the USC program ==
- Millicent Borges Accardi, poet and recipient of a National Endowment for the Arts fellowship, author of four poetry books
- Mark Andrus, author of As Good as It Gets and Life as a House
- Margaret Davis, author of biographies of William Mulholland and Edward L. Doheny
- Frederick Johnson, Emmy- and WGA Award-winning writer of daytime television serials
- Charlotte Laws, author and animal rights advocate
- EM Lewis, playwright
- Sandra Tsing Loh, radio commentator and author
- Gina Nahai, author of Cry of the Peacock
- Greg Rucka, writer of novels and comic books
- Ann Seaman, author of biographies of Jimmy Swaggart and Madalyn Murray O'Hair
- Charles Harper Webb, poet, Guggenheim Fellow
- Lee Wochner, playwright

== Notable faculty of the USC program ==
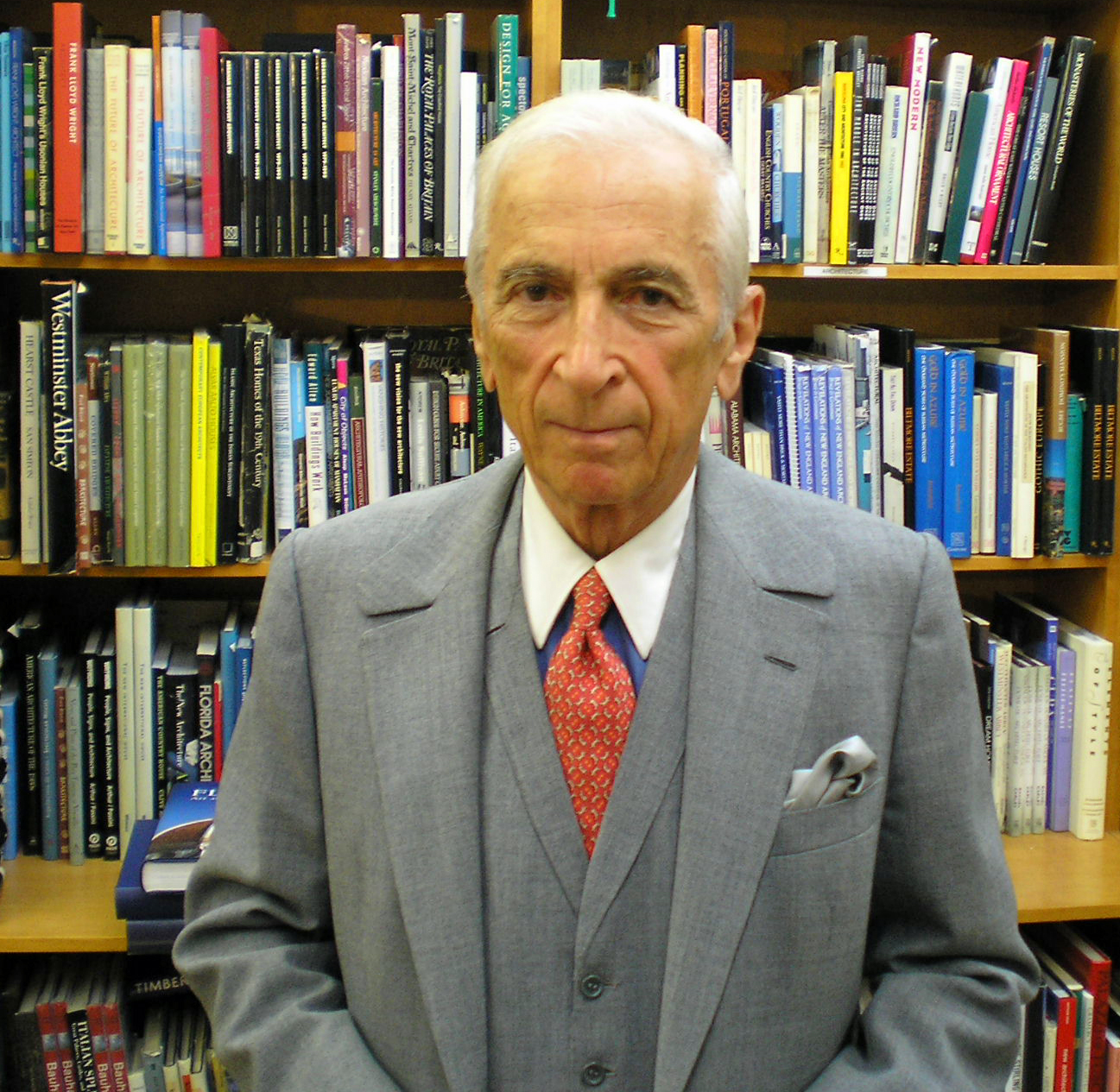
Gay Talese at the Strand Bookstore in New York City

- Shelley Berman, humor writing
- Nan Cohen, poetry
- Syd Field, screenwriting
- Janet Fitch, fiction
- Noel Riley Fitch, non-fiction
- Donald Freed, playwriting
- Amy Gerstler, poetry
- Dana Goodyear, non-fiction
- Janet Irvin, fiction
- Marty Isenberg, animation
- Irvin Kershner, cinema/TV
- Jerome Lawrence, playwriting
- Dinah Lenney, non-fiction
- Gerald Locklin, poetry, fiction
- Larry the Cable Guy, cinema/TV
- MG Lord, non-fiction
- Shelly Lowenkopf, fiction, publishing
- David Scott Milton, playwriting
- Gina Nahai, fiction
- Gabrielle Pina, fiction
- Robert Pirosh, cinema/TV
- Beata Pozniak, drama/film/TV
- Michael Price, animation writing
- James Ragan, poetry and program director for 25 years
- John Rechy, fiction
- Aram Saroyan, poetry, fiction
- Sy Gomberg, screenwriter
- Hubert Selby Jr., fiction
- Melville Shavelson, cinema/TV
- Gay Talese, non-fiction
- Shirley Thomas, technical writing
- Kenneth Turan, film
- Lee Wochner, playwriting
- Richard Yates, fiction
