= Kari Michaelsen =

American actress

- Born: Kari Markussen; November 3, 1961 (age 64); Manhattan, New York, U.S.
- Occupations: Actress, motivational speaker
- Years active: 1976–2001 (Acting); 1990–present (Motivational speaking)
- Spouse: David Waldock (m. 2002; div. 2009)
- Children: 1
- Website: http://www.karimichaelsen.com

Kari Michaelsen (born Kari Markussen; November 3, 1961) is a former American actress, television personality, and motivational speaker. She is best known for her role as Katie Kanisky on the NBC sitcom Gimme a Break! (1981–1987).

== Biography ==
Born in Manhattan, Michaelsen followed her parents into show business. Her father, Arne Markussen, was a singer; and her mother, Roberta Stevenson, was a dancer. She sang on the soundtrack for Sesame Street and was performing in Off-Broadway plays by age 11. In 1975, her family moved to Beverly Hills, and Michaelsen (who changed her name from Markussen) began appearing on television shows such as, Diff'rent Strokes and Eight Is Enough.

Michaelsen graduated from Beverly Hills High School in 1979 and studied at University of California, Los Angeles. She retired from television work in 2001. Kari has been doing public speaking and hosting educational seminars since 1990. She married David Waldock, a Mercedes-Benz executive, in July 2002. Michaelsen and Waldock divorced in 2009. They have a son named Nickolas.

Michaelsen dated pop star Andy Gibb in 1983. Michaelsen is longtime friends with retired actress Kristy McNichol.

== Filmography ==
=== Film ===
Year	Title	Role	Notes
1976	Joy Ride: An Auto Theft	Kari	Short
1981	Saturday the 14th	Debbie Hyatt	
1984	Terror in the Aisles	Herself	
1989	Girl Talk	Marcia	

=== Television ===
Year	Title	Role	Notes
1980	Scared Straight! Another Story		Television film
1980	Diff'rent Strokes	Ellen Marshall	Episode: "Little Mother"
1980	ABC Afterschool Special	Karala Murtaugh	Episode: "The Gymnast"
1981	The Choice	Teenager	Television film
1981	Eight Is Enough	Lisa	Episode: "Vows"
1981	CHiPs	Teri	Episode: "Karate"
1981	The Incredible Hulk	Linda	Episode: "The First: Part 1"
1981-86	Gimme a Break!	Kathleen "Katie" Kanisky	Main role
1981-1983	Rosie	Kelly Larson	25 episodes
1982	Fantasy Island	Cassie	1 episode
1983	The Kid with the 200 I.Q.	Julie Gordon	Television film
1983	ABC Afterschool Special	Fran Davies	Episode: "Have You Ever Been Ashamed of Your Parents?"
1983	Hart to Hart	Lisa Carrigan	Episode: "Trust Your Hart"
1989	Full House	Stacey Fleetwood	Episode: "Joey & Stacy and... Oh, Yeah, Jesse"

== Awards and nominations ==
Year	Award	Category	Title of work	Result
1983	Young Artist Award	Best Young Actress in a Comedy Series	Gimme a Break!	Nominated
1984	Young Artist Award	Best Young Actress in a Movie Made for Television	The Kid with the 200 I.Q.	Nominated
