= Gary (film) =

2024 film directed by Robin Dashwood

- Film poster
- Directed by: Robin Dashwood
- Edited by: Kevin Austin
- Music by: Alexander Parsons
- Distributed by: Peacock
- Release date: August 29, 2024
- Running time: 91 minutes
- Country: United States
- Language: English

Gary is a 2024 American documentary film about the life of actor Gary Coleman. Directed by Robin Dashwood, the film was released on Peacock on August 29, 2024.

== Reception ==
On the review aggregator website Rotten Tomatoes, 90% of 10 critics' reviews are positive, with an average rating of 7.1/10.
