= Jimmy the Kid =

- Directed by: Gary Nelson
- Written by: Sam Bobrick
- Based on: Jimmy the Kid novel by Donald E. Westlake
- Produced by: Ronald Jacobs
- Starring: Gary Coleman; Paul Le Mat; Ruth Gordon; Dee Wallace; Walter Olkewicz; Don Adams
- Cinematography: Dennis Dalzell
- Edited by: Richard C. Meyer
- Music by: John Cameron
- Production company: Zephyr Productions
- Distributed by: New World Pictures
- Release date: November 12, 1982
- Running time: 85 minutes
- Country: United States
- Language: English
- Budget: $800,000
- Box office: $5 million or $2.6 million

Jimmy the Kid is a 1982 American comedy film starring Gary Coleman and Paul Le Mat. It was directed by Gary Nelson, produced by Ronald Jacobs, and released on November 12, 1982 by New World Pictures. Following 1981's On the Right Track, it was the second theatrical film release starring Coleman.

== Plot ==
An ex-convict and his three inept helpers kidnap a rich kid who likes to talk.

== Cast ==
- Gary Coleman as Jimmy
- Paul Le Mat as John Dortmunder
- Ruth Gordon as Bernice
- Dee Wallace as May
- Cleavon Little as Herb
- Don Adams as Harry Walker
- Pat Morita as Maurice
- Fay Hauser as Nina
- Avery Schreiber as Dr. Stevens
- Walter Olkewicz as Kelp

== Production ==
The film was based on the 1974 novel of the same name by Donald E. Westlake. It was the third book of Westlake's Dortmunder series. One of the shooting locations was Bob Hope's Malibu Canyon plantation.

== Reception ==
Jimmy the Kid grossed $5 million at the box office.

=== Critical response ===
Overall, critical reception of the family-friendly comedy was on the negative side. Critic Gene Siskel, who called himself "one of few Americans who publicly declared his affection for On the Right Track" concluded that Coleman's follow-up was "definitely on the wrong track." Siskel's TV counterpart Roger Ebert also found little to like in the film, but admitted that kids may well enjoy it.

Stephen Hunter of The Baltimore Sun wrote in his review: "Jimmy the Kid proves a longstanding cinema law: Any movie calling itself a "comedy crime caper" is likely to be a misdemeanor against good taste."

Carter Colwell of The Daytona Beach News-Journal wrote in his review: "ONCE UPON a time, Donald E. Westlake wrote a bunch of funny mystery stories. And then one day, he wrote one that was not very funny, but it was still pretty funny. In it, a bunch of klutzy burglars decide to conduct a kidnapping, following a plan laid out in a book one of them has read. And then Donald E. Westlake sold his pretty funny kidnapping story to Hollywood. And they made a movie out of it. It was called Jimmy the Kid. It was not very funny. And it was not pretty funny either."

The Philadelphia Inquirer Staff of The Philadelphia Inquirer wrote in their review: "Jimmy the Kid combines elements of Coco the Clown, Carnac the Magnificent, and the Pink Panther into Movie the Bad. Someone wisely kept this weak Gary Coleman comedy about an overly mature rich kid in the can since 1981."

== Release ==
Jimmy the Kid was released in theatres on November 12, 1982. Jimmy the Kid was released on VHS.
