= Lee Wochner =

American dramatist

Lee Wochner is a Los Angeles, California-based playwright, producer, and theatre director.

In 1992, he co-founded Moving Arts Theatre, where he served as founding artistic director from 1992 to 2002. While at Moving Arts, he produced or directed plays by Luis Alfaro, John Belluso, Sheila Callaghan, Michael T. Folie, Trey Nichols, Werner Trieschmann and many others. Moving Arts has also produced a number of Wochner's plays including All Undressed with Nowhere to Go for the critically acclaimed Car Plays series.

His plays, including Anapest, Happy Fun Family, The Size of Pike, Remember Frank Zappa, and others, have been produced in New York, London, Los Angeles, and elsewhere.

In 1999 he co-executive-produced the Regional Alternative Theatre Conference (or "rat conference") in Los Angeles.

From 2001 to 2003 he was President and CEO of LA Stage Alliance, and from 2002 to 2004 he was president of California Arts Advocates.

He has taught playwriting since 1990, first at various writers conferences, then at Pierce College, California State University Northridge, Glendale Community College, and in his private Words That Speak workshop. Since 2001 he has taught playwriting in the Master of Professional Writing Program at the University of Southern California, where he received his master's degree in 1990.
