= Scout's Honor (1980 film) =

1980 American made-for-television film

- Genre: Comedy; Drama; Family
- Written by: Bennett Foster
- Directed by: Henry Levin
- Starring: Gary Coleman; Katherine Helmond; Pat O'Brien; Harry Morgan
- Music by: Mike Post
- Country of origin: United States
- Original language: English

Production
- Executive producer: Jimmy Hawkins
- Producers: Jim Begg; Nancy Geller; James Ragan
- Production location: Los Angeles
- Cinematography: Gary Graver
- Editor: Ed Cotter
- Running time: 100 minutes
- Production companies: Jimmy Hawkins Company; Zephyr Productions

Original release
- Network: NBC
- Release: September 30, 1980

Scout's Honor is a 1980 American made-for-television comedy drama film starring Gary Coleman, Katherine Helmond, Wilfrid Hyde-White, Pat O'Brien and Harry Morgan. It was broadcast September 30, 1980 on NBC.

Director Henry Levin died after suffering a heart attack while on location on May 1, 1980.

== Plot ==
Gary Coleman stars as little Joey Seymour, a clever but lonely orphan shuffled from one foster home to the next, who is also determined to be the best Cub Scout ever. Pearl Bartlett (Katherine Helmond) is a hard-working executive who dislikes children, but she must take on a troop of Cub Scouts and become a den mother to save her job.

On an outing, she takes her den to a nearby park where the boys discover a cave and decide to explore. By accident, they cause a "cave-in" and the excitement begins. But little Joey saves the day, and in the process, teaches Pearl the true meaning of caring. Pearl returns the favor as she offers Joey the best gift a deserving orphan could get: she officially adopts him.

== Cast ==
- Gary Coleman as Joey Seymour
- Katherine Helmond as Pearl Bartlett
- Wilfrid Hyde-White as Uncle Toby 'Nuncle' Bartlett
- Pat O'Brien as Mr. Caboose
- Harry Morgan as Mr. Briggs
- Eric Taslitz as Grogan
- Meeno Peluce as Big Ace
- Marcello Krakoff as Little Ace
- John Louie as Patrick
- Angela Cartwright as Alfredo's Mom
- Lauren Chapin as Ace's Mom
- Jay North as Grogan's Dad
- Paul Petersen as Ace's Dad
- Joanna Moore as Ms. Odom
- Peter Hobbs as U.S. President
- Wesley Pfenning as Ms. Lopes (as Wesley Ann Pfenning)
- Robert Trujillo as Boy Scout
- Basil Hoffman as Alexander
- Rance Howard as Captain
- Al Fann as Mr. Prewitt
- Shelley Oloport as Linda
- Bobby Lento as Football Player
- Shavar Ross as Joey's Schoolmate

== Production ==
Filming took place in April 1980 during a hiatus from Diff'rent Strokes which enabled Coleman to star. The movie's premiere coincided with the 50th anniversary of the introduction of the cub scouts of America. Katherine Helmond pitched her performance deliberately different from that of Jessica on Soap, which upset the producers and the network. "To me, playing Jessica would've been a cheap way out," said Helmond. "This is a lot more fun."

== Reception ==
The Los Angeles Times said the film "rambles a bit but it's a warm, sentimental offering designed for Gary Coleman fans."

The film registered a 17% share in Los Angeles. It screened up against the TV movie Playing for Time which earned a 35% share.
