= Shirley Thomas (USC professor) =

- Born: 1920
- Died: July 21, 2005 (aged 84–85); Los Angeles, California
- Occupation: Professor
- Writing career
- Genre: Technical Writing
- Notable work: Men of Space

Shirley Thomas (1920 – July 21, 2005), also known as Shirley Thomas Perkins, was a radio/television actress/writer/producer, author, and professor in the Master of Professional Writing Program at the University of Southern California. In 2010, The Aerospace Historical Society established the Shirley Thomas Academic Scholarship. It is "presented annually at the International von Kármán Wings Award banquet to a student in aerospace engineering or a related science that shows promise for continued future contributions to the field."

== Personal life ==
Thomas was born in Glendale, California, the daughter of an electrical engineer and a homemaker. She earned her B.A. in 1960 and her Ph.D. in communications in 1967 from the University of Sussex. She was also awarded a diploma by the Russian Federation of Cosmonautics in 1995. She died of cancer on July 21, 2005, in Los Angeles, California.

== Career ==
Thomas' career spanned a number of disciplines, most notably entertainment and aerospace.

=== Entertainment career ===
Active in Hollywood for a number of decades, Thomas conducted red carpet interviews at motion picture premieres and special event broadcasts from 1952 to 1956. She was also involved in the coverage of the New Year's Day Rose Parade for CBS and later did broadcasts for Voice of America.

=== Aerospace career ===
Thomas authored 15 books, including her eight-volume series on astronauts, Men of Space (published between 1960 and 1968). She also organized and chaired the Woman's Space Symposia from 1962 to 1973. In 1961, Thomas was the recipient of the Air Force Association's Airpower Arts and Letters Award and, in 1991, she received the Aerospace Excellence Award from the California Museum Foundation. She was a fellow in the British Interplanetary Society and acted as a consultant for the Stanford Research Institute (SRI) and Jet Propulsion Laboratory (JPL).

Beginning in the 1970s, Thomas organized the Theodore von Karman Stamp committee, succeeding in 1992 in getting a U.S. stamp issued in his honor. She also founded and chaired the Aerospace Historical Society, an organization that. since 1985, has presented the international Von Karman Wings award to outstanding and innovative contributors to the world of aerospace.

=== Technical writing ===
Thomas, an associate fellow and advocate for the national Society for Technical Communication (as well as the local Los Angeles chapter, LASTC) taught Technical and Fundamental Writing in the Master of Professional Writing Program at the University of Southern California for more than three decades.

== Works ==
- The Thomas mss., Manuscripts Department, Lilly Library, Indiana University
- Men of Space: Profiles of the Leaders in Space Research, Development, and Exploration, vol. 1–8, (1960–1968).
- Theodore von Kármán Memorial Seminar, 1965: Proceedings of the Seminar ... Held in Los Angeles 12 May 1965 (1966).
- Computers: Their History, Present Applications, and Future (1965).
- Satellite Tracking Facilities (1963).
