= Gary Coleman =

American actor (1968–2010)

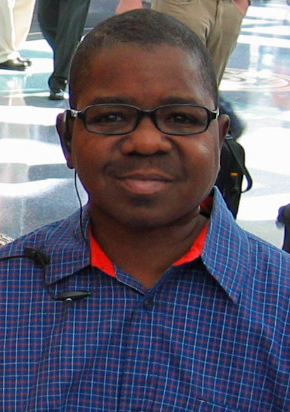
- Coleman in 2005
- Born: Gary Wayne Coleman; February 8, 1968; Zion, Illinois, U.S.
- Died: May 28, 2010 (aged 42); Provo, Utah, U.S.
- Occupation: Actor
- Years active: 1974–2010
- Works: Full list
- Spouse: Shannon Price (m. 2007; div. 2008)
- Partner: Shannon Price (2008–2010)

Gary Wayne Coleman (February 8, 1968 – May 28, 2010) was an American actor, known as a high-profile child star of the late 1970s and 1980s. Born in Zion, Illinois, Coleman grew up with his adoptive parents. Due to the corticosteroids and other medications used to treat a kidney disease, his growth was limited to 4 ft 8 in (142 cm). In the mid-1970s, he appeared in commercials and acted in an episode of Medical Center. He caught the attention of a producer after acting in a pilot for a revival of The Little Rascals (1977), who decided to cast him as Arnold Jackson in the sitcom Diff'rent Strokes (1978–1986), a role that launched Coleman into stardom. For playing the role of Arnold he received several accolades, which include two Young Artist Awards; in 1980 for Outstanding Contribution to Youth Through Entertainment and in 1982 for Best Young Actor in a Comedy Series; and three People's Choice Awards; consecutive three wins for Favorite Young TV Performer from 1980 to 1983; as well as nominations for two TV Land Awards. He was rated first on a list of VH1's "100 Greatest Kid Stars", and an influential child actor.

Coleman was the highest-paid child actor on television throughout the late 1970s and 1980s. During his prime, he reprised the role of Jackson in Hello, Larry (1979), The Facts of Life (1979–1980), Silver Spoons (1982), and Amazing Stories (1985). He acted in high-profile television series such as The Jeffersons, Good Times (both 1978), Buck Rogers in the 25th Century (1979–1980), and Simon & Simon (1986). He starred in the television films The Kid from Left Field (1979), Scout's Honor (1980), The Kid with the Broken Halo (1982), The Kid with the 200 I.Q. (1983), The Fantastic World of D.C. Collins (1984), and Playing with Fire (1985). Additionally, he was the star of his own Saturday morning cartoon The Gary Coleman Show (1982). He also headlined two motion pictures, On the Right Track (1981) and Jimmy the Kid (1982), both financial successes.

Coleman struggled financially in later life; in 1989, he successfully sued his parents and business adviser over misappropriation of his assets, only to declare bankruptcy a decade later. Very few details of Coleman's medical history have been made public, although his battles with issues such as growth deficiency, substance abuse, and depression during his life earned significant media coverage. Moving forward, a lot of his acting career consisted of him playing himself in guest appearances on television shows and films. He played roles in various television shows and films, which were rarely recurring roles. He also provided his acting talents to two video games, The Curse of Monkey Island (1997) and Postal 2 (2003).

Coleman died at Utah Valley Regional Medical Center in Provo, Utah, on May 28, 2010, aged 42. He had been admitted two days earlier after falling down the stairs at his home in Santaquin and striking his head, resulting in an epidural hematoma.

== Early life ==
Gary Wayne Coleman was born on February 8, 1968, in Zion, Illinois. He was adopted by W. G. Coleman, a fork-lift operator, and Edmonia Sue, a nurse practitioner. Due to focal segmental glomerulosclerosis, a kidney disease, and the corticosteroids and other medications used to treat it, his growth was limited to 4 ft 8 in (142 cm), and his face kept a childlike appearance even into adulthood.

== Career ==
=== 1974–1985: Early works and stardom ===
In 1974, Coleman's career began when he appeared in a commercial for Harris Bank. His line (after the announcer said, "You should have a Harris banker") was "You should have a Hubert doll." "Hubert" was a stuffed lion representing the Harris bank logo. The same year, he appeared in an episode of Medical Center.

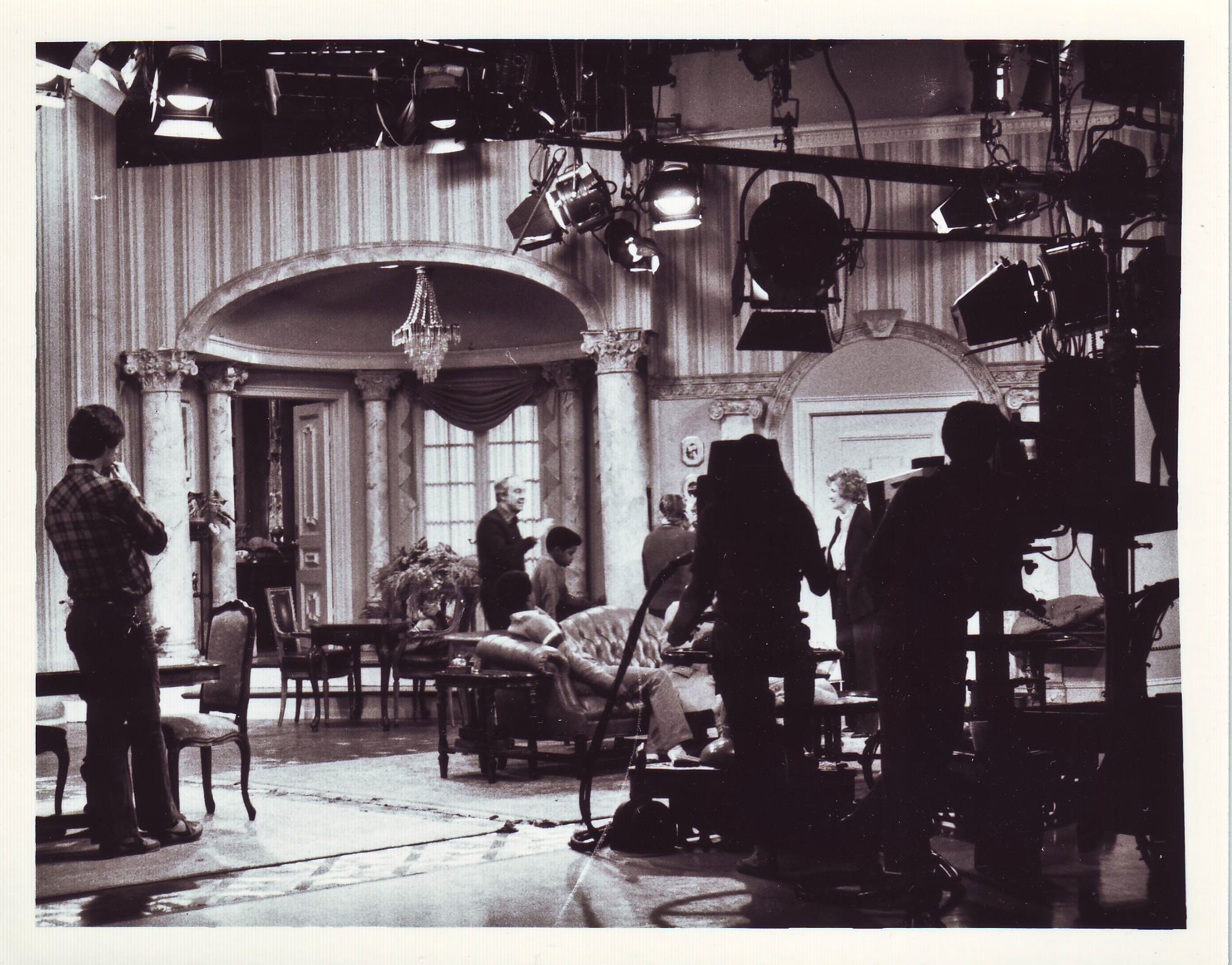
Conrad Bain and Coleman on the set of Diff'rent Strokes

In 1977, Coleman appeared in a pilot for a revival of The Little Rascals as Stymie, which ultimately ended up not getting picked up as a series. His work on the Little Rascals pilot caught the attention of an executive, and in 1978 Coleman was cast as Arnold Jackson in Diff'rent Strokes, playing one of two black brothers from Harlem adopted by a wealthy white widower in Manhattan. After the premiere, Diff'rent Strokes became a hit, and ran for eight seasons, ending in 1986.

Coleman received recognition and praise for his work on Diff'rent Strokes; for his role he received five Young Artist Award nominations, of which he won two, and won the People's Choice Awards for Favorite Young TV Performer four years in a row, from 1980 to 1983. At the height of his fame on Diff'rent Strokes, he earned $100,000 ($388,105.58 in 2025) per episode, and he became known for his character's catchphrase "What'chu talkin' 'bout, Willis?", uttered skeptically in response to statements by his brother Willis, who was portrayed by Todd Bridges. According to Bridges' autobiography Killing Willis, Coleman was forced to work long hours on the set of Diff'rent Strokes despite his age and debilitating health problems, which contributed to him feeling depressed and withdrawn from the rest of the cast. A Biography Channel documentary estimated that Coleman was left with a quarter of the original amount of money he received from his years on Diff'rent Strokes after paying his parents, advisers, lawyers, and taxes. In 1989, Coleman sued his adoptive parents and former business advisor for $3.8 million for misappropriating his trust fund and won a $1.28 million (approximately $2,846,895 in 2025 adjusting for inflation) judgment in 1993.

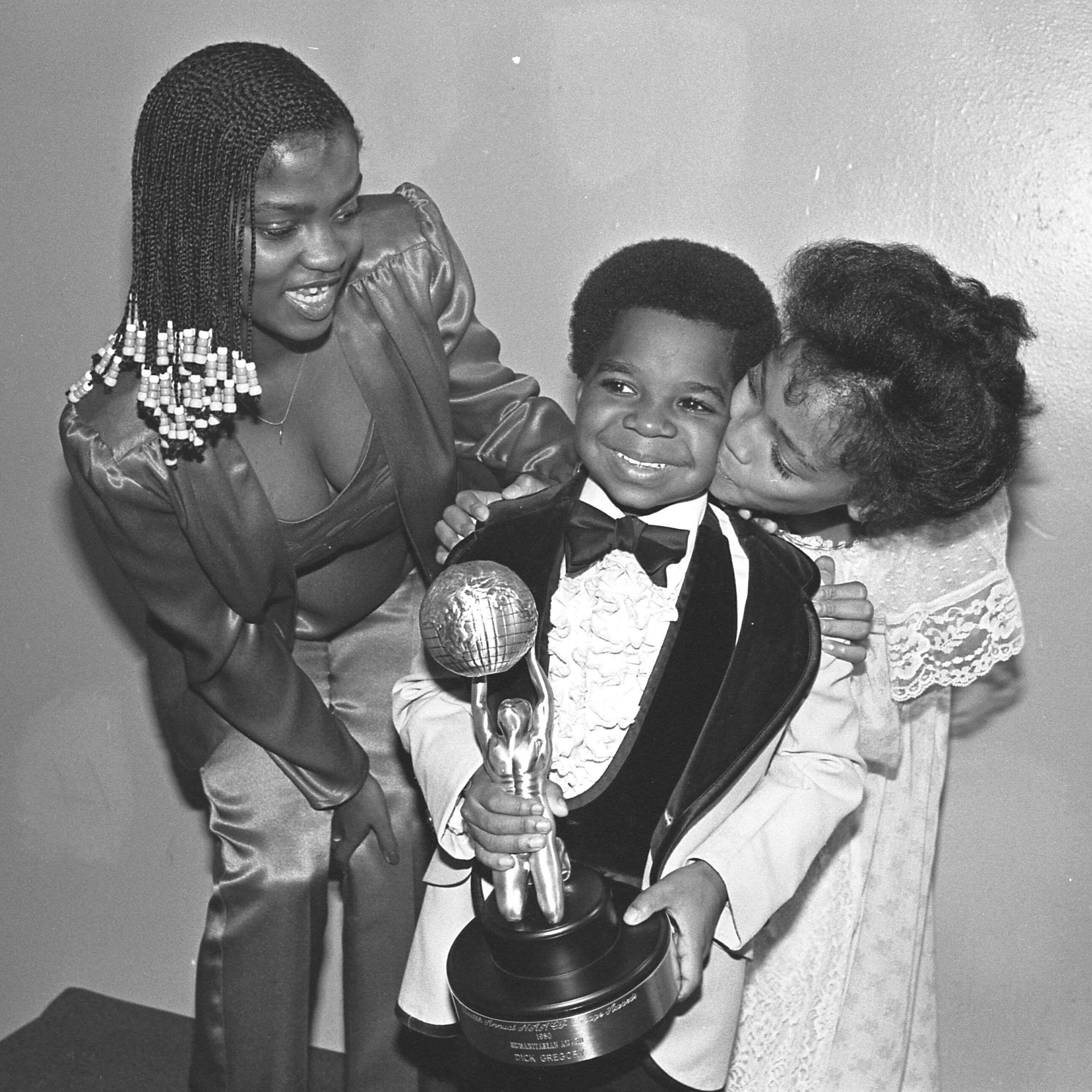
Coleman accepting an NAACP Image Award for The Kid from Left Field in 1980, pictured alongside Danielle Spencer and Kim Fields

In 1978, Coleman acted in one episode of The Jeffersons, and two of Good Times.. Coleman also made his first appearance on The Tonight Show in late 1978. In 1979, Coleman made his television film debut playing the lead in The Kid from Left Field, a baseball comedy. The television film was made by NBC to enhance Coleman's name recognition and boost his commercial value. It was the 15th highest-rated prime time show of the week, with a Nielsen rating of 21.4. In that same year, he acted in "Cosmic Whiz Kid" an episode of the first season of science-fiction show Buck Rogers in the 25th Century as a time-displaced whiz kid; and appeared later in that season, in a 1980 episode named "A Blast for Buck". In 1980, Coleman played the lead in the television film Scout's Honor.

In 1981, Coleman made his feature film debut with the comedy On the Right Track, headlining as Lester, a young shoeshine orphan who lives in a locker in a train station, who achieves fame for having an uncanny talent for gambling on horses. Coleman's mother explained that "it was a script written some time ago for someone else, it was rewritten for Gary, reconstructed for him. It was one of several ideas presented us for him. Gary has a very big love for trains, and we thought this might be a good one for him to do". Though it received a number of reviews concluding that it was sappy and capitalizing on Coleman's TV following, many found the film charming, well written, well acted, with Coleman being a solid actor in his first lead role in a motion picture. The film was a financial success, it grossed $13 million at the box office ranking it at 61 on highest grosses of that year. Home video rentals of the film added $10 to $15 millions to the gross income.

In 1982, Coleman starred in Jimmy the Kid. The film was financially successful, but received resoundingly negative reviews, with critic Roger Ebert writing "... movies like this don't really have room for brilliant performances. They're written by formula, cast by computer and directed by the book, and when a little spontaneity creeps in, it seems out of place." On April 4 of that year, Coleman starred in the television film The Kid with the Broken Halo. The film served as the basis for Saturday morning cartoon The Gary Coleman Show, which started that year on September 11, where Coleman had the lead voice role as Andy LeBeau, an angel in training who comes to earth to help others and gain his wings. Finally in 1982, Coleman played Arnold Jackson in a crossover episode of Silver Spoons.

Moving forward, Coleman played the lead in the comedic television films The Kid with the 200 I.Q. (1983), and The Fantastic World of D.C. Collins (1984). In 1985, Coleman played a teenage arsonist in the television film Playing with Fire. It was his first dramatic project. In 1986, Coleman hosted the made-for-home video educational film Gary Coleman: For Safety's Sake, in it Coleman provides various safety advice around a home.

=== 1986–2010: Work as an adult and politics ===
When Diff'rent Strokes was cancelled in 1986 after eight seasons due to low ratings, Coleman went on a hiatus. Like his Diff’rent Strokes co-stars, he struggled with finding acting roles. From thereon, the majority of Coleman's adult roles were single appearances in television sitcom episodes. He played himself in The Ben Stiller Show, The Jackie Thomas Show, Sherman Oaks, The Parent 'Hood, The Wayans Bros., The Naked Truth, Shasta McNasty, The Simpsons, My Wife and Kids, The Hughleys, Baby Bob, The Parkers, and Drake & Josh. Shows where he played a character were 227, Martin, Unhappily Ever After, The Fresh Prince of Bel-Air (his last appearance as Arnold Jackson), Married... with Children, Homeboys in Outer Space, The Jamie Foxx Show, The Drew Carey Show, The Rerun Show, Son of the Beach, and Robot Chicken. Coleman also played roles in television films these are Like Father, Like Santa (1998), A Carol Christmas (2003), and A Christmas Too Many (2006).

In films, Coleman played himself in S.F.W. (1994), Dirty Work (1998), Shafted! (2000), The Flunky (2000), Frank McKlusky, C.I. (2002), Dickie Roberts: Former Child Star (2003), The Great Buck Howard (2008), and Midgets vs. Mascots (2009). Films where he played a different character were Fox Hunt (1997), Church Ball (2006), and An American Carol (2008).

From 1996 to 1997, Coleman had a recurring role as the voice of Kevin in the animated show Waynehead. In 1997, Coleman voiced Kenny Falmouth in the video game The Curse of Monkey Island, which gained him attention, being one of the first few major mainstream actors to appear in a video game. The adventure game was critically acclaimed, considered one of the best of its genre and has a strong legacy due to its feel, graphics, and voice acting. Jeff Green of Computer Gaming World gave it a rave review and that Coleman "played wonderfully" a "shifty character."

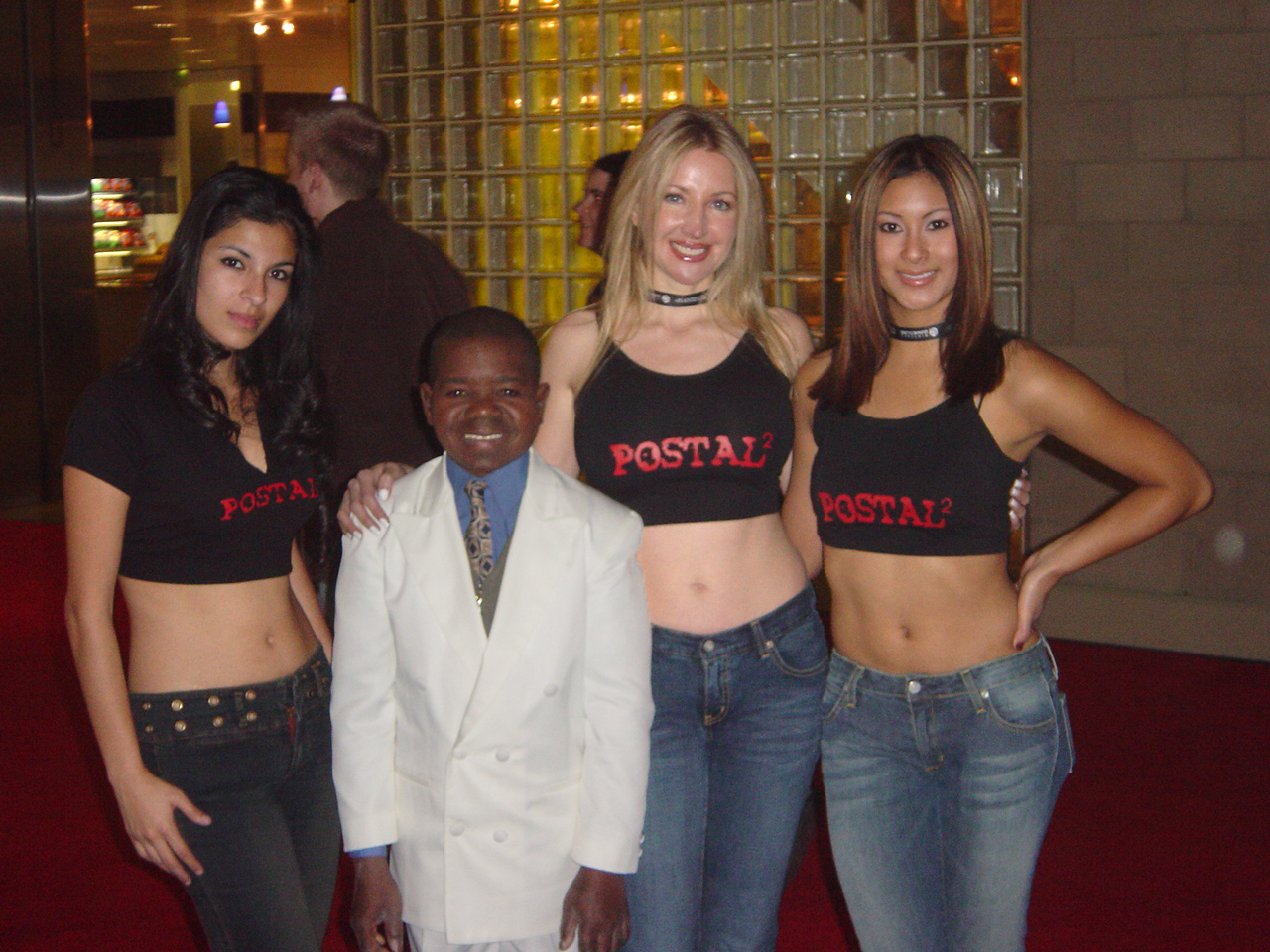
Coleman promoting Postal 2 at E3 2003

Coleman ventured into politics, and in the 2003 California recall election he was an independent candidate for governor. His campaign was sponsored by the free newsweekly East Bay Express as a satirical comment on the recall. After Arnold Schwarzenegger declared his candidacy, Coleman announced that he would vote for Schwarzenegger. Coleman placed 8th in a field of 135 candidates, receiving 14,242 votes.

In 2003, Coleman portrayed a fictional version of himself in the video game Postal 2, the second game in the Postal franchise. Upon its release, the game received "mixed or average reviews" according to review aggregator website Metacritic. Over time, it gained a cult following.

In 2005, Coleman appeared in John Cena's music video for his single "Bad, Bad Man" (from the album You Can't See Me) and played himself as a villain taking Michael Jackson and Madonna hostage. The video was a spoof of 1980s culture, focusing on The A-Team.

Coleman's final television role was a voice role in the animated series Robot Chicken.

== Personal life ==
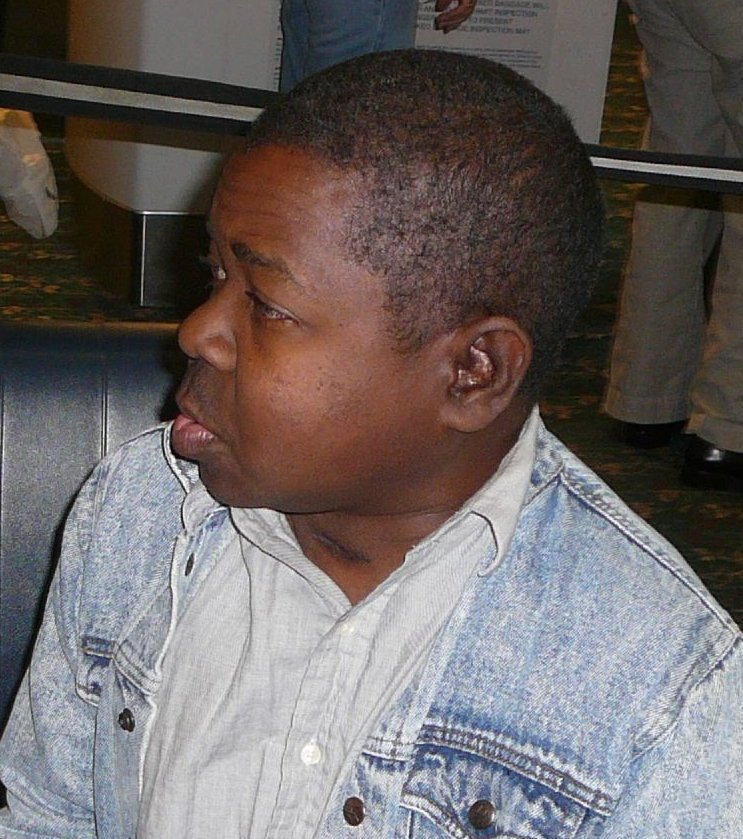
Coleman in 2007

Coleman was an avid railroad fan, and he later worked part-time at Denver-area, Tucson-area, and California hobby stores to be around his hobby. Coleman built and maintained miniature railroads in his homes in several states throughout the 1990s. Currently, at least one of Coleman's model railroads is being preserved in Colorado Springs, Colorado. Coleman lived in Santaquin, a small town about 50 miles (80 km) south of Salt Lake City, Utah, from 2005 until his death.

=== Health issues ===
Coleman, who battled chronic kidney disease, underwent two unsuccessful kidney transplants in 1973 and 1984 and required frequent dialysis even when working long hours on set. In a 1993 television interview, Coleman said he had twice attempted suicide by overdosing on pills. In 2009, Coleman underwent heart surgery. Although the details of the procedure were never made public, he is known to have developed postoperative pneumonia. In January 2010, Coleman was hospitalized after a seizure in Los Angeles, and in February, he experienced another seizure on the set of The Insider television program.

=== Relationship ===
In early 2007, Coleman met Shannon Price, 22, on the set of the film Church Ball, where she was working as an extra. Price and Coleman married several months later. On May 1 and 2, 2008, they made a well-publicized appearance on the show Divorce Court to air their differences in an attempt to save their marriage. However, they divorced in August 2008, and Coleman was granted an ex parte restraining order against Price to prevent her from living in his home when he was hospitalized after their divorce. According to a court petition later filed by Price, she and Coleman continued to live together in a common-law marriage until his death. However, a judge ultimately ruled against Price after hearing testimony that she engaged in love affairs with other men during the time when she claimed to have been with Coleman, and "physically abused Coleman in public, led him around by the hand like a child [and] displayed no physical affection toward him in front of anyone."

=== Legal issues ===
In 1998, Coleman was charged with assault against Tracy Fields, a Los Angeles bus driver and fan of Coleman's work on Diff'rent Strokes who had approached him in a California mall and requested his autograph while he was shopping for a bulletproof vest. When Coleman gave her an autograph but refused to personalize it, an argument ensued, and Fields reportedly mocked Coleman's acting career and in response Coleman who was extremely upset ripped up the autographed photo and threw it in the trash. Coleman then feeling defensive punched Fields in the face in front of witnesses and tried to flee the scene but was stoppped by police officers. He was arrested and later defended himself in court, alleging that he felt threatened by Fields. He said: "She wouldn't leave me alone. I was getting scared, and she was getting ugly." Coleman pleaded no contest to one count of assault after the charge was lowered from battery, received a 90 day suspended sentence, a $400 fine and was ordered to pay Fields' $1,665 hospital bill and to take court mandated anger management classes.

In 2007, Coleman was cited for misdemeanor disorderly conduct in Provo, Utah, after a "heated discussion" in public with his wife, Shannon Price. In 2008, Coleman who resided in Santaquin, Utah after relocating there from Los Angeles a few years prior was involved in an altercation at the South County Lanes bowling alley in Payson, Utah, which began when Colt Rushton, a 24-year-old man, photographed Coleman without his consent. The two men broke into an explosive argument, according to witnesses. In the parking lot, Coleman allegedly backed his truck into Rushton, striking his knee and pulling him under the vehicle, before hitting another car. Rushton was treated at a local hospital for minor injuries and released. Coleman later pleaded no contest to charges of disorderly conduct and reckless driving and was fined $100.

In 2009, Coleman and his then-ex-wife were involved in a domestic dispute, after which Price was arrested on suspicion of domestic violence, and both parties were cited for disorderly conduct. In 2010, he settled a civil suit related to the incident for an undisclosed amount. Months before his death in 2010, Coleman was arrested on an outstanding domestic assault warrant in Santaquin, booked into the Utah County Jail, and released the following day.

=== Financial problems ===
In August 1999, Coleman filed for bankruptcy protection. He claimed that multiple people were responsible for his insolvency, "from me, to accountants, to my adoptive parents, to agents, to lawyers, and back to me again." In 1995, Coleman lost $200,000 ($419,683.73 in 2025) on a failed arcade business he established called the Gary Coleman Game Parlor, which was located at Fisherman's Village in Marina del Rey, California. Ongoing medical expenses contributed significantly to Coleman's chronic financial problems and sometimes compelled him to resort to eccentric fundraising activities. In 1999 after filing for bankruptcy, he partnered with UGO Networks for an online auction titled "Save Me!". Items included his couch, a "tiny pimp suit" with matching gold Nikes and an autographed ice scraper. Items attracted more than $5,000 in bids.

== Death ==
On May 26, 2010, Coleman was admitted to Utah Valley Regional Medical Center in Provo, Utah, in critical condition after falling at his Santaquin home and hitting his head, possibly after another seizure, and experiencing an epidural hematoma. According to a hospital spokesman, Coleman was conscious and lucid the next morning, but his condition subsequently worsened. By mid-afternoon on May 27, he was unconscious and on life support. He died at 12:05 pm MDT on May 28, 2010, at age 42.

The weekend after Coleman's death, a scheduled funeral was postponed and later canceled following a dispute regarding the disposition of his estate and remains among Coleman's adoptive parents, former business associate Anna Gray and Price. Coleman's former manager Dion Mial was initially involved but withdrew after Coleman's 1999 will, which had named Mial as executor, was found to have been superseded by a 2005 will replacing Mial with Gray. The earlier will had stipulated that Coleman's wake be "...conducted by those with no financial ties to me and can look each other in the eyes and say they really cared personally for Gary Coleman", but the later version directed "...that there be no funeral service, wake, or other ceremony memorializing my passing."

=== Aftermath ===
Questions were raised as to whether Price, who approved discontinuing Coleman's life support, was legally authorized to do so. The controversy was exacerbated by a photograph published on the front page of the tabloid newspaper Globe depicting Price posed next to a comatose, intubated Coleman under the headline, "It Was Murder!" While Coleman's final will named Gray as executor and awarded his entire estate to her, Coleman and Price married in 2007. Although she had divorced Coleman in 2008, Price claimed in a court petition that she had remained his common-law wife, with the two sharing bank accounts and presenting themselves publicly as husband and wife until Coleman's death. Her assertion, if validated by the court, would have made her his lawful heir.

In May 2012, Judge James Taylor stated that while Price had indeed lived in Coleman's home after their marriage ended, their relationship at the time of his death failed to meet Utah's standard for a common-law marriage. The hospital later issued a statement confirming that Coleman had completed an advance healthcare directive granting Price permission to make medical decisions on his behalf. An investigation by Santaquin police was closed on October 5, 2010, after the medical examiner ruled Coleman's death accidental and no evidence of wrongdoing could be demonstrated. The disposition of Coleman's ashes remains unknown. Price said that had she been granted disposition, she would have scattered the ashes at the Golden Spike National Historic Site in Utah as a tribute to Coleman's lifelong love of trains.

== Legacy ==
Coleman is frequently listed as one of the most influential child actors in the world. He was rated first on a list of VH1's "100 Greatest Kid Stars" on television, and was noted by MTV for having an "Undeniable Impact on Pop Culture." Mike Hogan from Vanity Fair wrote on his career, saying "He was unquestionably a superstar, overshadowing them with his radiant charisma and boundless energy, but the kidney condition that enabled him, even as a teen, to play the world's most precocious little brother on TV also complicated his life in ways most of us will never understand." Actress Lucille Ball stated in a 1980 interview with People magazine that although she rarely watched sitcoms, "I love Gary Coleman. He puts me away. He puts everybody away."

Filk music act Ookla the Mok paid tribute to Coleman on their 2003 album "oh okay LA" with the song "A.M. Suicide". He is parodied in Avenue Q, which won the 2004 Tony Award for Best Musical; a fictionalized version of him works as the superintendent of the apartment complex where the musical takes place. In the song "It Sucks to Be Me", he laments his fate. On Broadway, the role was originally performed by Natalie Venetia Belcon. The show's creators, Jeff Marx and Robert Lopez, have said the Coleman character personifies one of Avenue Q's central themes: that as children we are told we are "special", but upon entering adulthood, we discover that life is not nearly as easy as we have been led to believe. They added that their original intent was for Coleman himself to play the Gary Coleman role, and he expressed interest in it but did not show up for a meeting scheduled to discuss it. In 2005, Coleman announced his intention to sue the producers of Avenue Q for their depiction of him, although the lawsuit never materialized. At the 2007 New York Comic Con, Coleman said, "I wish there was a lawyer on Earth that would sue them for me."

Following his death in 2010, the casts of the off-Broadway production of Avenue Q in New York City and the Avenue Q National Tour in Dallas dedicated their performances to his memory, and the actors playing the part of Coleman paid tribute to him from the stage at the performances' conclusions. The Coleman character remained in the show after modifications were made to relevant dialogue. Randy Kester—Coleman's attorney—told Dallas News in 2010, "The world's going to be a little less happy place without Gary. For being a small guy, he sure had a big impact on the world." Coleman appeared in 2011 in the intro to the game Postal III and in 2015 in the expansion pack for Postal 2 - Paradise Lost.

In the 2021 Diff'rent Strokes episode of Live in Front of a Studio Audience, actor Kevin Hart played Coleman's signature character of Arnold Jackson. A documentary about Coleman's life, Gary, was released on the streaming service Peacock on August 29, 2024.

== Works and awards ==
Throughout his career, Coleman had garnered over sixty acting credits and over eighty television appearances. For playing the role of Arnold Jackson in the sitcom Diff'rent Strokes (1978–1986), he received several accolades, which include two Young Artist Awards and three People's Choice Awards—the latter being a consecutive three wins for Favorite Young TV Performer from 1980 to 1983—and nominations for two TV Land Awards.

| Year | Award | Category | Work | Result | Ref. |
|---|---|---|---|---|---|
| 1979 | Young Artist Awards | Best Young Actor in a Television Series | Diff'rent Strokes | Nominated | |
| 1980 | Young Artist Awards | Outstanding Contribution to Youth Through Entertainment | Himself | Won | |
| 1980 | People's Choice Awards | Favorite Young TV Performer | Diff'rent Strokes | Won | |
| 1981 | People's Choice Awards | Favorite Young TV Performer | Diff'rent Strokes | Won | |
| 1981 | Young Artist Awards | Best Young Comedian – Motion Picture or Television | Diff'rent Strokes | Nominated | |
| 1982 | Golden Raspberry Awards | Worst Actor | On The Right Track | Nominated | |
| 1982 | Golden Raspberry Awards | Worst New Actor | On The Right Track | Nominated | |
| 1982 | Young Artist Awards | Best Young Actor in a Comedy Series | Diff'rent Strokes | Won | |
| 1982 | People's Choice Awards | Favorite Young TV Performer | Diff'rent Strokes | Won | |
| 1983 | Young Artist Awards | Best Young Actor in a Comedy Series | Diff'rent Strokes | Nominated | |
| 2003 | TV Land Awards | Quintessential Non-Traditional Family (shared with cast) | Diff'rent Strokes | Nominated | |
| 2004 | TV Land Awards | Quintessential Non-Traditional Family (shared with cast) | Diff'rent Strokes | Nominated | |
