= The Gary Coleman Show =

American animated television series

- Genre: Comedy
- Based on: The Kid with the Broken Halo by George Kirgo
- Directed by: George Gordon; Bob Hathcock; Carl Urbano; Rudy Zamora
- Starring: Gary Coleman
- Voices of: Lauren Anders; Jennifer Darling; Julie McWhirter Dees; LaShana Dendy; Geoffrey Gordon; Jerry Houser; Calvin Mason; Sidney Miller; Steve Schatzberg
- Composer: Hoyt Curtin
- Country of origin: United States
- No. of episodes: 13 (26 segments)

Production
- Executive producers: William Hanna; Joseph Barbera
- Producer: Art Scott
- Editor: Gil Iverson
- Running time: 30 minutes
- Production company: Hanna-Barbera Productions

Original release
- Network: NBC
- Release: September 18 – December 11, 1982

The Gary Coleman Show is a 30-minute American Saturday morning animated series produced by Hanna-Barbera Productions that originally aired on NBC during the 1982–1983 season. The series featured Gary Coleman as the voice of Andy LeBeau, an apprentice angel, who was dispatched back to Earth to earn his wings by helping others.

The show featured the voices of Gary Coleman, Lauren Anders, Jennifer Darling, Julie McWhirter Dees, Geoffrey Gordon, LaShana Dendy, Jerry Houser, Calvin Mason, Sidney Miller and Steve Schatzberg.

== Synopsis ==
The character of Andy LeBeau was a spin-off character from Coleman's television film The Kid with the Broken Halo (1982).

In each episode, Andy was dispatched to help a child in need and resolve his problem by his supervisor and fellow angel, Angelica. The antagonist in each episode was Hornswoggle, a demon that only Andy could see, who tried to make Andy's mission more difficult, usually by getting him to make the wrong choice or by otherwise complicating the mission. It was up to Andy to correct whatever mistakes he made and foil Hornswoggle's plans.

== Cast ==
- Gary Coleman – Andy LeBeau
- Lauren Anders – Chris
- Jennifer Darling – Angelica
- Julie McWhirter Dees – Lydia
- Geoffrey Gordon – Haggle
- LaShana Dendy – Tina
- Jerry Houser – Bartholomew
- Calvin Mason – Spence
- Sidney Miller – Hornswoggle
- Steve Schatzberg – Mack

=== Additional voices ===
- Rick Dees
- Patrick Fraley
- Billie Hayes
- Casey Kasem – Announcer (uncredited)
- Danny Mann
- Zelda Rubinstein
- Eric Suter
- Janet Waldo
- Frank Welker

== Episodes ==
No.	Title	Written by	Original release date
1	"Fouled Up Fossils"	Cliff Roberts	September 18, 1982
1	"Going, Going, Gone"	Cliff Roberts	September 18, 1982
2	"You Oughtta' Be In Pictures"	Dianne Dixon	September 25, 1982
2	"Derby Daze"	Martin Werner	September 25, 1982
3	"Hornswoggle's Hoax"	Robert Jayson & Paul Dini	October 2, 1982
3	"Calamity Canine"	Peter L. Dixon	October 2, 1982
4	"Cupid Andy"	John Bates	October 9, 1982
4	"Space Odd-Essey"	Janis Diamond	October 9, 1982
5	"Hornswoggle's New Leaf"	Paul Dini	October 16, 1982
5	"Keep On Movin' On"	Mark Shiney	October 16, 1982
6	"Mansion Madness"	Dianne Dixon	October 23, 1982
6	"Wuthering Kites"	David Villaire	October 23, 1982
7	"In the Swim"	Bob Langhans	October 30, 1982
7	"Put Up or Fix Up"	David Villaire	October 30, 1982
8	"Haggle and Double Haggle"	Larry Parr	November 6, 1982
8	"The Royal Visitor"	Sandy Fries	November 6, 1982
9	"The Future Tense"	Janis Diamond & Allan Heldfond	November 13, 1982
9	"Dr. Livingston, I Presume"	Dianne Dixon	November 13, 1982
10	"Haggle's Luck"	John T. Graham	November 20, 1982
10	"Head in the Clouds"	Tom Ruegger	November 20, 1982
11	"Teacher's Pest"	John T. Graham	November 27, 1982
11	"Andy Sings the Blues"	Janis Diamond & Allan Heldfond	November 27, 1982
12	"Easy Money"	Bob Langhans	December 4, 1982
12	"Take My Tonsils -Please-"	Tom Ruegger	December 4, 1982
13	"The Prettiest Girl in Oakville"	Mark Shiney	December 11, 1982
13	"Mack's Snow Job"	Sandy Fries	December 11, 1982

== Later years ==
The Gary Coleman Show aired on Cartoon Network and Boomerang (the block and network) in the mid-90s and into 2006, when it was aired on Adult Swim before leaving Turner's schedules before 2010; the series has not seen any release since then.
