= Robert Guillaume =

American actor (1927–2017)

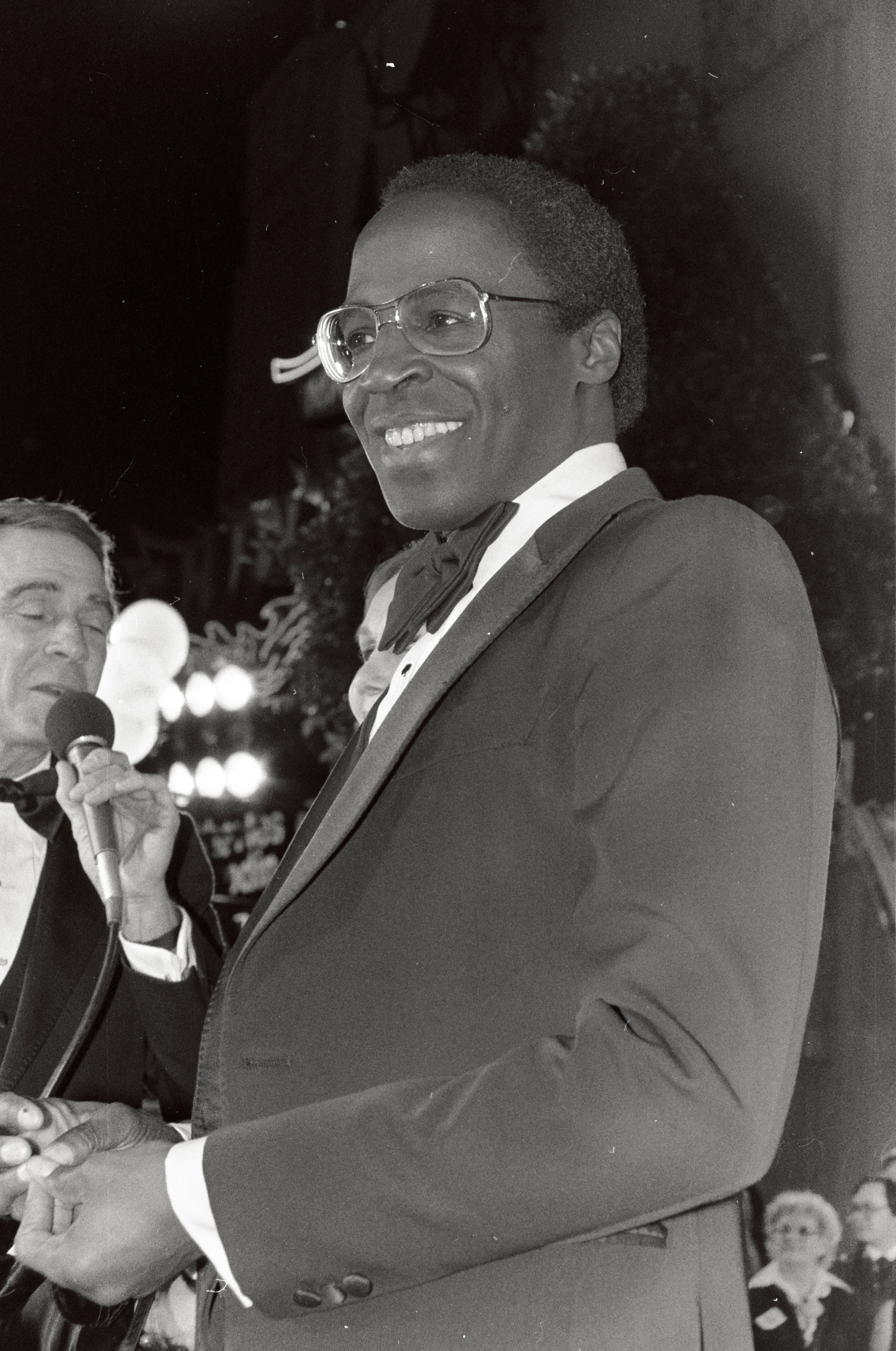
- Guillaume at the premiere of Seems Like Old Times in 1980
- Born: Robert Peter Williams; November 30, 1927; St. Louis, Missouri, U.S.
- Died: October 24, 2017 (aged 89); Los Angeles, California, U.S.
- Resting place: Inglewood Park Cemetery
- Education: Washington University in St. Louis
- Occupations: Actor; singer
- Years active: 1959–2017
- Known for: Soap; Benson; Guys and Dolls; The Lion King
- Spouses: Marlene Williams (m. 1955; div. 1984); Donna Brown-Guillaume (m. 1986)
- Children: 5

Robert Guillaume (born Robert Peter Williams; November 30, 1927 – October 24, 2017) was an American actor and singer. He played Benson DuBois in the ABC television series Soap and its spin-off, Benson. He also voiced the mandrill Rafiki in The Lion King, and played Isaac Jaffe in Aaron Sorkin's dramedy Sports Night.

In a career that spanned more than 50 years, Guillaume worked extensively on stage, television and film. He was nominated for a Tony Award for his portrayal of Nathan Detroit in Guys and Dolls, and twice won an Emmy Award for his portrayal of the character Benson DuBois, once in 1979 on Soap and again in 1985 on Benson. He also won a Grammy Award in 1995 for his spoken-word performance of an audiobook version of The Lion King. Guillaume was the first African-American actor to portray the title role in Andrew Lloyd Webber’s The Phantom of the Opera.

== Early life and education ==
Guillaume was born Robert Peter Williams in St. Louis to an alcoholic mother. After she abandoned him and several siblings, they were raised by their grandmother, Jeannette Williams.

He studied at Saint Louis University and Washington University in St. Louis and served in the U.S. Army before pursuing an acting career. He adopted the surname Guillaume (French for William) as his stage name.

== Career ==
=== Stage ===
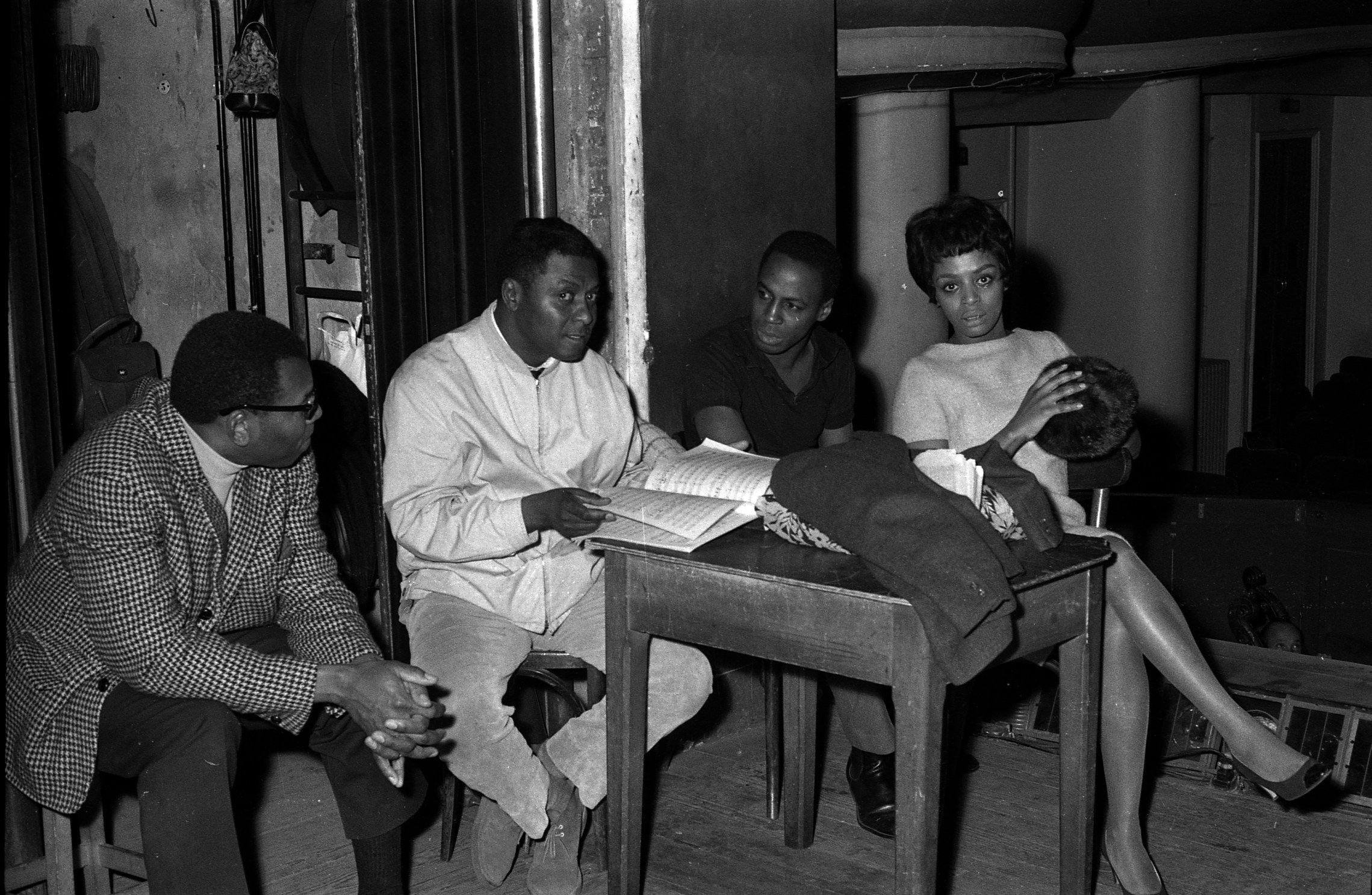
George Goodman, William Ray, Robert Guillaume, and Olive Moorefield, rehearsal of Porgy and Bess, Théâtre du Capitole, Toulouse, France

After college, Guillaume joined the Karamu Players in Cleveland and performed in musical comedies and opera. He toured the world in 1959 as a cast member of the Broadway musical Free and Easy. He made his Broadway debut in Kwamina in 1961. His other stage appearances included Golden Boy (with Sammy Davis Jr.), Tambourines to Glory, Guys and Dolls, for which he received a Tony Award nomination, Jacques Brel is Alive and Well and Living in Paris, and Purlie. His additional roles included Katherine Dunham's Bambouche and in Fly The Blackbird.

In 1964, Guillaume portrayed Sportin' Life in a revival of Porgy and Bess at New York City Center. Guillaume was a member of the Robert De Cormier Singers, performing in concerts and on television. He recorded an LP album, Columbia CS9033, titled Just Arrived, as a member of The Pilgrims, a folk trio, with Angeline Butler and Millard Williams. Columbia records producer Tom Wilson had set out to create the Pilgrims as an answer to the popular folk trio Peter, Paul and Mary. By early 1964, the Pilgrims had recorded a handful of songs and Wilson was looking for the right song for the group's debut single when a then-unknown singer/songwriter named Paul Simon arrived for a meeting with Wilson and eventually pitched his new composition, "The Sound of Silence". Wilson liked the song and had Simon record a demo for the group, but when Simon and his friend, Art Garfunkel, sang the song for Wilson in person, he signed them to a record contract instead of using it for The Pilgrims.

In 1976, Guillaume played Nathan Detroit in the Broadway revival of Guys and Dolls and was nominated for a Tony Award.

In 1990, Guillaume was cast in the Los Angeles production of The Phantom of the Opera, replacing Michael Crawford in the title role. Guillaume was the first Black actor to portray the character.

=== Television ===
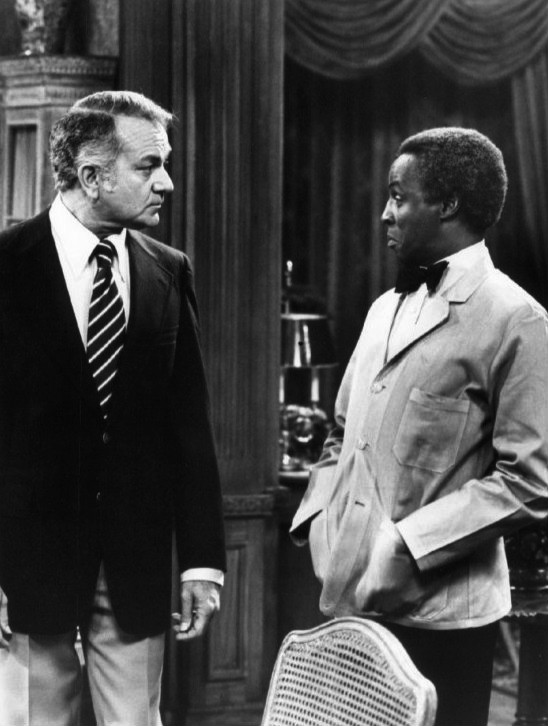
As Benson in Soap, 1977

Guillaume made several guest appearances on sitcoms, including Good Times, The Jeffersons, Sanford and Son, Saved by the Bell: The College Years and in the 1990s sitcoms The Fresh Prince of Bel-Air and A Different World. Guillaume also played Dr. Franklin in season 6, episode 6 ("Chain Letter") of the series All in the Family, in which he coyly referenced Marcus Welby, M.D., a TV series in which he had guest-starred in 1970.

His series-regular debut was on the ABC series Soap, playing Benson, a butler, from 1977 to 1979. Guillaume continued the role in a spin-off series, Benson, which ran for 158 episodes from 1979 until 1986.

In 1985, Guillaume appeared in the television mini-series North and South as abolitionist leader Frederick Douglass, who escaped from slavery and became a leader of the anti-slavery movement prior to the American Civil War.

He also appeared as marriage counselor Edward Sawyer on The Robert Guillaume Show (1989), Detective Bob Ballard on Pacific Station (1991–1992), and television executive Isaac Jaffe Sports Night (1998–2000). Guillaume suffered a mild stroke on January 14, 1999, while filming an episode of the latter series. He recovered and his character was later also depicted as having had a stroke. He also made a guest appearance on 8 Simple Rules for Dating My Teenage Daughter. He made one of his final TV appearances during season 5 on Oprah: Where Are They Now?

He voiced characters in the television series Captain Planet and the Planeteers, Fish Police, and Happily Ever After: Fairy Tales for Every Child. He was known for the voice of Rafiki in the movie The Lion King and its sequels and spin-offs. He lent his deep tenor voice as Mr. Thicknose in The Land Before Time VIII: The Big Freeze. He also supplied the voice for Eli Vance in the 2004 video game Half-Life 2 and its episodic sequels.

== Other activities ==
Guillaume and his wife Donna were co-founders of Artists for a Free South Africa (later renamed Artists for a New South Africa) in 1989, along with a number of other Hollywood actors, including Alfre Woodard.

== Personal life ==
Guillaume was married twice; first to Marlene Williams in 1955, with whom he had two sons. Guillaume's daughter was born in 1980. They divorced in 1984. He married Donna Brown in 1986. The couple had a daughter. He also fathered a daughter by a different mother, who was born in 1950.

In 1999, Guillaume suffered a stroke while working on Sports Night at Walt Disney Studios in Burbank, California. The stroke was minor, causing relatively slight damage and little effect on his speech. After six weeks in the hospital, he underwent therapy consisting of walks and gym sessions. Guillaume was Catholic.

== Death ==
Guillaume died of prostate cancer on October 24, 2017, at his home in Los Angeles, California, aged 89.

== Acting credits ==
=== Film ===
Year	Title	Role	Notes
1973	Super Fly T.N.T.	Jordan Gaines	
1980	Seems Like Old Times	Fred	
1984	Prince Jack	Martin Luther King, Jr.	
1986	Wanted: Dead or Alive	Philmore Walker	
1987	They Still Call Me Bruce	V.A. Officer	
1989	Lean on Me	Dr. Frank Napier	
1990	Death Warrant	Hawkins	
1993	The Meteor Man	Ted Reed — Jeff's Father	
1994	The Lion King	Rafiki (voice)	
1996	Spy Hard	Agent Steve Bishop	
1996	First Kid	Wilkes	
1998	The Easter Story Keepers	Ben (voice)	Direct-to-video
1998	The Lion King II: Simba's Pride	Rafiki (voice)	Direct-to-video
1999	Silicon Towers	Detective Green	
2001	The Land Before Time VIII: The Big Freeze	Mr. Thicknose (voice)	Direct-to-video
2002	The Adventures of Tom Thumb & Thumbelina	Ben (voice)	Direct-to-video
2002	13th Child	Riley	
2003	The Lion King Read-Along	Rafiki (voice)	Direct-to-video
2003	Big Fish	Dr. Bennett (senior)	
2004	The Lion King 1½	Rafiki (voice)	Direct-to-video
2008	The Secrets of Jonathan Sperry	Mr. Barnes	
2011	Satin	Doc Bishop	
2012	Columbus Circle	Howard Miles	
2013	Off the Beach	Dr. Black	Short film

=== Television ===
Year	Title	Role	Notes
1966	Porgy in Wien	Unknown role	TV movie
1969	Julia	Robert Barron	Episode: "The Wheel Deal"
1970	Marcus Welby, M.D.	Aaron Carothers	Episode: "The Soft Phrase of Peace"
1975	Sanford and Son	Albert Brock	Episode: "Steinberg and Son"
1975	All in the Family	Dr. Franklin	Episode: "Chain Letter"
1975	The Jeffersons	Charles Thompson	Episode: "George Won't Talk"
1977	Good Times	Fishbone - Theodopius P. Johnson	Episode: "Requiem for a Wino"
1977–1980	Soap	Benson DuBois	Recurring role (50 episodes)
1978	Dean Martin Celebrity Roast: Jack Klugman	Himself	TV special
1978	Hollywood Squares	Himself (Panelist)	Episode: "12.18.1978"
1978–1979	The Mike Douglas Show	Himself (Guest / Co-Host)	9 episodes
1979	The Kid from Left Field	Larry Cooper	TV movie
1979	Dinah!	Himself (Guest)	Episode: "05.01.1979"
1979	2nd Annual Black Achievement Awards	Himself (Host)	TV special
1979–1983	All-Star Family Feud Special	Himself (Celebrity Contestant)	3 episodes
1979–1986	Benson	Benson DuBois	Series regular (159 episodes)
1979–1991	The Tonight Show with Johnny Carson	Himself (Guest)	9 episodes
1980	The Donna Summer Special	An Angel	TV special
1980–1981	The Love Boat	Frank Belloque / Allan Curtis	3 episodes
1981	Purlie	Purlie Victorious Judson	TV movie
1981	An Evening at the Improv	Himself (Host)	TV special
1982	The Kid with the Broken Halo	Blake	TV movie
1983	The Kid with the 200 I.Q.	Professor Mills	TV movie
1983	Saturday Night Live	Himself (Host)	Episode: "Robert Guillaume / Duran Duran"
1985	North & South: Book I	Frederick Douglas	Miniseries (6 episodes)
1986	John Grin's Christmas	John Grin	TV movie (also director); co-starred Guillaume's real-life son Kevin
1986	Hotel	Frank Stoner	Episode: "Shadow Play"
1987	Perry Mason: The Case of the Scandalous Scoundrel	Harlan Wade	TV movie
1987	Crossbow	Nolan Ben Sunniman Al Hedrem	2 episodes
1987	The New Hollywood Squares	Himself (Panelist)	Episode: "10.26.1987"
1989	The Penthouse	Eugene St. Clair	TV movie
1989	The Robert Guillaume Show	Edward Sawyer	Series regular (12 episodes)
1989	Fire and Rain	Carter	TV movie
1989	Sister Kate	Mr. Townsend	Episode: "Neville's Hired Hand"
1990	Carol & Company	Sam	Episode: "Soap Gets in Your Eyes"
1990	The Arsenio Hall Show	Himself	Episode: "06.11.1990"
1991–1992	A Different World	Dean Winston / Professor Murphy	3 episodes
1991–1992	Pacific Station	Detective Bob Ballard	Series regular (13 episodes)
1992	Murder Without Motive: The Edmund Perry Story	Police Commissioner	TV movie (uncredited)
1992	L.A. Law	Edward Rollins	Episode: "Diet, Diet My Darling"
1992	Fish Police	Detective Catfish (voice)	6 episodes
1992	Jack's Place	Ted Sill	Episode: "Romance Takes a Curtain Call"
1992	Driving Miss Daisy	Hoke Colburn	TV movie
1992	Mastergate	Sydley Sellers	TV movie
1992	You Must Remember This	Uncle Buddy	TV movie
1992	One on One with John Tesh	Himself (Guest)	Episode: "#1.86"
1992	Jeopardy!	Himself (Contestant)	Episode: "Celebrity Jeopardy! Game #5"
1993	The Addams Family	Mr. Corblarb (voice)	Episode: "Color Me Addams"
1993	Diagnosis Murder	Father Morrissey	Episode: "Miracle Cure"
1993	Saved by the Bell: The College Years	Dr. Arthur Hemmings	Episode: "A Question of Ethics"
1994	Burke's Law	Eugene Sayers	Episode: "Who Killed the Fashion King?"
1994	Captain Planet and the Planeteers	Citizen (voice)	Episode: "Bug Off"
1994	The Fresh Prince of Bel-Air	Pete Fletcher	Episode: "You'd Better Shop Around"
1994	Greyhounds	Robert Smith	TV movie
1994	Cosmic Slop	Gleason Golightly	TV movie (Segment: "Space Traders")
1994	Reading Rainbow	Himself (voice)	Episode: "My Shadow"
1995	Children of the Dust	Mossburger	Miniseries (2 episodes)
1995–1999	Timon & Pumbaa	Rafiki (voice)	Recurring role (12 episodes)
1995–2000	Happily Ever After: Fairy Tales for Every Child	Narrator (voice)	Series regular (39 episodes)
1996	Lamb Chop's Chanukah and Passover Surprise	Robert	TV movie
1996	Run for the Dream: The Gail Devers Story	Reverend Devers	TV movie
1996	Panic in the Skies	Rob Barnes	TV movie
1996	Pandora's Clock	Ambassador Lee Lancaster	Miniseries (2 episodes)
1996	Sparks	Professor Bernard Slater	Episode: "Porky's Revenge"
1996	Promised Land	Martin Woolridge	Episode: "Christmas"
1996	Crystal Cave	Merlin	TV movie
1996	Alchemy	Merlin	TV movie
1997	Goode Behavior	Dr. Baxter	Episode: "Goode Daddy"
1997	Mother Goose: A Rappin' and Rhymin' Special	Narrator (voice)	TV movie
1997	Touched by an Angel	Judge Dawes	Episode: "Jones vs. God"
1997	Merry Christmas, George Bailey	Mr. Gower	TV movie
1997	Metropolitan Hospital	Unknown role	TV movie
1997	Wheel of Fortune	Himself (Celebrity Contestant)	Episode: "Celebrity Week 2"
1998	The Outer Limits	Mr. Brown	Episode: "Monster"
1998	His Bodyguard	Garrett	TV movie
1998–2000	Sports Night	Isaac Jaffe	Series regular (45 episodes)
1999	E! True Hollywood Story	Himself (Interviewee)	Episode: "Superfly: The Ron O'Neal Story"
2000	Moesha	Arthur	Episode: "All This and Turkey, Too"
2001	Hollywood Squares	Himself (Panelist)	2 episodes
2002	The Proud Family	Dr. Parker (voice)	Episode: "Behind Family Lines"
2003	8 Simple Rules	Cody Grant	Episode: "Every Picture Tells a Story"
2004	Century City	Judge	Episode: "To Know Her"
2005	Larry King Live	Himself (Guest)	Episode: "05.20.2005"
2008	CSI: Crime Scene Investigation	Sonny Bridges	Episode: "Young Man with a Horn"
2013	Wanda Sykes Presents Herlarious	Historian	TV special
2016	Oprah: Where Are They Now?	Himself (Interviewee)	Episode: "Transgender Teen Jazz Jennings/Stars of "Growing Pains"/Robert Guillaume"

=== Theater ===
Year	Title	Role	Notes
1960	Finian's Rainbow	2nd Geologist / Howard (understudy)	Broadway
1961	Kwamina	Ako	Broadway
1963	Tambourines to Glory	C.J. Moore	Broadway
1964	Porgy and Bess	Sportin' Life	Off-Broadway
1970–1973	Purlie	Purlie	Broadway & National tour
1976–1977	Guys and Dolls	Nathan Detroit	Broadway
1990	The Phantom of the Opera	The Phantom of the Opera	Los Angeles
1993–1994	Cyrano — The Musical	Cyrano	Broadway

=== Music videos ===
Year	Title	Role	Notes
1980	Dianna Ross: "Bridge Over Troubled Waters"	Angel-Man	
1994	Elton John: "Circle of Life"	Himself	uncredited

=== Video games ===
Year	Title	Role	Notes
1994	Animated StoryBook: The Lion King	Rafiki	Voice role
1995	The Lion King: Activity Center	Rafiki	Voice role
1998	The Lion King II: Simba's Pride Active Play	Rafiki	Voice role
1998	Disney's Adventures in Typing with Timon & Pumbaa	Rafiki	Voice role
2000	The Lion King: Simba's Mighty Adventure	Rafiki	Voice role
2003	Extreme Skate Adventure	Rafiki	Voice role
2004	Who Wants to King of the Jungle	Rafiki	Voice role
2004	Timon & Pumbaa Virtual Safari 1.5	Rafiki	Voice role
2004	Rafiki's Challenge	Rafiki	Voice role
2004	Half-Life 2	Dr. Eli Vance	Voice role
2005	Kingdom Hearts II	Rafiki	Voice role (English version)
2006	Half-Life 2: Episode One	Dr. Eli Vance	Voice role
2007	Kingdom Hearts II: Final Mix+	Rafiki	Voice role (English version)
2007	Half-Life 2: Episode Two	Dr. Eli Vance	Voice role
2012	Sorcerers of the Magic Kingdom	Rafiki	Voice role

== Awards and honors ==
Guillaume has a star on the St. Louis Walk of Fame. On November 28, 1984, he received a star on the Hollywood Walk of Fame for his work in the television industry.

Year	Association	Award category	Result
1977	Guys and Dolls	Tony Award for Best Actor in a Musical	Nominated
1977	Guys and Dolls	Drama Desk Award for Outstanding Actor in a Musical	Nominated
1979	Soap	Primetime Emmy Award for Outstanding Supporting Actor in a Comedy Series	Won
1980	Benson	Primetime Emmy Award for Outstanding Lead Actor in a Comedy Series	Nominated
1982	Benson	Primetime Emmy Award for Outstanding Lead Actor in a Comedy Series	Nominated
1983	Benson	Golden Globe Award for Best Actor – Television Series Musical or Comedy	Nominated
1983	Benson	Primetime Emmy Award for Outstanding Lead Actor in a Comedy Series	Nominated
1984	Benson	Golden Globe Award for Best Actor – Television Series Musical or Comedy	Nominated
1984	Benson	Primetime Emmy Award for Outstanding Lead Actor in a Comedy Series	Nominated
1985	Benson	Golden Globe Award for Best Actor – Television Series Musical or Comedy	Nominated
1985	Benson	Primetime Emmy Award for Outstanding Lead Actor in a Comedy Series	Won
1995	The Lion King Read-Along	Grammy Award for Best Spoken Word Album for Children	Won
2000	Sports Night	Screen Actors Guild Award for Outstanding Performance by an Ensemble in a Comedy Series	Nominated
2000	Happily Ever After: Fairy Tales for Every Child	Daytime Emmy Award for Outstanding Performer in an Animated Program	Nominated
