= Toni Lopopolo =

Toni Lopopolo is a literary agent whose book publishing career began in 1970 in the publicity department of Bantam Books, where she helped publicize authors such as Philip Roth, Barbara Cartland, Isaac Asimov and Louis L'Amour.

She next worked as library promotion director at Harcourt Brace Jovanovich and visited almost every major library in the USA. Then Houghton Mlfflin offered her a position in Boston as marketing manager, paperback books. Her big campaigns included Even Cowgirls Get the Blues by Tom Robbins. When Macmillan made her executive editor, she moved back to New York City and published Judy Mazel’s Beverly Hills Diet and Elvis 56 by Al Wertheimer among other hits.

St. Martin's Press made an offer she could not refuse, so Lopopol became executive editor there from 1981 to 1990 and published Hot Flashes by Barbara Raskin, Rich and Famous by Kate Coscarelli, Elsa Lanchester, Myself by Elsa Lanchester, On the Other Hand: A Life Story by Fay Wray and many more titles.

In 1991, Lopopolo opened Toni Lopopolo Literary Management. She has since sold books for authors including Sol Stein, Lee Silber, Lillian Glass, Steve Duno, Nancy Baer, Flo Fitzgerald, Judith Smith-Levin, Howard Olgin, Jeanette Baker, Larry Seeley, Robin Winter and E. Van Lowe. Lopopolo relocated her company to Santa Barbara, California, in 2011.

Lopopolo is also known for her Fiction Bootcamp workshops, taught with Shelly Lowenkopf, where she uses a unique method that helps first-time novelists to master the skills needed to successfully write book-length fiction, and she aids non-fiction writers to produce compelling narrative non-fiction, using fiction techniques. Lopopolo has held workshops at Temple University in Philadelphia and at the Writer's Room of Bucks County, Pennsylvania, as well for the Ventura County Writers' Club and the Santa Barbara Writers' Conference in California.
