= Shelly Lowenkopf =

American writer and editor (born 1931)

Shelly Lowenkopf (born September 6, 1931, Santa Monica, California) is an American writer and editor. He was an instructor in the Master of Professional Writing Program at the University of Southern California from 1974 until 2008. In 2012, he was appointed visiting professor at the College of Creative Studies, University of California, Santa Barbara.

== Writing and career ==
Lowenkopf has served as editorial director for literary, scholarly, and general tradebook publishers, seeing more than 500 books through the editorial and production process. He ran the Los Angeles office of a major mass-market book publisher and edited literary, mystery, and science-fiction/fantasy magazines before being called to a career as an editorial consultant to authors, book publishers, and literary agents. He has written and lectured extensively at writers’ conferences and schools about his novels and short stories.

His own short fiction has appeared widely in the literary press. As a book reviewer and critic, his essays and commentary have been published in major metropolitan dailies and national publications. He currently contributes a weekly book review column to the Montecito Journal. Other of his writings have appeared in such diverse venues as The Oxford Companion to Archaeology, Amazing Stories magazine, The Eureka Literary Magazine, The Portable Writers’ Conference, and Snoopy on Writing. He is the former regional president of the Mystery Writers of America and has edited a number of bestselling mystery authors.

Beginning in August 2015, he has been the editorial director for the online publication The Cafe Luna Review.

== Bibliography ==
- The Love of the Lion (1962)
- The Fiction Writer's Handbook (2004)
- Love Will Make You Drink and Gamble, Stay Out Late at Night (2014)
- The Reluctant Lawman (2022) (under Craig Barstow pseudonym)
- The Robber Barons (2022) (under Craig Barstow pseudonym)
- Struts and Frets: Matt Bender Stories (2024)
