= The Kid with the 200 I.Q. =

- Genre: Comedy; Family
- Screenplay by: Oliver Hawthorne
- Story by: Oliver Hawthorne; Philip Margo
- Directed by: Leslie H. Martinson
- Starring: Gary Coleman; Robert Guillaume; Kari Michaelsen
- Theme music composer: Dennis McCarthy
- Country of origin: United States
- Original language: English

Production
- Executive producers: Robert Guillaume; Phil Margo
- Producer: Jim Begg
- Production location: Claremont, California
- Cinematography: Gary Graver
- Editor: Joe Morrisey
- Running time: 96 minutes
- Production companies: Guillaume-Margo Productions; Zephyr Productions

Original release
- Network: NBC
- Release: February 6, 1983

The Kid with the 200 I.Q. is a 1983 American made-for-television comedy film starring Gary Coleman and Robert Guillaume. It was broadcast February 6, 1983 on NBC.

== Plot ==
An intelligent teenager attends college, becomes roommates with a popular jock and must adjust to their new adult life.

== Cast ==
- Gary Coleman as Nick Newell
- Robert Guillaume as Professor Mills
- Kari Michaelsen as Julie Gordon
- Mel Stewart as Debs
- Darian Mathias as Dinah
- Charles Bloom as Travis Ault
- Clayton Rohner as Jeff Langford
- Harriet Nelson as Professor Conklin
- Dean Butler as Steve Bensfield
- Harrison Page as Walter Newell
- Starletta DuPois as Minna Newell
- Crispin Glover as New Student
