= Playing with Fire (1985 film) =

1985 American made-for-television film

- Genre: Drama
- Written by: Lew Hunter
- Directed by: Ivan Nagy
- Starring: Gary Coleman; Cicely Tyson; Ron O'Neal; Yaphet Kotto
- Music by: Dennis McCarthy
- Country of origin: United States
- Original language: English

Production
- Executive producers: Lew Hunter; Lee Levinson
- Producer: Jim Begg
- Cinematography: Gary Graver
- Editor: Ed Cotter
- Running time: 100 min.
- Production companies: Zephyr Productions; New World Television

Original release
- Network: NBC
- Release: April 14, 1985

Playing with Fire is a 1985 American made-for-television drama film starring Gary Coleman (in his first and only dramatic role), Cicely Tyson, Ron O'Neal, and Yaphet Kotto. It premiered April 14, 1985, on NBC.

== Plot ==
As his parents break up and his school grades drop, troubled teenager David Phillips turns to arson.

== Cast ==
- Gary Coleman as David Phillips
- Cicely Tyson as Carol Phillips
- Ron O'Neal as Steve Phillips
- Yaphet Kotto as Fire Chief Walker
- Tammy Lauren as Pamela Fredericks
- Tom Fridley as Mike Harris
- Salome Jens as Dr. Becker
- Richard McKenzie as Principal Sweeney
- Arthur Burghardt as Harry
- Jacque Lynn Colton as Miss Somerhalter
- Rance Howard as Fireman Goodwin
- Ron Jackson as Fireman Wilson
- Cherie Johnson as Eileen Phillips
- Wesley Pfenning as Mrs. Williams
- Brad Savage as Paul
- Erica Zeitlin as Judy
- Jimmy Keegan as Jody
- Jonathan "Fudge" Leonard as Hank Phillips
- John Louie as Willie
- Gary Riley as Charlie
- Kim Sedgwick as Sedgwick
