= James Ragan =

American poet and educator

James Joseph Ragan
- Born: December 19, 1944 (age 81); Duquesne, Pennsylvania
- Education: Ohio University
- Occupations: Poet, professor, screenwriter, book reviewer
- Website: jamesragan.com

James Ragan (born December 19, 1944) is an American poet, screenwriter, and educator. He has traveled and worked around the world and was the director of the Professional Writing Program at the University of Southern California for 25 years as well as a book reviewer for the Los Angeles Times. In 1996, BUZZ Magazine named Ragan one of the “100 Coolest People in Los Angeles: Those Who Make a Difference.”

== Early life and education ==
James Joseph Ragan was born on December 19, 1944, in Duquesne, Pennsylvania. He is the son of John and Teresa (Jakuba) Ragan. According to Ragan, he said "he learned English as a second language to his family's native Slavic, but quickly learned the power of words in order to survive." Ragan did well in school and excelled in athletics. He tried out for the New York Yankees but decided to go to college instead of pursuing an athletic career.

Ragan graduated from Saint Vincent College in Latrobe, Pennsylvania with a BA. He then attended and graduated from Ohio University with an MA (1967) and Ph.D. (1971) both in English Literature.

== Teaching career ==
He held Assistant Professorships in Creative Writing at Ohio University (1971–72), the American College in Athens, Greece (1973) and the University of Texas, El Paso (1979). For most of his academic career he worked at the University of Southern California as the director of the Professional Writing Program for 25 years.

For 25 years, since 1993, Ragan served as distinguished visiting poet-in-residence at Charles University in Prague. Ragan also completed Distinguished Visiting Professorships at Caltech (1989–1992), University of Oklahoma (2007), and Bowling Green State University (2010). He was also awarded two Fulbright Professorships to teach at Lublyana University in Slovenia in 1984 and at Beijing University in China in 1988.

He has honorary Ph.D.s from Saint Vincent College (1990) and London's Richmond University (2001).

== Writing and poetry ==
Ragan's numerous books of poetry include In the Talking Hours, Lusions, The Hunger Wall, Womb-Weary: Poems, Too Long a Solitude, and The Chanter's Reed. Ragan's poems have been celebrated by many including Seamus Heaney "for sparing no passion in believing they sing."

Ragan has read his poetry around the world, for heads of state, including Mikhail Gorbachev and Czech President Václav Havel. In 1985 he was invited to perform at the First International Poetry Festival in Moscow along with other Americans Robert Bly and Bob Dylan.

He worked with many poets over the years on events, lectures, and workshops. For instance, in 2005 he performed with Anne Waldman at the Getty Center on the theme of duration in poetry to complement the Getty Research Institute's 2004–2005 theme of "Duration."

Ragan has also written and consulted on many plays and screenplays for the stage and film. He has worked with many film producers including Albert S. Ruddy Productions (The Godfather) at Paramount Pictures, Arista Films, Kitty Films, Kairos Balkan Films, Fog and Desire Films in Prague, and Maccana Teoranta Films in Ireland.

Original plays by Ragan include Saints and Commedia. Original screenplays by Ragan include Faber, The Man based on the life of Howard Hughes and written for Clint Eastwood, and Lady Oscar.

== Awards ==
- Emerson Poetry Prize (1971) In 1984
- Fulbright Senior Lectureship in poetry to the University of Ljubljana, Yugoslavia (1984)
- Honorary membership in the Russian Academy of Arts and Sciences (1997)
- Albert Nelson Marquis Lifetime Achievement Award (2020)
