= The Kid with the Broken Halo =

- Genre: Comedy; Family; Fantasy
- Written by: George Kirgo
- Directed by: Leslie H. Martinson
- Starring: Gary Coleman; Robert Guillaume; Mason Adams; Ray Walston
- Theme music composer: Tommy Vig
- Country of origin: United States
- Original language: English

Production
- Executive producers: Lawrence Kuppin; Harry Sloan
- Producer: Jim Begg
- Cinematography: Gary Graver
- Editor: Ed Cotter
- Running time: 100 minutes
- Production companies: Satellite Productions; Zephyr Productions

Original release
- Network: NBC
- Release: April 5, 1982

The Kid with the Broken Halo is a 1982 American made-for-television fantasy-comedy film starring Gary Coleman, Robert Guillaume, June Allyson, Mason Adams and Ray Walston about a wise-cracking "angel-in-training" (Coleman) who needs constant help from his frustrated heavenly teacher. It was directed by Leslie H. Martinson, written by George Kirgo and was originally broadcast April 5, 1982 on NBC.

== Cast ==
- Gary Coleman ... Andy LeBeau
- Robert Guillaume ... Blake
- June Allyson ... Dorothea Powell
- Mason Adams... Harry Tannenbaum
- Ray Walston ... Michael
- John Pleshette ... Jeff McNulty
- Lani O'Grady ... Julie NcNulty
- Telma Hopkins ... Gail Desautel
- Kim Fields ... Teri Desautel
- Tammy Lauren ... Dinah McNulty
- Keith Coogan ... Nick McNulty
- Georg Stanford Brown ... Rudy Desautel
- Corey Feldman ... Rafe
- Don Diamond ... Giuseppe

== Animated series ==
The film's lead character, Andy LeBeau, was spun off into a Hanna-Barbera-produced animated series called The Gary Coleman Show which aired on NBC during the 1982–83 season. Coleman provided the voice of Andy, an apprentice angel dispatched back to Earth to earn his wings by helping others and who also dealt with an antagonist named Hornswoggle, a well-dressed demon with purple clothes, black hair and a goatee.

== See also ==
- List of films about angels
