= The Kid from Left Field (1979 film) =

- Cover of VHS release of movie
- Genre: Comedy; Family; Sport
- Written by: Katharyn Powers; Jack Sher
- Directed by: Adell Aldrich
- Starring: Gary Coleman; Robert Guillaume; Gary Collins; Ed McMahon
- Music by: David Michael Frank
- Country of origin: United States
- Original language: English

Production
- Executive producer: Deena Silver-Kramer
- Producer: David Vreeland
- Cinematography: Frank Thackery
- Editors: Robert Hernandez; Peter Kirby
- Running time: 100 minutes
- Production companies: Gary Coleman Productions; Zephyr Productions

Original release
- Network: NBC
- Release: September 30, 1979

The Kid from Left Field is a 1979 American made-for-television baseball comedy film starring Gary Coleman and Robert Guillaume. Coleman's first film, it is a remake of the 1953 film of the same name.

== Plot ==
Jackie Robinson "J.R." Cooper is a kid who loves baseball, and also the son of a former major leaguer now down on his luck (and now a vendor working the stands at games). J.R. parlays his baseball knowledge into becoming manager of the San Diego Padres and leading them to the World Series.

== Cast ==
- Gary Coleman - Jackie Robinson "J.R." Cooper
- Robert Guillaume - Larry Cooper
- Gary Collins - Pete Sloane
- Ed McMahon - Fred Walker
- Tricia O'Neil - Marion Fowler
- Tab Hunter - Bill Lorant

== Production ==
Filming took place at San Diego Stadium.

== Production ==
The television film was made by NBC to enhance Coleman's name recognition and boost his commercial value

Vince Edwards had originally been picked to direct, but quit after two days because he didn't want to work with children.

Director Adell Aldrich said "I was a mother, and that's part of the reason they hired me. Gary was brilliant. Just a natural actor who could memorize his lines after one reading. But his people -- his parents and his representatives -- didn't care how long the kid worked or what he was doing. So it was my job to direct, but also to make sure he was OK. I hugged him every day and let him know I was there for him."

On the project she commented "we weren't trying to win awards, but we did want to make something people would enjoy."

== Release ==
NBC held a special preview of the film after a San Diego Padres game on September 21, 1979. Oddly enough, the day after the film first aired on television, the Padres hired their announcer Jerry Coleman (who also appeared in the film as the team's announcer) as their new manager. This led to some jokes that the team had meant to hire Gary Coleman.

The television movie first aired on Sunday, September 30, 1979.

== Reception ==
=== Ratings ===
It was the 15th highest-rated prime time show of the week, with a Nielsen rating of 21.4.

=== Critical reception ===
Kevin Thomas of the Los Angeles Times liked it, while finding it highly sentimental, he praised the actors and said that Guillaume and Coleman gave winning performances. He also praised director Aldrich as capable of making good films regardless of style and showed range from her previous output which was a darker film, while this one was positive and up lifting.

Tom Shales of The Washington Post did not like it and wrote "Instead of constructing a vehicle designed to display the amazing talents of this youngster while he's at his winning, naturalistic peak, everyone involved elected to make do with a slovenly and underwritten bore."

== Accolades ==
At a dinner ceremony, Sunday evening, December 7, 1980, Gary Coleman, on behalf of the film, accepted the Image Award for "Best Children's Special or Episode in a Series," at the 13th NAACP Image Awards at the Hollywood Palladium.

== Home media ==
The film was released on VHS by Vestron Video in 1984.

== See also ==
- List of baseball films
