= On the Right Track =

1981 American comedy film directed by Lee Philips

- On the Right Track movie poster
- Directed by: Lee Philips
- Written by: Avery Buddy; Richard Moses; Tina Pine
- Produced by: Jim Begg; Ronald Jacobs
- Starring: Gary Coleman; Maureen Stapleton; Michael Lembeck; Lisa Eilbacher; Norman Fell
- Cinematography: Jack L. Richards
- Edited by: Bill Butler
- Music by: Arthur B. Rubinstein
- Distributed by: 20th Century Fox
- Release date: March 6, 1981
- Running time: 97 minutes
- Country: United States
- Language: English
- Budget: $3 million
- Box office: $13 million

On the Right Track is a 1981 American romantic comedy film directed by Lee Philips. It is the feature film debut of Gary Coleman, produced by Ronald Jacobs, and released to theaters by 20th Century Fox in the spring of 1981. The co-stars include Michael Lembeck, Lisa Eilbacher, Bill Russell, Maureen Stapleton, and Norman Fell.

A young, homeless shoeshine 10-year-old boy named Lester (Coleman) is living in a locker at Chicago Union Station. Already a beloved figure among the staff at the station who look after him, and avoiding attempts to move him to an orphanage, he finds great popularity after it is revealed that he has a talent for picking winning horses at the racetrack.

Due to his success on television with the sitcom Diff'rent Strokes, child actor Gary Coleman's popularity led to development of film projects where he could play the lead. An existing script was selected partially due to Coleman's love for trains and reworked for him. With a $3 million budget, filming commenced in May 1980 in Chicago.

It received a number of reviews concluding that it was sappy and simply capitalized on Coleman's TV following, however others found the film charming and well written, with Coleman being a solid actor in his first lead role in a motion picture.

The film grossed $13 million in a domestic box office. On home-video rentals, it was added $10 to 15 million to its revenue.

== Plot ==
10-year-old orphan shoeshine boy Lester lives in a locker in Chicago Union Station. Lester is friendly with most of the station staff and street performers, the only exception being a station official who does not like that Lester works without a permit. Sam, the owner of the station's pizzeria, makes sure he is fed while Robert, in charge of the stations health club, ensures he is properly bathed. Jill Klein, the arcade repair technician, provides him with a history education. Lester in turn cares for the station's homeless bag lady, Mary, by giving her money.

While hanging out with Jill at the arcade, Lester picks a horse for her to bet on, but she doesn't place the wager. She explains that she is more concerned with his well-being of him living in a locker. He fears leaving the station as he could be considered a juvenile delinquent and a runaway.

The shoeshine concessioner calls juvenile services to inform them that an orphan is living in the train station stealing his business, Frank Biscardi is sent to investigate. When he arrives, the concessioner points to Jill so that Frank can investigate. Frank is enthralled by her beauty, and when he asks her about Lester she says that she doesn't know where he is. They start flirting and Frank asks her out. Suddenly the concessioner sees Lester and points his finger at him. All three start chasing him through the station. They catch him, and Lester tries to get away by naming the winners of a horse race.

Frank and Jill escort him out. Lester is terrified of going out. As they walk out there is a shootout between bandits and the police. They arrive to a decrepit shelter where they leave him. Jill and Frank go on a date, but she feels he isn't right for him. Frank falls in love, and upon returning to the police station he explains to a colleague what went down and realizes that Lester picked the right horses. At the same time, Lester escapes the shelter.

Realizing that Lester can pick winning horses, Frank finds Jill and explains that he changed his mind about him and would like to help him further. They find him at the station and tell him that he and Jill will have dinner, and will sort it out so he doesn't have to live in the station nor a shelter in order to find him a place to stay. At their dinner, Frank and Jill fall for each other, but when she finds out he only wants the winning horses for the tracks, she leaves the house. Eventually, he convinces her that it's the only to help him.

Eventually Frank bets on the horses but the revenue agency taxes him, so he gambles with the mob where he makes a million. The mobsters are upset and decide to follow Frank who has the money in a briefcase. Frank decides to hide the money in Lester's locker and put him in the briefcase. Lester finds that it is too much hassle and decides to return to the train station to live.

When Lester returns, many are looking for him including the mayor, and they are shocked that an orphan lives in the station. He makes a deal with the mayor that he can win a million dollars for the city if he can run his own business in the station, as long as the money goes to school, sanitation and social services. Frank says that he and Jill will get married and adopt Lester within a week.

Eventually, Lester finds out that the money raised for the city will go to the banks, and he refuses to help the mayor anymore. He returns to shining shoes. However, Frank and Jill decide to bring him home and start a family.

== Cast ==
- Gary Coleman as Lester
- Maureen Stapleton as Mary
- Norman Fell as The Mayor
- Michael Lembeck as Frank Biscardi
- Lisa Eilbacher as Jill Klein
- Bill Russell as Robert
- Herb Edelman as Sam
- C. Thomas Cunliffe as Shoe Shine Concessioner
- Nathan Davis as Mario
- Fern Persons as Flower Lady
- Mike Genovese as Louis
- Harry Gorsuch as Harry
- Page Hannah as Sally
- Jami Gertz as Big Girl
- Chelcie Ross as Customer

== Production ==
After his first introduction of the NBC sitcom Diff'rent Strokes in November 1978, child actor Gary Coleman quickly gained popularity, Zephyr Productions, was formed to showcase him in films and telefilms. Coleman's mother Edmonia explained that "it was a script written some time ago for someone else, it was rewritten for Gary reconstructed for him. It was one of several ideas presented us for him. Gary has a very big love for trains, and we thought this might be a good one for him to do". Zephyr Productions, Coleman's production company partnered with executive producers Lawrence L. Kuppin and Harry Evans Sloan. In the script, the story was set in New York, but the filmmakers changed the location to Chicago. With a budget of 3 million dollars, filming started in May 1980. New York Loves Lester and A Guy Could Get Killed Out There were working titles for the project.

== Reception ==
=== Box office ===
On March 6, 1981, the film received a wide release by 20th Century Fox. In the US, the film grossed $13 million and was the 61st highest-grossing film of that year.

Coleman's attorney Harry Evans Sloan explained the film was a financial success and videocassette rentals added $10 to 15 million dollars of revenue.

=== Critical response ===
Gene Siskel of the Chicago Tribune said the film "is a charming motion picture that reveals young Mr. Coleman can act." His overall consensus was that the subplot involving adults dragged down the film but it "manages to convey some beautiful thoughts while offering conventional entertainment" and could also entertain parents.

Roger Ebert of the Chicago Sun-Times gave it two and a half stars. Ebert enjoyed Coleman's performance and wrote on "several occasions when Coleman steals a scene from his colleagues and just walks away with it. He has dialogue, doubletakes, one-liners, and reactions that are absolutely inimitable." He felt that the down side of the movie was when "the movie strays away from Coleman's special qualities and gets distracted with several subplots."

Kevin Thomas of the Los Angeles Times, while pointing out that the film was created as a vehicle for Coleman, had good acting, writing, and photography. Of the film he said that director Lee Phillips "with the help of a fine cameraman, Jack Richards, has made On the Right Track handsome, energetic and even, at times, lyrical. Although written especially for Coleman to show him off as ever the clever heart-tugger, On the Right Track actually has some believable adults for ballast. Writers-producers Tina Pine, Avery Buddy, and Richard Moses have created likably less-than-perfect human beings for Eilbacher and Michael Lembeck to play."

Terry Lawson of The Journal Herald found the movie shallow, but watchable. Lawson, who expected a bad performance by Coleman, said, "Coleman actually seems to have been calmed by the process of making movies. He's not half bad here, considering the role is obviously custom made. Unfortunately, the film is a real trifle, much more of a made-for-television property than a theater attraction."

Richard Freedman of the Times-News felt it "was a sentimental comedy that unfortunately gets derailed early on," however he did note the film had a good nature.

Michael Blowen of The Boston Globe did not like the film; he found the directing weak and added that "the plot rambles on in its own farcical, pedestrian fashion until you expect the entire cast to gag on their lines."

Janet Maslin of The New York Times didn't care for the film. She said it "is a vehicle for Mr. Coleman that depends entirely on the premise that he is lovable. Only his most ardent television fans are likely to accept this."

Richard Labonté of the Ottawa Citizen found it simple and explained that "it is a film for the easily entertained and the eagerly unenlightened." He liked Coleman and said "against all odds, the preciously precocious performer, in a role written especially for him, is funny."

Zenobia Jonell Gerald of The Sacramento Bee said that the characters were appealing and had some poignant moments. She praised the director and the lead cast by saying "Coleman's personality and his remarkable comic timing are hard to resist. And under Philips’ guidance, Coleman emerges as a refreshing charmer who is called upon to do more than just be a wise-cracking kid. Coleman Isn't the only one to benefit from Philips direction; Lembeck and Eilbacher are a pleasure to watch as their own story unfolds."

Patrice Smith of The Evansville Courier found that the story lacked "in logic is but one of many which destroy the film's believability. But Coleman’s natural charm the strength of supporting players and a generally upbeat script successfully overcome the story's inherent abound." Her overall consensus is that "director Lee Phillips makes the most of his expansive location using suspended-in-air shots and plenty of chase scenes to heighten the film's pacing. Rated PG for just a smidgen of adult language. On the Right Track is by and large an enjoyable kiddie flick with enough adult humor to amuse mom and dad."

Paul Katz of Entertainment Weekly compared the film to the Tom Hanks film The Terminal (2004), where Hanks' character Viktor Navorski lives for months in a John F. Kennedy International Airport terminal.

== See also ==
- List of films about horse racing
