= Steven Eckholdt =

American actor (born 1961)

- Born: September 6, 1961 (age 64); Los Angeles, California, U.S.
- Occupation: Actor
- Years active: 1985–2016

Steven Eckholdt (born September 6, 1961) is an American actor. He has appeared in many television series and film roles. He is best known as Shaun in The Runnin' Kind, Patrick Flannigan in L.A. Law, Mark Robinson in Friends, and Doug Westin in The West Wing.

== Career ==
=== Television ===
Eckholdt began his screen career in the mid-1980s. He began with appearances on TV shows like The Love Boat and 21 Jump Street. He landed recurring roles on WIOU (a short-lived CBS series in 1991) and Life Goes On.

Eckholdt's main screen appearances have included L.A. Law, Melrose Place, It's Like, You Know..., Providence, The West Wing and The L Word. His guest starring appearances include shows like Baywatch, Wings, and more.

Eckholdt played the role of Mark Robinson, a co-worker and later love interest of Rachel Green (played by Jennifer Aniston) in the sitcom Friends. He appeared in five episodes of Season 3 and one episode of the final season, Season 10.

His role in the 1997 TV pilot for the sitcom Dads is seen by test audiences at the Television Preview, a marketing research operation in which participants are told they are seeing a pilot for a new program.

Also in 1997, Eckholdt appeared in "The Puppy Episode" of the sitcom Ellen, and in The Practice.

In 2003, Eckholdt starred in the CBS television sitcom My Big Fat Greek Life which was based on the blockbuster comedy feature film, My Big Fat Greek Wedding. He starred as Thomas Miller, the character originally portrayed as Ian Miller by John Corbett in the movie version.

In 2010, he also appeared in the seventh season of Two and a Half Men as Brad, a charming lawyer who causes the breakup of Charlie and Chelsea.

=== Film ===
In the 1986 film The Wraith, Eckholdt played the character George in the film's opening sequence.

He also starred as Peter Albright in Santa Who? (2000), a TV movie featuring Leslie Nielsen.

In 2003 he appeared in Secret Santa with Jennie Garth and Comfort and Joy with Nancy McKeon.

In 2008 he appeared in Our First Christmas with Julie Warner and Dixie Carter.

Other movie roles include Message in a Bottle (1999) and Arcadia (2012).

== Filmography ==
=== Television ===
Year	Title	Role	Notes
1985	Between the Darkness and the Dawn	Student in Jack Parrish's Class	television debut Television Movie
1986	The Love Boat	Eric Matthews	Episode: "Hippies and Yuppies/Frat Wars/Return of the Lambdas"
1986	St. Elsewhere	Dino Perelli	Episode: "Brand New Bag"
1988	The Charmings	Mike	Episode: "Birth of a Salesman" credited as Steve Eckholdt
1988	14 Going on 30	Adult Danny O'Neil/Harold Forndexter	Television Movie credited as Steven Eckholdt
1988	The Taking of Flight 847: The Uli Derickson Story	Robert Stethem	Television Movie
1988	Go Toward the Light	Jeff	Television Movie
1988-1989	Day by Day	Dennis	2 episodes
1989	She's the Sheriff	Jonathan Gagen	recurring role; 3 episodes
1989	Hunter	Brian Lander	Episode: "Investment in Death" credited as Steve Eckholdt
1989	Baywatch	Andrew Garrison	Episode: "Cruise Ship" credited as Steve Eckholdt
1990	Matlock	Mark Carter	Episode: "The Student" credited as Steve Eckholdt
1990	21 Jump Street	Lance Schalin	Episode: "Shirts and Skins"
1990	Working Girl	unknown	Episode: "It's Only Love"
1990	The Bakery	Lyle 'Buck' Buchanan	Television Movie
1990-1991	WIOU	Rick Singer	recurring role; 4 episodes
1991	Jake and the Fatman	Richard	Episode: "It Never Entered My Mind"
1991-1994	L.A. Law	Patrick Flanagan/Cleland	recurring role; 9 episodes
1992	Life Goes On	Kenny Stollmark Jr.	recurring role; 6 episodes
1992	Grapevine	Thumper Klein	recurring role; 6 episodes
1992	Condition: Critical	Tommy Cox	Television Movie
1993	Wings	Connor	Episode: "Exit Laughing"
1993	Message from Nam	Peter Wilson	Television Movie
1993-1994	Melrose Place	Robert Wilson	recurring role; 10 episodes
1995	The Stranger Beside Me	Detective Bill Rounder	Television Movie
1995	The Monroes	James Monroe	recurring role; 8 episodes
1996	The Naked Truth	Daniel	Episode: "Woman Loses Space Alien, Finds God!"
1996	Daytona Beach	Gavin Travers	Television Movie
1996	Champs	David	2 episodes
1997	Ellen	Richard	Episode: "The Puppy Episode"
1997	The Practice	Assistant District Attorney Chris Kelton	3 episodes
1997	George & Leo	Chip	Episode: "The Thanksgiving Show"
1997	Dads	Tom	Television Short
1997, 2004	Friends	Mark Robinson	recurring role; 6 episodes
1998	I Know What You Did	Detective Richard Younger	Television Movie
1998	Maximum Bob	Dr. Kevin Michaels	Episode: "A Little Tail"
1998	Family Blessings	Chris	Television Movie
1999	Love American Style	Guy	Television Movie segment "Love And the Blind Date"
1999-2001	It's Like, You Know...	Robbie Graham	series regular; 26 episodes
2000	Grapevine	David Klein	5 episodes
2000	That's Life	Professor Dwyer	2 episodes
2000	Santa Who?	Peter Albright	Episode: Television Movie
2001	Family Law	Alex	3 episodes
2001	And Never Let Her Go	Colm Connolly	Television Movie
2001	Providence	Congressman Joe Connelly	recurring role; 9 episodes
2003	My Big Fat Greek Life	Thomas Miller	recurring role; 7 episodes
2003	Comfort and Joy	Sam	Television Movie
2003	Secret Santa	John Martin Carter	Television Movie
2003-2006	The West Wing	Doug Westin	recurring role; 6 episodes
2004	Desperate Housewives	Officer Rick Thompson	Episode: "Come in, Stranger"
2005	Las Vegas	Senator Billy Cole	Episode: "One Nation, Under Surveillance"
2005	NCIS	Dr. Brad Pitt	Episode: "SWAK"
2005	CSI: Miami	Dale Livingston	Episode: "From the Grave"
2005-2006	Half & Half	Gus Mason	recurring role; 3 episodes
2006	Boston Legal	Assistant District Attorney Richard Kelton	Episode: "Word Salad Days"
2006	Split Decision	Ted Brennan	Television Movie
2006	Shark	Dr. Mitchell Sterling	Episode: "Dr. Feelbad"
2006	Twenty Good Years	Doug McDowell	Episode: "They Shoot Turkeys, Don't They?"
2006-2007	The L Word	Henry	recurring role; 8 episodes
2006-2007	Smith	Steve	2 episodes
2008	Our First Christmas	Tom Baer-Noll	Television Movie
2009	Cold Case	Ben Feldman/Foster	Episode: "Witness Protection"
2010	CSI: Crime Scene Investigation	John Dudek	Episode: "Long Ball"
2010	Two and a Half Men	Brad Howe/Brad Harlow	2 episodes
2010	Southland	Rich Ryerson	Episode: "Butch & Sundance"
2011	Big Mike	Trent McCauley	Television Movie
2012	Undercover Bridesmaid	Cousin Eldridge	Television Movie
2012	Bunheads	Grant	Episode: "Inherit the Wind"
2012	Warehouse 13	Gil Moorpark	Episode: "Endless Wonder"
2012	Castle	Michael Case	Episode: "Secret Santa"
2013	Bones	Charlie McCord	Episode: "The Lady on the List"
2014	Maron	Gary Ryan	Episode: "Marc on Talking Dead"
2015	Rizzoli & Isles	Ronald Wallace	Episode: "Family Matters"
2016	Wild Seeds	Sherman	Television Short

=== Film ===
Year	Title	Role	Notes
1986	About Last Night...	Man in Bar	film debut
1986	The Wraith	George in Daytona	
1988	For Keeps?	Ronald	credited as Steve Eckholdt
1989	The Runnin' Kind	Shaun	
1997	Just in Time	Jake Bedford	credited as Steve Ekholdt
1998	Making Sandwiches	Steve	Short Film
1999	Message in a Bottle	David	
2000	Leaving Drew	Oliver	Short Film
2012	Arcadia	Mr. Acres	
2015	The Paper Boat	Doctor Goldberg	
2016	A Taylor Story	David	Short Film
