= Firefighter (film) =

- Genre: Drama
- Written by: Kathryn Montgomery
- Directed by: Robert Michael Lewis
- Starring: Nancy McKeon
- Theme music composer: Dana Kaproff
- Country of origin: United States
- Original language: English

Production
- Executive producer: Greg H. Sims
- Producers: Robert Michael Lewis; Paul Freeman; Nancy McKeon; Robert Lloyd Lewis
- Production location: Vancouver
- Cinematography: Frank Watts
- Editor: Corky Ehlers
- Running time: 100 minutes
- Production companies: Forest Hills Productions; Embassy Communications

Original release
- Network: CBS
- Release: September 23, 1986

Firefighter is a 1986 American made-for-television drama film directed by Robert Michael Lewis. The film is based on the true story of Cindy Fralick, the first female firefighter of the Los Angeles County Fire Department.

== Plot ==
Situated in the early 1980s, the plot focuses on Cindy Fralick, a parking enforcement officer who is uninspired by her job. One day, she witnesses the injuries of an accident and decides she wants to help people. She considers applying at the Los Angeles County Fire Department, but feels discouraged because there are no female firefighters in Los Angeles. She passes the written exams, but the people at the oral exams have no confidence she will be strong enough to pass the physical tests. When her husband suddenly files for divorce, she initially changes her mind about her career ambitions, until her best friend Sharon encourages her not to give up. The fire department staff doesn't take her training seriously, but she proves to be one of the best during physical tests.

Cindy soon becomes the talk of the town, earning the respect of all her co-trainees. After the training, she becomes the first woman in sixty years to pass the tests. She enters the Academy, but is required to cut her hair short. She is treated horribly and considers dropping out. Her Chief encourages her to allow herself to get used to the military treatment, assuring her it will only take nine weeks. After finally becoming an official firefighter, she gets a lot of media attention. This upsets her because all she wanted was a job, not to be anyone's hero. Her colleagues are initially annoyed by her, because they feel they can't be themselves in the presence of a woman. However, she is soon one of the guys and wins the heart of fellow firefighter Mike.

On her first real job, she wins the respect of her bosses by not showing any fear of the fire. She starts going out with Mike, but he soon irritates her. She thinks it's because he isn't romantic enough, but Cindy feels that it's too soon after the divorce for her to be involved with someone. Meanwhile, she decides to become a paramedic, but still has to deal with prejudice. In the end, she saves a heroin addict who overdoses. She decides not to end her relationship with Mike.

== Cast ==
- Nancy McKeon as Cindy Fralick
- Vincent Irizarry as Mike
- Barry Corbin as Captain Johnson
- Guy Boyd as Captain Cauley
- Amanda Wyss as Marilyn
- Whip Hubley as Lance
- James Whitmore, Jr. as Captain Bukowski
- Ed Lauter as B.C. Thompson
