= Style & Substance =

- Genre: Sitcom
- Created by: Peter Tolan
- Directed by: Jay Sandrich; Iris Dugow; Brian K. Roberts; Peter Tolan
- Starring: Jean Smart; Nancy McKeon; Heath Hyche; Linda Kash; Joseph Maher; Alan Autry
- Composer: Brad Hatfield
- Country of origin: United States
- Original language: English
- No. of seasons: 1
- No. of episodes: 13 (1 unaired)

Production
- Executive producer: Peter Tolan
- Camera setup: Multi-camera
- Running time: 30 minutes
- Production companies: The Cloudland Company; Touchstone Television

Original release
- Network: CBS
- Release: January 5 – September 2, 1998

Style & Substance is an American sitcom television series created by Peter Tolan, starring Jean Smart and Nancy McKeon that aired on CBS from January 5 to September 2, 1998.

== Premise ==
Jean Smart is Chelsea Stevens, a Martha Stewart-like star of a how-to home show, and Nancy McKeon is her producer, Jane Sokol, a small-town girl new to New York City. Chelsea Stevens was an expert cook, decorator, and party planner who knew much more about thread-count than she did relationships. She was well-meaning at times, but her narcissism usually got in the way of actually understanding anyone else's problems. Stories generally centered on Chelsea's predilection for saying and doing outrageous things, and Jane's efforts to clean up the messes that resulted from Chelsea's antics.

== Cast and characters ==
- Jean Smart as Chelsea Stevens:
  An egomaniac who built a media empire devoted to cooking and decorating, Chelsea found an escape from an unhappy childhood through collecting miniatures and modeling herself after television's "Yankee Gourmet," Gloria Utley (Jean Stapleton). She finds the need to control everything and is so self-centered that she's generally oblivious to the needs and feelings of everyone around her. These are precisely the reasons why her marriage to Grant Stevens ended.
- Nancy McKeon as Jane Sokol:
  A level-headed but somewhat timid Omaha native, Jane was born into a close-knit family. She relocated to New York after taking a job with Feber Communications, which bought out Chelsea's company. Although she's frequently exasperated by Chelsea's audacious antics, she quickly establishes herself as the diva's much-needed best friend and confidant.
- Joseph Maher as Hadley John:
  Hailing from the United Kingdom, Mr. John is an interior designer and openly gay man who continuously regales his coworkers with intimate personal stories about his longtime life-partner, Guy. He exudes a dignified sophistication, although he's absolutely spineless when confronted, and has never revealed his sexual orientation to his elderly parents.
- Linda Kash as Trudy Weissman:
  A Jewish New Yorker who's unafraid to say exactly what's on her mind, Trudy is a food stylist who has a knack for making items such as oil, paint, and lard look delicious. She's been unlucky in love and tends to prattle on about it endlessly.
- Heath Hyche as Terry:
  Raised on a farm, Terry is dimwitted and childlike. Chelsea gave him a job as her personal assistant as a favor to his aunt. Although he's utterly inept and frequently has Chelsea at her wit's end, he has such a puppy-dog-like adoration for her that she doesn't have the heart to let him go.
- Alan Autry as Earl:
  Self-described as Chelsea's gardener/handyman/spiritual advisor, Earl has the outward appearance of a lumberjack and the vocal inflection of Elvis Presley. He tends to breeze into a room, state his piece, and then dart out the door to continue his chores. Earl moved North from Memphis with wife Carol Ann, who broke his heart when she left him for a drywaller.
- Vyto Ruginis as Bobby:
  Chelsea's lawyer is a shameless womanizer and unabashed sleazeball who's petty and vindictive, which makes him extremely proficient in his profession.

== Production ==
In the early 1990s, following the publication of the magazine Martha Stewart Living and its spin-off TV show, the businesswomen rose to prominence, gradually becoming a household name. Television writer Peter Tolan was asked to model a character after her, although he was adamant that the result wasn't a parody or personal attack; Stewart had merely served as the initial inspiration. Jean Smart first received a script in the mid-1990s, but she opted to star in the short-lived CBS sitcom High Society instead.

Eventually, Kathleen Turner took the role of Chelsea Stevens, and a pilot was shot for ABC in 1996. Robby Benson directed the episode, which costarred Lisa Rieffel, Anthony Mangano, Melinda McGraw, and Andrew Bilgore. Michael Eisner, then the head of The Walt Disney Company, personally phoned Turner to tell her that he loved the show, and it was promised a slot on the fall schedule, but the network reneged. Heartbroken, Turner speculated that this was because Disney planned to go into business with Martha Stewart, but Tolan later remarked that it was dropped due to a poor reaction with test audiences. Although Disney rejected it for the recently acquired ABC network, they continued to produce under the Touchstone Television banner. Turner bowed out as the show was redeveloped for CBS, leaving producers desperate to fill the role, so they approached various other stars such as Julie Andrews.

After the cancellation of High Society, Smart shifted her focus to live theatre and was disinterested in returning to episodic television. She turned down two more requests to play Chelsea, so the producers decided to get creative. After receiving a bouquet of flowers every day for over a week, a box containing thousands of dollars' worth of Disney merchandise arrived on her doorstep, along with a letter addressed to her 8-year-old son. The boy was urged to persuade his mother to read the revised script, and he was bribed with the promise of endless toys and the ability to skip the lines at Disneyland if she agreed to star in the show. Tenacious persistence paid off, and Smart finally accepted the part. "I never turned it down because I didn't like it," she remarked.

CBS president Les Moonves suggested Nancy McKeon for the role of Jane, and she was overly enthusiastic about the material. McKeon had recently starred in Can't Hurry Love, which aired on CBS's Monday night schedule along with High Society, and she and Smart appeared together for the network's promotional publicity stunt with Elizabeth Taylor. Once the two ladies had been cast in this series, a genuine friendship blossomed. The supporting cast members were added, and they soldiered into production.

Stewart's show was also produced by CBS, and she became furious with Moonves not only over this sitcom but also The Simple Life, which starred Judith Light as a similar character. The writers attempted to alleviate the situation by devising an ongoing on-screen rivalry between Chelsea and Martha, with the hopes that Stewart would be amused and eventually agree to guest-star. Although there was a vague awareness of Stewart's disdain, it was mostly shielded from the cast and crew.

There was a joyous atmosphere on the set, and McKeon later remarked that she had some of the best times of her life working on the show. However, as production was underway, Joseph Maher was diagnosed with a brain tumor and began losing his peripheral vision, which forced him to use a cane. Then at the Christmas party, one of the writers prophetically joked that since the production had been going so smoothly, "We're screwed!"

Placed in the same timeslot where High Society had aired in 1995, the show premiered in January 1998, temporarily bumping the soon-to-be-canceled Cybill off the air. Suddenly, the atmosphere turned dour as the press fixated on Stewart and harassed the cast regarding her dissatisfaction. Stewart never publicly addressed the series, but in reaction to overwhelming media interest, she issued a snide statement which read: "CBS is free to broadcast any program it chooses to. I would hope that it would be of the highest quality and educational value." Following the broadcast of the fifth show less than a month later, CBS suddenly dropped the series from their schedule. As a studio audience piled in for the taping of an episode, the crew received the devastating news. The lead actresses each went on to publicly speculate that the abrupt cancellation was a direct result of Stewart's malcontentment.

Although it wasn't considered a hit during its brief time on the air, the show garnered consistent ratings and returned to the schedule over the summer, just as news spread about the death of Maher. The show's final episode, "Do Not Go Squealing Into That Good Night," was never broadcast, instead, CBS aired a rerun of JAG. The plot concerned Chelsea's quarrel with her neighbor, Mrs. Oliver (Mary Gillis). There was discussion of property lines and fences, and Chelsea was accused of backing over Mrs. Oliver's pig with her car. Probably uncoincidentally, this is the only episode that directly skewered Stewart, who had a longtime feud with neighbor Harry B. Macklowe, and was accused of backing her vehicle into his landscaper, pinning the man to a fence.

Smart reprised her role without fanfare in the 2019 revival of Mad About You, which was produced by Tolan. In an episode entitled "Real Estate for Beginners," she appeared as Chelsea Stevens-Kobolakis. Seemingly happily remarried to unseen Greek shipping heir Stavros Kobolakis, Chelsea hosts "Better Together," a weekend team-building workshop for realtors that Paul and Jamie attend, mistakenly thinking it's a marriage seminar which is being held in a nearby room. The couple is continuously berated by Chelsea and can't figure out why. The cast was concerned that the story was too far-fetched, so Tolan asked Smart to play the part of the lecturer, knowing that she could make it believable. Once she agreed, the role was tailored to Chelsea Stevens as an inside-joke between the pair. No overt references to this show were made, although Chelsea had an inept assistant named Steve (Michael J. Henderson), who is uncannily reminiscent of Terry.

== Episodes ==
No.	Title	Directed by	Written by	Original release date	Prod. code	Viewers (millions)
1	"Pilot: Style & Substance"	Jay Sandrich	Peter Tolan	January 5, 1998	E701	11.29
Jane Sokol is sent to New York to manage Chelsea Stevens' magazine and TV show after it is bought by the Ferber Corporation, but she's totally thrown by her dealings with Chelsea, who goes through her purse and meddles in her relationship with her ex-fiance (Peter Krause).
2	"A Trip to Chelseatown"	Jay Sandrich	Russ Woody	January 12, 1998	E702	11.17
When Chelsea decides to redecorate Jane's apartment for a magazine makeover, she convinces a reluctant Jane to stay with her during the renovation; Jane discovers how eccentric Chelsea really is when she reveals her biggest secret – Chelseatown, a miniature town she designed in her attic.
3	"The Boss and Other Disasters"	Jay Sandrich	Peter Tolan	January 19, 1998	E706	9.00
Jane wants to make a good impression on her visiting boss, but she is horrified by the personality clash between Chelsea and the condescending Mr. Ferber (John O'Hurley) who has become hung up on Chelsea after a one-night stand.
4	"A Recipe for Disaster"	Jay Sandrich	Mike Chessler & Chris Alberghini	January 26, 1998	E708	7.94
Jane surprises Chelsea by inviting her childhood idol, world famous gourmet Gloria Utley (Jean Stapleton), to appear alongside her on Live with Regis & Kathie Lee – unaware that Gloria is now a burned-out boozer.
5	"Chelsea Gets an Opinion"	Iris Dugow	Donald Beck	February 2, 1998	E707	9.90
After being labeled frivolous and empty-headed in a magazine article, Chelsea jumps at the chance to boost her public image by participating in a Politically Incorrect-style talk show to discuss current events in the Middle East.
6	"Terry, We Hardly Knew Ye"	Jay Sandrich	Gary Janetti	July 22, 1998	E703	6.11
No longer able to deal with the incompetence of her assistant Terry, Chelsea asks Jane to fire him – which winds up being easier said than done; meanwhile Trudy and Mr. John fawn over Terry's replacement, Matthew (Robert Gant).
7	"Office Management for Beginners"	Jay Sandrich	Gary Janetti	July 29, 1998	E704	5.43
Chelsea incites an office rivalry between Jane and her arrogant lawyer Bobby (Vyto Ruginis) in an effort to cut costs so she can buy an expensive super-equipped van; When Jane cuts Bobby's salary to provide the money for the vehicle, Bobby retaliates by playing a series of practical jokes on her.
8	"The Plate"	Brian K. Roberts	Susan Beavers	August 5, 1998	E710	6.76
Chelsea becomes consumed with getting her hands on Jane's valuable Chinese dinner plate, but when Jane refuses to part with it for sentimental reasons, Chelsea uses an office mix-up to get her hands on it; meanwhile, Trudy dates a guy who seems too good to be true.
9	"Chelsea's First Date"	Jay Sandrich	Donald Beck	August 12, 1998	E711	6.23
Jane convinces Chelsea to accept a dinner invitation from an old friend, Jeff (Michael Nouri) – her first date since her divorce – but is shocked when Chelsea announces her sudden engagement to the man.
10	"No Soap, Romeo"	Jay Sandrich	Daphne Pollon	August 19, 1998	E709	6.03
Jane begins dating charming soap opera star Dax Chandler (Larry Poindexter), ignoring Chelsea's warnings that he's too vain and self-absorbed; meanwhile, Terry is bullied by a creepy delivery man and Chelsea finds herself addicted to soap operas.
11	"Chelsea's Ex"	Jay Sandrich	Ian Praiser	August 26, 1998	E705	5.98
Chelsea thinks her ex-husband Grant (Doug Sheehan) wants her back when she and Jane run into him at a charity dinner with his latest girlfriend – who is Chelsea's spitting image; meanwhile, Mr. John is forced by his lover to tell his aged parents that he's gay.
12	"I Went to a Garden Party"	Jay Sandrich	Chris Alberghini & Mike Chessler	September 2, 1998	E712	6.12
In an effort to win recognition as a humanitarian, Chelsea agrees to host a garden party for a charitable foundation in the fight against substance abuse; unfortunately, she buys fresh produce from a roadside vendor and mistakenly serves psychedelic mushrooms to her guests. Meanwhile, Terry finds a wingnut in his candy bar, so Trudy writes a letter of complaint that lands them both in hot water.
13	"Do Not Go Squealing Into That Good Night"	Peter Tolan	Daphne Pollon	Unaired	E713	N/A
Chelsea is blamed for killing the pet pig of her obnoxious neighbor Mrs. Oliver, which in fact was accidentally run over by the last person anyone would suspect: Jane.

== Reception ==
Reviews were mixed, although Smart was routinely praised for her performance, and the show vanished so quickly that assessments were predominantly based on the pilot. The show's title prompted numerous critics to pen variations of the same joke: Style & Substance has neither.

Variety's Ray Richmond was overtly critical, stating that Smart "appears to be having plenty of fun in an over-the-top sort of way. The problem is that she’s playing a cartoon character." However, he went on to praise Joseph Maher for his performance as Mr. John, concluding that "in a perfect world, we’d see more of him and less of Chelsea and Jane." The Examiner's Tim Goodman was weary due to similarities with NBC's Fired Up, but remarked "Smart is absolutely brilliant in this role and you can't get enough of her."

The Los Angeles Times' Howard Rosenberg claimed, "The more episodes you see, the funnier and more likable Chelsea and Style & Substance get." The Chicago Tribune's staff seemed particularly taken with the show. Steve Johnson gave a glowing review, stating the show "is a delectable and strongly flavored confection about a Martha Stewart type," and he celebrated Smart for "play[ing] her with infectious gusto." The same paper's Allen Johnson called Smart's performance "nearly flawless," and also commended the show's "cleverly written material." People Magazine's Terry Kelleher gave the show a B-rating, remarking that it's "often deliciously funny."
