= My Big Fat Greek Life =

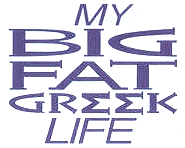
- Genre: Sitcom
- Based on: My Big Fat Greek Wedding
- Developed by: Nia Vardalos; Marsh McCall
- Starring: Nia Vardalos; Lainie Kazan; Steven Eckholdt; Gia Carides; Louis Mandylor; Andrea Martin; Michael Constantine
- Composers: John Adair; Steve Hampton; Chris Wilson
- Country of origin: United States
- Original language: English
- No. of seasons: 1
- No. of episodes: 7

Production
- Executive producers: Marsh McCall; Peter Traugott; Rita Wilson
- Camera setup: Multi-camera
- Running time: 30 minutes
- Production companies: Brad Grey Television; Marsh McCall Productions; Playtone Productions; Sony Pictures Television

Original release
- Network: CBS
- Release: February 24 – April 13, 2003

My Big Fat Greek Life is an American television sitcom that aired on CBS from February 24 to April 13, 2003. The series is a continuation of the 2002 film My Big Fat Greek Wedding and was produced by Sony Pictures Television and Tom Hanks' Playtone Productions for CBS. The two lead characters' names are changed, from Toula and Ian, to Nia and Thomas.

Series star Nia Vardalos also oversaw the show as one of the co-executive producers, along with Hanks and his wife Rita Wilson, who made a guest appearance in one episode as Nia's cousin.

== Premise ==
The series, which is set in Chicago, follows the main character, Nia Portokalos, a Greek-American woman, as she deals with her family and her new non-Greek husband Thomas Miller, an English teacher who still does not seem to fit in with her family's Greek traditions. Despite the help and interference from her family and her husband, Nia tries her best to stay grounded in various situations.

Besides her husband, the family members in her "life" include her parents Maria and Gus, who own the Greek restaurant where she works; her brother Nick, who is not very bright and feels ambivalent toward Thomas; her wise Aunt Voula; and her gossipy cousin Nikki.

While the series follows on from the movie My Big Fat Greek Wedding, the first names of the leading couple have been changed. In the film, Nia Vardalos' character was Fotoula "Toula" Portokalos; her husband (played in the film by John Corbett) was named Ian Miller.

== Ratings ==
The sitcom premiered with high ratings, averaging 22.9 million viewers. Its debut was the highest-rated premiere of any network sitcom since NBC's Jesse. The following week ratings dropped 28%, averaging 16.5 million viewers, but surpassing FOX's The Simpsons which finished second place. However, the decline in ratings led to the sitcom's eventual cancellation by CBS.

My Big Fat Greek Life : U.S. viewers per episode (millions)

Season	Episode number						
Season	1	2	3	4	5	6	7
1	22.87	16.64	13.34	12.39	9.71	10.08	10.46

Audience measurement performed by Nielsen Media Research

== Cast ==
- Nia Vardalos as Nia Miller
- Lainie Kazan as Maria Portokalos, Nia's mother
- Steven Eckholdt as Thomas Miller, Nia's husband; Eckholdt replaces John Corbett from the films
- Gia Carides as Cousin Nikki, Nia's maternal cousin
- Louis Mandylor as Nick Portokalos, Nia's younger brother
- Andrea Martin as Aunt Voula, Nia's maternal aunt
- Michael Constantine as Gus Portokalos, Nia's father

== Episodes ==
No.	Title	Directed by	Written by	Original release date	U.S. viewers (millions)
1	"The House Gift"	Pamela Fryman	Nia Vardalos & Marsh McCall	February 24, 2003	22.87
Nia and Thomas' return from their honeymoon is complicated by Gus' gift of a house as a wedding present, as they feel it will never be "their" house.
2	"The Empire Strikes Back"	Peter Bonerz	Marsh McCall & Tom Maxwell & Don Woodard	March 2, 2003	16.64
When Nia's parents write out the will and leave the restaurant to Nia, this creates tension between Nia and her brother as she doesn't want the restaurant and he feels slighted by the decision.
3	"Ariana"	Peter Bonerz	Tom Saunders	March 9, 2003	13.34
When Nia's cousin Ariana comes for a visit, her entire family try to get involved in Ariana's life, each for their own agendas.
4	"The Free Lunch"	Peter Bonerz	Aaron Peters & Ross McCall	March 16, 2003	12.39
Gus has been giving a policeman free meals at the restaurant to avoid getting a parking ticket as his truck doesn't have a loading zone permit, but when Nia objects to this arrangement, she has to sort out the paperwork at City Hall herself.
5	"Big Night"	Gail Mancuso	Larry Reitzer	March 30, 2003	9.71
When Thomas tries to impress Gus by saying that he knows Pete Sampras, Nia and the girls try to help Thomas arrange a meeting.
6	"Nick Moves Out"	Gail Mancuso	Miriam Trogdon	April 6, 2003	10.08
When Nick moves out into his own apartment, Maria doesn't know what to do with her new free time.
7	"Greek Easter"	Gail Mancuso	Jeff Rosenthal	April 13, 2003	10.46
Nia attempts to set up a great Easter by inviting Gus' former best friend to the celebrations, but soon realises she is unaware of the reason the two haven't spoken for so long.

Columbia/Tristar Home Entertainment released the series on DVD on November 18, 2003. Today, it is not on any streaming service.
