= Return to Horror High =

1987 film directed by Bill Froehlich

- Theatrical release poster
- Directed by: Bill Froehlich
- Written by: Bill Froehlich; Mark Lisson; Dana Escalante; Greg H. Sims
- Produced by: Mark Lisson
- Starring: Vince Edwards; Brendan Hughes; Scott Jacoby; Lori Lethin; Philip McKeon; Alex Rocco; Maureen McCormick; George Clooney
- Cinematography: Roy H. Wagner
- Edited by: Nancy Forner
- Music by: Stacy Widelitz
- Production company: Balcor Film Investors
- Distributed by: New World Pictures
- Release date: January 9, 1987
- Running time: 95 minutes
- Country: United States
- Language: English
- Budget: $1 million
- Box office: $1.2 million

Return to Horror High is a 1987 American comedy slasher film written and directed by Bill Froehlich and starring Vince Edwards, Brendan Hughes, Scott Jacoby, Lori Lethin, Philip McKeon, and Alex Rocco. Told in a nonlinear format, the plot follows a film production crew who begin to disappear while shooting a movie based on an unsolved killing spree that occurred in a high school. The film features supporting performances from Al Fann, Panchito Gómez, Richard Brestoff, Maureen McCormick, and George Clooney.

== Plot ==
In 1982, the town of Crippen was rocked by a series of murders at Crippen High School. The killer was never caught. Several years later, Cosmic Pictures, headed by sleazy producer Harry Sleerek, arrives in Crippen to make a biographical movie about the crimes titled Horror High. To maximize the production's low budget, the cast and crew temporarily move into the real Crippen High School, where they are to film on location; the lead actress, Callie Cassidy, is hired to play multiple roles. In the midst of the film shoot, multiple disappearances and murders occur, which are subsequently investigated by police Chief Deyner and Officer Tyler. While the bodies are recovered from the school, Chief Deyner and Officer Tyler interview the film's screenwriter, Arthur Lyman, outside, and he recounts the events on-set:

Some days prior, lead actor Oliver informs director Josh Forbes that he is dropping out of the production. Before leaving, he is murdered in an empty wing of the school. Harry immediately replaces Oliver with Steven Blake, a real-life police officer and former Crippen High student. Tensions on set rise when Harry insists Callie show on-screen nudity, while Arthur is forced to repeatedly make script changes to accommodate Harry's requests for more gore. One day, an extra is murdered, followed by Choo Choo, a special effects assistant. Shortly after, cast member Richard Farley is caught in a booby trap that drags his body into a steel-blade industrial fan.

While wandering the high school in-between scenes, Steve recounts to Callie his relationship with his high school girlfriend, Kathy; her father, Crippen's Principal Kastleman, is on-set serving as a technical advisor, but Steve has not seen Kathy in years. Meanwhile, Callie begins noticing that cast and crew are disappearing. Fearing the killer has returned, she and Steve begin their own private investigation. Callie's discomfort is compounded one day while watching the filming of a brutal scene in which the school biology teacher, Richard Birnbaum, is dissected.

Later, Steve notices a photo of Kathy on the set; when he inquires to Principal Kastleman about Kathy's whereabouts, he claims she is in graduate school. That night, Steve and Callie find a trail of blood in the hallway, and discover Harry and Josh's corpses, as well as a trapdoor leading to a basement. In the basement, they find a classroom full of the decomposed victims of the 1982 massacre, all posed in desks. They are confronted by Amos, the school janitor, who attacks Steve. During their fight, Steve inadvertently removes a latex mask from Amos's face, revealing him to actually be Principal Kastleman in disguise. Kastleman explains how years ago, Kathy discovered she was pregnant with Steve's child, after which Kastleman murdered her in a rage and hid her body in the school basement before killing multiple students. Callie and Steve manage to overpower Kastleman, impaling him with a javelin.

In the present, after Arthur finishes recounting the events to Chief Deney and Officer Tyler, the police enter the school to investigate. While they do so, Arthur calls out "all clear" outside, upon which all of the victims–who have been laid in the grass and covered in sheets–rise; they have in fact been alive all along. In reality, Callie and Steve uncovered in their research that Kastleman was in fact the true killer in the 1982 massacre, and killed him in the basement. Harry decided to capitalize on this by devising a mock massacre centered around the revelation as a publicity stunt to help promote the film. In the basement, police find Kastleman, still impaled by the javelin, but alive; he lunges at them, leading them to shoot him multiple times. When they return outside and find the bodies of the film crew inexplicably gone, they assume there is still a killer on the loose.

Later, Arthur sits at a typewriter to compose a new screenplay he has called Return to Horror High, which he intends as a sequel. A framed photo of Principal Kastleman sits on his desk. An unseen figure enters the room and stops at Arthur's typewriter, dripping blood on the pages being typed. Arthur looks up at the unseen figure and says, "Dad?"

== Cast ==
- Lori Lethin as Callie Cassidy / Sarah Walker / Susan
- Brendan Hughes as Steven Blake
- Alex Rocco as Harry Sleerik
- Scott Jacoby as Josh Forbes
- Richard Brestoff as Arthur Lyman Kastleman
- Andy Romano as Principal Kastleman
- Al Fann as Amos
- Pepper Martin as Chief Deyner
- Maureen McCormick as Officer Tyler
- Vince Edwards as Richard Birnbaum
- Michael Eric Kramer as Donny Porter
- George Clooney as Oliver
- Cliff Emmich as Dillon
- Panchito Gómez as Choo Choo
- Marvin J. McIntyre as Robbie Rice
- Philip McKeon as Richard Farley
- Remy O'Neill as Esther Molvania
- John Besmehn as Templeton Smithee
- Darcy DeMoss as Sheri Haines
- Will Etra as Mangles Face / Hatchet Face

== Production ==
=== Development ===
Writer-director Bill Froehlich wrote the screenplay for Return to Horror High over a period of several days. "I just started writing and didn't stop," Froehlich recalled. "It flowed out in just a few days. I wrote late into the night until I couldn't keep my eyes open, only then I would go to sleep. And then I'd wake up early in the morning, fired up to get back into it because the story was running around in my head."

New World Pictures agreed to distribute the film after being impressed by the screenplay, initially offering a budget of $800,000 to help produce the film.

=== Filming ===
Filming for Return to Horror High took place in Los Angeles, California at Charles Hughes Junior High School in Woodland Hills, and Clark Junior High School in Glendale. The production budget was ultimately $1 million. In order to avoid an X-rating, the scene-within-a-scene sequence in which the biology teacher's heart is dissected had to be pared down in post-production.

== Release ==
The film was given a limited release theatrically in the United States by New World Pictures on January 9, 1987. The release expanded in April, with its widest release being 227 theaters. It grossed $1,189,709 at the U.S. box office.

=== Critical response ===
Michael Wilmington of the Los Angeles Times wrote that the film is "laudably offbeat" with "a rich premise," but added: "True life or nightmare, recollection or schlock—each level of "reality" has the same camera angles, the same fake gore, and the same Saturday Night Live-in-the-Charnelhouse style acting. And the triple-twist climax is so wildly unlikely, and depends on such cretinous inattention from some of the cast, that you could only accept it in a drunken stupor." Lou Cedrone of The Baltimore Sun wrote: "As horror films go, this one is not all that gory, but it does well enough to displease the people who don't go for this sort of thing. Are there many of us left?"

Two years after the film's release, an article in Cinefantastique noted: "[Return to Horror High is] a slasher pastiche that garnered significant critical acclaim even as it came close to succumbing at the boxoffice because of what Sims called New World Pictures' inept distribution and promotion." The Blockbuster Video Guide characterizes the film as an "Ambitious low-budget affair, with a film crew making a movie about gory high school murders caught up in a bunch of real slayings. [It] never really takes off due to slack direction."

In his book 150 Movies You Should Die Before You See (2010), film critic Steve Miller writes: "The narrative threads of this low-budget spoof of slasher films are more tangled than the cocaine-fueled fever dreams of Quentin Tarantino. As the end credits start to roll, we start to wonder if this was a movie about real killings or a movie within a movie based on real-life killers. Or... well, you get the idea."

Return to Horror High holds a 0% rating on Rotten Tomatoes based on five reviews.

=== Home media ===
The film was released on DVD by Anchor Bay Entertainment in 2002.

== Sources ==
- Miller, Steve (2010). 150 Movies You Should Die Before You See. New York City, New York: Simon & Schuster. ISBN 978-1-440-50902-5.
- Wagner, Roy H.; Byrne, Wayne (2025). Roy H. Wagner: A Cinematographer's Life Beyond the Shadows. Jefferson, North Carolina: McFarland & Company. ISBN 978-1-476-69379-8.
