= Cameron Dye =

American actor and singer

- Born: April 9, 1959 (age 66); New Orleans, Louisiana, U.S.
- Occupation: Actor
- Spouse: Laura San Giacomo (m. 1990; div. 1998)
- Children: 2

Cameron Dye (born April 9, 1959) is an American actor and singer. He played "Fred" in the movie Valley Girl (1983), and also had roles in The Last Starfighter (1984), National Lampoon's Joy of Sex (1984), Body Rock (1984), Fraternity Vacation (1985), Scenes from the Goldmine (1987), Out of the Dark (1989), Men at Work (1990), and The Tavern (1999).

Dye was born in New Orleans, Louisiana. Dye's family moved around the United States and in the mid-1970s he attended Sylvania High School in Sylvania, Ohio. Later, Dye moved to California and attended Mills High School in Millbrae, California and UCLA. He was married to actress Laura San Giacomo from 1990–1998, with whom he has a son. He also has a son with actress Tracy Middendorf.

Dye is a founding member of The Actors' Gang theatre troupe and has performed in plays for the company.

== Filmography ==
Year	Title	Role	Notes
1983	Valley Girl	Fred Bailey	
1984	The Last Starfighter	Andy	
1984	Joy of Sex	Alan Holt	
1984	Body Rock	E-Z	
1985	Fraternity Vacation	Joe Gillespie	
1985	Heated Vengeance	Bandit	
1987	Scenes from the Goldmine	Niles Dresden	
1987	Stranded	Lt. Scott	
1988	Out of the Dark	Kevin Silvers	
1989	Miami Vice	Det. Jack Andrews	Also w/ Laura San Giacomo
1990	Men at Work	Luzinski	
1992	Deuce Coupe	Link Malone	
1997	The Apocalypse	Lennon	
1997	Cannes Man	Richard Hedd	
1998	Bury the Evidence	The Boyfriend	
1999	The Tavern	Ronnie	
2001	Smallville	Sam Phelan	2 episodes: "Rogue" "Zero"
2002	The Gray in Between	Steve	
2003	CSI: Crime Scene Investigation	Leland Brooks	Episode: "Jackpot"
2006	CSI: NY	Damon Runyon	Episode: "Stuck on You"
2024	Kemba	President Bill Clinton	
