= Marc Rocco =

American film director

- Born: Marc Daniel King; June 19, 1962; North Hollywood, California, U.S.
- Died: May 1, 2009 (aged 46); North Hills, California, U.S.
- Occupations: Film producer, screenwriter, director
- Parent(s): Harvey King (father); Sandra Elaine Garrett (mother); Alex Rocco (stepfather)

Marc Rocco (June 19, 1962 – May 1, 2009) was an American film director, film producer and screenwriter.

Marc Rocco was born Marc Daniel King in North Hollywood, to Harvey King and Sandra Elaine Garrett. Later divorcing King, Garrett married actor Alex Rocco in 1964, who adopted Marc.

== Career ==
Marc Rocco directed several films including Scenes from the Goldmine, Dream a Little Dream, Where the Day Takes You, and Murder in the First.

== Death ==
On May 1, 2009, Marc Rocco died during his sleep in San Fernando Valley.

== Filmography ==
- Scenes from the Goldmine (1987)
- Dream a Little Dream (1989)
- Where the Day Takes You (1992)
- Teresa's Tattoo (1994) (producer only)
- Murder in the First (1995)
- The Jacket (2005) (producer only)
- Take (2008) (producer only)
