= The Runnin' Kind =

- Theatrical release poster
- Directed by: Max Tash
- Written by: Max Tash; Pleasant Gehman
- Produced by: Harry Knapp
- Starring: David Packer; Steven Eckholdt; Larry Cox; Tom Shell; Brie Howard; Richard Manheim
- Cinematography: Max Tash
- Edited by: Joel Bender
- Music by: Guy Moon
- Production company: Metro-Goldwyn-Mayer
- Distributed by: United Artists
- Release date: September 8, 1989
- Running time: 105 minutes
- Country: United States
- Language: English

The Runnin' Kind is a 1989 American comedy film directed by Max Tash and written by Max Tash and Pleasant Gehman. The film stars David Packer, Steven Eckholdt, Larry Cox, Tom Shell, Brie Howard and Richard Manheim. The film was released on September 8, 1989, by United Artists.

== Plot ==
An Ohio teen moves to Los Angeles to find fame as a rock musician and to find a drummer.

== Cast ==
- David Packer as Joey Curtis
- Steven Eckholdt as Shaun
- Larry Cox as Rudy
- Tom Shell as Carl
- Brie Howard as "Thunder"
- Richard Manheim as Mike Tataglia
- Brenda Lilly as The Receptionist
- Kenneth Tigar as Stan Shank
- John Carter as Richard Curtis
- Keith Mills as Mr. Dickstein
- Susan Strasberg as Carol Curtis
- Susan Ursitti as Marsha
- Juliette Lewis as Amy Curtis
- Ric Mancini as Mr. Tataglia
- Janaki as Jesse
- Pleasant Gehman as Linda
- Joe Wood as Tyler
- Phil Rubenstein as Burt
- Bernie Bernstein as Mick
- James Cromwell as Uncle Phil
- Julie Cobb as Aunt Barbara
- Rosie Flores as Carla
- Marilyn Reins as Marsky
- Laura Bennett as Chris
- Iris Berry as Girl In Line
- Joey Miyashima as Eddie
- Bobby Nosea as Transvestite
- El Duce as "El Duce"
- John William Young as Steve the Engineer
- Rodney Bingenheimer as Rodney
- Richard Dubin as Detective Watson
- Rob Moran as Jerk In Jeep
- Kenneth Danziger as Frank
- Mitch Carter as Stagehand
- Michael David Lally as Michael
- Bobbie Brat as Robin
- Elisa Tash as Martha
- Ben Kronen as Mr. Salzman
