= Bloody Birthday =

1981 American slasher film by Ed Hunt

- Directed by: Ed Hunt
- Written by: Ed Hunt; Barry Pearson
- Produced by: Gerald T. Olson
- Starring: Lori Lethin; Melinda Cordell; Julie Brown; Susan Strasberg; José Ferrer
- Cinematography: Stephen L. Posey
- Edited by: Ann E. Mills
- Music by: Arlon Ober
- Production company: Judica Productions
- Distributed by: Rearguard Productions
- Release date: April 28, 1981
- Running time: 85 minutes
- Country: United States
- Language: English

Bloody Birthday is a 1981 American independent slasher film directed by Ed Hunt, produced by Gerald T. Olson, and starring Susan Strasberg, José Ferrer, and Lori Lethin. Its plot follows a group of three children born on the same day during a solar eclipse who begin committing murders on their tenth birthdays. Despite mixed reception, it has since accrued a cult following.

== Plot ==
On June 9, 1970, at a hospital in fictional Meadowville, California, three women give birth at the same time during a solar eclipse. Two boys and a girl are born - Curtis Taylor, Debbie Brody, and Steven Seton.

Ten years later, on June 1, 1980, Annie Smith and Duke Benson, a young couple, are murdered in a cemetery by unseen assailants. The next day, the town sheriff and Debbie's father, James Brody, goes to the local primary school, where Debbie, Curtis and Steven are friends and classmates. James shows the class a jump rope handle that was found at the scene of yesterday's crime, but fails to obtain any new information about the murders. Later, after school, Debbie is playing in the backyard with Curtis and Steven. After Debbie shows her dad that the handle of her jump rope is missing, she gets Steven to beat him to death with a baseball bat, and the children frame the death as an accidental fall. Debbie notices that their classmate Timmy Russell has witnessed the murder.

After Sheriff Brody's funeral, Curtis and Steve lure Timmy to a junkyard and lock him inside an old refrigerator. Timmy manages to escape and tries to tell his older sister Joyce about the incident, but she doesn't believe him. A few days later, Curtis murders schoolteacher Mrs. Viola Davis. The children also attempt to kill Timmy and Joyce, but fail. That night, Joyce talks with Timmy about horoscopes; she tells him that—because a solar eclipse that occurred during the births of the three children blocked Saturn, the planet controlling the way a person treats other people—something is missing from their personalities. Meanwhile, Curtis murders two teens having sex in a van with Debbie's dad's revolver.

At the children's birthday party on June 9, Curtis tricks Joyce into believing that he poisoned the cake to make her look crazy to everyone. That evening, Debbie's older sister Beverly discovers a scrapbook owned by Debbie, which contains photos and news articles about the murders she and her friends have committed. She confronts Debbie over it, but Debbie lies and says the scrapbook belongs to Curtis. That night, Debbie murders Beverly with a bow-and-arrow and gets Curtis and Steven to help her move the body away from the house in order to avert suspicion.

After Beverly's funeral, Curtis, Steven, and Debbie attempt to murder Timmy again before Joyce intervenes. Debbie once again blames Curtis and Steven to make herself look innocent. Joyce threatens to call the police, but Curtis says they will dismiss her as crazy due to the incident at the birthday party, so an infuriated Joyce lets them go.

The next day, Debbie asks Joyce to babysit her and Joyce agrees, unaware that it is a trap. After Joyce and Timmy arrive at Debbie's house, she lets in Curtis and Steven through the back door. Curtis and Steven try to kill Joyce and Timmy with the revolver. However, Joyce and Timmy successfully subdue the two boys and are able to call the police, who arrest Curtis and Steven the next morning as Debbie flees with her mother.

Some time later, Debbie and Mrs. Brody have fled to a new town and are staying at a motel, with Debbie now going by the name "Beth". Debbie, who had been playing with a truck jack, promises to be a good girl from now on. They leave together, as the camera pans to reveal a dead mechanic under a truck.

== Cast ==
- Lori Lethin as Joyce Russell
- Melinda Cordell as Mrs. Brody
- Julie Brown as Beverly Brody
- Joe Penny as Mr. Harding
- Bert Kramer as Sheriff James Brody
- K. C. Martel as Timmy Russell
- Elizabeth Hoy as Debbie Brody
- Billy Jacoby as Curtis Taylor
- Andy Freeman as Steven Seton
- Susan Strasberg as Miss Viola Davis
- José Ferrer as Doctor
- Ben Marley as Duke Benson
- Erica Hope as Annie Smith
- Ellen Geer as Madge
- Michael Dudikoff as Willard
- Cyril O'Reilly as Paul
- Sylvia Wright as Girl in Van
- John Avery as Boy in Van

== Release ==
Bloody Birthday was given a belated limited release theatrically in the United States by Rearguard Productions in 1981. It was later released on VHS by Prism Entertainment in 1986 and Starmaker Entertainment in 1990.

The film was officially released on DVD by VCI Home Video in 2003.

It was released on Blu-ray by 88 Films in 2014. Arrow Video also released it on Blu-ray in 2018.

== Critical reception ==
Bloody Birthday received mixed-to-negative reviews from critics, but the performances (particularly those of Billy Jacoby, Andy Freeman, and Elizabeth Hoy) were praised. AllMovie called it "a bloody-fun time that's great for all of the wrong reasons."

On the review aggregator website Rotten Tomatoes, 75% of 8 critics' reviews are positive, with an average rating of 5.3/10. On Metacritic, it has a score of 49, indicating "mixed or average" reviews.

== See also ==
- Slasher film
- List of films featuring eclipses
