= Gerald T. Olson =

American film producer

- Born: United States
- Other name: Gerald Olson
- Education: San Francisco State
- Occupations: Film producer, television producer
- Known for: Dumb & Dumber; House Party

Gerald T. Olson (also credited as Gerald Olson) is an American film and television producer best known for films such as House Party, Bloody Birthday and Dumb & Dumber. The San Francisco State alum relocated to Los Angeles, and eventually became director of production at HBO.

Olson has been involved with several other projects, including Repo Man starring Emilio Estevez, The Hidden starring Kyle MacLachlan, Rapid Fire starring Brandon Lee and Peter Berg's The Rundown starring Dwayne Johnson, Seann William Scott, Christopher Walken and Rosario Dawson.
