= Philip McKeon =

American actor (1964–2019)

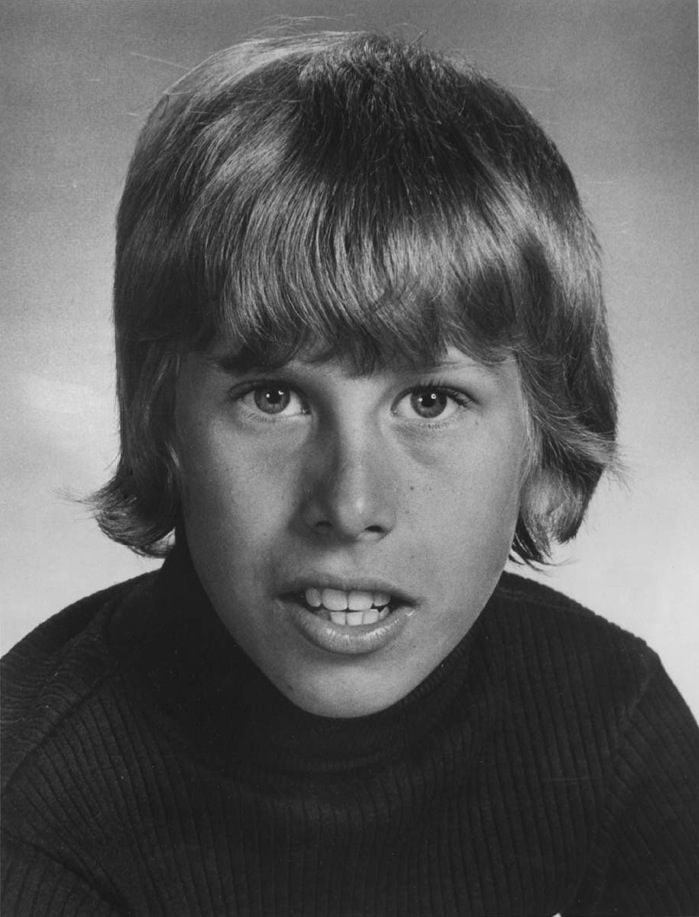
- McKeon (c. 1976)
- Born: Philip Anthony McKeon; November 11, 1964; Westbury, New York, U.S.
- Died: December 10, 2019 (aged 55); Wimberley, Texas, U.S.
- Occupations: Actor; print model; radio personality
- Years active: 1969–2000
- Relatives: Nancy McKeon (sister)

Philip Anthony McKeon (November 11, 1964 – December 10, 2019) was an American child actor and radio personality, best known for his role as Tommy Hyatt, the son of the title character on the television sitcom Alice from 1976 to 1985.

== Early life ==
McKeon was born in Westbury, New York, the son of Barbara and Donald McKeon, a travel agent. His younger sister is actress Nancy McKeon (The Facts of Life). They are not related to actor Doug McKeon.

McKeon's professional career began when he was 4 years old as a print model. His parents took him and Nancy, then age 2, to a nearby modeling audition, and he began his career as a child model, appearing in magazines, newspapers, and television commercials. Over the next several years, he received numerous modeling jobs, followed by several parts on stage and in films. McKeon played baseball with Benoit Benjamin in 1975 in Little League Baseball in Williamsport, Pennsylvania.

== Career ==
McKeon's big break came when Linda Lavin saw him in a Broadway performance of Medea and Jason (1974), thought he was bright and talented, and recommended him for the part of Tommy in Alice. This was the television adaptation of the film Alice Doesn't Live Here Anymore (1974), which was directed by Martin Scorsese and written by Robert Getchell, with an Academy Award–winning performance by Ellen Burstyn in the title role. McKeon replaced child actor Alfred Lutter, who appeared in the pilot after playing Tommy in the Scorsese film opposite Burstyn.

After Alice ended in 1985, McKeon continued to make periodic acting appearances, including Sandman (1993) and Ghoulies IV (1994). He also produced or directed films such as Where the Day Takes You (1992) and Teresa's Tattoo (1994), both of which included his sister Nancy in the cast, as well as Murder in the First (1995), and The Young Unknowns (2000).

After 2000, McKeon worked in radio, first in the news department at KFWB AM 980 in Los Angeles and then as co-host of the morning radio show The Breakfast Taco on KWVH-LP 94.1FM in Wimberley, Texas.

== Personal life and death ==
McKeon died in Texas on December 10, 2019, following a long illness. He was 55 years old.

== Filmography ==
Year	Title	Role	Notes
1976–1985	Alice	Tommy Hyatt	Main cast (108 episodes)
1979	CHiPs	Himself	Episode: "Roller Disco: Part 2"
1982	Insight	Tommy Russell	Episode: "Leadfoot"
1984	Fantasy Island	Raymond Koster	Episode: "Sweet Life/Games People Play"
1984	The Love Boat	Gary Atkins	Episode: " Aunt Emma, I Love You/Hoopla/The First Romance"
1986	Amazing Stories	'Stick'	Episode: "No Day at the Beach"
1987	Return to Horror High	Richard Farley	Feature film
1988	Favorite Son		Television miniseries
1989	Red Surf	'True Blue'	Direct-to-video film
1992	976-EVIL II	Taylor	Feature film
1993	Sandman	Gordie	Feature film
1994	Ghoulies 4	Demon	Direct-to-video film
