= Scenes from the Goldmine =

- Directed by: Marc Rocco
- Written by: Marc Rocco
- Produced by: Marc Rocco
- Starring: Catherine Mary Stewart; Cameron Dye; Steve Railsback; Joe Pantoliano; Alex Rocco; Jewel Shepard
- Release dates: April 1987 (WorldFest); August 8, 1987 (United States)
- Country: United States
- Language: English

Scenes from the Goldmine is a 1987 American film directed, written and produced by Marc Rocco and starring Catherine Mary Stewart.

== Plot ==
A female songwriter is invited to join a rock band. She's thrilled at first to be near the rock band's handsome leader. They embark upon an affair until she discovers he is stealing her songs.

== Cast ==
- Catherine Mary Stewart as Debi DiAngelo
- Cameron Dye as Niles Dresden
- Steve Railsback as Harry Spiros
- Joe Pantoliano as Manny Ricci
- Alex Rocco as Nathan DiAngelo
- Lee Ving as Ian Weymouth
- John Ford Coley as Kenny Bond
- Timothy B. Schmit as Dennis Lameraux
- Jewel Shepard as Dana
- Pamela Springsteen as Stephanie
- James House as Simon LeGree
- Melissa Etheridge as Shop Clerk
- Nick Gilder as Himself
- Lesley-Anne Down as Lady Lesley-Anne Down
