= Out of the Dark (1988 film) =

1989 slasher film

- Home video release poster
- Directed by: Michael Schroeder
- Written by: J. Greg De Felice; Zane W. Levitt
- Produced by: Zane W. Levitt; David C. Thomas; Paul Bartel
- Starring: Karen Witter; Karen Black; Bud Cort; Geoffrey Lewis; Tracey Walter; Divine; Cameron Dye
- Cinematography: Julio Macat
- Edited by: Mark S. Manos
- Music by: Paul Antonelli; David Wheatley
- Distributed by: CineTel Films
- Release date: June 1988
- Running time: 89 min
- Country: United States
- Language: English
- Budget: $1,600,000
- Box office: $419,428 (USA)

Out of the Dark is a 1988 American slasher film starring Karen Witter. The film was publicized as the last acting credit of the drag queen Divine, who died slightly over a year before its release.

== Plot ==
"Suite Nothings" is a sleazy L.A. phone-sex hot-line voiced by women who are trying, and usually failing, to become successful actors or models. Preying on them is Bobo, a psychotic killer who dresses in a clown costume. The police believe the killer to be Kevin, a photographer who is dating one of the operators, Kristi. As the murders pile up Kristi and Kevin start their own quest to find the killer, as one of the investigators, Lt. Meyers, refuses to believe that anyone else is the murderer.

Their investigations cause them to suspect an accountant in the same building, Stringer, but also places them at a sleazy motel at the same time Bobo murders a prostitute. Kevin is detained for the murder, as he made Kristi flee with him from the scene, and he uses his one phone call to instruct Kristi to search Stringer's office for evidence. The search is fruitful, but Kristi is discovered by Stringer. The two fight and Stringer chases Kristi out of the building, where he is run over by a passing motorist. The evidence in Stringer's office clears Kevin of the crimes, much to the frustration of Meyers, who still believes him to be the killer.

Kristi and a now-free Kevin then travel to a remote cabin, where she quickly discovers that Kevin was the true killer all along. When he tries to attack her Kristi shoots Kevin with a gun they had been carrying for safety. Believing him to be dead she turns her back on him, only for him to rise up and attack her. Before he can kill her, Lt. Meyers arrives and shoots Kevin dead with a shotgun.

== Cast ==
- Karen Black as Ruth Wilson
- Bud Cort as David Stringer
- Geoffrey Lewis as Dennis
- Tracey Walter as Lt. Frank Meyers
- Lynn Danielson-Rosenthal as Kristi
- Divine as Det. Langella
- Cameron Dye as Kevin Silvers
- Lainie Kazan as Hooker Nancy
- Karen Witter as Jo Ann
- Karen Mayo-Chandler as Barbara
- Tab Hunter as Driver
- Paul Bartel as Hotel Clerk
- Silvana Gallardo as McDonald

== Production ==
The screenplay was written by J. Greg De Felice and Zane W. Levitt, the latter of whom had worked as an assistant to producer Paul Bartel, and inspired by the then prolific 976 Premium-rate telephone number and had the original title of 976-KILL. The title was changed to avoid confusion with another 976 film CineTel Films had produced titled 976-EVIL. Levitt and De Felice were inspired by the works of Brian De Palma in making the film a lurid sexually tinged murder mystery. Filming took place in north Hollywood and Los Angeles, California during late 1987.

The film was advertised as the final acting role of Divine, who had a cameo role in the movie as a detective.

== Release ==
Years of release for Out of the Dark differ. Some books list the film's release as 1989, as Out of the Dark had a theatrical release in the United States during May 1989. That same year it also released on VHS and Laserdisc in 1989 by RCA/Columbia Pictures home video. Other sources list the year of release as 1988, as the film had a release in the United Kingdom.

Sony Pictures released the film on a manufactured-on-demand DVD-R of the film on March 1, 2011. In 2017 Mill Creek Entertainment re-released Out of the Dark on DVD as part of a their Shadow Stalkers box set.

== Reception ==
Critical reception for the film has been negative. Common criticism centered upon its pacing, predictability, and tone. Stephen Holden from the New York Times gave the film a negative review, calling it "misogynistic" and criticized its inconsistent tone. Time Out called it "A straight re-run of those '70s slasher pics", and criticized the film for the obvious identity of the killer. TV Guide awarded the film one out of four stars, stating that the only real selling point was the "eccentric array of supporting players".

A reviewer for Hysteria Lives! rated the film at two and a half out of five stars, stating that it was "very hit and miss" and that they were disappointed with the cameo appearances of Divine and Tab Hunter. Kurt Dahlke of DVD Talk noted that while the film was a guilty pleasure, that the movie's predictability and its odd tone and performances made it feel "more like a Showtime Red Shoe Diaries misfire than a feature film".
