= Comfort and Joy (2003 film) =

2003 American made-for-television film

- Genre: Romance; Comedy; Drama
- Written by: Judd Parkin
- Directed by: Maggie Greenwald
- Starring: Nancy McKeon; Steven Eckholdt; Paul Dooley; Andrew Chalmers; Dixie Carter; Jordy Benattar; Maria Herrera
- Music by: David Mansfield
- Country of origin: United States
- Original language: English

Production
- Producer: Cathy Mickel Gibson
- Cinematography: Checco Varese
- Editor: Keith Reamer
- Running time: 89 minutes
- Production companies: Lifetime Television; Paramount Television

Original release
- Network: Lifetime
- Release: December 1, 2003

Comfort and Joy is a 2003 American made-for-television romantic drama film directed by Maggie Greenwald and starring Nancy McKeon as Jane Berry. The film originally aired on the Lifetime cable network on December 1, 2003.

== Plot ==
Jane Berry is a successful, single entrepreneur who is vice president of ad agency, has a luxury apartment, and drives a Jaguar.

On Christmas, when she is driving to a company party, she gets lost and hits a pole. Sam (Steven Eckholdt) comes to her rescue to get her out of her car (which is now a station wagon) and tells her that he has been her husband for the past 10 years and she has two children with him. Jane realizes that she is in an alternate reality. Ten years ago, she dumped her boyfriend and left her job for Sam. Jane is confused by her new world, where she is a new Jane who is completely different from the old one.

Slowly, Jane acclimates her new life. After an argument with her parents at Christmas dinner, she is completely impressed by Sam and her family. She kisses Sam but finds herself back the Jaguar after the accident. Sam comes to her rescue, but he doesn't know who she is. She tells Sam that she knows him and is in love with him, which Sam is shocked to hear. They move together to Sam's house to lead a happy life in the future.

== Cast ==
- Nancy McKeon as Jane Berry
- Steven Eckholdt as Sam
- Paul Dooley as George
- Andrew Chalmers as Troy Keller
- Jordy Benattar as Heather Keller
- Maria Herrera as Alison Phillips
- Dixie Carter as Frederica

== See also ==
- List of Christmas films
