= Where the Day Takes You =

1992 American film by Marc Rocco

- Theatrical release poster
- Directed by: Marc Rocco
- Written by: Marc Rocco; Michael Hitchcock; Kurt Voss
- Produced by: Paul Hertzberg; Philip McKeon
- Starring: Sean Astin; Lara Flynn Boyle; Peter Dobson; Balthazar Getty; Ricki Lake; James LeGros; Dermot Mulroney; Adam Baldwin; Nancy McKeon; Alyssa Milano; Will Smith; Rachel Ticotin; Stephen Tobolowsky
- Cinematography: King Baggot
- Edited by: Russell Livingstone
- Music by: Mark Morgan
- Production company: CineTel Films
- Distributed by: New Line Cinema
- Release date: September 11, 1992
- Running time: 105 minutes
- Country: United States
- Language: English
- Budget: $3 million
- Box office: $390,152

Where the Day Takes You is a 1992 American drama film directed by Marc Rocco. The film stars Sean Astin, Lara Flynn Boyle, Peter Dobson, Balthazar Getty, Ricki Lake, James LeGros, Dermot Mulroney, and Will Smith in his film debut. Its plot follows a group of teenage runaways trying to survive on the streets of Los Angeles. The film was released on September 11, 1992.

== Plot ==
Fleeing various hardships, a group of young people form a protective family of their own on the streets of Los Angeles, led by King. In his early twenties, King has lived on the street for several years. After being released after two months in prison for assault, he feels the group (him, Greg, Little J, Crasher, and Brenda) fell apart in his absence. He is introduced to Heather, a 17-year-old from Chicago, whom he includes in his revenge on Tommy Ray, who killed his girlfriend, Devon.

One night, Greg and Little J get into a fight while stealing car stereos. Greg, mad the group always sides with Little J, seeks refuge with his drug dealer, Ted, and Ted's girlfriend, Vikki. He is rejected, however, due to not having any money. Going home to look for money, his father and stepmother have him arrested for grand theft.

Meanwhile, King and Heather have trouble earning money, but he won't turn to prostitution, unlike Little J's friends Rob and Kimmy. Rob entices Little J, but while servicing his client Charles, Little J recalls the childhood sexual abuse from his uncle. In jail, Greg admits to drug addiction, so a social worker gets him into a rehabilitation center and he is paroled.

Meanwhile, Tommy Ray, after threatening and assaulting King's legless friend Manny, finds out where King is living. Tommy Ray beats up King and nearly stabs him to death until Little J kills him. King, Heather, and Little J escape, but Crasher is arrested. King advises Heather to return to Chicago, but she refuses to go without him.

After a day spent begging for money, they decide to go to a hotel and spend the night making love. She admits she fled home because her brother raped her. Little J, meanwhile, temporarily takes refuge at Rob's and Kimmy's, but he is eventually kicked out by Rob and decides to contact Charles again. Greg flees from the rehabilitation center in the meantime, but unable to find the group, he goes to Ted, who is worried about him because he hasn't slept for four days and tries to 'help' him by shooting him up with heroin.

Once out of jail, Crasher tries to convince King and Heather to go with him to Dallas, as the police are looking for them. King doesn't want to leave without Greg and Little J, and starts looking for them. He is shocked to find Greg lying in his own vomit, high on drugs at Ted's place. Greg promises to go with him, but he is arrested by the police before he can.

They next find Little J under a bridge, having been kicked out of Charles' house and regretting having shot Tommy Ray. The three decide to leave without anyone else. Meanwhile, Greg, out of jail after informing the police about King's whereabouts, returns to Ted, overdosing to death. On their bus, King decides to get out to look for Greg, but he is held at gunpoint by the police. Little J tries to save him and attempts to shoot them, causing them to shoot back. King, however, jumps in front of him and is shot and killed, shocking a witnessing Heather. She decides to stay in the city and wait for Little J's release from jail. Accompanied by Brenda, she returns to the streets, doing as King taught her.

== Cast ==
- Sean Astin as Greg, a runaway who is addicted to several drugs, primarily speed and heroin.
- Lara Flynn Boyle as Heather, a 17-year-old who just ran away from home. She becomes the romantic interest of King.
- Peter Dobson as Tommy Ray, the violent enemy of King.
- Balthazar Getty as 'Little J', an aggressive boy who doesn't care about rules.
- Ricki Lake as Brenda, an overweight girl who wants to be a movie star.
- James LeGros as 'Crasher', who wants to move to Dallas.
- Kyle MacLachlan as Ted, Greg's drug dealer, who thinks of him as his little brother.
- Dermot Mulroney as 'King', the leader of a group of street people. Although most of his friends are addicted to drugs, King stays clean.
- Adam Baldwin as Officer Black, a policeman looking for King.
- Alyssa Milano as Kimmy, a prostitute.
- Leo Rossi as Mr. Burtis, Greg's father.
- Will Smith as Manny, a legless man who is friends with King's group.
- Rachel Ticotin as Officer Landers, a policewoman looking for King.
- Stephen Tobolowsky as Charles, a rich man who hires Little J as a prostitute.
- Laura San Giacomo as The Interviewer, questioning King in prison about his life.
- Nancy McKeon as Vikki, Ted's girlfriend.
- David Arquette as Rob, Kimmy's boyfriend, also a prostitute.
- Robert Knepper as a Rock Singer.
- Christian Slater (Uncredited) as a social worker who tries to help Greg to stay clean.

== Production ==
The film's director, Marc Rocco was attracted to the production when he read the script from Michael Hitchcock. Hitchcock was inspired to write the script due to his experience on working at a shelter for teenage runaways in Hollywood.

Despite the low budget, the film features an ensemble cast. Most cast members worked, against the advice of their agents, for a small salary. They prepared for their role by spending days with actual teenage runaways in the Hollywood district. Rocco explained their enthusiasm to work on the project in a 1992 interview: "So few scripts let these actors actually act, so few studios give these actors anything but light comedies, there are so few chances to let these actors create dimensional people." Shooting of the film concluded in August 1991. The shooting has involved locations all over Hollywood, and meant the closing of the boulevard on some nights. People who passed by were paid $40 to appear as extras in the film.

Supporting cast member Alyssa Milano initially auditioned for the role of Heather, but fear of casting a former child actress initiated the producers to find her a smaller role instead. The role of Heather eventually went to Lara Flynn Boyle. On why she accepted the role, Boyle commented in a 1991 interview that the script smacked her with reality: "One day when I was thinking about doing the movie, I passed Hollywood and Highland Avenue, and looked over and saw 30 kids hanging out. I thought of the movie and that sight made me eager to do it."

== Reception ==
The film received generally positive reviews but was a box-office disappointment, earning $190,961 at 93 theaters during its opening weekend. Roger Ebert of the Chicago Sun-Times wrote in his 1992 review: "The movie is effective, well-acted and convincing. [..] Mulroney carries the movie. [..] Many of the other characters are sharply drawn, including Greg, played by Astin. [..] Getty is very effective in a scene where he tries to be a male prostitute but hates himself for it. And Boyle is good in the somewhat stereotyped role of the pretty newcomer to the group. [..] It is not a poetic or pseudo-romantic view of runaway life (which seems like a hell interrupted by occasional laughs), but on the other hand it isn't hysterical, either. [..] The story is convincing up until the end, which feels manufactured for movie purposes."

On the review aggregator website Rotten Tomatoes, 80% of 5 critics' reviews are positive. Metacritic, which uses a weighted average, assigned the film a score of 64 out of 100, based on 14 critics, indicating "generally favorable" reviews.

== Home media ==
In 2003, the film was released in a full-frame edition DVD by Columbia TriStar Home Video, with this release reaching Australia in 2005. In October 2009, Anchor Bay released a widescreen edition DVD. In 2019, Sony released a widescreen Blu-ray release.
