= Alex Rocco =

American actor (1936–2015)

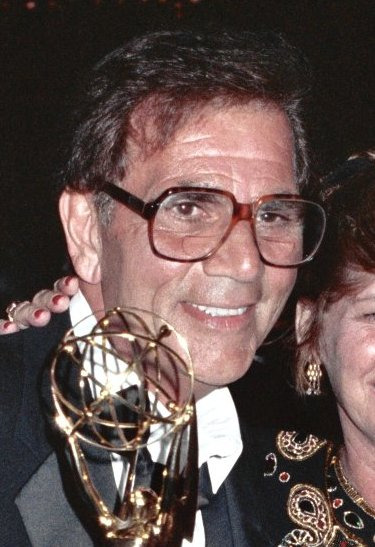
- Rocco in 1990
- Born: Alessandro Federico Petricone Jr. February 29, 1936; Cambridge, Massachusetts, U.S.
- Died: July 18, 2015 (aged 79); Studio City, California, U.S.
- Other name: Alexander F. Petricone
- Occupation: Actor
- Years active: 1965–2015
- Spouses: Grace Petricone; (m. 19??; div. 19??); Sandra Elaine Garrett (m. 1964; died 2002) Shannon Wilcox (m. 2005)
- Children: 4

Alex Rocco (born Alessandro Federico Petricone Jr.; February 29, 1936 – July 18, 2015) was an American actor. Known for his distinctive, gravelly voice, he was often cast as villains, including Moe Greene in The Godfather (1972) and his Primetime Emmy Award–winning role in The Famous Teddy Z. Rocco did a significant amount of voice-over work later in his career.

== Early life ==
Rocco was born as Alessandro Federico Petricone Jr., in Cambridge, Massachusetts, in 1936, and raised in nearby Somerville, the son of an Italian immigrant, Mary (née DiBiase; 1909–1978) and Alessandro Sam Petricone (1896–1949), a native of Gaeta, Italy. Rocco served in the National Guard during the Korean War.

== Criminal activity and arrests ==
In January 1960, Rocco—then known as Alexander F. Petricone—was one of 28 persons indicted by a Middlesex County grand jury in a gambling case, and in September 1961, he was arrested along with James McLean and others on charges related to an assault on the owner of a diner in Somerville, and the wrecking of his establishment, the previous August.

According to organized crime turncoat Vincent Teresa, Petricone was a hanger-on with the Winter Hill Gang of the Boston area. An unwanted advance toward Petricone's girlfriend on Labor Day 1961, touched off the Boston Irish Gang War of the 1960s. Georgie McLaughlin, who made the advance, was beaten by Winter Hill Gang members.

Petricone was arrested in Charlestown on October 31, 1961, along with McLean on suspicion of murder following the death of Bernie McLaughlin of the Charlestown Mob, the first murder of the war. He was working as a bartender.

A witness claimed that Petricone was the driver of the getaway car, and he and McLean were formally charged in the slaying on November 1, 1961. Petricone and McLean were released after a grand jury found a lack of evidence, but both served a prison term for the diner wrecking. In 1962, while Petricone was in prison, his wife's car was bombed. Police believed the bomb was intended for Howie Winter, head of the Winter Hill Gang, who had driven the car to her earlier.

== Acting career ==
After completing his prison term for the diner assault, Petricone and his wife divorced and he moved to California. He later recounted, "I had to get out of Boston, so I flipped a coin and said 'Heads, Miami, tails, California'." He began taking acting lessons from actor Leonard Nimoy, a fellow Boston native. Nimoy worked with him to eliminate his heavy Boston accent and had him take speech lessons. Rocco followed through with Nimoy's instructions, and started working in the film industry, adopting the name "Alex Rocco" after seeing "Rocco" on a bakery truck.

His first film role was in Russ Meyer's Motorpsycho! in 1965.

In 1972, Rocco played the part of Moe Greene, a Las Vegas casino owner, in Coppola's The Godfather. Greene's character represented the top Jewish mobster in Las Vegas; although he sought an Italian role, director Francis Ford Coppola remarked "I got my Jew!" on seeing Rocco. The same year, Rocco returned to the Boston area to play a bank robber in the film The Friends of Eddie Coyle. He set up a meeting between Robert Mitchum and local Irish-American gangsters to help Mitchum research his part as Eddie Coyle, a low-level Irish-American criminal. Rocco introduced Mitchum to Howie Winter, leader of the Winter Hill Gang. Another Winter Hill Gang member who met with Mitchum was Johnny Martorano, who had murdered Billy O'Brien, a low-level gangster.

In the fall of 1975, Rocco starred as Pete Karras in Three for the Road. In the long-running, 1980s TV series The Facts of Life, Rocco had a recurring role as Charlie Polniaczek, Jo's father. In 1989, he played Gus Keller in the Corey Feldman and Corey Haim movie Dream a Little Dream. In the period 1989–90, Rocco was a regular on the television comedy series The Famous Teddy Z as Al Floss, a Hollywood talent agent. He received an Emmy Award as Best Supporting Actor in a Comedy Series for this role in 1990. In 1995, Rocco appeared as Jimmy Capp, a Miami mob boss, in the John Travolta mob comedy, Get Shorty. In 1997, he appeared, along with Rodney Dangerfield and others, in the annual Thanksgiving episode of the ABC sitcom Home Improvement.

In the 1996 film That Thing You Do!, Rocco had a cameo part as Sol Siler, the founder of Playtone Records, a performance that was rated by The Observer's critic as his "favorite [part] in the movie." Rocco appeared as Salvatore in the 2001 film The Wedding Planner, and (uncredited) in the action thriller Smokin' Aces.

Rocco had a recurring voiceover part in the long-running animated series The Simpsons as the head of Itchy and Scratchy Studios, Roger Meyers Jr. In the DVD commentaries, Rocco expressed true gratitude to The Simpsons' staff for allowing him his first voiceover role. He did further voice work on two early episodes of the Fox hit sitcom, Family Guy and on the 1998 Disney/Pixar film A Bug's Life. He deemed the latter to have been his "greatest prize in life," since he was paid $1 million to record eight lines.

In 2008, Rocco starred in the Super Bowl commercial for the Audi R8 supercar. The commercial was inspired by The Godfather. He played a rich man who finds the front fascia of his luxury car in his bed, a nod to the scene from the original movie in which Jack Woltz, a rich movie producer, finds the head of his prized racehorse in his bed. He was also featured on the Starz cable channel's crime-drama series, Magic City. His last role was in the 2010s BBC2 TV series Episodes, playing the "curmudgeonly" father of Matt LeBlanc's character.

== Personal life ==
His first marriage was to Grace Petricone, and they had one daughter.

After moving to Los Angeles, Rocco became a member of the Baháʼí Faith, and he appeared in a number of productions related to the religion over the years. He also thanked Baháʼu'lláh, founder of the Baháʼí Faith, in his Emmy Award acceptance speech.

After moving to California, he married Sandra Elaine in 1964. He adopted her son, Marc King, who became known as Marc Rocco.

Rocco married Shannon Wilcox, on October 15, 2005.

== Death ==
Alex Rocco died on July 18, 2015, from pancreatic cancer in his Studio City home, at the age of 79.

== Filmography ==
=== Film ===
Year	Title	Role	Notes
1965	Motorpsycho	Cory Maddox	
1967	The St. Valentine's Day Massacre	Diamond	
1968	The Boston Strangler	Detective at Apartment of Victim #10	Uncredited
1970	Blood Mania	Lawyer	
1971	Wild Riders	Stick	
1971	Brute Corps	Wicks	
1972	The Godfather	Moe Greene	
1972	Stanley	Richard Thomkins	
1973	Bonnie's Kids	Eddy	
1973	The Outside Man	Miller	
1973	Slither	Man with Ice Cream	
1973	The Friends of Eddie Coyle	Jimmy Scalise	
1973	Detroit 9000	Lieutenant Danny Bassett	
1974	Three the Hard Way	Lt. Di Nisco	
1974	Freebie and the Bean	D.A.	
1975	Rafferty and the Gold Dust Twins	Vinnie	
1975	A Woman for All Men	Lt. Robert Di Biase	
1975	Hearts of the West	Earl	
1977	Fire Sale	Al	
1978	Rabbit Test	Sergeant Danny Bonhoff	
1979	Voices	Frank Rothman	
1980	Herbie Goes Bananas	Quinn	
1980	The Stunt Man	Police Chief Jake	
1981	Nobody's Perfekt	The Boss	
1982	The Entity	Jerry Anderson	
1984	Cannonball Run II	Tony	
1985	Stick	Firestone	
1985	Gotcha!	Al	
1985	Stiffs	Pasquale	
1987	P.K. and the Kid	Les	
1987	Return to Horror High	Harry Sleerik	
1987	Scenes from the Goldmine	Nathan DiAngelo	
1988	Lady in White	Angelo "Al" Scarlatti	
1989	Dream a Little Dream	Gus Keller	
1989	Wired	Arnie Fromson	
1990	How to Murder a Millionaire	Walter Newman	
1991	The Pope Must Die	Cardinal Rocco	
1992	Boris and Natasha: The Movie	Sheldon Kaufman	
1995	The Flight of the Dove	Bartender	
1995	Get Shorty	Jimmy Cap	Uncredited
1996	That Thing You Do!	Sol Siler	
1996	Dead of Night	Bukowski	
1997	Just Write	Mr. McMurphy	
1998	Goodbye Lover	Detective Crowley	
1998	A Bug's Life	Thorny	Voice
1999	Dudley Do-Right	Kumquat Chief	
2000	The Last Producer	Poker Player #6	
2001	The Wedding Planner	Salvatore Fiore	
2001	Face to Face	Phil	
2002	The Country Bears	Rip Holland	
2003	The Job	Vernon Cray	
2005	Crazylove	Uncle Cort	
2006	Find Me Guilty	Nick Calabrese	
2006	Jam	Mick	
2006	Smokin' Aces	Serna	
2009	Ready or Not	Don Julio	
2010	Now Here	Mr. Martin	
2011	Batman: Year One	Carmine Falcone	Voice
2011	And They're Off	Saul Youngerman	
2013	The House Across the Street	Mr. Barnes	
2014	Scammerhead	Ben Sarnus	
2016	Silver Skies	Frank	Posthumous release
2017	Don't Sleep	Mr. Marino	Posthumous release; Final film role

=== Television ===
Year	Title	Role	Notes
1967	Batman	Block	Episodes: "A Piece of Action" and "Batman's Satisfaction"
1970	That Girl	Biff	1 episode
1971	Mission: Impossible	Tanner	Episode: "Blues"
1972	The F.B.I.	Matt Wilnor	1 episode
1972	Cannon	Hit Man	Episode: "Hear No Evil"
1973	Cannon	Walter Koether	Episode: "Target in the Mirror"
1973	Kojak	Tony Crucio	Episode: "Knockover"
1973	Circle of Fear	Joseph Moretti	1 episode
1974	The Rookies	Earl Fisher	1 episode
1975	Hustling	Swifty	TV film
1975	Cannon	Paul	Episode: "Search and Destroy"
1975	Three for the Road	Pete Karras	14 episodes
1977	Police Story	Investigator Phil Logan	Episode: "Nightmare on a Sunday Morning"
1977	Barnaby Jones	Harry Stroop	1 episode
1977	The Rockford Files	Sherman Royle	2 episodes
1977	Starsky & Hutch	Thomas Callendar	2 episodes
1977	The Mary Tyler Moore Show	Ben Selwyn	Episode: Lou's Army Reunion
1978	The Grass Is Always Greener Over the Septic Tank	Ralph Corliss	Television film
1981–1988	The Facts of Life	Charlie Polniaczek	11 episodes
1980	CHiPs	Ansgar	Episodes: "The Great 5K Star Race and Boulder Wrap Party": Part 1 and Part 2
1982	The First Time	Jay	Television film
1983	The Best of Times	Gene Falcone	Television pilot
1984	St. Elsewhere	Roger	Episode: "Breathless"
1984	Steambath	Tom Devon	Episode: "Madison Avenue Madness"
1985	Murder, She Wrote	Ernie Santini	Episode: "Tough Guys Don't Die"
1985	The Golden Girls	Glen O'Brien	Episode: "That Was No Lady"
1985	The A-Team	Sonny Monroe	Episode: "Champ!"
1985	Badge of the Assassin	Detective Bill Butler NYPD	Television film
1986	Murder, She Wrote	Bert Yardley	Episode: "Christopher Bundy – Died on Sunday"
1987	Rags to Riches	Michael Rapp	1 episode
1987	Hotel	Phil Johnson	Episode: "Desperate Moves"
1987	Hunter	Floyd Benson	Episode: "Hot Prowl"
1989	Murphy Brown	Al Floss	1 episode
1989–1990	The Famous Teddy Z	Al Floss	Primetime Emmy Award for Outstanding Supporting Actor – Comedy Series
1990–1997	The Simpsons	Roger Meyers Jr.	Voice; 3 episodes
1991–1992	Sibs	Howie Ruscio	23 episodes
1993	Love, Honor & Obey: The Last Mafia Marriage	Uncle Frank	TV movie
1994	The George Carlin Show	Harry Rossetti	11 episodes
1995	Can't Hurry Love	Michael O'Donnell	Episode: "Daddy's Girl"
1996	Pinky and the Brain	Floyd Nesbit	Voice; Episode: "Fly"
1996	Mad About You	Mark Slotkin	Episode: "Outbreak"
1997	Early Edition	Barney Kadison	Episode: "Home"
1997	Home Improvement	Irv Schmayman	Episode: "Thanksgiving"
1998	Michael Hayes	Bernero	1 episode
1999	Family Law	Goodman	1 episode
1999	Family Guy	Soccer Mom	Voice; Episode: "Mind Over Murder"
1999	Sabrina the Teenage Witch	TV Executive	Episode: "Sabrina's Real World"
1999	Just Shoot Me!	Charlie Gold	Episode: "Shaking Private Trainer"
2000	Walker, Texas Ranger	Johnny "Giovanni Rossini" Rose	Episode: "Wedding Bells"
2001	Family Guy	Bea Arthur	Voice; Episode: "Ready, Willing and Disabled"
2001–2004	The Division	John Exstead Sr.	14 episodes
2005	ER	Martin Trudeau	Episode: "Two Ships"
2007	The Wedding Bells	Larry Herschfield	Episode: "The Fantasy"
2010	Party Down	Howard Greengold	Episode: "Constance Carmel Wedding"
2012	Magic City	Arthur Evans	4 episodes
2012	Private Practice	Ed	Episode: "Aftershock"
2014–2015	Episodes	Dick LeBlanc	2 episodes
2015	Maron	David Rosen	Episode: "Stroke of Luck"
