= Lori Lethin =

American actress (born 1955)

- Born: Lori Ann Lethin; August 4, 1955 (age 71); Los Angeles, California, U.S.
- Occupation: Actress
- Years active: 1979–1999
- Spouse: Loring Pickering (m. 1981–1984)

Lori Ann Lethin (born August 4, 1955) is an American retired actress, known for her appearances on television and in several horror films in the 1980s.

== Career ==
She made her feature debut in the slasher film The Prey, filmed around 1980 but released in 1983. She subsequently had a lead role in Bloody Birthday (1981) opposite Susan Strasberg, about a group of children who begin committing murders.

Lethin starred as Charlene Matlock in the 1986 Matlock pilot film, Diary of a Perfect Murder. She was replaced by Linda Purl in the subsequent series. She later starred in the comedy horror film Return to Horror High (1987), playing multiple roles. Lethin had a minor role in Jonathan Kaplan's 1999 drama Brokedown Palace, playing the mother of Kate Beckinsale's character.

== Personal life ==
On July 19, 1981, Lethin married actor Loring Pickering in Catalina Island. She later married Manhattan Transfer leader Tim Hauser; their son Basie was born in 1989.

== Filmography ==
=== Film ===
Year	Title	Role	Notes	Ref.
1981	Bloody Birthday	Joyce Russell		
1981	Goliath Awaits	Maria	Television film	
1983	The Prey	Bobbie	Filmed in 1979-80	
1983	The Day After	Denise Dahlberg	Television film	
1984	For Love or Money	Betty	Television film	
1985	Brotherly Love	Tina	Television film	
1985	Means and Ends	Kelly		
1987	Return to Horror High	Callie Cassidy / Sarah Walker / Susan		
1989	The Magic Boy's Easter	Mother	Short film	
1989	A Platinum Triangle	Karen Masters		
1999	Brokedown Palace	Lori Davis		

=== Television ===
Year	Title	Role	Notes	Ref.
1979	Charlie's Angels	Bo Fleming	Episode: "Teen Angels"	
1979	A Man Called Sloane	Helen	Episode: "Architect of Evil"	
1979	Barnaby Jones	Susan Cooper	Episode: "The Final Victim"	
1980	The Dukes of Hazzard	Lori	Episode: "Southern Comforts"	
1980	Freebie and the Bean	Alice	Episode: "The Seduction of Bean"	
1981	Palmerstown, U.S.A.	Carrie Simms	Episode: "Vendetta"	
1981	The Wave		ABC Afterschool Special	
1981	The Wonderful World of Phillip Malley	Meredith Carswell	Pilot	
1982	Hill Street Blues	Diane Koslow	Episode: "Rein of Terror"	
1983	Magnum, P.I.	Gail Blassingame	Episode: "The Big Blow"	
1983	The Mississippi	Mary Penn	Episode: "G.I. Blues"	
1984	The Master	Jill Pattersen	Episode: "Out-of-Time-Step"	
1984	The A-Team	Jennifer Teasdale	Episode: "Harder Than It Looks"	
1984	E/R	Tina	Episode: "Sentimental Journey"	
1985	Diff'rent Strokes	Karen Kimball	Episode: "A Special Friend"	
1985	The Insiders	Billie	Episode: "Gun Runners"	
1986	Matlock	Charlene Matlock	Episode: "Diary of a Perfect Murder"	
1986	Murder, She Wrote	Christy Olson	Episode: "If a Body Meet a Body"	
1986	Stingray	Lanie Harmon	Episode: "Abnormal Psych"	
1986	Throb	Roberta	Episode: "The Party"	
1987	Starman	Joanna 'Dusty' Haley	Episode: "Dusty"	
1987	Werewolf	Julie	Episode: "Eye of the Storm"	
1987	Ohara	Paula Goode	Episode: "And a Child Shall Lead Them"	
