= Santa Who? =

2000 American television film by William Dear

- Region 2 DVD Cover
- Written by: Debra Frank; Steve L. Hayes
- Directed by: William Dear
- Starring: Leslie Nielsen; Steven Eckholdt; Robyn Lively; Max Morrow; Tommy Davidson
- Music by: Joel McNeely
- Country of origin: United States
- Original language: English

Production
- Producer: Frank Siracusa
- Cinematography: Derick V. Underschultz
- Editor: Edgar Burcksen
- Running time: 88 minutes
- Production companies: Gleneagle Productions; Hearst Entertainment

Original release
- Network: ABC
- Release: November 19, 2000

Santa Who? is a 2000 American made-for-television fantasy-comedy film starring Leslie Nielsen and directed by William Dear, in which Santa Claus develops a case of amnesia right before Christmas. It aired as part of The Wonderful World of Disney.

== Plot ==
Santa feels unwell and goes out for fresh air whilst on a flight in his sleigh. Because of bad weather, he falls out and lands in Los Angeles and is unable to remember who he is. A TV news reporter called Peter, finds him and uses him to increase his ratings, asking his audience to find the family of, who he assumes to be, the lost old man.

Santa gets a job working in a mall and Peter's girlfriend's son, repeatedly tries to convince the adults that he is the real Santa Claus, which no one believes.

Santa still remembers certain details about Christmas but is unable to recollect how he knows them, as typically happens with source amnesia. Meanwhile, Santa's elves are looking for him, but a couple have seen him on TV and think it could be their missing grandfather and claim him. Santa begins to realise who he truly is though and Peter gains salvation when he acknowledges that Santa is genuine.

== Cast ==
Actor	Role
Leslie Nielsen	Santa Claus
Steven Eckholdt	Peter Albright
Robyn Lively	Claire Dreyer, Peter's Girlfriend
Max Morrow	Zack Dreyer, Claire's Son
Tommy Davidson	Max the Elf
Aron Tager	Grandpa
Darren Frost	Rupert the Elf
Karen LeBlanc	Lenny the Camera Person
R.D. Reid	Grady
Ted Atherton	George, Ch. 12 Manager
Stewart Arnott	Lusby, Claire's Boss
Carol Lempert	Ellen, Claire's Secretary
Roger Clown	Ray Engles
Elizabeth Brown	Nancy Engles
Laura DeCarteret	Sister Greta
Richard Fitzpatrick	Detective Lohenry

== Reception ==
Christopher Null of Filmcritic.com gave Santa Who? 2 out of 5 stars. Perry Seibert of AllMovie gave the film 3 stars out of 5.

Laura Fries of Variety wrote "Santa Who?, an original Wonderful World of Disney film, does its best to imitate the great holiday classics, but in the end it's about as rewarding as a lump of coal in your stocking". Aliya Whiteley of Den of Geek gave it a mixed review.

== Announced remake ==
In July 2021, Lionsgate, which holds rights to this film as the owner of the Hearst Entertainment library, told Deadline that it planned to remake it, alongside The Babysitter's Seduction, Sex, Lies, & Obsession, Blue Valley Songbird, Sex & Mrs. X, A Different Kind of Christmas, and other Hearst titles with MarVista Entertainment, which will work with Lionsgate in distributing these films. Neither studio released details about these remakes, which they plan to release to an undetermined streaming service.

== See also ==
- List of television films produced for American Broadcasting Company
- List of Christmas films
- Santa Claus in film
