= Grapevine (TV series) =

TV series

- Created by: David Frankel
- Starring: Jonathan Penner; Lynn Clark; Steven Eckholdt
- Composer: Michael Lang
- Country of origin: United States
- Original language: English
- No. of seasons: 1
- No. of episodes: 6

Production
- Executive producer: David Frankel
- Running time: 30 minutes
- Production companies: Corkscrew Productions; MGM/UA Television; CBS Entertainment Productions

Original release
- Network: CBS
- Release: June 15 – July 27, 1992

Grapevine is an American sitcom created by David Frankel, premiered as a six-episode summer series on CBS from June 15 to July 27, 1992. It was not renewed.

A revival of the series, with a different cast, premiered on CBS in February 2000, lasting five episodes.

== 1992 version ==
=== Summary ===
David owned a restaurant in Miami Beach on Ocean Drive. His girlfriend Susan worked for a cruise line. His brother Thumper was a sportscaster. The series was a 1990s take on Love, American Style in its couple-of-the-week format. Each episode presented the story of a couple, as told through short scenes interwoven with the regular characters, the couple, friends, associates talking to the camera about the couple as if speaking to an unseen interviewer. Editing allowed for jokes to be set up by one "interview" with the punch line delivered by another character, sometimes completely unrelated. Example: A husband who had sex with his estranged wife's sister says to the camera, "What we did wasn't a crime?" Quick cut to "People have been shot for less," in a medium Hispanic accent from a middle-aged City of Miami police officer first heard from earlier in the episode discussing a bizarre jewelry heist that ended with the female thief shot dead. The background music ranged from quiet jazz piano to, for outdoor scenes of relaxation and imbibing, a wailing saxophone.

Stories were contained within a half-hour. Sometimes the couples stayed together, and other times they broke up.

Realism was heightened by the show making full use of actually being shot in Miami, instead of the common practice of shooting establishing shots in a locale then shooting the rest in Los Angeles. All of David's interviews and the scenes in his restaurant used Ocean Drive's Cafe Milano as it was at the time, without set dressing (at the start of The Billy and Lisa Story episode, the green awning with the Cafe Milano name is visible and legible for several seconds). Thumper, allegedly based on creator David Frankel's brother John Frankel, then working in Miami television for the ABC affiliate, worked for the CBS affiliate and some of his interviews used the affiliate's studios. The Katie and Adam Story involved two of Thumper's employees having an affair, so the station's actual trucks, offices and news sets were used (when the philandering pair leaves one set, the camera follows them until it lingers on the background for a popular consumer news segment called "Shame on You.") Susan's interviews usually put her in her office with a view of Biscayne Bay or the MacArthur Causeway behind her. Other characters were shot in front of notable Miami buildings or South Florida-style establishments.

The series aired for six episodes as a summer replacement series and enjoyed popularity among critics and many viewers in their 20s, especially in Miami. The show logged several notable guest stars, such as a young Mariska Hargitay (appearing as Katie in the episode, "The Katie and Adam Story"). CBS, with what was famously and infamously the oldest audience on television, opted not to pick up the show. Fox Network was rumored to be interested. Years later, when CBS revived the show, creator David Frankel told the Fort Lauderdale Sun-Sentinel that Fox asked him to create the same show but with a different title.

== Cast ==
=== Main ===
- Jonathan Penner as David Klein
- Steven Eckholdt as Thumper Klein
- Lynn Clark as Susan Crawford

=== Guest stars ===
- Dean Cain as Brian
- Stan Ivar as Henry
- Patrick Warburton as Billy
- Courtney Thorne-Smith as Lisa
- Brenda Strong as Allison
- Brett Cullen as Ken
- Yancy Butler as Karen

== Episodes ==
No.	Title	Directed by	Written by	Original release date	Viewers (millions)
1	"The Janice and Brian Story"	David Frankel	David Frankel	June 15, 1992	15.9
2	"The Katie and Adam Story"	David Frankel	David Frankel	June 22, 1992	14.3
3	"The Fran and Joey Story"	David Frankel	David Frankel	June 29, 1992	13.2
4	"The Lisa and Billy Story"	David Frankel	David Frankel	July 6, 1992	11.9
5	"The Allison and Ken Story"	David Frankel	David Frankel	July 20, 1992	13.0
6	"The Jessica and Tony Story"	David Frankel	David Frankel	July 27, 1992	8.3

== 2000 version ==
Grapevine
- Created by: David Frankel
- Starring: Steven Eckholdt; Kristy Swanson; George Eads; David Sutcliffe
- Composer: John McCullough
- Country of origin: United States
- Original language: English
- No. of seasons: 1
- No. of episodes: 6 (1 unaired)

Production
- Camera setup: Single-camera
- Running time: 30 minutes
- Production companies: Paramount Network Television; CBS Productions

Original release
- Network: CBS
- Release: February 28 – March 27, 2000

=== Summary ===
The original Grapevine's interview style was cited as an influence on HBO hit Sex and the City. Barry Jossen produced both Grapevine and the first season of Sex in the City. CBS brought back Grapevine from February 28 to March 27, 2000. This time, David was played by Steven Eckholdt, Susan by Kristy Swanson, Thumper by George Eads, and a hotel manager, Matt, was played by David Sutcliffe

== Cast ==
- Steven Eckholdt as David Klein
- Kristy Swanson as Susan Crawford
- George Eads as Thumper Klein
- David Sutcliffe as Matt Brewer

== Episodes ==
No.	Title	Directed by	Written by	Original release date	Viewers (millions)
1	"Pilot"	David Frankel	David Frankel	February 28, 2000	11.14
2	"Thumper"	David Frankel	Unknown	March 6, 2000	10.81
3	"David"	David Frankel	David Frankel	March 13, 2000	10.09
4	"Jamie"	David Frankel	David Frankel	March 20, 2000	8.99
5	"Jack"	David Frankel	David Frankel	March 27, 2000	7.95
6	"Matt"	David Frankel	N/A	Unaired	N/A
