= Joy of Sex (film) =

1984 film by Martha Coolidge

- Theatrical release poster
- Directed by: Martha Coolidge
- Written by: Kathleen Rowell; Joyce Salter (as J.J. Salter); John Salter (as J.J. Salter)
- Based on: The Joy of Sex; 1972 book by Alex Comfort
- Produced by: Frank Konigsberg
- Starring: Colleen Camp; Ernie Hudson; Christopher Lloyd
- Cinematography: Charles Correll
- Edited by: Allan Jacobs; William Elias; Ned Humphreys
- Music by: Bishop Holiday; Scott Lipsker; Harold Payne
- Production company: National Lampoon
- Distributed by: Paramount Pictures
- Release date: August 3, 1984 (U.S.)
- Running time: 93 minutes
- Country: United States
- Language: English
- Budget: $5 million
- Box office: $4,463,841 (US)

Joy of Sex (sometimes referred to as National Lampoon's Joy of Sex) is a 1984 American sex comedy film directed by Martha Coolidge. It was written by Kathleen Rowell, and Joyce & John Salter (billed on screen as J.J. Salter), based on the sex manual by Alex Comfort.

== Plot ==
Leslie Hindenberg has just entered her senior year of high school. She visits her doctor to have a mole examined, but she mistakenly comes to believe she only has six weeks to live and goes about trying to lose her virginity. However, it is difficult for her to accomplish her goal as her father is the school's physical education coach. The boys are afraid to date the coach’s daughter. Alan Holt is a teenager whose friends brag about their sexual encounters. He is rather frustrated as he cannot stop thinking about sex and attempts to lose his virginity in any way possible.

== Cast ==
Actor	Role
Cameron Dye	Alan Holt
Michelle Meyrink	Leslie Hindenberg
Colleen Camp	Liz Sampson
Ernie Hudson	Mr. Porter
Lisa Langlois	Melanie
Darren Dalton	Ed Ingalls
Christopher Lloyd	Coach Hindenberg

== Production ==
Paramount Pictures paid a great amount of money to secure the rights to Alex Comfort’s sex manual just so they could use the title, which they found to be highly commercial.

In 1978 they hired Charles Grodin to write a script, telling him the movie "could be about anything". Grodin decided to use this exact situation as the premise: a Hollywood writer struggles to write a script based on a sex manual after a big studio acquires the rights. When he finished his first draft, Paramount passed. Grodin finally managed to get his screenplay green lit by MGM in 1985 as Movers & Shakers. In that movie, the sex manual is now called "Love in Sex".

According to the book Wired, John Belushi was supposed to appear in this movie, but he died before filming began. In her biography My Mother Was Nuts, Penny Marshall states she was slated to direct (this would have been her first feature film) from a script by John Hughes (which would have been his first script to be adapted for film). This version of the screenplay consisted of several unrelated vignettes. The producers wanted to have Belushi wearing diapers on the poster, even though no such scene appeared in Hughes' screenplay.

As the option on the book was running out, writer Kathleen Rowell, who had previously adapted The Outsiders, was approached about adapting the book into a script. Feeling not quite at home with writing comedy material, she enlisted her sister, Joyce Salter, and her husband John Salter, to help her in creating the storyline. The studio had suggested the premise of a teenage girl wanting to lose her virginity against a deadline, and pulling from their own experiences and an unproduced screenplay Rowell had written, came up with the final storyline. Due to the budgetary restrictions, only two writers could be credited, so Joyce and John took the collective pseudonym "J.J. Salter" for their onscreen credit.

Martha Coolidge was fired from the movie, for cutting many scenes of gratuitous nudity, but declined an opportunity to have her directing credit appear as Alan Smithee. National Lampoon producer Matty Simmons claims to have paid $250,000 to remove the National Lampoon name from the project:

"The National Lampoon's possible disassociation surfaced in a March newsletter to company shareholders, publicized this week by Daily Variety. National Lampoon Inc. Chairman Matty Simmons said in a phone interview Wednesday that the move "may have nothing to do with (the quality of the picture). We simply don't like to take credit or responsibility for a picture that we have nothing to do with." Simmons is officially titled as executive producer of Joy of Sex but his active participation ended when the original Joy of Sex project, including screenwriter John Hughes (National Lampoon's Vacation) and director Bill Norton collapsed."

== Release and reception ==
The film was given a theatrical release in the United States by Paramount Pictures in August 1984. It grossed $4,463,841 at the box office.

The film was given a release on VHS by Paramount Home Video in the 1980s. In 2025, the film, which never had a DVD, was released on Blu-ray by Vinegar Syndrome imprint Cinematographe.

Joy of Sex was panned by critics and audiences upon release. While the film has no critics' score on review aggregator website Rotten Tomatoes, 46% of over 1,000 audience members gave the film a positive rating. Its only currently registered critic review, coming from Brian Orndorf, is registered as 'Rotten." He called it "a DOA offering of shenanigans, and while a bit of effort is made to disrupt the usual in this type of entertainment, it's not enough to support a mess of a movie." Audiences polled by CinemaScore gave the film an average grade of "D" on an A+ to F scale.

Eleanor Mannikka of All Movie Guide has nothing but disdain for the movie:

The abysmal teen comedy Joy of Sex is stripped down to just sex in every line and in every joke except where other bodily functions come into play.

Producer Frank Konigsberg:

"Paramount was running out on their option on Alex Comfort's book. They had four months to start principle [sic] photography. They came to me and asked me to do it. They knew that in television you do things quickly. We threw together a script. They wanted me to use director Martha Coolidge, who'd just made Valley Girls (sic). It was a job. We just had to get it done. I didn't think it was a successful movie at all. It was awful. Martha hated it. I hated it."

Director Martha Coolidge:

"Paramount insisted on topless girls running down the hall because they thought the formula demanded it and it was totally gratuitous. I hated putting them in for no reason and argued against it. But when the film was previewed the audience, particularly young women and girls, hated the nudity so Paramount then asked me to cut as much of it out as I could! They had thought they were going to get a Porky's but the script was more from a girl's point of view (as was Valley Girl). It was actually a romance and certainly the women writers and I weren't the people to get a Porky's from. The movie wasn't what the execs thought it would be, they freaked, took me off the movie, cut it down, and tried to make the humor broader, which made it more disjointed. The entire budget was minuscule and the music was given only $20,000! For comparison, the Valley Girl soundtrack (not including score) cost $150,000. The whole Joy of Sex experience was pretty miserable. We were under constant pressure and scrutiny to do the impossible, we had eight days of prep, 20 days to shoot and my A.D. quit because he was so angry. I learned that I can't always save the day or be a hero and you have to protect yourself at all times. I did find some very talented actors though!"

Martha Coolidge was also quoted in a retrospective piece in the Los Angeles Times:

"It’s a wrenching decision", explains Martha Coolidge, who considered taking her name off of 1984’s Joy of Sex after the studio reworked her version, "but it’s made when the director finds himself or herself answering yes to these questions: Will the film 'embarrass me, humiliate me, disgust me for the rest of my life?'"

== Notes ==
- Scott, Vernon. “Telling Dad About Nude Scene Tough Role for Actress to Play. The Pittsburgh Press. United Press International. August 24, 1983.
- Thomas, Bob. “Lampoon to Spoof Hollywood on Film.” Associated Press. Star-News. Mar 1, 1981.
- Thomas, Bob. “Director Insists Joy of Sex not a raunchy skin comedy.” Associated Press. The Post and The Evening Times. Associated Press. Aug 3, 1984 (reprinted from July 1983).
- Uricchio, Marylynn. “Joy of Sex movie is unhappily terrible. Pittsburgh Post-Gazette. August 4, 1984.
- Wolf, William. “New York Calling.” Asbury Park Press. May 8, 1983.
