= The Wrong Woman =

1995 film by Douglas Jackson

- Genre: Thriller
- Written by: Douglas Soesbe
- Directed by: Douglas Jackson
- Starring: Nancy McKeon; Michele Scarabelli; Chelsea Field; Gary Hudson
- Music by: Marty Simon
- Country of origin: Canada
- Original language: English

Production
- Producers: Tom Berry; Pierre David
- Cinematography: Peter Benison
- Editors: José Heppell; Robert E. Newton
- Running time: 90 minutes
- Production company: Allegro Films

Original release
- Network: CBS
- Release: November 7, 1995

The Wrong Woman is a 1995 Canadian thriller film directed by Douglas Jackson and starring Nancy McKeon, Chelsea Field, and Michele Scarabelli. It was produced by Pierre David and written by Douglas Soesbe.

== Plot ==
An honest temporary employee (Nancy McKeon) finds herself accused of murder when the president of the real estate company to which she has been assigned is suddenly murdered before she can tell him that she discovered one of his regular workers has been robbing him blind. That she was having an affair with the slain man only complicates matters.

== Release ==
The film was broadcast on CBS March 26, 1996. Prior to that, it was released on video by Republic Pictures and is a frequent repeat on the Lifetime Network.

== Cast ==
- Nancy McKeon as Melanie Brooke
- Michele Scarabelli as Christine Henley
- Chelsea Field as Margaret Bateman
- Gary Hudson as Lt. Nagel
- Stephen Shellen as Tom Henley
- Lyman Ward as Jonah Slide
