= The Prey (1983 film) =

- Original poster art
- Directed by: Edwin Brown
- Screenplay by: Edwin Brown: Summer Brown
- Produced by: Summer Brown
- Starring: Debbie Thureson; Steve Bond
- Cinematography: João Fernandes: Gary Gero
- Edited by: Michael Barnard
- Music by: Don Peake
- Production company: Essex Productions
- Distributed by: New World Pictures
- Release date: October 7, 1983
- Running time: 80 minutes
- Country: United States
- Language: English
- Budget: $150,000
- Box office: $49,677

The Prey is a 1983 American slasher film directed by Edwin Brown, and starring Debbie Thureson, Steve Bond, Lori Lethin, and Jackie Coogan. It follows a group of campers in the Rocky Mountains who are stalked and murdered by a disfigured assailant.

Inspired by such films as The Hills Have Eyes (1977), the screenplay was written by director Brown and his wife, Summer, for Essex Productions, a studio specializing in adult films. Brown was previously a producer on one of their features, the softcore thriller Human Experiments (1979). Filming took place in late 1979 in Idyllwild, California. It was the final film credit of Coogan, who died in 1984.

The Prey was acquired for distribution by New World Pictures, and theatrically released in the United States in November 1983, nearly four years after completion. It was concurrently shown on premium television in Canada, and later released on VHS by Thorn EMI in 1988. In 2019, Arrow Films completed a restoration and released it on Blu-ray, marking the film's first home media release in North America since 1988. Contemporary critical opinion has varied, with its sparse dialogue and pacing being points of criticism. Other film scholars have praised its languorous pacing, which accelerates considerably in the final act. (Note: John Kenneth Muir lauds the film for its "fever pitch" climax, and deems the film "vastly underrated" in his book Horror Films of the 1980s (2011).)

== Plot ==
In 1948, a wildfire ravages the North Point section of the Keen Wild national forest in the Colorado Rocky Mountains, decimating a rural community of gypsies who live in seclusion in a cave. In 1980, older couple Frank and Mary Sylvester are camping in North Point one night when they are both murdered with an axe by an unseen figure.

A few weeks later, three young couples from California — Nancy and Joel, Bobbie and Skip, and Greg and Gail — embark on a hiking excursion in North Point. While purchasing their nature permits, the women speak with forest ranger Mark O'Brien, who tells them that few people venture into North Point. During their first night, Gail is smothered with her sleeping bag by the killer (an unusually tall man with a burned face), and Greg subsequently has his throat torn open. The following morning, the others awaken to find Greg and Gail have disappeared along with their gear. Nancy finds a tree smeared with blood but dismisses it as being from an animal. Assuming Gail and Greg went home, the group leave a note behind at their campsite and decide to continue with their trip. Meanwhile, Mark meets with head ranger Lester Tile, who informs him that he has received a call from the police regarding the Sylvesters' disappearance. Lester tells Mark a story about witnessing a young gypsy boy wandering the woods after the 1948 fire, horribly disfigured by burns.

Skip and Joel decide to hike to the infamous Suicide Peak to rappel down, while Nancy and Bobbie suntan at the base of the peak along a river. Mark hikes into North Point to search for the Sylvesters and finds vultures consuming Greg and Gail's decomposing bodies. Meanwhile, as Joel rappels down the peak, the killer breaks Skip's neck and cuts Joel's rope, causing him to fall to his death. Nancy and Bobbie hear his screams and run to the peak, where they are confronted by the disfigured killer: the gypsy boy from Lester's story, now fully grown, and with razor-sharp claws.

Nancy and Bobbie flee down the peak in terror, but Bobbie stumbles into one of the killer's booby traps, which lifts her into the air and thrashes her against a tree, killing her. Cornered by the killer, Nancy faces him alone until Mark appears, shooting him with a tranquilizer gun and bashing him in the face with a large stick. Mark comforts Nancy, but the killer awakens and kills him by crushing his throat. Instead of attacking Nancy, the killer smiles as he reaches softly towards her.

Some months later, during springtime, the crying of an infant — implicitly that of Nancy and the killer — is heard emanating from a cave in the mountains.

== Cast ==
- Debbie Thureson as Nancy
- Steve Bond as Joel
- Lori Lethin as Bobbie
- Robert Wald as Skip
- Gayle Gannes as Gail
- Philip Wenckus as Greg
- Jackson Bostwick as Mark O'Brien
- Jackie Coogan as Lester Tile
- Connie Hunter as Mary Sylvester
- Ted Hayden as Frank Sylvester
- Garry Goodrow as Sgt. Parsons
- Carel Struycken as The Monster
- John Leslie as Gypsy (uncredited)

== Production ==
=== Concept ===
The Prey was directed by Edwin Scott Brown, who also co-wrote the film with his wife Summer Brown, who served as the film's producer. The film was produced during the height of the slasher film boom, which had become popular after the wake of John Carpenter's immensely profitable 1978 film Halloween. The film was director-producer team's first non-pornographic feature, as they had previously worked making adult films. After serving as a producer on the softcore thriller film Human Experiments for Essex Productions, studio executive Joseph Steinman offered Edwin Brown a writing and directing job making "a horror film shot in the woods," a setting which at that time had not been greatly featured in horror films.

Brown and his wife Summer wrote the screenplay, choosing the Colorado Rockies as the setting, and were inspired by Halloween, as well as Wes Craven's The Hills Have Eyes (1977). Brown stated that he devised most of the film's plot trajectory and characters, writing drafts of scenes which Summer subsequently edited and organized into a comprehensive screenplay.

=== Casting ===
The film was lead actress Debbie Thureson's first screen role; she had previously appeared in a Maxim coffee advertisement with Kirk Douglas that aired in Japan. Thureson recalled that the screenplay featured little written dialogue, and that much of the filming involved improvisation between the actors. The film also marked actress Lori Lethin's first major film role, appearing as Bobbie, Nancy's friend; she would later become known as a scream queen for her lead roles in other horror films.

Former child star Jackie Coogan was cast as forest ranger Lester Tile. Coogan had previously starred in Charlie Chaplin's 1921 film The Kid before later starring in the role of Uncle Fester in the 1964 television series The Addams Family. The Prey would be Coogan's final film role released before his death from cardiac arrest on March 1, 1984 at the age of 69, though it was not his final film role. (Coogan's actual final film performance, in the 1982 drama The Escape Artist, was released more than a year before The Pray finally hit theaters.) Gayle Gannes, who portrayed Gail, was a UCLA student and friend of Edwin and Summer Brown who was encouraged by them to audition for the part. Gannes recalled that she was encouraged by Edwin Brown to play the role as "playful and ditzy." Carel Struycken, a Dutch actor, was cast in the role of the Monster due to his imposing figure, standing at 7 feet (2.1 m) in height.

=== Filming ===
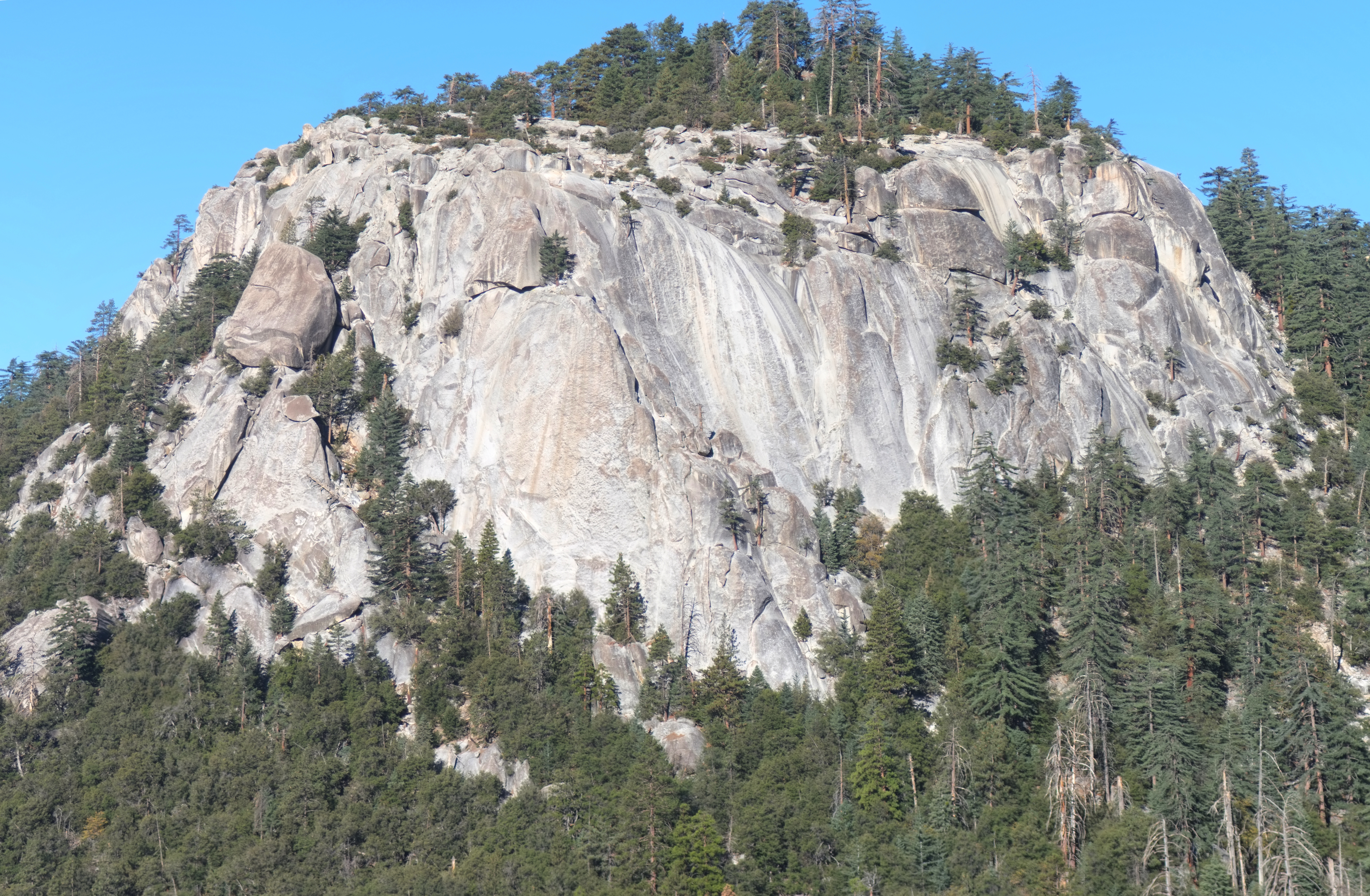
Suicide Rock in Idyllwild, California figures significantly in the film

Director Brown had wanted to shoot the film on location in Colorado, where it is set, but was unable to afford the production costs. The filmmakers initially scouted Big Bear, California, but decided to use Idyllwild instead, as it was less populated at the time, and was in close proximity to Los Angeles. Bostwick recalled that the filming locations were "In the mountains above Palm Springs, around the USC Music camp." Principal photography began in Idyllwild on in the fall of 1979, with a budget of approximately $150,000. The film was shot over the course of ten days, with filming occurring Monday through Friday between October 15 and October 29. The film was shot on 35mm with a Panaflex camera by cinematographer João Fernandes, who was credited under the pseudonym "Teru Hayashi." Additional photography of the wildlife close-ups was completed by Gary Gero.

Edwin Brown incorporated the various footage of animals as an "analogy" to the relationship between predator and prey, which applies to both animals and humans, though he conceded that some of the nature footage was added to increase the film's running time. Brown estimated that around 70 percent of the nature footage in the film was stock footage, while 30 percent was filmed by Fernandes and Gero. He has stated that, due to budgetary restrictions and running out of film stock, some sequences in the screenplay went uncompleted, including one in which Mark, the forest ranger, joins the campers at their campfire.

Producer Summer Brown spent a significant amount of time on set, and Thureson recalled her as being a "mother hen" figure to the cast and crew. Much of the dialogue between the characters was improvised, specifically during their hiking scenes. While the majority of the film was shot in Idyllwild, some sequences were filmed elsewhere: Coogan's scenes in the forest ranger station were shot on a studio set, while the sequence featuring Bostwick playing banjo was an insert shot filmed in Lake Mead, Nevada. Additional pickup shots were completed in Los Angeles in early 1980, including the final shot of the cave, which was filmed at the Bronson Caves in Griffith Park.

=== Special effects ===
John Carl Buechler served as a special effects designer on the film. Struycken recalled undergoing an elaborate latex makeup application to achieve his character's deformed appearance.

=== Music ===
The film's score was composed by Don Peake, who had also composed the score of The Hills Have Eyes (1977). Director Edwin Brown was an acquaintance of that film's producer, Peter Locke, and was put in contact with Peake to write a musical score. Producer Summer Brown stated that Edwin wanted a musical score that was "Rachmaninoff[-like]—big, thundering."

== Release ==
The Prey was theatrically released by New World Pictures on October 7, 1983. The film screened in late October 1983 in Del Rio, Texas, and as of November 4, 1983, it was continuing to screen in cities such as Louisville, Kentucky. It subsequently screened on premium television stations in Canada beginning November 8, 1983, and continued to screen on the Showtime television network throughout September 1984. The film continued screening theatrically in the United States in various cities throughout 1984.

=== Home media ===
Thorn EMI Video released the film on VHS in the United States in 1988, featuring the original 80-minute theatrical cut. The Prey remained unavailable on DVD and Blu-ray until 2019, when Arrow Films announced a 2-disc limited edition Blu-ray release in the United States, featuring a new restoration and three different cuts of the film. The restored theatrical version of the film was screened at the 2019 Texas Frightmare Weekend with stars Lori Lethin, Carel Struycken, and Jackson Bostwick in attendance. The Blu-ray was released in both the 2-disc limited edition as well as a standard single-disc edition on September 17, 2019 in the United Kingdom, with a street date of October 1 in North America.

==== Alternative cut ====
An alternative international home video cut of The Prey, which runs approximately 97 minutes, incorporates an expository flashback and eliminates 6 minutes of the nature footage present in the original 80-minute cut. The flashback, set in 1948, elucidates the origins of the film's killer, only alluded to by the forest ranger, Lester Tile, in the theatrical cut. The flashback entails two men who commit arson at the gypsy commune after one of the men finds that a gypsy has had sex with his wife; it is implied that the killer, then a child, was maimed in this fire. The additional footage featured in this sequence was shot by an unknown director in the summer of 1981, and was incorporated as a campfire story told by Joel to his friends. In order to make the insertion of the footage more seamless, dubbing from an unknown actor was used in place of Steve Bond.

This flashback sequence is present on several international VHS editions, including the Japanese release, and was added at the insistence of Essex Productions executive Joseph Steinman, who wanted the film to contain more nudity. The flashback features several sex scenes. Edwin Brown stated in 2019 that he had no involvement in the writing or filming of this footage, and felt it was "badly shot and badly edited."

== Reception ==
=== Box office ===
The film opened in 26 theaters in the United States in the fall of 1983, and grossed $49,677 at the box office.

=== Critical response ===
TV Guide awarded the film one out of five stars, writing: "The killer in this standard mad-slasher-in-the-woods effort is a crazed gypsy mutant horribly burned in a fire that occurred 30 years before. Still angry and wielding an ax, he lumbers off after a bunch of camping youths. There is not one iota of creativity here." Ron Castell in the Blockbuster Video Guide called the film a "tiresome shocker, which contains the absolute minimum of plot and dialogue required to make a horror film."

Charles Tatum from eFilmCritic.com awarded the film one of five stars, stating, "There is not one minute of suspense here." Tatum summarized by saying, "Sure, most of the slasher films of the 1980s were not worth the celluloid they were filmed on, but this video nightmare may well be the dullest produced." The slasher film website Hysteria Lives! gave the film an unfavorable review, stating, "THE PREY is dumb, boring (I had to push needles into my legs just to stop from slipping into a catatonic state), and pitifully indulgent."

Dread Central gave the film a favorable review, calling it "an effective little backwoods slasher offering some vicious kills and a memorable, downbeat shock ending". Film scholar John Kenneth Muir praised the film, writing: "For horror aficionados, The Prey remains a superior (and vastly underrated) film of its genre because it reaches a fever pitch of terror near the climax." Muir also notes the recurrent "man vs. nature" theme in the film, accentuated by the repeated sequences of wildlife interspersed throughout the narrative.

Film scholar Thomas Sipos, however, characterized the film as "basically a travelogue" due to its ubiquitous nature footage. In his book The Gorehound’s Guide to Splatter Films of the 1980s, Scott Aaron Stine echoes a similar sentiment, writing: "The highlights (be as they may) are some impressive National Geographic-style nature photography. In fact, there's so much stock footage (did I just hear someone shout "padding"?) that the person responsible was given co-cinematographer's, and deserved it." Stine also commented on the film's gore, calling it "standard," and noted the monster makeup as "shoddy."

== Sources ==
- Bawden, James; Miller, Ron (2016). Conversations with Classic Film Stars: Interviews from Hollywood's Golden Era. Lexington, Kentucky: University Press of Kentucky. ISBN 978-0-813-16712-1. OCLC 1023312847.
- Brown, Edwin; Cant, Ewan (2019). The Prey (Blu-ray audio commentary). Arrow Films. OCLC 1128829100.
- Brown, Summer; Cant, Ewan (2019). The Prey (Blu-ray audio commentary). Arrow Films. OCLC 1128829100.
- Cant, Ewan (2019). Tracking The Prey (Blu-ray booklet). London, England: Arrow Films. pp. 7–21. OCLC 1128829100.
- Castell, Ron, ed. (1995). Blockbuster Video Guide to Movies and Videos, 1996. Dell. ISBN 978-0-440-22114-2. OCLC 733804349.
- Clover, Carol (1993). Men, Women, and Chainsaws: Gender in the Modern Horror Film. Princeton, New Jersey: Princeton University Press. ISBN 978-0-691-00620-8. OCLC 919125331.
- Muir, John Kenneth (2011). Horror Films of the 1980s. Vol. 1. Jefferson, North Carolina: McFarland. ISBN 978-0-786-45501-0. OCLC 830347241.
- Rubin, Joe (2019). Restoring Something That Never Existed: Reconstructing The Prey (Blu-ray booklet). London, England: Arrow Films. pp. 21–23. OCLC 1128829100.
- Sipos, Thomas M. (2010). Horror Film Aesthetics: Creating the Visual Language of Fear. Jefferson, North Carolina: McFarland. ISBN 978-0-786-45834-9. OCLC 607320273.
- Stine, Scott Aaron (2003). The Gorehound's Guide to Splatter Films of the 1980s. Jefferson, North Carolina: McFarland. ISBN 978-1-476-61132-7. OCLC 475125956.
