= Can't Hurry Love =

- Genre: Sitcom
- Created by: Gina Wendkos
- Directed by: James Widdoes
- Starring: Nancy McKeon; Mariska Hargitay; Louis Mandylor; Kevin Crowley
- Theme music composer: Jonathan Wolff; Paul Buckley
- Country of origin: United States
- Original language: English
- No. of seasons: 1
- No. of episodes: 19

Production
- Executive producers: Gina Wendkos; Tom Palmer; Jonathan Axelrod; James Widdoes; Amy Sherman-Palladino
- Producers: Chuck Binder; Nancy McKeon; Patricia Fass Palmer
- Camera setup: Multi-camera
- Running time: 23-25 minutes
- Production companies: The Producers Entertainment Group Ltd. Axelrod-Widdoes Productions; CBS Entertainment Productions; CBS Productions; TriStar Television

Original release
- Network: CBS
- Release: September 18, 1995 – February 26, 1996

Can't Hurry Love is an American sitcom television series created by Gina Wendkos, starring Nancy McKeon and Mariska Hargitay, that aired on CBS from September 18, 1995, to February 26, 1996.

== Premise ==
The series centers on Annie, a single, thirty-something woman living in New York and her three friends: Didi, Roger and Elliot. Most episodes revolve around Annie finding love or the romantic interests of her friends. Most of the action takes place in Annie's studio apartment, the employment agency she, Roger and Elliot work at, and a local bar they all frequent called Wreck's.

== Cast ==
- Nancy McKeon as Annie O'Donnell
- Mariska Hargitay as Didi Edelstein
- Louis Mandylor as Roger Carlucci
- Kevin Crowley as Elliot Tenney

== Cancellation ==
The series was canceled after one season despite having an average household rating of 11.4, tying it for 24th place among all TV shows that year.

== Episodes ==
Season	Episodes	Originally released		Rank	Rating
Season	Episodes	First released	Last released	Rank	Rating
1	19	September 18, 1995	February 26, 1996	24	11.4 (Note: Tied with Law & Order, The CBS Sunday Movie, and The Naked Truth)

No.	Title	Directed by	Written by	Original release date	Viewers (millions)
1	"Pilot"	James Widdoes	Gina Wendkos	September 18, 1995	19.5
Single career woman Annie is looking for love in New York City and coming up dry. While riding the subway to work, she meets a sexy police detective. But, his hobbies ruffle Annie's feathers.
2	"Truth, Dare and a Rodent"	James Widdoes	Tom Palmer	September 25, 1995	16.6
After waking up in the middle of the night to a rat crawling around her bed, the group meets at Annie's apartment. To pass the time, they decide to play truth or dare, though they all end up picking dare. Elliot has to wear a bright red speedo while ordering a drink at the bar. Didi has to go to a funeral and take a picture of herself with the corpse (though she's terrified to see a dead body). Roger has to get a massage from a man. After Annie won't confess to which group member she's dreamt about, she's dared to ask someone out.
3	"St. Elgin Chicks"	James Widdoes	Amy Sherman-Palladino	October 2, 1995	14.7
Annie is having a terrible week with work and a mystery puddle in her apartment. Meanwhile, Didi has no date for her birthday. As things go from bad to worse, they decide to spend a whirlwind night at The Plaza Hotel using a discount coupon and a $400 credit card. Meanwhile, Roger and Elliot have a boy's night at the office.
4	"A Fish Called Gregg"	James Widdoes	Colleen Taber and Ellen Svaco	October 9, 1995	14.9
Annie meets Dr. Gregg, the perfect British suitor, until a glimpse of a body "defect" changes her mind. Willing to get surgery, Gregg expects her to reciprocate to meet his beauty standards. Elliot has recurring murderous dreams about Roger, which neither can understand.
5	"Not Home Alone"	James Widdoes	Nick Lerose	October 16, 1995	16.9
Annie is terribly sick but finds herself entangled in everyone's problems, namely Roger's hypochondria, Didi's boyfriend problems, Elliot's story submission, and a possibly dead next-door neighbor.
6	"Annie Get Your Armoire"	James Widdoes	John Frink and Don Payne	October 23, 1995	17.5
Looking to fulfill a wish to a dying grandmother, Roger proposes to Annie. At first, she refuses but goes along with it. Until she puts on her mother's wedding dress. But is even a pretend wedding too much of a commitment?
7	"Party Chicks"	James Widdoes	Amy Sherman-Palladino	October 30, 1995	15.9
When Didi and Annie throw a rent party, a secret from Didi's past causes Annie to question their friendship. Gail's hectic job at the District Attorney's office makes Elliot feel alone. Meanwhile, Roger is smothered by his latest conquest.
8	"The Burning Mattress (a.k.a. Burning Bed)"	James Widdoes	Lenny Ripps and Rob Dames	November 6, 1995	17.1
After a mattress fire destroys Roger's apartment, Annie helps him shop for a new bed. But, when they kiss and feel nothing, It's uncertain what the future will hold. Nancy McKeon's former The Facts of Life co-star Charlotte Rae makes a guest appearance as Helen.
9	"Three Blind Dates"	James Widdoes	Pat Dougherty	November 13, 1995	17.6
Blind dates abound for the group: Annie tries her luck with a smooth operator, matching Roger with a nice old-fashioned girl. Didi finds herself with a date who is unconcerned with outer beauty. With Gail's permission, Didi surprises Elliot with a special lady.
10	"Glove Story"	James Widdoes	John Frink and Don Payne	November 20, 1995	15.8
Peter comes back into Annie's life and sweeps her off her feet. But, the whirlwind romance goes awry when a friendly boxing match with Roger snowballs into a macho competition. Meanwhile, Elliot explores couples counseling, while Didi peddles cosmetics.
11	"Daddy's Girl"	James Widdoes	Amy Sherman-Palladino	December 4, 1995	15.6
Annie's father (Alex Rocco) comes to visit for the holidays. She notices him acting strange, in that he's embracing newer experiences in life. It comes to light that he broke up with his long-time girlfriend and is selling the house where Annie grew up.
12	"A Very Kafka Christmas"	James Widdoes	Bill Barol	December 18, 1995	11.0
Didi reveals that Annie had a one-night stand with a professor, leading to a fight between the two friends. This comes as them, Roger, and Elliot are trying to put together a Christmas dinner for the poor.
13	"The Rent Strike"	James Widdoes	Maria Semple	January 8, 1996	18.7
Annie organizes a rent because of the strike. But, things go from bad to worse when the heat and electricity go out too. As things grow dim, Didi and Annie remain the only two holdouts. Soon, the building's owner Broadway producer, Maxwell Sheffield, special guest star (Charles Shaughnessey) learns of the conditions and makes things right.
14	"Restless in Chelsea"	James Widdoes	Pam Veasey	January 15, 1996	16.6
After seeing a list of accomplishments from her childhood diary, Annie decides to shake things up on her birthday. First, she calls into a radio show for a date with a mysterious stranger as "Restless in Chelsea". Elliot and Roger plan a surprise birthday party not realizing Annie might be booked.
15	"The Boss"	James Widdoes	Susan Fales-Hill	January 22, 1996	16.1
The new boss at Annie, Roger and Elliot's job comes in undercover to see how the office operates. The three co-workers scramble to keep their jobs, under Mr. Barbour's strict office policies. Annie and Roger are pushed on principles to a breaking point, particularly with Didi's lax attitude to her latest job.
16	"Between the Lines"	John Bowab	Jonathan Aibel and Glenn Berger	February 5, 1996	15.8
Didi becomes an assistant to a famous playwright leading Annie to meet handsome actor Matt. Elliot begs Didi to pass along his play to her boss. It's role reversal when Roger is enthralled with an independent career woman.
17	"Valentine's Day Massacred"	James Widdoes	John Frink and Don Payne	February 12, 1996	16.3
Matt plans a special Valentine's Day dinner for Annie, but it's shot to hell when Elliot, drunk and distraught, shows up after being served with divorce papers. Meanwhile, Didi and Roder go to a gay bar to help avoid his stalker.
18	"I Never Cooked for My Father"	James Widdoes	Bill Barol	February 19, 1996	16.1
When Roger's father comes to visit, he's looking at this as a chance to reconnect with him. Annie helps him get a job, but doesn't realize he's an ex-con. Roger decides to talk to his dad about what it means to have a father-and-son relationship.
19	"The Elizabeth Taylor Episode (a.k.a. Liz Taylor Show)"	James Widdoes	Jonathan Aibel and Glenn Berger	February 26, 1996	19.1
This episode was part of Taylor Made Monday wherein Elizabeth Taylor appears on four different sitcoms. In a story that began on The Nanny when Elizabeth Taylor asked Fran to make sure her black pearls arrived at a place where she needed them. And Fran chose to bring them herself and took a cab but when she got in an accident the pearls were left behind. Now, Annie and Didi are riding in the same cab and find the pearls. Annie wears them on a date and loses them, later learning they belong to Elizabeth Taylor. She then goes to a department store with Didi and goes into a dressing room and learns Elizabeth Taylor is there. Didi wants to see her but Annie doesn't want to. Unfortunately, that's when Didi blurts out that Annie lost her necklace.
