= Nancy McKeon =

American actress (b. 1966)

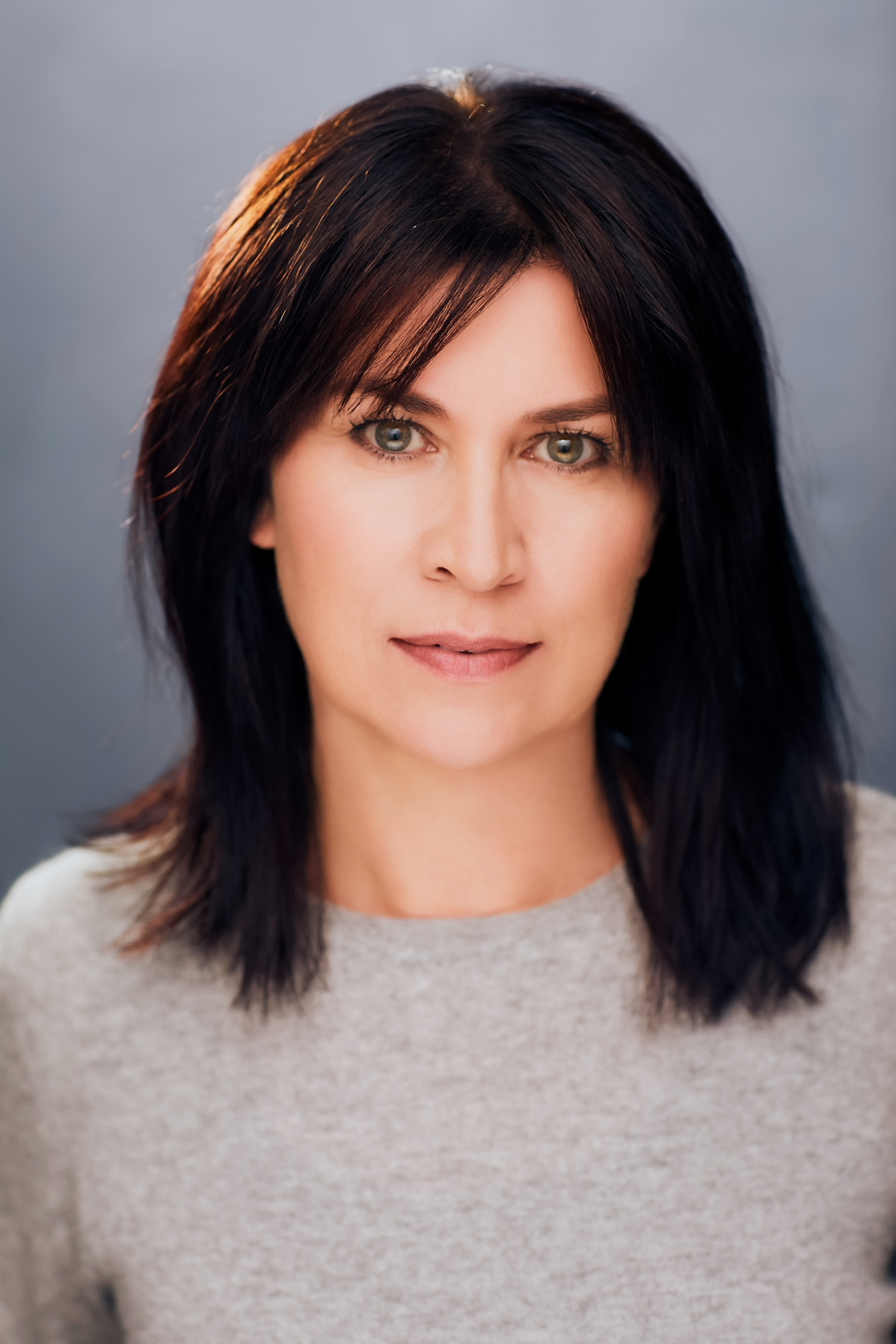
- Born: Nancy Justine McKeon; April 4, 1966 (age 60); Westbury, New York, U.S.
- Occupation: Actress
- Years active: 1977–present
- Known for: The Facts of Life; The Division; Can't Hurry Love; Comfort and Joy
- Spouse: Marc Andrus (m. 2003)
- Children: 2
- Relatives: Philip McKeon (brother)

Nancy Justine McKeon (born April 4, 1966) is an American actress. She is known for her roles as Jo Polniaczek on the NBC sitcom The Facts of Life and Jinny Exstead on The Division.

== Early life and family ==
Nancy Justine McKeon was born on April 4, 1966, in Westbury, New York, to Barbara McKeon and travel agent Donald McKeon. She began her entertainment career by modeling baby clothing for the Sears & Roebuck catalog at age two. During some of her childhood, the family resided in Forest Hills, New York in Queens.

== Career ==
=== Youth ===
McKeon appeared on the soap operas The Secret Storm and Another World. In 1979, she was discovered by a casting director for The Facts of Life on the basis of her performance in a Hallmark advertisement, in which she was able to cry on cue. She was cast as tomboy Jo Polniaczek in the fall of 1980 during the show's second season after four of the first season's cast were dismissed from the show. McKeon also provided the voice for many ABC Weekend Special cartoon characters, including the voice for Scruffy.

While she was working on The Facts of Life, McKeon attended school on-set with tutors, having attended Catholic school prior to that. In an interview with Tom Snyder in 1998, she joked that she "was given detention a few times" for not adhering to the strict rules of school, which included not wearing her favorite patent leather shoes.

=== Adulthood ===
In 1990, McKeon was courted by NBC executives for the title role in the TV sitcom adaptation of the 1988 film Working Girl; the role, played by Melanie Griffith in the movie, instead went to then unknown Sandra Bullock. In 1994, McKeon and Courteney Cox auditioned for the role of Monica Geller on the sitcom Friends. The role went to Cox. In 1995, she starred in her own series, Can't Hurry Love, which lasted one season. In 1998, she starred with Jean Smart in the sitcom Style & Substance.

McKeon portrayed Inspector Jinny Exstead on the Lifetime police drama The Division from 2001 to 2004, with her pregnancy incorporated into the storyline of the last year of the series. From 2009 to 2010, she appeared in a recurring role in the Disney Channel Original Series Sonny with a Chance as Connie Munroe, the mother of Demi Lovato's title character.

McKeon starred in numerous made-for-TV movies in the 1980s and 1990s, including A Cry for Help: The Tracey Thurman Story, in which she portrayed the title role of Tracey Thurman, and The Wrong Woman, portraying a woman framed for killing her boss. In Strange Voices, she portrayed a woman with schizophrenia. She produced many of these movies through her film company, Forest Hills Entertainment (named after her childhood neighborhood, Forest Hills).

In 1999, she wrote and directed her own short film, A Wakening. She explained on the TV show Biography that directing had always been a personal ambition, so she wrote the movie in order to direct. The film won two film festival awards. She also directed two episodes of The Division.

In 2003, McKeon starred in the film Comfort and Joy.

McKeon has narrated several audiobooks.

She has a brief cameo appearance in 2019's You Light Up My Christmas, a movie starring her Facts of Life co-star Kim Fields. The movie includes other cast members from the show. McKeon was supposed to have a larger role in the movie, but was unable to film more due to a family emergency. Also in 2019, McKeon announced on social media her involvement in a new, planned Amazon series based on the Lauren Oliver young adult novel Panic. The first season premiered in 2021.

=== Theatre ===
In 2025, McKeon regularly appeared in the off-Broadway play "Pen Pals", which featured a rotating cast. In 2026, she appeared in the New Jersey Repertory Theatre's production of "LOOK".

== Personal life ==
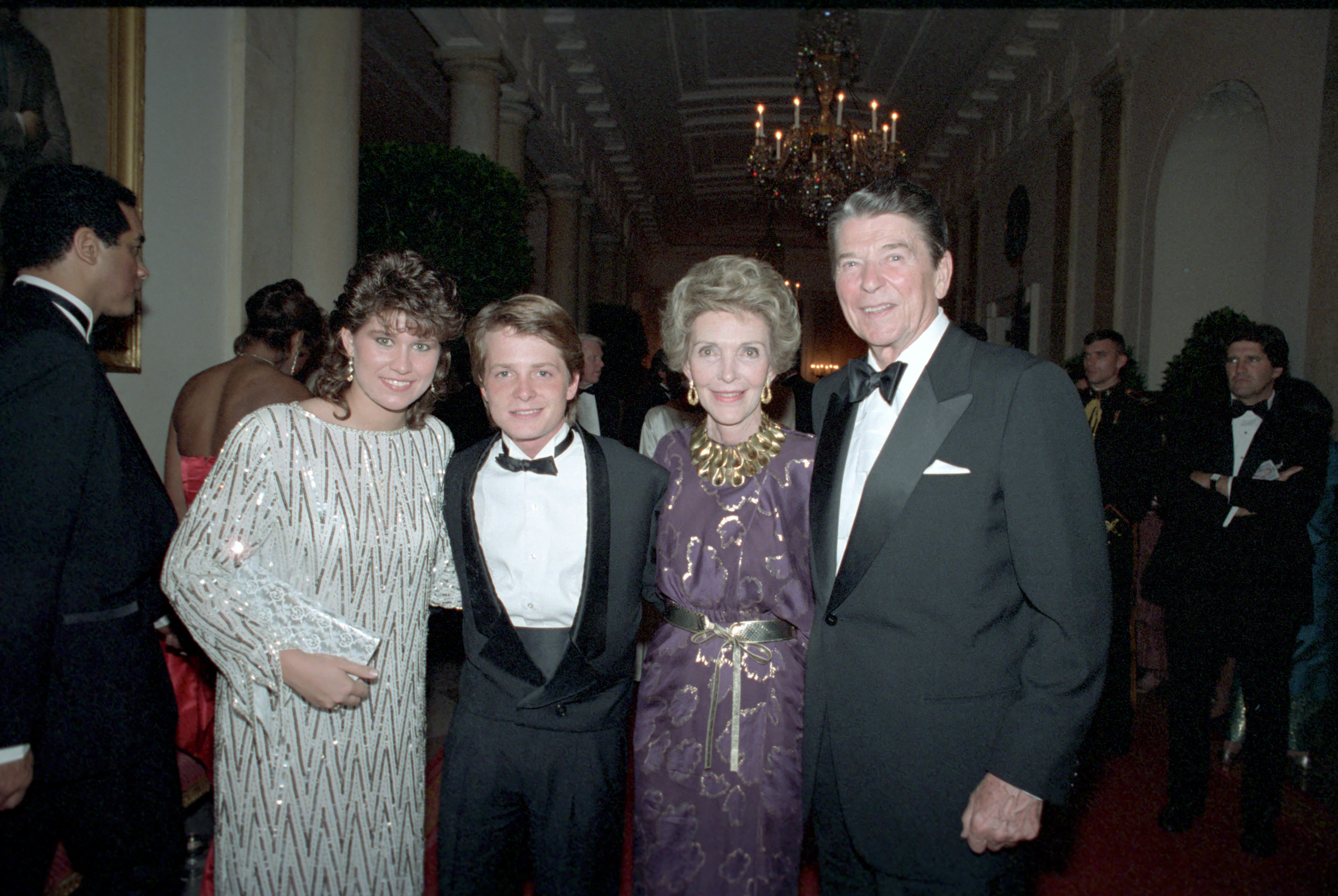
McKeon, Michael J. Fox, Nancy Reagan and Ronald Reagan

While McKeon was on The Facts of Life, she and her parents were granted a private audience with Pope John Paul II. She described the experience to interviewer Tom Snyder in 1998 as "electric," explaining, "In every rendering of every artist, you see this aura that's painted around figures...He has that in life."

McKeon dated actor Michael J. Fox for three years after they met on the set of High School U.S.A. (1983). "He and I were very private people," McKeon told Biography. "We didn't tell a lot of people, and we kind of kept to ourselves." McKeon and Fox appeared together as a celebrity couple on the game show Tattletales.

In 2003, McKeon married film technician Marc Andrus, after meeting eight years prior on the set of the Hallmark movie, A Mother’s Gift. A private pair seeking to keep the event small, the two only had 20 guests at the wedding. They have two children.

== Filmography ==
=== Film ===
Year	Title	Role	Notes
1992	Where the Day Takes You	Vikki	
1994	Teresa's Tattoo	Sara	
1995	The Wrong Woman	Melanie Brooke	
1997	Just Write	Bride	
1999	A Wakening		Short film; Director, writer

=== Television ===
Year	Title	Role	Notes
1977	Starsky & Hutch	Vikki Mayer	"The Crying Child"
1978	Return to Fantasy Island	Ann	TV film
1978	Alice	Girl Orphan	"Who Ordered the Hot Turkey?"
1978	A Question of Love	Susan Moreland	TV film
1979	The Love Boat	Penny Barrett	"Daddy's Pride"
1979	The Puppy's Great Adventure	Dolly (voice)	TV film
1980	Stone	Jill Stone	TV series (9 episodes)
1980	The Puppy's Amazing Rescue	Dolly (voice)	TV film
1980	The Trouble with Miss Switch	Amelia Daley (voice)	TV film
1980	Scruffy	Scruffy (voice)	TV film
1980	ABC Afterschool Special	Lucy Twining	"Schoolboy Father"
1980–81	Thundarr the Barbarian	Tye / Tai (voice)	"Harvest of Doom", "Last Train to Doomsday"
1980–88	The Facts of Life	Jo Polniaczek	TV series (189 episodes)
1981	Alice	Kimberly	"Alice's Halloween Surprise"
1981	The Puppy Saves the Circus	Dolly (voice)	TV film
1982	Miss Switch to the Rescue	Amelia Daley (voice)	TV film
1982–83	The Scooby & Scrappy-Doo/Puppy Hour	Dolly (voice)	TV series (13 episodes: The Puppy's New Adventures segment)
1982	The Facts of Life Goes to Paris	Jo Polniaczek	TV film
1983	Dusty	Slugger	TV film
1983	ABC Afterschool Special	Nancy Parks	"Please Don't Hit Me, Mom"
1983–84	The Puppy's Further Adventures	Dolly (voice)	TV series (8 episodes)
1983	High School U.S.A.	Beth Franklin	TV film
1985	Poison Ivy	Rhonda Malone	TV film
1985	This Child Is Mine	Kimberly Downs	TV film
1986	Firefighter	Cindy Fralick	TV film
1987	The Facts of Life Down Under	Jo Polniaczek	TV film
1987	Strange Voices	Nicole 'Nikki' Glover	TV film
1989	A Cry for Help: The Tracey Thurman Story	Tracey Thurman	TV film
1990	The Hitchhiker	Dawn Wilder	"New Dawn"
1991	Lightning Field	Martha Townsend	TV film
1992	Baby Snatcher	Karen Williams	TV film
1993	Love, Honor & Obey: The Last Mafia Marriage	Rosalie Profaci Bonanno	TV film
1995	A Mother's Gift	Margaret Deal	TV film
1995–96	Can't Hurry Love	Annie O'Donnell	TV series (19 episodes)
1998	Style & Substance	Jane Sokol	TV series (13 episodes)
1999	In My Sister's Shadow	Joan Connor	TV film
1999	Touched by an Angel	Rachel Waters	"The Last Day of the Rest of Your Life"
2001–04	The Division	Inspector Jinny Exstead	TV series (88 episodes); Director: episodes "Full Moon" (S2), "The Cost of Freedom" (S3)
2003	Comfort and Joy	Jane Berry	TV film
2004	Category 6: Day of Destruction	Amy Harkin	TV miniseries
2006	Wild Hearts	Emily	TV film
2007	Without a Trace	Gail Sweeney	"Absalom"
2009–10	Sonny with a Chance	Connie Munroe	TV series (5 episodes)
2011	Love Begins	Millie	TV film
2018	Dancing with the Stars	Contestant	TV series (5 episodes)
2019	You Light Up My Christmas	Kathy	TV film
2021	Panic	Jessica Mason	TV series (6 episodes)

== Awards and nominations ==
Marco Island Film Festival

- 2000: Won, "Audience Award for Best Short Drama"—A Wakening
- 2000: Won, "Crystal Palm Award for Best Short Film"—A Wakening

Prism Awards

- 2003: Nominated, "Best Performance in a Drama Series Episode"—The Division
- 2003: Nominated, "Best Performance in a Drama Series"—The Division
- 2004: Nominated, "Best Performance in a Drama Series Multi Episode Storyline"—The Division

TV Land Awards

- 2007: Nominated, "The 'When Bad Teens Go Good' Award"—The Facts of Life

Young Artist Awards

- 1982: Nominated, "Best Young Comedienne in Motion Picture or Television"—The Facts of Life
- 1983: Won, "Best Young Actress in a Television Special"—Please Don't Hit Me, Mom
- 1983: Won, "Best Young Actress in a Movie Made for Television"—The Facts of Life Goes to Paris
- 1983: Won, "Best Young Actress in a Comedy Series"—The Facts of Life
- 1984: Nominated, "Best Young Actress in a Comedy Series"—The Facts of Life
