= Greg H. Sims =

American film producer

Greg Sims is an American entertainment executive, film producer, and writer.

== Biography ==
One of his earliest works was the 1987 comedy/horror/spoof Return to Horror High. George Clooney had a role in the film and later appeared in another Sims production, Red Surf (1990), in what would be his first leading feature film role. Sims continued producing films and wrote The Fear in 1995 and Touch Me (1997). Touch Me was an Official Selection, President's Choice, of the 2017 edition of The Toronto International Film Festival.

At the beginning of 2005, Sims became the co-manager of Anouk, an EMI-Virgin Records recording artist. He was a witness in Phil Spector's murder trial. He also has started the company Vesuvio Entertainment Corporation which is a distribution company involved in the US theatrical, home entertainment (DVD/video) and television markets, as well as all foreign markets. The first film produced by Vesuvio Entertainment was the psychological thriller Behind Your Eyes in (2011), which won two film festival awards and was released on DVD and Redbox on March 20, 2012. In 2013, Vesuvio Entertainment acquired the international distribution rights for Craigslist Joe, a film about a man who travels around the country, dependent entirely on connections he makes through Craigslist. In February 2013, Sims became the manager for Martha Davis and The Motels.

In 2015, Sims and Vesuvio entered into a distribution agreement for the documentary An Open Secret, directed by Amy Berg. Sims partnered with Rocky Mountain Pictures to distribute the film theatrically in the US, but ultimately opted to terminate the overall distribution arrangement.

In August 2016, The Hollywood Reporter announced that Sims had set up a new management division, Arya Artist Management, and had signed Greg Louganis In 2018, Sims, through Arya Worldwide Entertainment, handled theatrical distribution of the indie film The Divide, which was the directorial debut of actor Perry King. In 2019, the film won Best Picture for premiere western Cowboys and Indians Magazine's annual C&I Movie Awards, and Best Actor for King. In January 2019, Arya signed singer/songwriter Evan Henzi for personal management.
