= My Big Fat Greek Wedding (franchise) =

American media franchise

- Official franchise logo
- Created by: Nia Vardalos
- Owners: Focus Features; (Universal Pictures)
- Years: 2002–2023

Films and television
- Film(s): My Big Fat Greek Wedding (2002); My Big Fat Greek Wedding 2 (2016); My Big Fat Greek Wedding 3 (2023)
- Television series: My Big Fat Greek Life (2003)

The My Big Fat Greek Wedding franchise, consists of American romantic comedies, including three theatrical films, and a television series. The series was created by Nia Vardalos.

== Films ==
Film	U.S. release date	Director	Screenwriter	Producers	Release type	Status
My Big Fat Greek Wedding	April 19, 2002	Joel Zwick	Nia Vardalos	Tom Hanks, Rita Wilson & Gary Goetzman	Theatrical	Released
My Big Fat Greek Wedding 2	March 25, 2016	Kirk Jones	Nia Vardalos	Tom Hanks, Rita Wilson & Gary Goetzman	Theatrical	Released
My Big Fat Greek Wedding 3	September 8, 2023	Nia Vardalos	Nia Vardalos	Tom Hanks, Rita Wilson & Gary Goetzman	Theatrical	Released

=== My Big Fat Greek Wedding (2002) ===
Everyone in the Portokalos family worries about Toula (Nia Vardalos). Still unmarried in her 30's, she works at Dancing Zorba's, the Greek restaurant owned by her parents, Gus (Michael Constantine) and Maria (Lainie Kazan). After taking a job at her aunt's travel agency, she falls in love with Ian Miller (John Corbett), a teacher who is tall, handsome, and definitely not Greek. Toula isn't sure which will be more upsetting to her father, that Ian is a foreigner or that he's a vegetarian. The film was a sleeper hit, and the film became the highest-grossing romantic comedy of all time. The film grossed $241 million domestically for a worldwide total of $368 million, despite not reaching No. 1 at the box office, against a $5 million budget. The film was nominated for an Academy Award for Best Original Screenplay at the 75th Academy Awards.

=== My Big Fat Greek Wedding 2 (2016) ===
17 years after the first film, parenting and marriage is becoming tougher and tougher for Toula (Nia Vardalos) and her husband Ian (John Corbett). Not only has their relationship lost some of its spark, but they're also dealing with a rebellious teenage daughter who clashes with Greek traditions. On top of that, Toula must contend with aging parents and the endless need of cousins and friends. But when a shocking family secret comes to light, the entire Portokalos clan makes plans to come together for an even bigger wedding than before. The film was less successful than the original, grossing $59 million domestically, with a $88 million worldwide gross, against an $18 million budget.

=== My Big Fat Greek Wedding 3 (2023) ===
In late June 2016, Nia Vardalos hinted at the possibility of a third film, saying that although no writing has been done, she does have an idea. On April 8, 2021, it was announced that My Big Fat Greek Wedding 3 was in development, to be written by Vardalos as an independent film, who will also reprise her role as co-star. The project was also revealed to have been delayed by the COVID-19 pandemic, in which production will commence once the studios maintains insurance for its crew, with principal photography scheduled to take place in Greece. On October 1, 2021, Vardalos confirmed that the script for the third film had been completed and that it would involve another Greek wedding. On May 15, 2022, it was announced that filming will take place throughout Greece in the summer of 2022, with large portions being shot on Corfu from July 5 to August 3, 2022. The film will be dedicated to the memory of Michael Constantine, who died on August 31, 2021, at the age of 94. In June 2022, Vardalos was announced to serve as director, with a script that she wrote. Principal photography commenced in Athens, Greece on June 22, 2022, and wrapped on August 10, 2022. The project will be a joint-venture production between Playtone, Gold Circle Films, HBO Films, and Focus Features. The film was released on September 8, 2023. The film follows the Portokalos family on a trip to Greece for a family reunion following the death of Toula's father, Gus.

== Television ==
The film inspired the short-lived television spin-off My Big Fat Greek Life (2003). Most of the major characters were played by the same actors, with the exception of John Corbett being replaced by Steven Eckholdt.

The show received poor reviews from critics noting the random character entrances and serious plot "adjustments" that did not match the film. The seven episodes from the series are available on DVD from Sony Pictures Home Entertainment, whose TV studio division produced the show.

== Primary cast and characters ==
List indicator

This section includes characters who will appear or have appeared in more than two films in the series.

- An empty grey cell indicates the character was not in the film, or that the character's official presence has not yet been confirmed.

Characters	Film			Television
Characters	My Big Fat Greek Wedding	My Big Fat Greek Wedding 2	My Big Fat Greek Wedding 3	My Big Fat Greek Life
Fortoula "Toula" Nia Portokalos-Miller	Nia Vardalos	Nia Vardalos	Nia Vardalos	Nia Vardalos
Ian Thomas Miller	John Corbett	John Corbett	John Corbett	Steven Eckholdt
Paris Miller	Arielle Sugarman	Elena Kampouris	Elena Kampouris	
Maria Portokalos	Lainie Kazan	Lainie Kazan	Lainie Kazan	Lainie Kazan
Nick Portokalos	Louis Mandylor	Louis Mandylor	Louis Mandylor	Louis Mandylor
Costas "Gus" Portokalos	Michael Constantine	Michael Constantine		Michael Constantine
Theia Voula	Andrea Martin	Andrea Martin	Andrea Martin	Andrea Martin
Nikki Portokalos	Gia Carides	Gia Carides	Gia Carides	Gia Carides
Uncle Taki	Gerry Mendicino	Gerry Mendicino	Gerry Mendicino	
Cousin Angelo	Joey Fatone	Joey Fatone	Joey Fatone	Joey Fatone
Mana-Yiayia	Bess Meisler	Bess Meisler		
Athena Portokalos	Stavroula Logothetis	Stavroula Logothetis	Stavroula Logothetis	
Mike	Ian Gomez	Ian Gomez		
Rodney Miller	Bruce Gray	Bruce Gray		
Harriet Miller	Fiona Reid	Fiona Reid		
Mrs. White	Jayne Eastwood	Jayne Eastwood	Jayne Eastwood	
Thiea Freida	Maria Vacratsis	Maria Vacratsis	Maria Vacratsis	
Yianni	Peter Tharos	Peter Tharos	Peter Tharos	
Jennie	Chrissy Paraskevopoulos	Chrissy Paraskevopoulos	Chrissy Paraskevopoulos	
Marianthi	Kathryn Haggis	Kathryn Haggis	Kathryn Haggis	
Ilaria		Jeanie Calleja	Jeanie Calleja	
Marge		Kathryn Greenwood	Kathryn Greenwood	
Edie		Tannis Burnett	Tannis Burnett	
Panos Portakalos		Mark Margolis		
George		John Stamos		
Anna		Rita Wilson		
Bennett		Alex Wolff		
Northwestern Rep		Rob Riggle		
Wedding Planner		Ashleigh Rains		
Patrick		Jeff White		
Aristotle			Elias Kacavas	
Victory			Melina Kotselou	

== Additional crew and production detail ==
Title	Crew/Detail					
Title	Composer(s)	Cinematographer	Editor(s)	Production companies	Distributing companies	Running time
My Big Fat Greek Wedding	Chris Wilson; Alexander Janko	Jeffrey Jur	Mia Goldman	HBO Films; Playtone Films; Gold Circle Films; MPH Entertainment	IFC Films	95 min
My Big Fat Greek Life	John Adair; Chris Wilson; Steve Hampton	Gil Hubbs	Barry L. Gold; Michael Karlich	Playtone Television; Brad Grey Television; Sony Pictures Television; Marsh McCall Productions	CBS; Sony Pictures Television	210 min (30min/episodes)
My Big Fat Greek Wedding 2	Christopher Lennertz	Jim Denault	Markus Czyzewski	HBO Films; Playtone Films; Gold Circle Films	Universal Pictures	94 min
My Big Fat Greek Wedding 3	Stephanie Economou	Barry Peterson	Annette Davey; Craig Herring	HBO Films; Focus Features; Gold Circle Films; The Playtone Company	Focus Features	92 min

== Reception ==
=== Box office performance ===
Film	Release date	Box office gross				Box office ranking		Budget	Ref(s)
Film	Release date	United States opening weekend	North America	Other territories	Worldwide	All time North America	All time worldwide	Budget	Ref(s)
My Big Fat Greek Wedding	April 19, 2002	$3,002,241	$241,438,208	$127,305,836	$368,744,044	#173	#422	$5 million	
My Big Fat Greek Wedding 2	March 25, 2016	$17,861,950	$59,689,605	$30,943,036	$90,632,641	#1,592	#2,069	$18 million	
My Big Fat Greek Wedding 3	September 8, 2023	$10,028,675	$28,496,030	$10,335,046	$38,831,076	#3,175	#3,849	—N/a	
Totals			$329,623,843	$168,583,918	$498,207,761			$23 million	

=== Critical and public response ===
Film	Critical		Public
Film	Rotten Tomatoes	Metacritic	CinemaScore
My Big Fat Greek Wedding	76% (130 reviews)	62/100 (29 reviews)	A–
My Big Fat Greek Life	—N/a	40/100 (13 reviews)	—N/a
My Big Fat Greek Wedding 2	27% (176 reviews)	37/100 (32 reviews)	A−
My Big Fat Greek Wedding 3	30% (76 reviews)	34/100 (23 reviews)	B
