= Michael Constantine =

American actor (1927–2021)

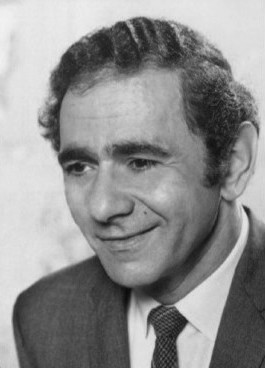
- Constantine in Room 222 in 1969
- Born: Gus Efstratiou; May 22, 1927; Reading, Pennsylvania, U.S.
- Died: August 31, 2021 (aged 94); Reading, Pennsylvania, U.S.
- Resting place: Charles Evans Cemetery
- Occupation: Actor
- Years active: 1953–2016
- Known for: Seymour Kaufman in Room 222 (1969–1974); Gus Portakalos in the My Big Fat Greek Wedding franchise (2002–2016)
- Spouses: Julianna McCarthy (m. 1953; div. 1972); Kathleen Patricia Christopherson (m. 1974; div. 1980)
- Children: 2

Michael Constantine (born Gus Efstratiou (or Ευστρατίου); May 22, 1927 – August 31, 2021) was a Greek-American actor. He is most widely recognized for his portrayal of Kostas "Gus" Portokalos, the stubborn Greek father of Toula Portokalos (Nia Vardalos), in the film My Big Fat Greek Wedding (2002). For his performance, Constantine won a Satellite Award for Best Supporting Actor – Musical or Comedy.

Early in his career, Constantine earned acclaim for his television work, especially as the long-suffering high school principal, Seymour Kaufman, on ABC's comedy-drama, Room 222, for which he won the Primetime Emmy Award for Outstanding Supporting Actor in a Comedy Series in 1970; he was again recognized by the Emmy Awards, as well as the Golden Globe Awards, the following year. After the conclusion of Room 222, Constantine portrayed night court magistrate Matthew J. Sirota on the 1976 sitcom Sirota's Court, receiving his second Golden Globe nomination. Constantine reprised his role as Gus Portokalos in My Big Fat Greek Wedding 2 (2016).

== Early life ==
Michael Constantine was born Gus Efstratiou on May 22, 1927, in Reading, Pennsylvania. He was the son of Andromache (née Fotiadou) and Theocharis Ioannides Efstratiou (a steel worker), both immigrants from Greece.

== Career ==
He began his career on the New York stage in the mid-1950s as understudy to Paul Muni in Inherit the Wind.

He studied acting with such prominent mentors as Howard Da Silva and played character roles on and off Broadway in his mid-twenties, supplementing his income as a night watchman and shooting-gallery barker. In 1959, he appeared in his first film, The Last Mile (1959). He had a small but memorable supporting role in The Hustler (1961). In 1964 and 1965, Constantine appeared on Perry Mason, first as wannabe private eye Dillard in "The Case of the Blonde Bonanza", and then as Pappy Ryan in "The Case of the Runaway Racer". In 1965, Constantine was cast as the historical John Chisum in the episode "Paid in Full", on the syndicated television anthology series Death Valley Days. He also appeared in another 1965 Death Valley Days episode "The Great Turkey War". In 1967, he appeared in the first part of "The Judgment", the two-episode conclusion of The Fugitive, starring David Janssen. Constantine played a long-suffering anti-organized-crime agent in Walt Disney's caper film The North Avenue Irregulars (1979), where he appeared alongside Edward Herrmann and Cloris Leachman. He also played an organized crime mobster who worked for Frank Nitti in the television version of The Untouchables. In 1988, he played the estranged father of one of the main characters in Friday the 13th: the Series.

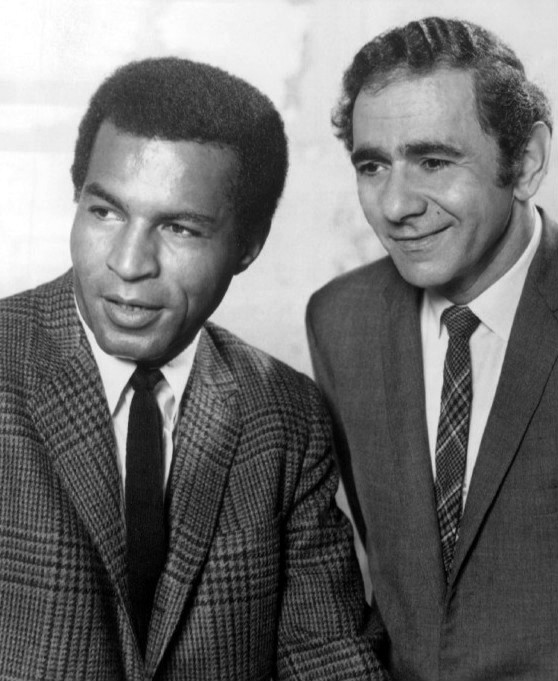
Lloyd Haynes and Michael Constantine in Room 222 in 1969

He played Santa Claus in Prancer (1989). In 1993, Constantine appeared in the independent drama Question of Faith, starring Anne Archer and Sam Neill. He played Tadzu Lempke in Stephen King's Thinner (1996). In 2002, he enjoyed an unexpected comeback as the Windex-toting Gus Portokalos in the hit movie My Big Fat Greek Wedding, a role he reprised on the short-lived television series My Big Fat Greek Life, and a sequel film with the original cast, My Big Fat Greek Wedding 2, which was released on March 25, 2016, which ended up being his final major acting role of any kind. In 2023's My Big Fat Greek Wedding 3, his character was revealed to have died before the events of the film.

== Personal life ==
On October 5, 1953, Constantine married actor Julianna McCarthy, whom he met while in the cast of Inherit the Wind. They had two children, Thea Eileen and Brendan Neil. The marriage ended in divorce in 1972, the same year that Constantine began his role on Room 222. He married Kathleen Christopher in 1974 and they divorced in 1980.

== Death ==
Constantine died at his home in Reading, Pennsylvania, on August 31, 2021, at age 94, from natural causes. My Big Fat Greek Wedding 3, which was released two years after his death, was dedicated to his memory alongside Constantine Vardalos (Nia Vardalos' father) and Bruce Gray (who plays Ian Miller's father, Rodney, in the films).

== Filmography ==
=== Film ===
Year	Title	Role	Notes
1959	The Last Mile	Ed Warner, Convict	
1961	The Hustler	John 'Big John'	
1963	Island of Love	Andy	
1964	Quick, Before It Melts	Mikhail Drozhensky	
1966	Hawaii	Mason	
1966	Beau Geste	Rostov	
1968	Skidoo	'Leech'	
1968	In Enemy Country	Ladislov	
1969	Justine	Memlik Pasha	
1969	If It's Tuesday, This Must Be Belgium	Jack Harmon	
1969	Don't Drink the Water	Commissar Krojack	
1969	The Reivers	Mr. Binford	
1972	Deadly Harvest	Stefan Groza	TV movie
1974	Death Cruise	Dr. Burke	TV movie
1975	The Night That Panicked America	Jess Wingate	TV movie
1976	Voyage of the Damned	Luis Clasing	
1976	Peeper	Anglich	
1978	Summer of My German Soldier	Harry Bergen	TV movie
1978	The Pirate	Yashir	TV movie
1979	The North Avenue Irregulars	Marvin 'Marv' Fogleman	
1979	Crisis in Mid-Air	Frank Piovano	TV movie
1983	The Forty Days of Musa Dagh	Talaat Pasha	
1985	Pray for Death	Newman	
1987	In the Mood	Mr. Wisecarver	
1989	Prancer	Mr. Stewart	
1991	By a Thread	Unknown	
1993	Question of Faith	Unknown	
1993	My Life	Bill Ivanovich	
1993	Deadfall	Frank	
1996	The Juror	Judge Weitzel	
1996	Thinner	Tadzu Lempke	
2002	My Big Fat Greek Wedding	Gus Portokalos	Satellite Award for Best Supporting Actor – Motion Picture; Nominated – Screen Actors Guild Award for Outstanding Performance by a Cast in a Motion Picture; Nominated – Teen Choice Award for Choice Movie Hissy Fit
2016	My Big Fat Greek Wedding 2	Gus Portokalos	

=== Television ===
- Brenner (1 episode, 1959)
- Target: The Corruptors! (1 episode), 1961
- The Untouchables (5 episodes, 1961–1963)
- The Lloyd Bridges Show (2 episodes, 1962–1963)
- The Eleventh Hour as Dr. Jamison in episode "And God Created Vanity" (1963)
- The Dakotas as Marshak in "Trouble at French Creek" (1963)
- Channing (1 episode, 1963) as Nick in "No Wild Games for Sophie" (1963)
- Gunsmoke (2 episodes, 1963–1968)
- The Twilight Zone (1 episode, 1964) as Sheriff Koch in "I Am the Night Color Me Black"
- Slattery's People (1964) one episode as Hungerford in "Remember The Dark Sins of Youth?"
- Perry Mason (2 episodes, 1964–1965)
- The Outer Limits (episode 46 "Counterweight", 1964)
- My Favorite Martian (TV series) (2 episodes, 1965–1966)
- Profiles in Courage (2 episodes, 1964)
- The Virginian (1 episode, 1965)
- Voyage to the Bottom of the Sea – The Indestructible Man (1 episode 1965)
- The Fugitive (3 episodes, 1965–1967) (Ernie Svoboda, Ben Wyckoff, Arthur Art Howe)
- I Spy (2 episodes, 1966)
- 12 O'Clock High (1 episode, 1966)
- The Road West in episode "To Light a Candle" (series, 1966)
- The Dick Van Dyke Show (1 episode, 1966)
- The Jean Arthur Show (2 episodes as Carnella, 1966)
- Hogan's Heroes (1 episode, 1966) as Heinrich -episode- "It Takes a Thief...Sometimes"
- Hey Landlord (series, 1966–1967)
- Combat! (as Jacques Patron, episode "Entombed", 1967)
- Dundee and the Culhane (1 episode, 1967 series)
- The Invaders (1 episode, 1968)
- The Flying Nun (as Juan, episode "Sister Lucky", 1968)
- Mission: Impossible (1 episode, 1969) (Nikor Janos)
- Room 222 Series – Seymour Kaufman (1969–1974)
- Bonanza (as a new settler whose greedy neighbor refuses him piped water for irrigation)
- The Odd Couple (series, 1970–1975)
- Mary Tyler Moore (1 episode, 1971)
- Night Gallery (1970–1973) 1 episode "The Boy Who Predicted Earthquakes".
- The Streets of San Francisco – Al Davies – in episode "A Wrongful Death" (series, 1973)
- Kojak (1 episode, 1974)
- The Krofft Supershow: Electra Woman and Dyna Girl (4 episodes, 1976) as The Sorcerer
- Sirota's Court (13 episodes, 1976–1977 series)
- 79 Park Avenue (miniseries, 1977)
- Roots: The Next Generations (miniseries, 1979)
- Quincy, M.E. (4 episodes) (1979 Season 4 Episodes 14 & 15 "Walk Softly Through the Night" Parts 1 and 2; Dr Arthur Clotti – 1981 Season 6, episode 14 "Seldom Silent, Never Heard"; 1983 Season 8 Episode 3 "Give Me Your Weak")
- Fantasy Island (1 episode, 1980)
- Benson 1982 season 4 episodes 1 & 2 as Marvin Musker
- The Love Boat (2 episodes, 1983)
- Amanda's (1 episode, 1983)
- Mama's Family (1 episode, 1983)
- The Fall Guy (1 episode, 1983)
- Remington Steele (3 episodes, 1984–1986)
- Simon & Simon (3 episodes, 1984–1988)
- Highway to Heaven (1 episode, 1985)
- Airwolf (1 episode, 1985)
- MacGyver (2 episodes, 1985–1987) – Inspector Jan Messic
- Murder, She Wrote (2 episodes, 1985–1988)
- Magnum, P.I. (1 episode, 1986)
- Friday the 13th: The Series ("Pipe Dream" 1988)
- Probe ("Plan 10 From Outer Space", 1988)
- Law & Order (2 episodes, 1992–1994)
- Cosby (1 episode, 1997)
- My Big Fat Greek Life (7 episodes, 2003)
- Cold Case (1 episode, 2007)

== Awards and nominations ==
Year	Association	Category	Production	Result
1970	Primetime Emmy Awards	Outstanding Performance by an Actor in a Supporting Role in Comedy	Room 222	Won
1971	Primetime Emmy Awards	Outstanding Performance by an Actor in a Supporting Role in Comedy	Room 222	Nominated
1971	Golden Globe Awards	Best Supporting Actor – Television	Room 222	Nominated
2003	Satellite Awards	Best Actor in a Supporting Role, Comedy or Musical	My Big Fat Greek Wedding	Won
