= Kirk Jones (director) =

English film director and screenwriter

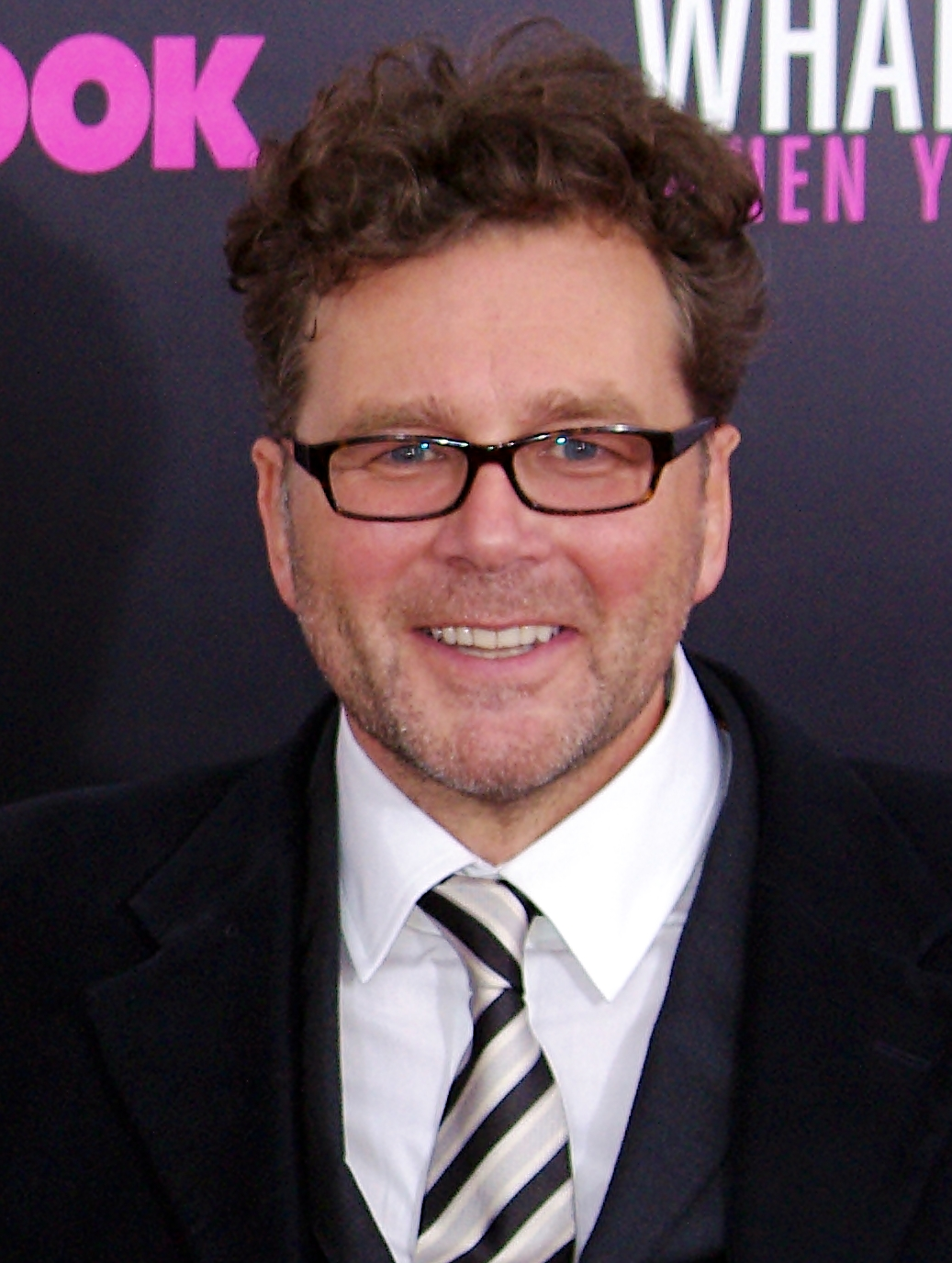
- Jones in May 2012
- Born: 31 October 1964 (age 62); Bristol, England, United Kingdom
- Occupations: Film director, screenwriter
- Years active: 1985-present

Kirk Jones (born 31 October 1964) is an English film director and screenwriter, known for the films Waking Ned (1998), Everybody's Fine (2009) and I Swear (2025).

== Early life and education ==
Kirk Jones was born in Bristol, England and grew up in Long Ashton, Somerset. He attended Backwell School and Filton Technical College. He went to Newport Film School (University of Wales College, Npt.), where he specialised in directing drama, comedy and television commercials, between 1985-87. He graduated after winning a National Student Film Award and started to work for London-based production company, BFCS as a production runner and later as assistant film editor.

== Career ==
Whilst working in the cutting room, he continued to write and direct his own films and after collecting a Silver award at the Creative Circle Awards for his Mercedes commercial which he wrote and directed in 1990, he was invited to join Xenium Productions as a director. His Absolut Vodka film, which he wrote and directed, was awarded a Silver in 1991 and Jones began directing commercials full-time in London, Europe and the US, working for agencies including Saatchi & Saatchi, Bartle, Bogle and Hegarty and Mother. Jones's producer, Glynis Murray set up Tomboy Films in 1991 and he joined her soon after. Awards at NABS in 1994 and a Silver at the Creative Circle Awards followed, and Jones continued to direct more than one hundred commercials for clients including The National Lottery, Reebok, National Westminster Bank, HSBC, Coca Cola etc. His campaign for Heinz won a Silver Lion at Cannes in ’96 (Best Campaign) and his Reebok campaign won awards at both The Creative Circle and the British TV Advertising Awards in 1998.

In 1995, Jones started to write what would become his first feature film, Waking Ned, which he directed in 1998. He was nominated for a BAFTA at the Film awards as "Best Newcomer" for his first feature film. Proportionate to budget, Waking Ned was the second-highest-grossing film in the world in 1999, behind The Blair Witch Project, and won awards in the U.S and Europe including: New York Comedy Film Festival (Best Feature, Grand Jury and Critics Prize. Best Feature at Comedy d'Alp in France and Audience Award for Best Feature at Paris Film Festival.

In 2005, Jones directed his second feature film, Nanny McPhee, for Working Title and Universal Pictures. Starring Emma Thompson and Colin Firth, it was one of the year's ten highest-grossing films in the UK, with $29 million, and grossed $123 million worldwide. In 2008, Jones wrote and directed his third film, Everybody's Fine. Starring Robert De Niro, Drew Barrymore, Kate Beckinsale and Sam Rockwell, released through Miramax in 2009 and Disney worldwide in 2010. In 2012, Jones directed Cameron Diaz, Jennifer Lopez, Chris Rock, and Anna Kendrick in the romantic comedy What to Expect When You're Expecting through Lionsgate. In 2016, Jones directed a sequel to the 2002 film My Big Fat Greek Wedding entitled My Big Fat Greek Wedding 2 which was produced by Tom Hanks, Rita Wilson, Gary Goetzman, Paul Brooks, and Nia Vardalos.

He wrote and directed the BAFTA-winning film I Swear (2025), a biopic of the Tourette syndrome campaigner John Davidson. It was nominated for six awards at the 79th British Academy Film Awards and took home three, including Best Actor and Rising Star for Robert Aramayo.

In March 2026, it was announced that Jones would direct a live action adaptation based on the children’s book and animated TV series Mr Benn, with filming expected to start in early 2027.

== Filmography ==
Year	Title	Director	Writer
1998	Waking Ned	Yes	Yes
2005	Nanny McPhee	Yes	No
2009	Everybody's Fine	Yes	Yes
2012	What to Expect When You're Expecting	Yes	No
2016	My Big Fat Greek Wedding 2	Yes	No
2025	I Swear	Yes	Yes

== Awards ==
- 1998 Critic's choice Award (Ft. Lauderdale International Film Festival) for Waking Ned
- 1998 Best Feature Award (New York Comedy Festival) for Waking Ned
- 1999 Sir Tim Award (Marco Island Film Festival) for Waking Ned
- 1999 Public Prize (Paris Film Festival) for Waking Ned
- 2000 Guild Film Award - Gold (Guild of German Art House Cinemas) for Waking Ned
- 2000 BAFTA Carl Foreman Award for the Most Promising Newcomer
