= John Corbett =

American actor and country music singer (born 1961)

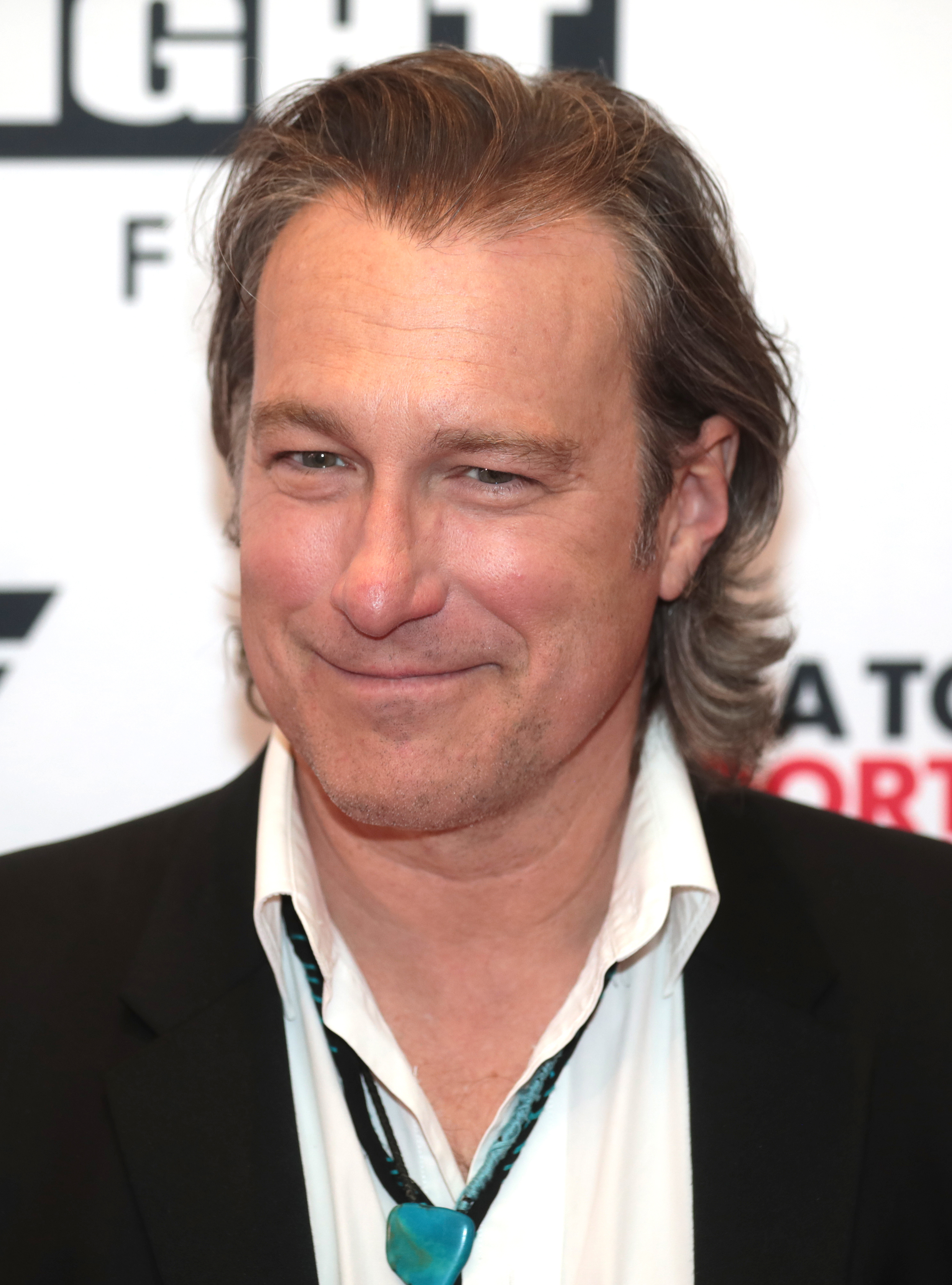
- Corbett in 2019
- Born: John Joseph Corbett Jr. May 9, 1961 (age 65); Wheeling, West Virginia, U.S.
- Occupations: Actor; singer; musician
- Years active: 1987–present
- Spouse: Bo Derek (m. 2020)

John Joseph Corbett Jr. (born May 9, 1961) is an American actor and singer. On television, he is best known for his roles as Chris Stevens on Northern Exposure (1990–1995), Aidan Shaw on Sex and the City (2000–2003) and sequel series And Just Like That... (2023–2025), Max Gregson on United States of Tara (2009–2011), and Seth Holt on Parenthood (2011–2015). In film, he is known for roles in the My Big Fat Greek Wedding franchise, Raising Helen (2004), The Messengers (2007), Sex and the City 2 (2010), Ramona & Beezus (2010), and the To All the Boys film trilogy (2018–2021).

In addition to acting, Corbett has pursued a career in country music, releasing the studio albums John Corbett (2006) and Leaving Nothin' Behind (2013) with the former reaching number 45 on the Billboard Country Albums chart.

== Early life ==
Corbett was raised in Wheeling, West Virginia, U.S. He grew up in an apartment block near the Ohio River with his mother and stepfather, both of whom worked at his uncle Phillip's music club. Corbett was raised Catholic, and was an altar boy for seven years at St. Joseph's Cathedral. His father was raised in Bellaire, Ohio, and was a Jehovah's Witness. Corbett's mother was Jewish through her father who was of Russian-Jewish descent.

Corbett started playing the guitar at age seven, and at 16, he worked as a security guard at the Capitol Music Hall. He attended Wheeling Central Catholic High School, from which he graduated in 1979.

Following his graduation from high school, Corbett moved to Bellflower, California to live with his father and stepmother, and worked for Kaiser Steel in Fontana for six years. During his time as a hydrotester in the factory, he spent a year training to become an L.A. County Deputy Sheriff, but ultimately failed the exams. Corbett stopped working at the factory after injuring his back; he subsequently enrolled in hairdressing classes at Cerritos College in Norwalk, and also studied acting there. Corbett said, "I went to hair school by day and studied theatre at night." He has been a licensed hair stylist since 1986. He then landed a Samsung commercial, and after three years, had starred in 50 national commercials.

== Career ==
=== Acting ===
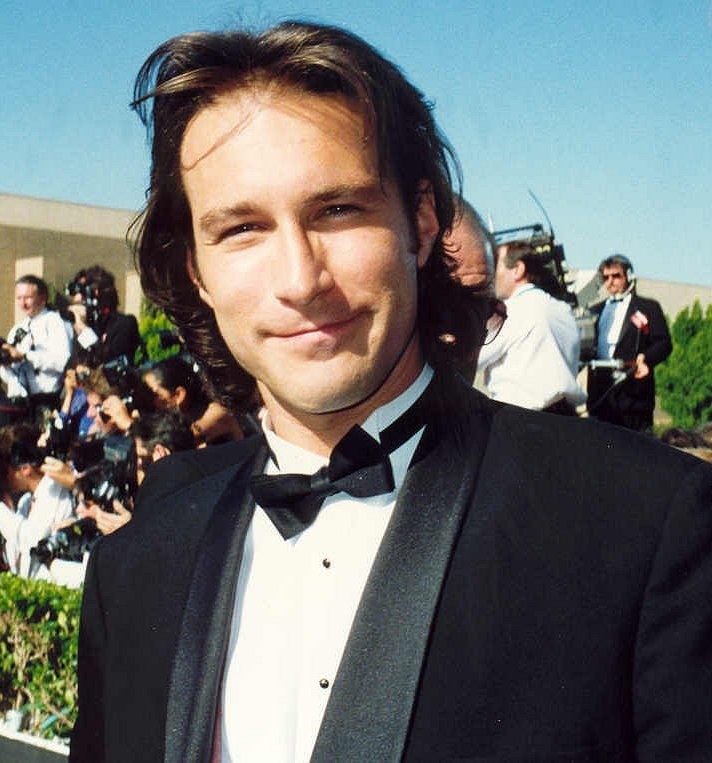
Corbett at the 44th Primetime Emmy Awards in August 1992

Corbett's first role came in 1988, when he was cast as Louis, the hippie boyfriend of Karen Arnold (Olivia d'Abo) in the first season of ABC's comedy-drama series The Wonder Years. For this appearance, he was credited as Jack Corbett. From 1990 to 1995, he starred as Chris Stevens in the CBS comedy-drama series Northern Exposure, for which he was nominated for the Golden Globe Award for Best Supporting Actor – Series, Miniseries or Television Film and the Primetime Emmy Award for Outstanding Supporting Actor in a Drama Series.

Corbett played the leading role of Adam MacArthur, in 1997's short-lived Fox science fiction series The Visitor, for which he was nominated for the Saturn Award for Best Actor on Television. His character, who was abducted by aliens, finds his way back to Earth 50 years later, endowed with special powers. From 2001 to 2002, he portrayed the love interest of Carrie Bradshaw (Sarah Jessica Parker), Aidan Shaw, in the HBO comedy series Sex and the City, for which he received his second nomination for the Golden Globe Award for Best Supporting Actor – Series, Miniseries or Television Film. In 2001, he also had a supporting role in the romantic comedy film Serendipity, starring John Cusack and Kate Beckinsale. In 2002, Corbett portrayed the male lead role of Ian Miller in the romantic comedy film My Big Fat Greek Wedding, alongside Nia Vardalos (who also wrote the screenplay), for which he was nominated for a Screen Actors Guild Award.

In 2003, he starred in the FX dark comedy series Lucky, as professional poker player Michael "Lucky" Linkletter. The following year, he starred alongside Kate Hudson in Garry Marshall's comedy-drama film Raising Helen. He then portrayed music teacher Mr. Torvald in the 2004 musical drama film Raise Your Voice, co-starring Hilary Duff. Three years later, he had a starring role in the Pang brothers horror film The Messengers (2007). Additionally, Corbett starred in the 2007 Lifetime television film Montana Sky, and co-starred as a corrupt LAPD vice squad member in the 2008 David Ayer-directed crime thriller Street Kings. The following year, he reunited with his My Big Fat Greek Wedding co-star Nia Vardalos for the romantic comedy I Hate Valentine's Day (2009), which Vardalos also wrote and directed. In 2009, he also co-starred in the Brian Herzlinger-directed comedy film Baby on Board.

From 2009 to 2011, Corbett co-starred in the Showtime comedy-drama series United States of Tara as Max Gregson, the husband of Toni Collette's title character. In 2010, Corbett reprised his role as Aidan Shaw in the Sex and the City feature film sequel Sex and the City 2. That same year, he starred as Tom Marks in the Hallmark seasonal television film November Christmas, alongside Sam Elliott and Sarah Paulson, and portrayed Robert Quimby in Elizabeth Allen Rosenbaum's family comedy film Ramona and Beezus, based on the Ramona novel series. Corbett was inducted into the Academy of Motion Picture Arts and Sciences in June 2011.

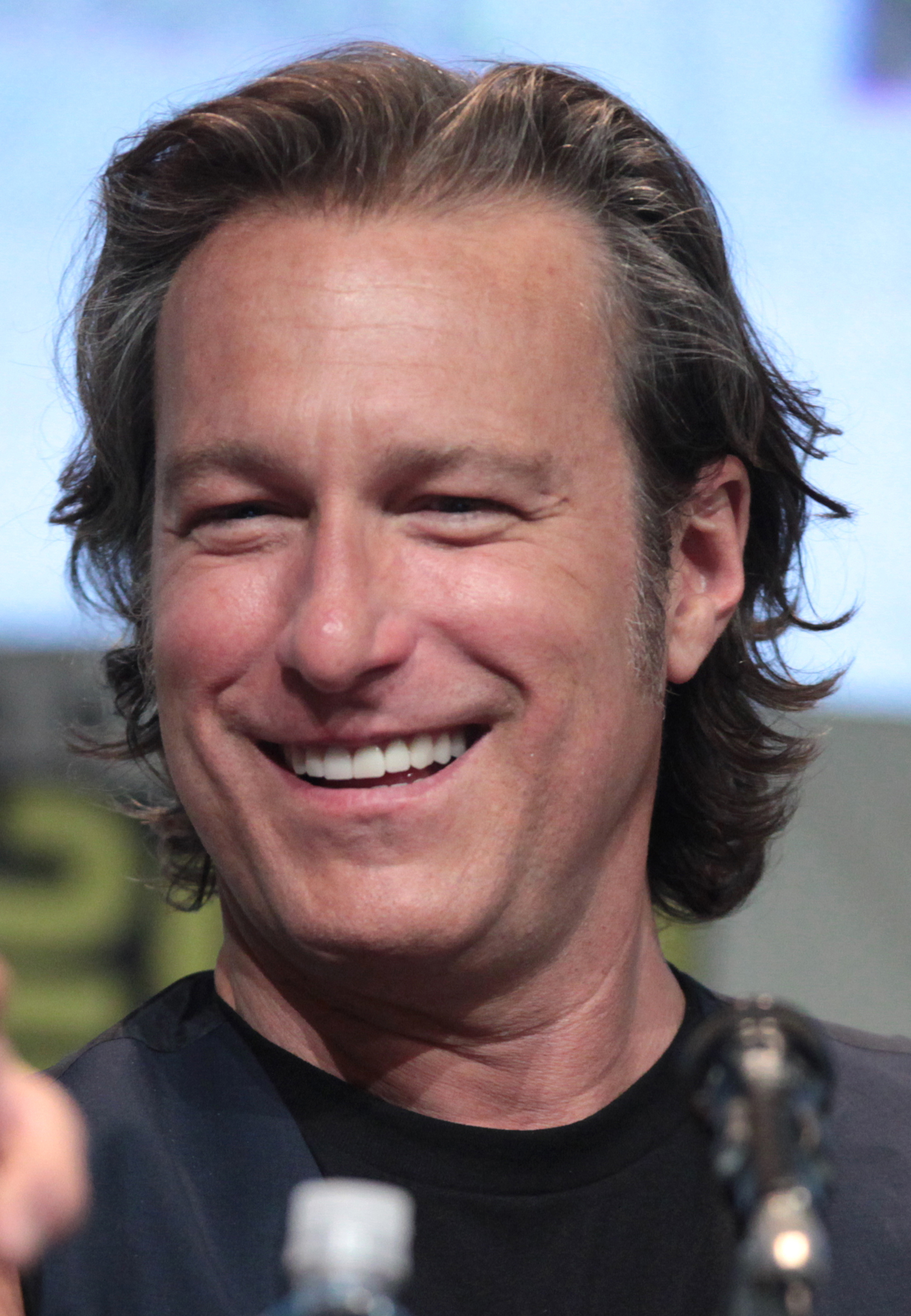
Corbett at San Diego Comic-Con in July 2015

From 2011 to 2015, he had a recurring role as Seth Holt on the NBC drama series Parenthood. In March 2013, Corbett appeared in two episodes of the CBS procedural drama series NCIS: Los Angeles as Special Agent Roy Haines; it was considered to be a planted pilot episode for a spin-off series focusing on his character, but this was ultimately not produced. In 2012, he portrayed teacher Mike Kersjes in the Hallmark television film based on the memoir of the same name, A Smile as Big as the Moon. Corbett provided the voiceover for Applebee's television commercials and, since 2012, has been the voice for Walgreens' television and radio advertisements. In 2014, Corbett appeared alongside Sarah Bolger in Jeff Probst's drama film Kiss Me. The following year, he starred as Garrett Peterson, opposite Jennifer Lopez, in the Rob Cohen-directed erotic thriller The Boy Next Door.

From 2015 to 2016, he portrayed Josiah "Flash" Bacon in the FX comedy series Sex & Drugs & Rock & Roll. In 2016, fourteen years after My Big Fat Greek Wedding was released, Corbett returned for the sequel My Big Fat Greek Wedding 2. In 2017, he portrayed the main role of Michael Spurlock, a pastor who welcomes Karen refugees to his church, in the Steve Gomer-directed drama film All Saints. Corbett then had a guest starring role as himself in the eighth and final season of IFC's comedy series Portlandia. He portrayed Dr. Dan Covey, the father of Lana Condor's lead character, in the film adaptation of Jenny Han's novel To All the Boys I've Loved Before (2018), directed by Susan Johnson. Corbett starred in God's Not Dead: A Light in Darkness (2018), as lawyer Pearce Hill.

In 2019, Corbett starred in John R. Leonetti's film adaptation of Tim Lebbon's horror novel The Silence, with Miranda Otto and Stanley Tucci. He also co-starred with Nia Long in the horror sequel 47 Meters Down: Uncaged. In 2023 he reprised his role as Aidan Shaw in the Sex and the City reboot And Just Like That...

=== Music ===
In 1993, Corbett starred in the Jeff Richter-directed music video for the Scorpions single "Woman", opposite Karina Lombard.

In September 2004, it was reported that Corbett had signed a recording contract with Nashville-based country music label Broken Bow Records. He released his self-titled debut album, co-produced by D. Scott Miller and Tara Novick, on April 4, 2006, and went on tour with ZZ Top, Lisa Marie Presley, and Charlie Daniels to promote the record. The album's only single, "Good to Go", debuted at No. 48 on the Billboard Hot Country Songs chart, which was the highest debut by a new artist from an independent label, and later peaked at No. 43. The music video for "Good to Go" was directed by Kevin Kerslake. The album itself reached No. 45 on the Country Albums chart, and peaked at No. 21 on the Independent Albums chart. In 2008, Corbett was featured in Trisha Yearwood's music video for her single "This Is Me You're Talking To". Seven years after his debut, Corbett released a second country album, Leaving Nothin' Behind, produced by Jon Randall, on January 29, 2013.

== Personal life ==
Corbett was raised Catholic and "dabbled" in born-again Christianity in the 1980s "before returning to his Catholic roots." He has been in a relationship with actress Bo Derek since 2002, after meeting on a blind date. They married in December 2020. The couple live on a ranch in Santa Ynez, California.

== Filmography ==
=== Film ===
| Year | Title | Role | Notes |
|---|---|---|---|
| 1991 | Flight of the Intruder | "Big Augie" | |
| 1993 | Tombstone | Johnny Barnes | |
| 1996 | Wedding Bell Blues | Cary Maynard Philco | |
| 1997 | Volcano | Norman Calder | |
| 2000 | Dinner Rush | Ken Roloff | |
| 2000 | Desperate but Not Serious | Jonathan Silver | |
| 2001 | Prancer Returns | Tom Sullivan | |
| 2001 | Serendipity | Lars Hammond | |
| 2002 | My Big Fat Greek Wedding | Ian Miller | |
| 2003 | My Dinner with Jimi | Henry Diltz | |
| 2004 | Raising Helen | Dan Parker | |
| 2004 | Elvis Has Left the Building | Miles Taylor | |
| 2004 | Raise Your Voice | Mr. Torvald | |
| 2005 | Bigger Than the Sky | Michael Degan | |
| 2005 | Magnificent Desolation: Walking on the Moon 3D | Jack Schmitt (voice) | Documentary short |
| 2006 | Dreamland | Henry | |
| 2007 | The Messengers | John Burwell | |
| 2008 | Street Kings | Detective Dante Demille | |
| 2008 | The Burning Plain | John | |
| 2009 | Baby on Board | Danny Chambers | |
| 2009 | I Hate Valentine's Day | Greg Gatlin | |
| 2010 | Sex and the City 2 | Aidan Shaw | |
| 2010 | Ramona and Beezus | Robert Quimby | |
| 2014 | Kiss Me | Chance | |
| 2014 | The Lookalike | Bobby Zan | |
| 2015 | The Boy Next Door | Garrett Peterson | |
| 2016 | My Big Fat Greek Wedding 2 | Ian Miller | |
| 2016 | My Dead Boyfriend | Primo Schultz | |
| 2017 | All Saints | Michael Spurlock | |
| 2018 | God's Not Dead: A Light in Darkness | Pearce Hill | |
| 2018 | To All the Boys I've Loved Before | Dr. Dan Covey | |
| 2019 | The Silence | Glenn | |
| 2019 | Gully | Mr. Charlie | |
| 2019 | 47 Meters Down: Uncaged | Grant | |
| 2020 | To All the Boys: P.S. I Still Love You | Dr. Dan Covey | |
| 2021 | To All the Boys: Always and Forever | Dr. Dan Covey | |
| 2023 | My Big Fat Greek Wedding 3 | Ian Miller | |
| 2025 | Soul on Fire | Dennis | |

=== Television ===
| Year | Title | Role | Notes |
|---|---|---|---|
| 1988 | The Wonder Years | Louis | Episode: "Angel" |
| 1990–1995 | Northern Exposure | Chris Stevens | 110 episodes |
| 1995–1996 | Days of Our Lives | Hospital Administrator | 4 episodes |
| 1996 | Innocent Victims | Tim Hennis | Television film |
| 1996 | Don't Look Back | Morgan Rose | Television film |
| 1996 | The Morrison Murders | Walker Morrison | Television film |
| 1997–1998 | The Visitor | Adam MacArthur | 13 episodes |
| 1998 | The Warlord: Battle for the Galaxy | Justin Thorpe | Television film |
| 1999 | The Sky's On Fire | Dr. Evan Thorne | Television film |
| 2000 | On Hostile Ground | Matt Andrews | Television film |
| 2000–2003 | Sex and the City | Aidan Shaw | 22 episodes |
| 2001 | Private Lies | David | Television film |
| 2003 | Lucky | Michael Linkletter | 13 episodes |
| 2003 | Gary the Rat | Frank Spillogotoriettio (voice) | Episode: "This Is Not a Pipe" |
| 2005 | Hunt for Justice | Captain John Tanner | Television film |
| 2007 | Montana Sky | Ben McKinnon | Television film |
| 2009–2011 | United States of Tara | Max Gregson | 36 episodes |
| 2010 | November Christmas | Tom Marks | Television film |
| 2011–2015 | Parenthood | Seth Holt | 10 episodes |
| 2011 | Glenn Martin, DDS | Jim "Big Jim" (voice) | Episode: "Glenn and the Art of Motorcycle Maintenance" |
| 2011 | Ricochet | Duncan Hatcher | Television film |
| 2011 | Hunt for the I-5 Killer | Dave Kominek | Television film |
| 2012 | A Smile as Big as the Moon | Mike Kersjes | Television film |
| 2013 | NCIS: Los Angeles | Roy Haines | 2 episodes |
| 2015–2016 | Sex & Drugs & Rock & Roll | Josiah Bacon | Main role |
| 2016–2017 | Still the King | Trayne Crowstown | 4 episodes |
| 2017 | Mata Hari | Rudolph McCloud | 4 episodes |
| 2018 | Portlandia | John Corbett | Episode: "Peter Follows P!nk" |
| 2018 | Undone | Layton Hollingsworth | 3 episodes |
| 2021 | Rebel | Grady Bello | Main role |
| 2023 | How I Met Your Father | Robert | 3 episodes |
| 2023 | XO, Kitty | Dr. Dan Covey | 2 episodes |
| 2023–2025 | And Just Like That... | Aidan Shaw | Recurring role (seasons 2–3) |
| 2026 | The Hunting Party | Xander Wax | Episode: "Xander Wax" |

== Discography ==
=== Albums ===
| Title | Album details | Peak chart positions | | |
| Title | Album details | US Country | US Heat | US Indie |
|---|---|---|---|---|
| John Corbett | Release date: April 4, 2006; Label: Fun Bone/Co5 | 45 | 19 | 21 |
| Leaving Nothin' Behind | Release date: February 5, 2013; Label: Fun Bone/Co5 | — | — | — |
"—" denotes releases that did not chart

=== Singles ===
| Year | Single | Peak positions | Album |
| Year | Single | US Country | Album |
|---|---|---|---|
| 2005 | "Bottle Of Whiskey" | ― | John Corbett |
| 2005 | "Good to Go" | 43 | John Corbett |

=== Music videos ===
| Year | Title | Artist | Director | Ref. |
|---|---|---|---|---|
| 1993 | "Woman" | Scorpions | Jeff Richter | |
| 2005 | "Bottle of Whiskey" | Himself | Kevin Kerslake | |
| 2006 | "Good to Go" | Himself | Kevin Kerslake | |
| 2008 | "This Is Me You're Talking To" | Trisha Yearwood | Trey Fanjoy | |

== Awards and nominations ==
| Year | Award | Category | Work | Result |
|---|---|---|---|---|
| 1992 | Primetime Emmy Award | Outstanding Supporting Actor in a Drama Series | Northern Exposure | Nominated |
| 1993 | Golden Globe Award | Best Supporting Actor – Series, Miniseries or Television Film | Northern Exposure | Nominated |
| 1995 | Screen Actors Guild Award | Outstanding Performance by an Ensemble in a Comedy Series | Northern Exposure | Nominated |
| 1998 | Saturn Award | Best Actor on Television | The Visitor | Nominated |
| 2002 | Golden Globe Award | Best Supporting Actor – Series, Miniseries or Television Film | Sex and the City | Nominated |
| 2003 | Screen Actors Guild Award | Outstanding Performance by a Cast in a Motion Picture | My Big Fat Greek Wedding | Nominated |
| 2006 | Method Fest Independent Film Festival | Best Supporting Actor | Dreamland | Won |
| 2011 | Prism Award | Outstanding Performance in a Comedy Series | United States of Tara | Nominated |
