= Maria Vacratsis =

Canadian actress

- Born: July 28, 1955 (age 70); Canada
- Occupation: Actress
- Years active: 1989-present

Maria Vacratsis (born July 28, 1955) is a Canadian actress.

== Career ==
Vacratsis has been featured in several Canadian television series, including Degrassi: The Next Generation, Little Mosque on the Prairie, Tactical Girls, and Rent-a-Goalie. In addition to her work on television, she has appeared with Chris Farley and David Spade in the 1995 film Tommy Boy and as Aunt Frieda in the My Big Fat Greek Wedding franchise (2002-2023). She also voiced Queen Metaria (aka Negaforce) in the original English dub of Sailor Moon.

== Filmography ==
=== Film ===
Year	Title	Role	Notes
1989	Destiny to Order	Lisa	
1995	Tommy Boy	Helen	
1995	The Michelle Apartments	Hotel Manager	
1997	Hayseed	Auntie Prudence	
1999	Judgment Day: The Ellie Nesler Story	Driver's Public Defender	
2002	My Big Fat Greek Wedding	Aunt Freida	
2007	Shoot 'Em Up	Pawnshop Owner	
2009	Saturday	Maria	
2014	Guidance	Mrs. Kim	
2015	88	Sally	
2015	A Date with Miss Fortune	Señora Maria	
2015	The Rainbow Kid	Meredith	
2016	My Big Fat Greek Wedding 2	Aunt Freida	
2018	Mamma Mia! Here We Go Again	Sofia	
2019	Heavy	Grandmother	
2019	Canadian Strain	Barbara Banting	
2023	My Big Fat Greek Wedding 3	Aunt Frieda	

=== Television ===
Year	Title	Role	Notes
1984	Hangin' In	Mrs. Kaplan	Episode: "Oy Vey, Mike's Going Away"
1985	Night Heat	Union Goon	Episode: "Poison"
1985	Turning to Stone	Inmate	Television film
1985	The Boys from Syracuse	Corporal	Television film
1986	Four on the Floor	Various roles	10 episodes
1987	Street Legal	Judge Feldman	Episode: "Desperate Alibi"
1988	Katts and Dog	Woman	Episode: "Hostages"
1991	E.N.G.	Patty	Episode: "Tyger, Tyger"
1993	Candles, Snow and Mistletoe	Wife	Television film
1994	Dan Redican Comedy Hour	Various roles	Television film
1994	The Mighty Jungle	Jerry	2 episodes
1994	Sodbusters	Beth Poulet	Television film
1994–1995	Ready or Not	Ms. Kozmuchka	3 episodes
1995	The Great Defender	Dimitria	Episode: "Pilot"
1995	The Shamrock Conspiracy	Mrs. Lombardo	Television film
1995	Choices of the Heart	Emma Goldman	Television film
1995	Side Effects	Magda Pantazzi	Episode: "Rust Proof"
1995–2000	Sailor Moon	Various roles	16 episodes
1996	Radiant City	Sylvia	Television film
1997	Due South	Charmain	Episode: "Eclipse"
1997	Wind at My Back	Mrs. Foster	Episode: "Never Sleep Three in a Bed"
1997	Major Crime	Mary Ann McInnis	Television film
1997-1998	Goosebumps	Janet / Big Edna	3 episodes
1998	Giving Up the Ghost	Maria	Television film
1998-1999	Mythic Warriors	Atropos / Hecate	2 episodes
1998; 2001	Made in Canada	J.W. Anderson	2 episodes
1999	Sealed with a Kiss	Mrs. Papaportiliou	Television film
2000	The Zack Files	Queen of Hearts	Episode: "Library of No Return"
2001	Leap Years	Aunt Blanca	Episode #1.18
2002	Guilt by Association	Old Lucy	Television film
2002	Odyssey 5	Elaine Wilkerson	Episode: "Pilot"
2002	Street Time	Receptionist	2 episodes
2002–2003	Degrassi: The Next Generation	Sheila	7 episodes
2002, 2004	Puppets Who Kill	Various roles	2 episodes
2003	Profoundly Normal	Hemlock Nurse	Television film
2004	Doc	Riker's Landlady	Episode: "Modelrageous"
2004	Sue Thomas: F.B.Eye	Aunt Hattie Roland	Episode: "Concrete Evidence"
2005	Slings & Arrows	Witch #1	3 episodes
2005	Odd Job Jack	Various roles	Episode: "A Christmas Coma"
2005	Sons of Butcher	Various roles	5 episodes
2006–2008	Rent-a-Goalie	Firstman	12 episodes
2007	Little Mosque on the Prairie	Mother Hamoudi	Episode: "Mother-in-Law"
2008	Testees	Hot Dog Lady	Episode: "Herfume"
2010	Lost Girl	Ms. Sizemore	Episode: "Dead Lucky"
2010	Being Erica	Joan	Episode: "Jenny from the Block"
2011	Skins	Brown Paw	Episode: "Abbud"
2011	Salem Falls	Delilah	Television film
2014	A Day Late and a Dollar Short	Esther	Television film
2014	Rick Mercer Report	Old Lady	Episode #12.3
2014	Murdoch Mysteries	Miss Glenys Moore	Episode: "The Keystone Constables"
2014	Guidestones	Olga Tarski	Episode: "A Small Tragedy"
2015	Rookie Blue	Warden Justine Ordower	Episode: "Uprising"
2015	Jesse Stone: Lost in Paradise	Animal Shelter Employee	Television film
2016	The ZhuZhus	Secretary	Episode: "Walter-Gate/Janitor Day"
2016	The Beaverton	Regina Thompson	Episode #1.2
2016–2018	Tactical Girls	The Boss	4 episodes
2017	Running with Violet	Daddy	5 episodes
2017	Schitt's Creek	Darlene's Cousin	Episode: "Friends & Family"
2017	Save Me	Luana	Episode: "Neck Trauma"
2017–2019	Hotel Transylvania: The Series	Additional voices	14 episodes
2019	Odd Squad	Nana Banana	Episode: "Odds and Ends"
2019	Boombats	Mrs. Scrota	2 episodes
2019	Diggstown	Olympia Laertes	Episode: "Renee Joy"
2020	Dino Dana	Grandma	17 episodes
2021	Big Blue	Krelly	2 episodes
2021–2022	Something Undone	Aunt Hannah	3 episodes
2022	The Kids in the Hall	Winnie	1 episode
