= My Big Fat Greek Wedding =

2002 film by Joel Zwick

- Theatrical release poster
- Directed by: Joel Zwick
- Written by: Nia Vardalos
- Produced by: Rita Wilson; Tom Hanks; Gary Goetzman
- Starring: Nia Vardalos; John Corbett; Lainie Kazan; Michael Constantine; Gia Carides; Louis Mandylor; Andrea Martin; Joey Fatone
- Cinematography: Jeffrey Jur
- Edited by: Mia Goldman
- Music by: Chris Wilson; Alexander Janko
- Production companies: Gold Circle Films; Home Box Office; MPH Entertainment; Playtone
- Distributed by: IFC Films (United States); Equinox Films (Canada)
- Release dates: February 22, 2002 (AFM); April 19, 2002 (United States)
- Running time: 95 minutes
- Countries: United States; Canada
- Language: English
- Budget: $5 million
- Box office: $368.7 million

My Big Fat Greek Wedding is a 2002 romantic comedy film directed by Joel Zwick and written by Nia Vardalos. It stars an ensemble cast led by Vardalos, John Corbett, Lainie Kazan, Michael Constantine, Gia Carides, Louis Mandylor, Andrea Martin, and Joey Fatone. It follows a young Greek-American woman who falls in love with a non-Greek man and struggles to get her family to accept him, while coming to terms with her heritage and cultural identity.

An international co-production between the United States and Canada, the film premiered at the American Film Market on February 22, 2002, and was theatrically released in the United States on April 19, by IFC Films. It received positive reviews from critics and was a box office success, grossing $368.7 million worldwide against its $5 million budget, becoming the ninth-highest-grossing film of 2002. At the 60th Golden Globe Awards, it earned two nominations: Best Motion Picture – Musical or Comedy and Best Actress in a Motion Picture – Musical or Comedy (for Vardalos). It was also nominated for Best Original Screenplay at the 75th Academy Awards, while Vardalos won Best Debut Performance at the 18th Independent Spirit Awards.

The film spawned a franchise, which inspired the 2003 sitcom My Big Fat Greek Life and the 2016 sequel My Big Fat Greek Wedding 2. A third film, titled My Big Fat Greek Wedding 3, was released in theaters on September 8, 2023.

== Plot ==
In Chicago, 30-year-old Fotoula "Toula" Portokalos is a member of a large, loud, overbearing Greek family. Her father, Costas "Gus" Portokalos, wants her to get married and have children as soon as possible. Toula lives with her parents and works at their restaurant, Dancing Zorba's, but longs to gain independence from her family.

One day, Toula finds herself attracted to Ian Miller, a high school teacher who is meeting a friend at Dancing Zorba's. That evening, she tells her parents she wants to take classes at the local college to learn about computers to help them run the restaurant, but Gus becomes distraught, thinking Toula intends to leave him. Toula's mother Maria comforts her and convinces Gus to agree to Toula's idea.

As the weeks pass, Toula gains more confidence and changes her image, switching her thick-framed glasses for contact lenses, styling her hair, and wearing makeup and brighter clothes that show her figure. After seeing a flyer for a class about computers and tourism, she suggests to her aunt Voula that she could take the class and apply what she learns to help Voula's travel agency. Voula agrees, and Toula and Maria covertly convince Gus to agree as well.

While Toula is working in the travel agency, Ian notices her and asks her out for dinner. On their date, she reveals to him that her family owns Dancing Zorba's; he suddenly remembers her and, contrary to Toula's fear that he would remember her as "frump girl", he remains interested. They continue dating and fall in love.

Knowing her family would disapprove of her dating a non-Greek, Toula lies about taking a pottery class as a cover to continue seeing Ian. However, she is exposed when a family friend sees them kissing in a parking lot. Gus is furious that Ian did not ask his permission to date Toula and forbids them from seeing each other. Despite Gus's efforts at introducing her to single Greek men, she continues to date Ian. Her brother Niko tells Toula she has inspired him to follow his passion and take art courses at night.

Ian proposes marriage and Toula accepts. Maria tells Gus that he must respect Toula's decision, but he remains upset because Ian is not a member of the Greek Orthodox Church. Ian agrees to be baptized into the church to persuade Toula's family to accept him.

Toula's family members constantly insert themselves into the wedding planning, designing ugly bridesmaid dresses and misspelling Ian's mother's name on the wedding invitations. Ian's quiet, conservative parents meet Toula's entire family during a loud and extravagant dinner, after which Gus is frustrated by the Millers' introverted and judgmental nature. Toula worries about whether her father has accepted Ian, but Maria reassures her that she and Gus came to the United States so Toula and her siblings could have the freedom Maria and Gus did not have as children.

At the wedding reception, Gus gives a heartfelt speech about how the differences in the newlyweds' backgrounds do not matter. He and Maria reveal that they have bought a house for Toula and Ian. As the two families dance together, Toula decides that while her family is loud and unconventional, she knows they love her and will always be there for her.

Six years later, Toula and Ian are living in the house Gus and Maria bought them, which is located right next door to the Portokalos' house. The couple walks their daughter Paris to her first day of Greek school.

== Cast ==
- Nia Vardalos as Fotoula "Toula" Portokalos
- John Corbett as Ian Miller, an English teacher
- Lainie Kazan as Maria Portokalos, Toula's mother
- Michael Constantine as Costas "Gus" Portokalos, Toula's father
- Andrea Martin as Aunt Voula, Maria's sister
- Louis Mandylor as Nikos "Nick" Portokalos, Toula's younger brother
- Gerry Mendicino as Uncle Taki, Voula's husband
- Joey Fatone as Cousin Angelo, Voula's son.
- Gia Carides as Cousin Nikki, Voula's daughter
- Bess Meisler as Yiayia, Gus's mother and Toula's grandmother who has PTSD
- Stavroula Logothettis as Athena Portokalos, Toula and Nick's older sister
- Ian Gomez as Mike, Ian's best friend
- Bruce Gray as Rodney Miller, Ian's father
- Fiona Reid as Harriet Miller, Ian's mother
- Jayne Eastwood as Mrs. White, a non-Greek neighbor
- Kathryn Haggis as Cousin Marianthi
- Peter Tharos as Yianni, Athena's husband
- Maria Vacratsis as Theia Freida

== Production ==
=== Development ===
My Big Fat Greek Wedding started as a one-woman 45-minute monologue workshop, written by, and starring Vardalos, first developed in the HBO Workshop, then tested in Chicago, Toronto and Europe, later performed at the Hudson Backstage Theatre in Los Angeles in August 1997, moving to ACME Comedy Theatre, still as a workshop.

The one-woman 45-minute monologue workshop was based on Vardalos's own family in Winnipeg in Canada and on her experience marrying a non-Greek man (actor Ian Gomez). The workshop was popular and was sold out for much of its run, in part due to Vardalos's marketing it across Greek Orthodox churches in the area. Several Hollywood executives and celebrities saw it, including actress Rita Wilson, who herself has Greek heritage. Wilson convinced her husband, actor Tom Hanks, to see it as well.

Vardalos began meeting various executives about making a film version of the monologue and began writing a screenplay as well. However, the meetings proved fruitless because the executives insisted on making changes that they felt would make the film more marketable, to which Vardalos objected. These included changing the plot, getting a known actress in the lead role (Marisa Tomei was one name mentioned), and changing the family's ethnicity to Hispanic. Two months after the monologue's initial run ended, Hanks's production company, Playtone, contacted Vardalos about producing a film based on her vision for it. They also agreed to remount it as a one-woman play in January 1998 at the Globe Playhouse, West Hollywood, for a three-night-a-week run.

In 2000, while in Toronto doing pre-production for the film, Vardalos and Playtone producer Gary Goetzman overheard actor John Corbett (who was in town shooting the film Serendipity) at a bar, telling a friend of his about having read the script for My Big Fat Greek Wedding, and being upset that he couldn't make the auditions. Vardalos and Goetzman approached Corbett and offered him the part of Ian Miller on the spot, which he accepted.

Hanks later said that casting Vardalos in the lead role "brings a huge amount of integrity to the piece because it's Nia's version of her own life and her own experience. I think that shows through on the screen and people recognize it."

=== Filming ===
Despite being based on life in the Greek community of Winnipeg, the film was set in Chicago and shot in both Toronto and Chicago. Toronto Metropolitan University and the Greektown neighborhood are featured prominently in the film. The home used to depict Gus and Maria Portokalos's residence (as well as the home bought next door at the end of the film for Toula and Ian) is located on Glenwood Crescent just off O'Connor Drive in the Toronto suburb of East York. The real home representing the Portokalos' residence retained most of the external ornamentation that was shown in the film until 2021. Also, some minor parts of the movie were shot at Jarvis Collegiate Institute in Toronto. Principal photography began on May 9, 2001 and ended on June 30, 2001. Locations from the film include:

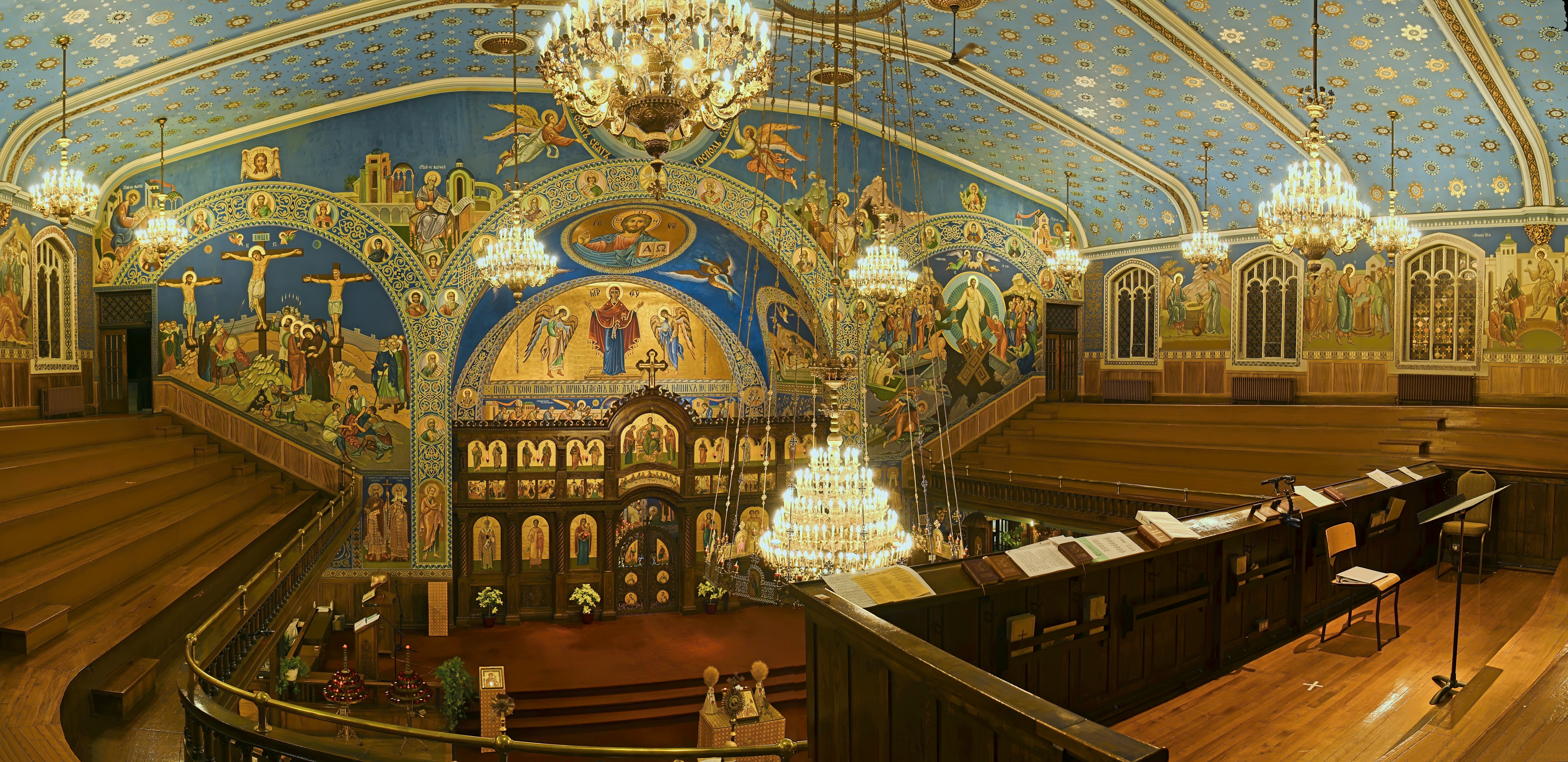
The wedding was shot in St. Nicholas Ukrainian Catholic Church in Toronto.

- Dancing Zorba's (exterior) – 132 Simcoe Street [demolished in 2002]
- Portakalos house – 73 Glenwood Crescent
- Toula's School – Westway Junior School
- Olympus Travel Agency – 439 Danforth Avenue
- Harry S. Truman College – Rogers Communications Centre
- Waterfront date – Amsterdam Bridge
- Ian's apartment – Upper Canada Apartments, 5 Lonsdale Road
- Miller house – 16 Amelia Street
- Ian's school – Jarvis Collegiate Institute
- Greek Orthodox Church – Holy Trinity Russian Orthodox Cathedral (exterior); St. Nicholas Ukrainian Catholic Church (interior)
- Aphrodite's Palace – 702 Pape Avenue (exterior); Ellas Banquet Hall, 35 Danforth Road (interior) [demolished in 2016]
- Ian and Toula's house – 75 Glenwood Crescent

== Release ==
After a February 2002 premiere, the movie was initially released in the United States via a limited release on April 19, 2002. It received a wider release worldwide over the summer, including a wide release in the United States on August 2.

== Reception ==
=== Box office ===
My Big Fat Greek Wedding became a sleeper hit and grew steadily from its limited release. Despite never hitting the number one spot for a box office weekend and being an independent film with a $5 million budget, it ultimately grossed over $368.7 million worldwide, becoming one of the top romantic films of the 21st century. It was the fifth highest-grossing film of 2002 in the United States and Canada, making USD$241,438,208, and the highest-grossing romantic comedy domestically in history. Domestically, it also held the record for the highest-grossing film never having been number one on the weekly North American box office charts, until the 2016 release of the animated film Sing. However, adjusted for inflation, the gross of My Big Fat Greek Wedding was still higher, equivalent to $322 million in 2016. The film is among the most profitable of all time, with a 6150% return on an (also inflation-adjusted) cost of $6 million to produce.

As of December 2003, the video sold 9.85 million copies earning a profit of over $164.8 million.

=== Critical response ===
On the review aggregator website Rotten Tomatoes, 76% of 130 critics' reviews are positive, with an average rating of 6.7/10. The website's consensus reads: "Though it sometimes feels like a television sitcom, My Big Fat Greek Wedding is good-hearted, lovable, and delightfully eccentric, with a sharp script and lead performance from Nia Vardalos." Metacritic, which uses a weighted average, assigned the film a score of 62 out of 100, based on 29 critics, indicating "generally favorable" reviews. Audiences polled by CinemaScore gave the film an average grade of "A−" on an A+ to F scale.

=== Accolades ===
- 2008: AFI's 10 Top 10:
  - Nominated Romantic Comedy Film

List of awards and nominations
Award	Category	Recipients	Result
Academy Awards	Best Original Screenplay	Nia Vardalos	Nominated
Critics' Choice Awards	Best Acting Ensemble	My Big Fat Greek Wedding	Nominated
Critics' Choice Awards	Best Writer	Nia Vardalos	Nominated
Golden Globe Awards	Best Motion Picture – Musical or Comedy	My Big Fat Greek Wedding	Nominated
Golden Globe Awards	Best Actress – Motion Picture Musical or Comedy	Nia Vardalos	Nominated
MTV Movie Awards	Best Breakthrough Female Performance	Nia Vardalos	Nominated
People's Choice Awards	Favorite Motion Picture	My Big Fat Greek Wedding	Nominated
People's Choice Awards	Favorite Comedy Motion Picture	My Big Fat Greek Wedding	Won
Producers Guild of America	Best Theatrical Motion Picture	My Big Fat Greek Wedding	Nominated
Satellite Awards
Satellite Awards	Best Motion Picture - Musical or Comedy	My Big Fat Greek Wedding	Won
Satellite Awards	Best Actress - Musical or Comedy	Nia Vardalos	Nominated
Satellite Awards	Best Supporting Actor - Musical or Comedy	Michael Constantine	Won
Satellite Awards	Best Supporting Actress - Musical or Comedy	Lainie Kazan	Nominated
Satellite Awards	Best Adapted Screenplay	Nia Vardalos	Nominated
Screen Actors Guild Award	Outstanding Performance by a Cast in a Motion Picture	My Big Fat Greek Wedding	Nominated
Writers Guild of America Award	Best Original Screenplay	Nia Vardalos	Nominated

=== 10th-anniversary edition ===
In 2012, a 10th anniversary edition of the film was released via DVD and Blu-ray by HBO. The edition contains a digital copy of the film and features deleted scenes as well as a 30-minute retrospective with Vardalos and Corbett.

== Lawsuits ==
The cast (with the exception of Vardalos, who had a separate deal), as well as Hanks' production company, Playtone, sued the studio in 2007 for their part of the profits they were owed. They charged that Gold Circle Films was engaging in so-called "Hollywood accounting" practices where it reported only $287 million in aggregate gross receipts, including box office earnings, television broadcast rights and video sales rentals, despite grossing $370 million in box office alone. This followed another lawsuit in 2003 where the original producers of the film MPH Entertainment Inc. sued the production company Playtone and Gold Circle Films where one of the defendants claimed that the film lost $20 million despite a reported gross of $600 million from various revenue streams.

== Legacy ==
=== Television series ===
The film inspired the brief 2003 TV series My Big Fat Greek Life, with most of the major characters played by the same actors, with the exception of Steven Eckholdt replacing Corbett as the husband. Corbett had already signed on to the TV series Lucky. He was scheduled to appear as the best friend of his replacement's character, but the show was cancelled before he appeared. The show received poor reviews from critics noting the random character entrances and serious plot "adjustments" that did not match the film.

The seven episodes from the series are available on DVD from Sony Pictures Home Entertainment, whose TV studio division produced the show.

=== Sequels ===
==== My Big Fat Greek Wedding 2 (2016) ====
In a 2009 interview for her film My Life in Ruins, asked about a possible sequel for My Big Fat Greek Wedding, Vardalos said that she had an idea for a sequel and had started writing it, hinting that, like Ruins, the film would be set in Greece.

Asked about a sequel again in a November 2012 interview, she said:

Well, actually, yes. And it's only now that I've become open to the idea. Over the years, I've heard from everybody about what the sequel should be. People next to me at Starbucks would say, 'Hey, let me tell you my idea,' and I'd be like, 'Hey, I'm just trying to get a cup of coffee.' I never thought much about it. But then when John (Corbett) and I recently sat down to do that interview (for the 10th anniversary edition), we laughed so hard through the whole thing. It made me think that it's time. He said, "Come on, write something, will you?" And I now think I will. We have such an easy chemistry together. And we have chemistry because we never 'did it.' That's the surefire way to kill chemistry in a scene. You have to make sure your actors don't 'do it' off-screen. If they don't 'do it,' then they'll have chemistry on camera.

On May 27, 2014, various news and media outlets reported that a sequel was in the works. Nia Vardalos later confirmed this via Twitter, and she also has written a script for the film. The first trailer for My Big Fat Greek Wedding 2 was aired on NBC's The Today Show on November 11, 2015 and it was released on March 25, 2016, to negative critical reception and modest box office success.

==== My Big Fat Greek Wedding 3 (2023) ====
In late June 2016, Vardalos said that she had not written a third film, but was open to the possibility. On April 8, 2021, it was announced that My Big Fat Greek Wedding 3 was in development as an independent film written by Vardalos, who would also reprise her role as Toula. The project was delayed by the COVID-19 pandemic, as production could not begin until the studio was able to obtain insurance for its crew. In October 2021, Vardalos confirmed that the script for the third film had been completed.

On May 15, 2022, it was announced that filming would take place throughout Greece that summer, with large portions being shot on Corfu from July 5 to August 3. On June 22, Vardalos was announced as the film's director. Principal photography commenced on June 22, 2022, in Athens and wrapped on August 10, 2022.

The film is a joint production of Playtone, Gold Circle Films, HBO Films, and Focus Features and was released on September 8, 2023. The film was dedicated to the memory of Michael Constantine, who died on August 31, 2021, at the age of 94. The film's plot follows the Portokalos family on a trip to Greece for a family reunion following the death of Toula's father Gus.
