= My Big Fat Greek Wedding 2 =

- Theatrical release poster
- Directed by: Kirk Jones
- Written by: Nia Vardalos
- Produced by: Gary Goetzman; Tom Hanks; Rita Wilson
- Starring: Nia Vardalos; John Corbett; Lainie Kazan; Gia Carides; Joey Fatone; Louis Mandylor; Andrea Martin; Michael Constantine
- Cinematography: Jim Denault
- Edited by: Markus Czyzewski
- Music by: Christopher Lennertz
- Production companies: Gold Circle Entertainment; Home Box Office; Playtone
- Distributed by: Universal Pictures
- Release dates: March 15, 2016 (New York City); March 25, 2016 (United States)
- Running time: 94 minutes
- Country: United States
- Language: English
- Budget: $18 million
- Box office: $92.1 million

My Big Fat Greek Wedding 2 is a 2016 American romantic comedy film directed by Kirk Jones and written by Nia Vardalos. The film stars Vardalos, John Corbett, Lainie Kazan, Michael Constantine (in his final film role), Andrea Martin, Ian Gomez, and Elena Kampouris.

It is the sequel to the 2002 film My Big Fat Greek Wedding and the second installment in the My Big Fat Greek Wedding franchise. Filming began in late May 2015 in Toronto and the film was released on March 25, 2016, by Universal Pictures, receiving negative reviews from critics. The film grossed $92 million worldwide against a $18 million budget. A third film, entitled My Big Fat Greek Wedding 3, was released on September 8, 2023.

== Plot ==
Toula Portokalos-Miller's life is in shambles; both her travel agency and the family dry cleaners have closed due to the recession. The only family business still open is the restaurant that her father, Gus, still runs. Her husband, Ian, is the principal at their teenage daughter Paris' high school.

Paris, who is applying to college, feels smothered by her close-knit clan, who constantly interfere in her life. Desperate for independence and privacy, she applies to schools across the country. Ian and Toula's marriage has become strained due to Toula's obsessive need to be involved in Paris' life and to "fix" whatever goes wrong in her family.

Meanwhile, Gus has convinced himself that he is directly descended from Alexander the Great and wants to write to an online ancestry site for confirmation. While sorting through his records, he discovers that his and Maria's marriage certificate was never signed by the priest, technically invalidating their union. His current priest isn't allowed to sign it but agrees to perform a new ceremony.

Gus insists that he and Maria must marry again after fifty years together, but she wants him to propose properly. When he refuses, an infuriated Maria refuses to go through with the ceremony. Meanwhile, when Toula and Ian are on a date night to rekindle their romance, their family catches them making out in their car outside their house.

When Gus has to go to the hospital, Maria initially refuses to go, saying she is not his wife. Gus pleads for her to marry him again. This time, she accepts.

Wanting the wedding she never had, Maria hires a wedding planner, who later quits after the rowdy family's choices become too outlandish. The whole family, including Ian's parents, Rodney and Harriet, and Angelo's business partner, Patrick, pitch in to make the wedding happen. Nick urges Angelo to tell his parents, Voula and Taki, that Patrick is also Angelo's romantic partner. Gus's estranged brother, Panos, arrives from Greece as a surprise.

Paris has been accepted to Northwestern University in Chicago and NYU in NYC. She chooses Northwestern to please her mother, but Paris' great-grandmother convinces her she should go to New York.

Paris asks Bennett, a boy she has a crush on, to the prom. Paris is initially embarrassed about her background, but he turns out to also be Greek with an equally crazy family. Prom is the same night as the wedding, so Toula tells her she can go to the prom if she attends the reception later.

En route to the church, Gus, Panos, and Taki arrive drunk after many shots of ouzo. Maria storms off to the vestry after seeing Gus acting foolishly, feeling he is not taking the wedding seriously. Panos tells Maria that Gus had confided to him his love for her, so the ceremony continues. Watching as Gus and Maria renew their marriage ceremony, Ian and Toula privately renew theirs. At the prom, Paris and Bennett share their first kiss while slow-dancing.

At the wedding reception, Gus reads a letter from the ancestry site verifying that he is a descendant of Alexander the Great. Ian, however, realizes that Toula forged the letter to make her father happy. The movie ends with the entire family dropping Paris off at her college dorm in New York.

== Cast ==
- Nia Vardalos as Fotoula "Toula" Portokalos-Miller
- John Corbett as Ian Miller, Toula's husband
- Elena Kampouris as Paris Miller, Toula and Ian's 17-year-old daughter
- Lainie Kazan as Maria Portokalos, Toula's mother
- Michael Constantine as Kostas "Gus" Portokalos, Toula's father
- Andrea Martin as Theia Voula, Toula's aunt
- Louis Mandylor as Nick Portokalos, Toula's brother
- Gia Carides as Cousin Nikki, Voula's daughter
- Gerry Mendicino as Uncle Taki, Voula's husband, and Angelo and Nikki's father.
- Joey Fatone as Cousin Angelo, Voula's son
- Bess Meisler as Mana-Yiayia, Toula's grandmother
- Stavroula Logothettis as Athena Portokalos, Toula's sister
- Ian Gomez as Mike, Ian's best friend
- Mark Margolis as Panos Portokalos, Kostas's brother
- John Stamos as George, a Greek-American news anchor
- Rita Wilson as Anna, George's wife.
- Alex Wolff as Bennett, Paris's love interest
- Bruce Gray as Rodney Miller, Ian's father
- Fiona Reid as Harriet Miller, Ian's mother
- Jayne Eastwood as Mrs. White, the Portokalos' neighbor
- Rob Riggle as Northwestern Rep

== Production ==
In a 2009 interview for her film My Life in Ruins, asked about a possible sequel to the 2002 hit romantic comedy My Big Fat Greek Wedding, Nia Vardalos stated that she had an idea for a sequel and had started writing it, hinting that, like Ruins, the film would be set in Greece.

Asked about a sequel again in a November 2012 interview, she stated:

Well, actually, yes. And it's only now that I've really become open to the idea. Over the years, I've heard from everybody about what the sequel should be. People next to me at Starbucks would say, "Hey, let me tell you my idea," and I'd be like, "Hey, I'm just trying to get a cup of coffee." I never thought much about it. But then when John (Corbett) and I recently sat down to do that interview (for the 10th anniversary edition), we laughed so hard through the whole thing. It made me think that it's time. He said, "Come on, write something, will you?" And I now think I will. We have such an easy chemistry together. And we have chemistry because we never "did it." That's the surefire way to kill chemistry in a scene. You have to make sure your actors don't "do it" off-screen. If they don't "do it," then they'll have chemistry on camera.

On May 27, 2014, various news and media outlets reported that a sequel was in the works. Vardalos later confirmed this via Twitter, and wrote the script for the film. Universal Pictures acquired the US distribution rights to the film on November 11, 2014, and Kirk Jones was set to direct, based on the script by Vardalos, who also starred.

=== Filming ===
Principal photography began on May 10, 2015, in Toronto, and ended on June 28.

== Release ==
On May 21, 2015, Universal set the film for a March 25, 2016, release.

On November 11, 2015, the first trailer was released during an airing of NBC's The Today Show.

=== Home media ===
My Big Fat Greek Wedding 2 was released on DVD and Blu-ray on June 21, 2016.

== Reception ==
=== Box office ===
In its opening weekend, the film was projected to gross $15 million from 3,133 theaters. It grossed $7.2 million on its first day and $17.9 million in its opening weekend, finishing third at the box office behind Batman v Superman: Dawn of Justice ($166 million) and Zootopia ($24 million). In its second weekend, the film grossed $11.2 million (a 37.2% drop), again finishing third behind Batman v Superman ($51.3 million) and Zootopia ($19.3 million).

=== Critical reception ===
On Rotten Tomatoes, the film has an approval rating of 28% based on 172 reviews, with an average rating of 4.6/10. The site's critical consensus reads, "My Big Fat Greek Wedding 2 is as sweet and harmless as the original, but its collection of sitcom gags and stereotypes never coalesces into anything resembling a story with a purpose." Metacritic gave the film a weighted average score of 37 out of 100, based on 32 critics, indicating "generally unfavorable reviews". Audiences polled by CinemaScore gave the film an average grade of "A−" on an A+ to F scale.

Jeanette Catsoulis of The New York Times criticized the sequel as "something tired and familiar," noting its lack of originality and its dependence on broad, predictable comedy that strained the goodwill of the original film. Conversely, Geoff Berkshire of Variety praised the film's saccharine charm and the cast's ability to mine laughs from cultural quirks, while noting the film's sitcom-like structure limited deeper emotional resonance compared to the original.

=== Accolades ===
Award	Category	Recipients	Result	Ref.
Alliance of Women Film Journalists EDA Awards	Hall of Shame Award	My Big Fat Greek Wedding 2	Nominated	
AARP Movies for Grownups Awards	Best Comedy	My Big Fat Greek Wedding 2	Nominated	
AARP Movies for Grownups Awards	Best Grownup Love Story	Michael Constantine	Nominated	
AARP Movies for Grownups Awards	Best Grownup Love Story	Lainie Kazan	Nominated	
