= My Big Fat Greek Wedding 3 =

2023 film by Nia Vardalos

- Theatrical release poster
- Directed by: Nia Vardalos
- Written by: Nia Vardalos
- Produced by: Rita Wilson; Tom Hanks; Gary Goetzman
- Starring: Nia Vardalos; John Corbett; Louis Mandylor; Elena Kampouris; Gia Carides; Joey Fatone; Lainie Kazan; Andrea Martin
- Cinematography: Barry Peterson
- Edited by: Annette Davey; Craig Herring
- Music by: Stephanie Economou
- Production companies: Gold Circle Entertainment; Playtone; Artistic Films
- Distributed by: Focus Features
- Release dates: September 6, 2023 (Belgium); September 8, 2023 (United States)
- Running time: 92 minutes
- Country: United States
- Language: English
- Box office: $38.8 million

My Big Fat Greek Wedding 3 is a 2023 American romantic comedy film written and directed by Nia Vardalos. The third and final installment in the My Big Fat Greek Wedding franchise, the film stars Vardalos, John Corbett, Louis Mandylor, Elena Kampouris, Gia Carides, Joey Fatone, Lainie Kazan, and Andrea Martin. It is the first entry not to feature cast members Michael Constantine (who died in 2021), Bruce Gray (who died in 2017), Bess Meisler and Ian Gomez. Filming took place in Athens, Greece, from June through August 2022.

After the death of Toula's father, she and many of the Portokalos family travel to Greece to find his childhood friends to gift them his American journal as well as, supposedly, for a family reunion.

My Big Fat Greek Wedding 3 was released internationally by Universal Pictures on September 6 and in the United States and Canada on September 8, 2023, by Focus Features. It received generally negative reviews from critics and has grossed $38 million worldwide.

== Plot ==
In the wake of both Gus Portokalos and Ian's father Rodney's passing a year ago, the Portokalos family is grappling with grief. Nick, now separated, returns home, displaying immature behavior. Athena and her husband Yiannis are caring for Maria, who is battling dementia. Toula and Ian, though happily married, are facing the challenges of parenthood while their daughter Paris struggles with the responsibility of college, completely unbeknownst to them.

Victory, a distant relative and the mayor of Gus' hometown Vrisi, invites the family for a supposed reunion. On the flight to Greece, Aunt Voula introduces her assistant Aristotle, Paris' college-mate, and Toula reveals she is bringing Gus' journal, containing his life story, to give to his three childhood friends in Greece as promised.

They arrive in Athens, where Victory greets them, and they go sightseeing. In the nearly abandoned Vrisi, they find Gus' childhood home and meet Alexandra, Gus's old flame. There, Victory confesses there is no reunion, hoping the Portokaloses would revive the village. The family goes to a nearby town the following day, where Toula searches for Gus's friends without success and gets drunk on ouzo. Nick searches for the village's oldest tree and Ian befriends a monk, who possesses information about everyone's activities in the village. Meanwhile, Aristotle tries to communicate with Paris, who rebuffs his advances without explaining why.

At dinner, Toula and Ian meet Peter, Alexandra's son by Gus, whom the latter never knew about, as well as his son Christos, and Alexandra's assistant Qamar. Afterwards, Christos and Qamar take Aristotle and Paris to a club, where they reveal they are secretly betrothed. The next day, Toula informs her family about Peter, but struggles to locate Gus' friends. Fortunately, the monk gave Ian a list of those who left the village, pinpointing one who moved to Syros. Toula shares this with Nikki and Angelo, who head to Syros and return with them.

Meanwhile, Toula discovers Nick brought Gus's ashes to Greece, following his father's wish for them to be scattered by the oldest tree in Vrisi. Later that evening, the family learns about Christos and Qamar's engagement, coupled with the revelation of Paris being on academic probation. Peter and Alexandra express disapproval, prompting Ian to offer intervention for Paris. However, the younger generation rejects external interference, opting to address their issues independently.

The next day, Peter comes to terms with Christos and Qamar's relationship, with Alexandra eventually doing the same. Victory recognizes the potential of a wedding to revitalize the village and initiates plans. Toula and Ian receive encouragement to unwind and relish their vacation while the rest of the family collaborates in organizing the wedding, albeit with their assistance in the final stages.

In a joyous celebration, Qamar's family joins them for her wedding to Christos. Paris opens up about her split with Aristotle, citing struggles with independence, and they agree to take things slow, much to Aunt Voula's delight. Nikki and Angelo arrive with Gus' friends, and Toula presents them with his journal.

Later, Toula, Nick, and Peter privately scatter Gus' ashes around the tree, and Victory's mayorship receives praise. Toula and Nick decide to bring Peter with them to America, now as part of the family. The siblings, on the way, engage in a playful dispute over who should now lead the family, each citing their actions during the journey.

== Cast ==
- Nia Vardalos as Fotoula "Toula" Portokalos-Miller
- John Corbett as Ian Miller
- Louis Mandylor as Nick Portokalos
- Elena Kampouris as Paris Miller
- Lainie Kazan as Maria Portokalos
- Andrea Martin as Theia Voula
- Gia Carides as Cousin Nikki
- Joey Fatone as Cousin Angelo
- Maria Vacratsis as Theia Freida
- Elias Kacavas as Aristotle
- Melina Kotselou as Victory
- Anthi Andreopoulou as Alexandra
- Alexis Georgoulis as Peter
- Giannis Vasilottos as Christos
- Stephanie Nur as Qamar
- Gerry Mendicino as Uncle Taki
- Stavroula Logothettis as Athena Portokalos
- Kathryn Haggis as Marianthi
- Jayne Eastwood as Mrs. White
- Kathryn Greenwood as Marge
- Tannis Burnett as Edie

== Production ==
=== Development ===
In late June 2016, Nia Vardalos hinted at the possibility of a third film, saying that she had an idea for the plot, although no writing had been done. In April 2021, it was reported that My Big Fat Greek Wedding 3 was in development as an independent film, written by Vardalos, who will also reprise her role as co-star. As an independent film, the studio could not get insurance to begin filming amid the COVID-19 pandemic in 2021. In October 2021, Vardalos confirmed that the script for the third film had been completed and that it would involve another Greek wedding. In June 2022, it was reported that Vardalos will serve as director on the third film.

=== Filming ===
Principal photography commenced in Athens, Greece, on June 22, 2022. Large portions of the film were shot on Corfu from July 5 to August 3, 2022. On August 10, 2022, filming officially wrapped.

== Release ==
My Big Fat Greek Wedding 3 was released by Focus Features in the United States on September 8, 2023.

=== Marketing ===
In February 2023, a first look image of the film, which features the Portakalos family in Greece, was released coinciding with the announcement of the film's release date. On May 11, 2023, the film's official trailer was released. Promotional tie-ins included branded merchandise, social media campaigns which encourages fans to share personal family stories, and a recap video recapping the first two films. In addition, Focus Features held "Greek Week" fan events in September 2023, featuring special screenings of the film, Q&A sessions with film's cast, and cultural activities in New York and Los Angeles theaters.

=== Home media ===
The film was released on digital platforms on September 26, 2023, three weeks after its theatrical release. It was then released for Blu-ray and DVD on October 31, 2023.

== Reception ==
=== Box office ===
As of October 31, 2023, My Big Fat Greek Wedding 3 has grossed $28.4 million in the United States and Canada, and $10.3 million in other territories, for a worldwide total of $38.8 million.

In the United States and Canada, My Big Fat Greek Wedding 3 made $3.7 million on its first day, including $550,000 from Thursday night previews. It went on to debut to $10 million from 3,650 theaters, finishing third at the box office behind fellow newcomer The Nun II and holdover The Equalizer 3. In its second weekend the film made $4.7 million (a drop of 53%), finishing in fourth.

=== Critical response ===
On the review aggregator website Rotten Tomatoes, 29% of 94 critics' reviews are positive, with an average rating of 4.4/10. The website's consensus reads: "Amiable and sunny if often unamusing, My Big Fat Greek Wedding 3 repeats much of what audiences loved the first time around but suffers from diminishing returns." Metacritic, which uses a weighted average, assigned the film a score of 35 out of 100, based on 26 critics, indicating "generally unfavorable" reviews. Audiences surveyed by CinemaScore gave the film an average grade of "B" on an A+ to F scale, while those polled at PostTrak gave it a 73% overall positive score, with 55% saying they would definitely recommend the film.

Critics frequently praised the film's warm portrayal of family bondage as a strength, noting the ensemble's chemistry and authentic depiction of Greek-American traditions during the Portokalos family's trip to Greece. Matt Zoller Seitz of RogerEbert.com stated that the "intensely loyal family dynamics, where characters remain fundamentally decent through blood, marriage, or friendship, evokes comfort in its escapist familiarity." Similarly, Jesse Hessenger of The Guardian appreciated the film's "deeply relatable immigrant-family humor and the emotional depth in exploring aging and loss, such as the gradual abdication of family roles, which lent a vast river of sadness beneath the surface." Nia Vardalos's performance as Toula Portakalos was often singled out for praise for its sincerity, with Arezou Amin of Collider praising her direction for capturing the genuine cultural authenticity in scenes of reunion and reconciliation.

Much of the criticism centered on the screenplay's predictability and staleness, with conflicts introduced and then resolved too easily without any meaningful stakes or character development. Matt Zoller Seitz described in his review about the plot's "craftiness" in manufacturing "non-conflicts" that demand little sacrifice, resulting in a formula that feels rote after the two prior films. Jesse Hessenger echoed this sentiment in his review, faulting the film's "lack of story beyond 'family gets older'" and labored editing that misses the comic timing, turning the film into a "rambling and rote travelogue." The handling of deceased characters, particularly the family's patriarch Gus Portakalos, drew particular ire for its convenience; Seitz noted in his review how the film "leans into the immutable facts of life" but glosses over the emotional weight, using absence as a plot device rather than a source of depth. Jen Chaney of Vulture called the film's overall construction a "mess," with thinly sketched new elements and overused jokes diminishing any freshness, though she stated that Andrea Martin's portrayal of Aunt Voula provided the film's rare genuine laughs through her dry delivery.
