= Elena Kampouris =

American actress (born 1997)

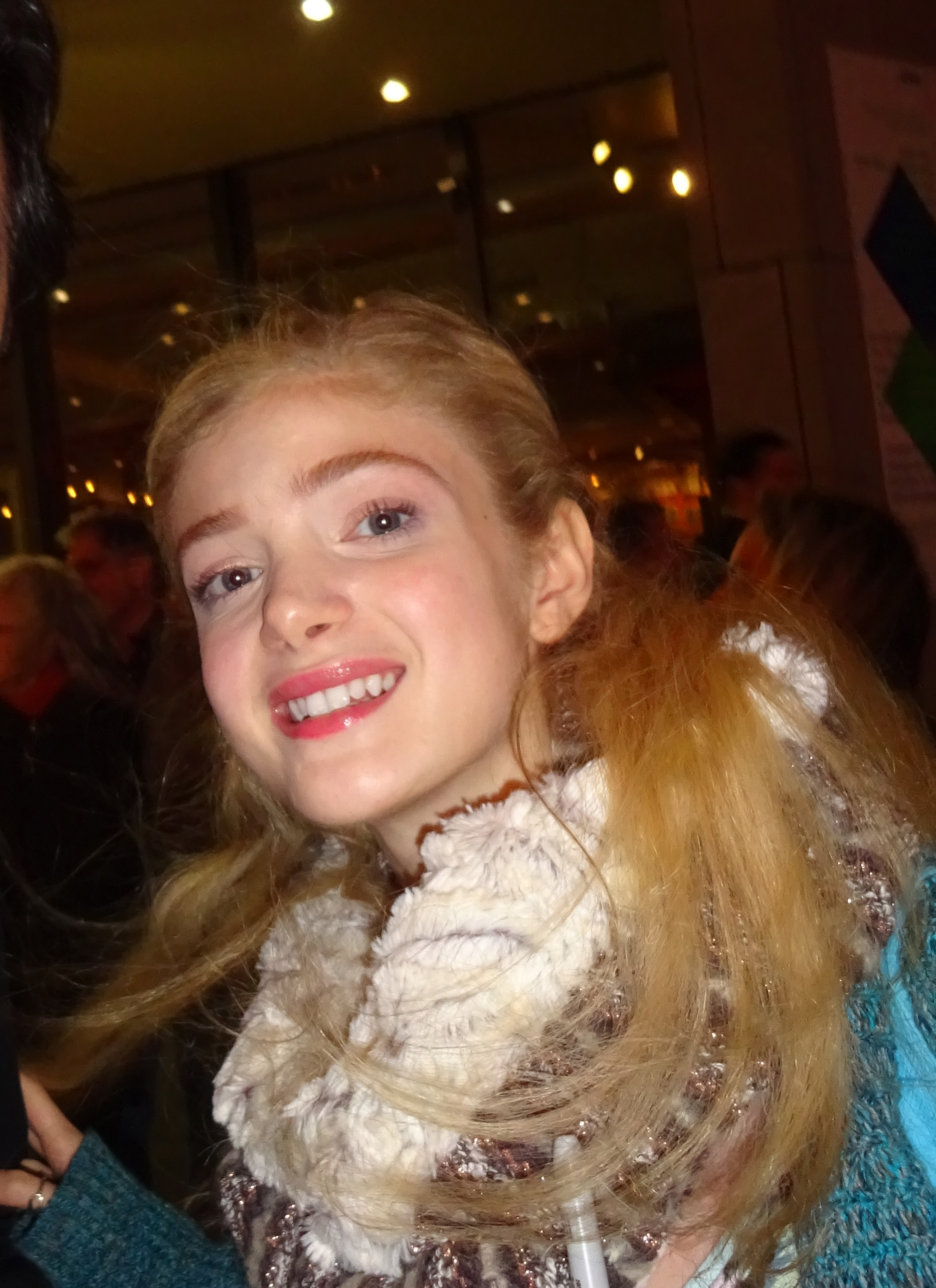
- Kampouris in October 2016
- Born: September 16, 1997 (age 29); New York City, U.S.
- Occupation: Actress
- Years active: 2012–present
- Relatives: Emmanuel Kampouris (grandfather)

Elena Kampouris (Greek: Έλενα Καμπούρη; born September 16, 1997) is an American actress. Her films include Men, Women & Children (2014), the My Big Fat Greek Wedding (2016–2023) sequels, Before I Fall (2017) and Here Now (2024). On television, she is known for her roles in the NBC drama American Odyssey (2015) and the Netflix superhero series Jupiter's Legacy (2021). She made her Broadway debut as Cécile Volanges in Les Liaisons Dangereuses (2016).

== Early life ==
Kampouris was born in New York City on September 16, 1997, the daughter of American fashion illustrator Ivey Barry and Greek wine store owner Alexander Kampouris and granddaughter of American Standard Companies CEO Emmanuel Kampouris. She also has English and French ancestry through her mother. Her father, a native of Kasos, operates his wine store in Basking Ridge, New Jersey. Kampouris has an older brother named Emmanuel, and grew up in Bridgewater Township, New Jersey. She attended Gill St. Bernard's School, though she left and was tutored for her final years of high school.

== Career ==
In 2012, Kampouris made her acting debut with a small guest role as a Constance Girl in one episode of The CW teen drama series Gossip Girl. She followed this with the Nickelodeon television comedy film Jinxed (2013), in which she played Ivy Murray. That same year, Kampouris made her film debut in the drama Labor Day, playing a young Rachel McCann. In December 2013, she signed with the William Morris Endeavor talent agency.

In 2014, Kampouris played Allison Doss in the comedy-drama film Men, Women & Children. Later, she portrayed Alexia in the comedy-drama film The Cobbler.

In 2015, she starred in the NBC thriller series American Odyssey as Maya Decker, the daughter of Peter Facinelli's character. The series was cancelled after one season. Kampouris had a supporting role as Paris Miller in the romantic comedy film franchise My Big Fat Greek Wedding, beginning with the 2016 sequel My Big Fat Greek Wedding 2 and reprised the role in the 2023 sequel My Big Fat Greek Wedding 3.

In 2016, she made her Broadway debut in a production of Les Liaisons Dangereuses. Kampouris played the supporting role of Cécile Volanges, a wealthy and naive teenager. The following year, she had a supporting role as Juliet Sykes in the drama film Before I Fall.

On February 11, 2019, it was announced that Kampouris was cast as Chloe Sampson in the Netflix superhero series, Jupiter's Legacy.

== Filmography ==
=== Film ===
Year	Title	Role	Notes
2013	Labor Day	Young Rachel McCann	
2014	Men, Women & Children	Allison Doss	
2014	The Cobbler	Alexia	
2016	My Big Fat Greek Wedding 2	Paris Miller	
2017	Before I Fall	Juliet Sykes	
2019	Summer Night	Corin	
2020	Children of the Corn	Boleyn Williams	
2021	Shoplifters of the World	Sheila	
2022	Wifelike	Meredith	
2023	My Big Fat Greek Wedding 3	Paris Miller	
2023	Vindicta	Lou	
2024	Here Now	Sophie	

=== Television ===
Year	Title	Role	Notes
2012	Gossip Girl	Constance Girl #2	Episode: "It Girl, Interrupted"
2013	Jinxed	Ivy Murray	TV film
2015	American Odyssey	Maya Decker	9 episodes
2018	Sacred Lies	Minnow Bly	Series regular
2021	Jupiter's Legacy	Chloe Sampson	Main cast

== Stage ==
Year	Production	Role	Location	Notes
2016	Les Liaisons Dangereuses	Cécile Volanges	Booth Theatre	Broadway
