= Gerry Mendicino =

Canadian actor

- Born: Gennaro Mendicino; May 18, 1950 (age 75); North Bay, Ontario, Canada
- Occupation: Actor
- Years active: 1971–present
- Website: gerrymendicino.com

Gennaro "Gerry" Mendicino (born May 18, 1950) is a Canadian actor.

Mendicino was born in North Bay, Ontario, and graduated from the University of Windsor Drama School in 1973. Throughout his career, he has played a wide range of characters. He began on the television series King of Kensington and went on to host the children's television series Polka Dot Door from 1979 to 1984. He portrayed Sam Ramone in the television series Ready or Not. His most notable film role came as Uncle Taki in the My Big Fat Greek Wedding franchise.

== Filmography ==
=== Film ===
Year	Title	Role	Notes
1984	Bedroom Eyes	Man In Hallway	
1988	Milk and Honey		
1990	Gate 2: The Trespassers	Maitre d'	
1991	If Looks Could Kill	Herb Corben	
1992	Edsville	The Mechanic / Organist	Short film
1993	Change of Heart	Raoul	
1994	Foreign Bodies		
1994	The Circle Game	Officer Walchuk	
1996	No One Could Protect Her	Officer Lasser	
1997	That Old Feeling	Maitre d'	
1997	The Wrong Guy	Teamster	
1998	The Big Hit	Slave Trader	
1998	Dirty Work	Manetti	
2000	Woman Wanted	Vinnie	
2002	My Big Fat Greek Wedding	Uncle Taki	
2002	Between Strangers	Detective	
2002	Saint Monica	Frank	
2004	A Hole in One	Johnnie	
2004	Moss	Jacob Schump	Short film
2005	Looking for Angelina	Mazzei	
2005	The Perfect Man	Market Co-Worker	
2005	Short Tongue Freddy	Doney "Fat Doney"	Short film
2006	Lucky Number Slevin	Benny Begin	
2006	Homie Spumoni	Rosa's Owner	
2007	Hairspray	Drunk	
2008	Lucky 10	Bar Owner	Short film
2008	Blindness	Silver Haired Doctor	
2009	Saw VI	Hank	
2009	The Ache	Dr. Howell	
2010	The Dogfather	Don Tazio	
2012	Havana 57	Captain Ramiro Ibanez	
2014	Americanistan	Old Man	Short film
2014	Dr. Cabbie	Bruno Babagelata	
2015	Life	The Tailor	
2016	My Big Fat Greek Wedding 2	Uncle Taki	
2023	My Big Fat Greek Wedding 3	Uncle Taki	

=== Television ===
Year	Title	Role	Notes
1971	Polka Dot Door	Host	TV series
1975	King of Kensington	Carlo	Episode: "The Christmas Show"
1977	King of Kensington	Vito	Episode: "Gladys' Restaurant"
1982	Seeing Things		Episode: "Eyes Too Big for His Stomach"
1986	The Park Is Mine	Landers	Television film
1986	Night Heat		Episode: "Dead Ringer"; Episode: "Vantage Point"
1987	Night Heat		Episode: "And Baby Makes Grief"
1988	Katts and Dog		Episode: "The Hit"
1988	Alfred Hitchcock Presents	Lieutenant Jack Snyder	Episode: "Full Disclosure"
1988	Street Legal	Captain Mastromantei	Episode: "A Powerful Prison Story"
1989	War of the Worlds	T.J.	Episode: "The Angel of Death"
1990	On Thin Ice: The Tai Babilonia Story		Television film
1992	Street Legal	Doctor	Episode: "November"
1992	Forever Knight		Episode: "Dying for Fame"
1992	In the Eyes of a Stranger		Television film
1993	Woman on Trial: The Lawrencia Bembeneck Story	Fortyish Man	Television film
1993	Matrix	Matrix's Father	Episode: "Lapses in Memory"
1993–1997	Ready or Not	Sam Ramone	31 episodes
1994	Forever Knight	Councillor Cardelli	Episode: "Faithful Followers"
1994	Kung Fu: The Legend Continues	Dominic	Episode: "May I Ride with You"
1995	Kung Fu: The Legend Continues	Dominic	Episode: "May I Walk with You"
1995	Dark Eyes	Fred Kantor	Episode: "Pilot"
1995	The Hardy Boys	Demetrius	Episode: "Say Cheese"
1995	Degree of Guilt	Ramon	Television film
1995	Sugartime	Libonati	Television film
1995	Goosebumps	Nila's Driver	Episode: "Return of the Mummy"
1996	Traders	Moran	Episode: "The Enemy Without"
1996	Double Jeopardy	Priest	Television film
1996	A Husband, a Wife and a Lover	Gary Reynolds	Television film
1996	Gotti	Peter Gotti	Television film
1997	La Femme Nikita	George Hardin	Episode: "Charity"
1997	Any Mother's Son	Judge	Television film
1997	Let Me Call You Sweetheart		Television film
1998	Exhibit A: Secrets of Forensic Science	Mike	Episode: "The Queen of Cons"
1998	Psi Factor: Chronicles of the Paranormal	Niko Andonowski	Episode: "The Labyrinth"
1998	The Fixer	Sergeant Sokates	Television film
1998	The Last Don II	Don Migliaccio	TV miniseries
1999	Universal Soldier III: Unfinished Business	Chief Thorpe	Television film
1998	Naked City: A Killer Christmas	Tony	Television film
1999	Omertà – Le dernier des hommes d'honneur	The Don	TV series
1999	The Wrong Girl	Mr. Drake	Television film
1999	Rocky Marciano	Emcee	Television film
1999	Vendetta	Charles Mantranga	Television film
1999	Execution of Justice	Deputy Sheriff	Television film
1999	Relic Hunter	Dimitri Vordalos	Episode: "Myth of the Maze"
1999–2000	The Avengers: United They Stand	Taurus / Cornelius Van Lunt (voice)	4 episodes
2000	A Tale of Two Bunnies	Norm Hellman	Television film
2000	Twice in a Lifetime	Ernesto Javier Lopez	Episode: "Expose"
2001	Twice in a Lifetime	Vince Santorini	Episode: "Mama Mia"
2001	Relic Hunter	Kalifa	Episode: "Out of the Past"
2001	Boss of Bosses	Father Vicente	Television film
2001	Wild Iris	Vito Delgaccio	Television film
2001	Tracker	Nicholas Tavoulis	Episode: "Trust"
2001	Blue Murder	Sal Farentino	Episode: "Collateral Damage"
2001	Stolen Miracle	Mary's Landlord	Television film
2002	Guilt by Association	Warden Fletcher	Television film
2002	The Interrogation of Michael Crowe	Judge John Thompson	Television film
2003	The Last Chapter II: The War Continues	Don Rizzi	TV miniseries
2003	Sue Thomas: F.B.Eye	Ron Randall / Ronnie Sloane	Episode: "The Hunter"
2003	DC 9/11: Time of Crisis	CIA Director George Tenet	Television film
2004	Il duce canadese	Cederna	TV miniseries
2004	Missing	Mr. Marone	Episode: "Lost Sister"
2004	Doc	Mr. Harlow	Episode: "Choices of the Heart"
2004	Reversible Errors	Gus Leonidas	Television film
2004	What Katy Did	Signor Rinaldo	Television film
2004	Degrassi: The Next Generation	Detective	Episode: "Time Stands Still: Part 2"
2004	Kevin Hill	Judge Thomas Meadows	Episode: "Full Metal Jessie"
2005	Mayday	Captain El-Habashi	Episode: "Death and Denial"
2006	Mayday	Captain Germano	Episode: "Hidden Danger"
2007	72 Hours: True Crime	David Lopez	Episode: "Dead End"
2008	Roxy Hunter and the Myth of the Mermaid	Nikos	Television film
2009	Mayday	Frans Wenas	Episode: "The Plane That Vanished"
2009	The Listener	Demir Bey	Episode: "Missing"
2009	The Ron James Show		Episode: "Who Dies Best"
2010	The Bridge	Hector	Episode: "Red Door/Paint It Black"
2011	Desperately Seeking Santa	Mr. Moretti	Television film
2019	Mistletoe Magic	Robert	Television film
