= Gia Carides =

Australian actress (born 1964)

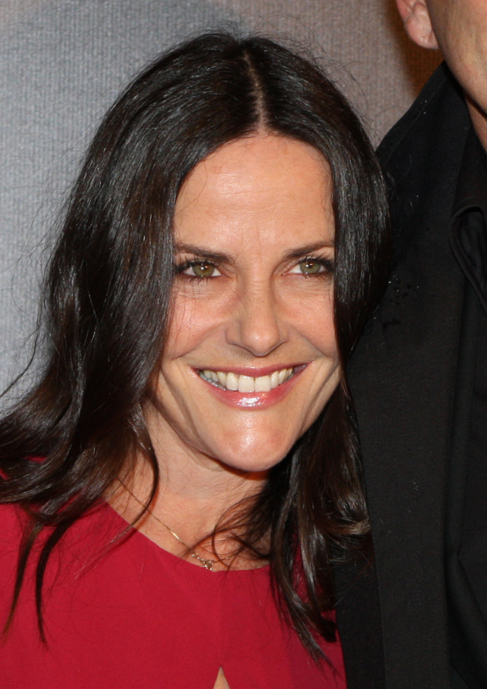
- Gia Carides, in 2013
- Born: 7 June 1964 (age 62); Sydney, New South Wales, Australia
- Education: Riverside Girls High School; Chatswood High School
- Occupation: Actress
- Years active: 1977–present
- Spouse: Anthony LaPaglia (m. 1998; div. 2015)
- Children: 1

Gia Carides (Greek: Γιά Καρίδη, romanized: Giá Karídi; born 7 June 1964) is an Australian actress. She played Liz Holt in Strictly Ballroom (1992), Susy Connor in Brilliant Lies (1996), and Cousin Nikki in the My Big Fat Greek Wedding franchise (2002–2023).

== Early life ==
Carides was born in Sydney, Australia, to a Greek father and an English mother. Gia is sister to Zoe Carides - also an actress - and Danielle Carides, a singer-songwriter. She began acting at the age of 12; her first film was the drama The Love Letters from Teralba Road.

== Career ==
Early in her career, Carides starred as Helena Angelopolous on the Australian television series Police Rescue, also receiving acclaim for her films Strictly Ballroom and Brilliant Lies, with AFI Award nominations for each.

She played Robin Swallows (née Spitz) in Austin Powers: The Spy Who Shagged Me and Cousin Nikki in My Big Fat Greek Wedding, the sequel television show My Big Fat Greek Life, and the two sequel films (My Big Fat Greek Wedding 2 and My Big Fat Greek Wedding 3).

Carides works in both America and Australia, and her film and television credits include Primary Colors, Year One and East of Everything. She also appeared in a guest spot on husband Anthony LaPaglia's television series Without a Trace.

In 2024 Carides was named to appear in ABC series Austin, and was also named in the cast for Stan Australia feature film Nugget is Dead.

== Personal life ==
Carides was married to actor Anthony LaPaglia, whom she met in Sydney in 1992. A year later they starred together in the film Paperback Romance (a.k.a. Lucky Break). She and LaPaglia have a daughter, born in 2003. In April 2015, newspapers reported that LaPaglia and Carides had ended their relationship after 17 years.

== Filmography ==
=== Film ===
Year	Title	Role	Type
1977	The Love Letters from Teralba Road	Maureen	Short film
1978	A Mill of Hooks		Film short
1981	Winter of Our Dreams		Feature film
1981	The Counterforce		Film short
1981	To Play Insane	Role unknown	Film short
1982	Gospel Galoshes		Film short
1982	Mind Over Matter		Film short
1982	Midnite Spares	Ruth Mintos	Feature film
1983	Phar Lap	Emma Woodcock (credited as Georgia Carr)	Feature film
1983	Dinner with Patrick		Film short
1984	Annie's Coming Out	Narrator	Feature film
1985	A Decade of Women		Film short
1985	The Coca-Cola Kid	Chambermaid	Feature film
1985	Bliss	Lucy Joy	Feature film
1986	Backlash	Nikki Iceton	Feature film
1989	The Third Wave		Film short
1992	Greenkeeping	Gina	Feature film
1992	Strictly Ballroom	Liz Holt	Feature film
1992	Daydream Believer (aka The Girl Who Came Late)	Wendy	Feature film
1993	For Whose Sake	Role unknown	Film short
1994	Lucky Break aka Paperback Romance	Sophie	Feature film
1995	Bad Company	Julie Ames	Feature film
1996	The Cottonwood	Kathy	Feature film
1996	Two If by Sea	Joan Rappaport (uncredited)	Feature film
1996	Brilliant Lies	Susy Connor	Feature film
1997	Lifebreath	Gale Pullman	Feature film
1998	Primary Colors	Cashmere McLeod	Feature film
1998	Letters from a Killer	Lita	Feature film
1999	Austin Powers: The Spy Who Shagged Me	Robin Swallows	Feature film
2000	The Extreme Adventures of Super Dave	Sandy	Video
2000	Maze	Julianne	Feature film
2001	Jack the Dog	Georgia	Feature film
2002	My Big Fat Greek Wedding	Cousin Nikki	Feature film
2003	Exposed	Jade Blake	Feature film
2005	One Last Thing...	Madelene	Feature film
2006	Thank Heaven	Cybil	Feature film
2006	Stick It	Alice Graham	Feature film
2007	The Trap	Clara	Film short
2009	Year One	Queen	Feature film
2011	In Loco Parentis	Mum	Film short
2011	Burning Man	Carol	Feature film
2015	This Isn't Funny	Gillian Jones	Feature film
2016	My Big Fat Greek Wedding 2	Cousin Nikki	Feature film
2016	Joe Cinque's Consolation	Maria Cinque	Feature film
2018	We Only Know So Much	Trudy	Feature film
2021	Back to the Outback	Doreen (voice)	Feature Film
2023	My Big Fat Greek Wedding 3	Cousin Nikki	Feature film
2024	Nugget is Dead: A Christmas Story	Jodie	Feature film
2025	In Your Dreams	Nightmara (voice)	Feature film

=== Television ===
Year	Title	Role	Type
1978	The Restless Years		TV series, 1 episode
1983	A Country Practice	Tracy Power	TV series, 2 episodes: "Hair of the Dog: Part 1"; Episode: "Hair of the Dog: Part 2"
1985	Five Mile Creek	Beth	TV series, 1 episode: "Maggie"
1986	Studio 86		TV series, 2 episodes: "Strawberry Girl"; Episode: "Sisters in the Bathroom"
1988	Willesee's Australians	Winnie O'Sullivan	TV film series, 1 episode: "Les Darcy"
1989	Inside Running		TV series, 1 episode
1990	Rafferty's Rules	Sally	TV series, 1 episode
1991	Boys from the Bush	Maria	TV series, 2 episodes: "The Stuffed Platypus"; Episode: "Poetic Galah"
1991	Acropolis Now	Haroula	TV series, 1 episode: "The Goddess"
1992	The Resting Place	Sally	TV film short
1992	In Sydney Today	Guest	TV series, 1 episode
1992	Ultraman: Towards the Future	Jean Echo	TV series, 13 episodes
1992–93	Police Rescue	Helena Angelopoulos	TV series, 7 episodes
1993	Seven Deadly Sins		TV series, 1 episode: "Gluttony"
1995	The Adventures of Captain Zoom in Outer Space	Vesper, Vox's High Priestess	TV movie
1997	ER	Suzanne Alner	TV series, 1 episode: "You Bet Your Life"
1997	Firehouse	Charlotte Brooks	TV movie
1997	The Devil's Child	Eva	TV movie
1999	A Secret Affair	Mimi	TV movie
2002	The Dragon Chronicles		TV series
2003	My Big Fat Greek Life	Nikki	7 episodes
2003	Gladius	Additional Voices	Video game
2005	Without a Trace	Stephanie Patterson	TV series, 1 episode: "4.0"
2008–09	East of Everything	Melanie Freedman	TV series, 10 episodes
2011	Small Time Gangster	Darlene	TV series, 8 episodes
2017; 2019	Big Little Lies	Melissa	TV series, 9 episodes
2017	Twin Peaks	Hannah	TV series, 1 episode
2017	The Librarians	Lenore Jones	TV series, 1 episode
2020	Filthy Rich	Veronica	TV series, 6 episodes
2021	911	Sandra	TV series; 1 episode
2023	HouseBroken	Tugboat	TV series; 1 episode
2024–present	Austin	Mel Hogan	TV series: 16 episodes

=== Self appearances ===
Year	Titles	Role	Notes
2022	7 News Spotlight: Strictly Ballroom	Herself (with Strictly Ballroom cast)	TV series, 1 episode
2018	LAGFF Orpheus Awards 2018	Presenter	TV special
2009	Inside Film Awards	Herself	TV special
2009	Australia Unites: The Victorian Bushfire Appeal	Herself (with Anthony LaPaglia)	TV special
2006	David Tench Tonight	Guest	TV series, 1 episode
1994	Good Morning Australia	Guest	TV series
1994	At Home	Guest	TV series, 1 episode
1994	Ernie and Denise	Guest	TV series, 1 episode
1994	Real Life	Guest	TV series, 1 episode
1992	The 1992 Australian Film Institute Awards	Herself - Winner	TV special
1980	Drink Drive	Herself	Film documentary
1980	Smoking	Herself	Film documentary
