= Bess Meisler =

American actress (born 1922)

- Born: Bessie Alalouf; July 19, 1922 (age 103); New York City, U.S.
- Occupation: Actress
- Years active: 1980–2016
- Known for: Nana Yiayia in the My Big Fat Greek Wedding franchise (2002-2016)
- Spouse: Seymour Meisler (m. 1943; div. 1962)
- Children: 1

Bess Meisler (born July 19, 1922) is an American actress best known for her role as Yiayia in the My Big Fat Greek Wedding film series. Starting her screen career at the age of 65, Meisler has become a notable figure for her comedic timing and portrayals of elderly characters in both film and television.

== Early life ==
Meisler was born on July 19, 1922, in New York as Bessie Alalouf. Her parents were both immigrant Greek Jews. Her parents were Avraam and Perla Alalouf who were fruit dealers. She had two other siblings, a brother named Emmanuel who died in 1998 and a sister named Esther who died in 1987.

Her passion for acting led her to the theater, where she made her Broadway debut in 1981 in the revival of Fiddler on the Roof. In this production, she served as a swing actor, covering roles such as Shandel, and understudying for characters like Golde and Yente.

== Career ==
Meisler transitioned to on-screen acting in 1987, making her television debut at the age of 65 in the series Hunter, where she portrayed Mrs. Petelli. She continued to take on minor roles in television throughout the 1990s, including appearances in Flying Blind and Beverly Hills, 90210.

Her breakthrough came in 2002 with the role of Yiayia, the eccentric grandmother in My Big Fat Greek Wedding. The film's success brought her widespread recognition. She reprised this role in the sequel, My Big Fat Greek Wedding 2, released in 2016. In addition, Meisler appeared in films such as Daddy Day Care (2003), Room 6 (2006), and The Perfect Family (2011). Her television credits include guest roles in Malcolm in the Middle, The Comeback, and Eagleheart.

== Personal life ==
Meisler married Seymour Meisler, an Ashkenazi Jew, in 1943 until their divorce in 1962. They had a daughter named Phyllis who is residing with her mother in Southern California.

== Filmography ==
- My Big Fat Greek Wedding 2 (2016) - Grandmother Yiayia
- The Perfect Family (2011) - Greta Russert
- Eagleheart (2011) - Evelyn
- A Kiss at Midnight (2008) - Mrs. Moskovitz
- The Memory Thief (2007) - Joanna Kaufman
- Room 6 (2006) - Ellen
- Jake in Progress (2006) - Barbara
- The Comeback (2005)
- Malcolm in the Middle (2005) - Gorga
- Becker (2003)
- Daddy Day Care (2003) - Old Gypsy Woman
- My Big Fat Greek Wedding (2002) - Grandmother Yiayia
- Beverly Hills, 90210 (1998) - Rose Zuckerman
- Flying Blind (1992) - Grandma
- Hunter (1987–1990) - Mrs. Petelli/Unger's Maid
