= Bruce Gray =

Canadian actor (1936–2017)

- Gray as Sky Marshall Dienes in Starship Troopers (1997)
- Born: Robert Bruce Gray; September 7, 1936; San Juan, Puerto Rico
- Died: December 13, 2017 (aged 81); Los Angeles, California U.S
- Occupation: Actor
- Years active: 1966–2017

Bruce Gray (September 7, 1936 – December 13, 2017) was a Canadian actor, known for multiple roles in films and television shows for over five decades.

== Early years ==
Gray was born in Puerto Rico and lived in Toronto after 1949. He graduated from Humberside Collegiate and from the University of Toronto with a Master's in Psychology. While at the University of Toronto, he was an active member of Phi Delta Theta fraternity.

== Acting career ==
Following a small role in the 1966 film Adulterous Affair, Gray worked steadily from 1978 onwards, appearing in both Canadian and American-based film and television productions.

He may be best known to Canadian audiences for his four seasons as investment banker Adam Cunningham on the Global series Traders (1996–2000). He also gained attention as the father of the groom in My Big Fat Greek Wedding, the recurring role of Judge J.E. Reilly on the television serial Passions and the ghost of Joe's father on the television show Medium.

Gray appeared in a number of science fiction themed productions. He portrayed Sky Marshall Dienes in the movie version of Starship Troopers, an interrogator of Captain John Sheridan on Babylon 5, Vulcan philosopher Surak on Star Trek: Enterprise. He appeared several times on Star Trek: The Next Generation and Star Trek: Deep Space Nine as Admiral Chekote.

He appeared on a number of soap operas and serials. Two important roles were that of Wyatt Coles on All My Children (playing the husband in a child-abusing couple) and Owen Madison, the husband of Kim Hunter’s character on The Edge of Night.

He also had a guest-starring role on the cable television series Queer as Folk, playing gay millionaire George Schickel.

Gray was the face of the leader of a fictitious anti-Amsterdam organization in a print and internet advertising campaign for Amstel beer.

== Death ==
Gray died of cancer on December 13, 2017, at the age of 81.

== Filmography ==
=== Film ===
Title	Year	Role	Notes
Adulterous Affair	1966	Russ	
Odd Birds	1985	Gower Champion	
Let's Get Harry	1986	Ambassador Douglas	
Dragnet	1987	Mayor Parvin	
Eye of the Storm	1991	Father	
For the Boys	1991	Sponsor #1, New York	
My Family	1995	Mr. Gillespie	
Up Close & Personal	1996	Gabe Lawrence	
Spy Hard	1996	The President	
Traveler's Rest	1996	Marty	
The Peacemaker	1997	CNN Newscaster	
Starship Troopers	1997	Sky Marshall Dienes	
Whatever It Takes	1998	Carl Lica	
Dementia	1999	Uncle George	
My Big Fat Greek Wedding	2002	Rodney Miller	
Cube 2: Hypercube	2002	Colonel Thomas H. Maguire	
S.W.A.T.	2003	Mr. Richard Segerstrom	
Dark Waters	2003	Summerville	
Monster-in-Law	2005	TV Executive	
Cake	2005	Malcolm McGee	
Evan Almighty	2007	Congressman Hughes	
Is It Just Me?	2010	Ernie	
Water for Elephants	2011	Proctor	
Crazy Eyes	2012	Lawyer	
All That Remains	2013	Stan Kucharski	Short
Tentacle 8	2014	Man in Fisherman's Hat	
Crimson Peak	2015	Ferguson	
My Big Fat Greek Wedding 2	2016	Rodney Miller	
Rules Don't Apply	2016	Baptist Preacher	
Hard Corps	2016	Hal	
Don't Talk to Irene	2017	Charles	Final film role

=== Television ===
Title	Year	Role	Notes
Breaking Up	1978	Vic	TV movie
The Edge of Night	1979-1980	Owen Madison	89 episodes
Dallas	1981-1991	David Stanley / Dr. Alan Cosby / Richard Mertz	6 episodes
Drop-Out Father	1982	Austin Morrow	TV movie
Knots Landing	1982-1984	Lawyer / Senator Riker / T.J. Escott	3 episodes
For Love and Honor	1983	Maj. Nordoff	TV movie
Emerald Point N.A.S.	1983	Admiral Goddard	2 episodes
Invitation to Hell	1984	Larry Ferris	TV movie
Murder, She Wrote	1984-1994	Ted Hartley / Dean Merrill / R. L. Pierson	5 episodes
The Young and the Restless	1986	Mark Wilcox	4 episodes
Alfred Hitchcock Presents	1986-1989	Billy Pearson / Bryan Holland	2 episodes
LBJ: The Early Years	1987	—N/a	TV movie
Captain Power and the Soldiers of the Future	1987-1988	Dr. Stuart Power / Mentor	11 episodes
Tour of Duty	1988	Lt. Col. Dalby	4 episodes
Drop-Out Mother	1988	—N/a	TV movie
Matlock	1988-1991	James Hamilton / Mr. Reese	4 episodes
Generations	1989	Phillip Webb	19 episodes
Sinatra	1992	Fred Zinneman	2 episodes
A Murderous Affair: The Carolyn Warmus Story	1992	William Aaronwald	TV movie
Dead Ahead: The Exxon Valdez Disaster	1992	Gov. Steve Cowper	TV movie
Picket Fences	1993	Mr. Fenn	2 episodes
J.F.K.: Reckless Youth	1993	Alex Kirk	2 episodes
A Perry Mason Mystery: The Case of the Lethal Lifestyle	1994	Amos Moore	TV movie
Roswell	1994	Admiral	TV movie
Legacy of Sin: The William Coit Story	1995	Ed Holm	TV movie
Melrose Place	1995-1997	Mr. Fielding's Doctor / Tom	2 episodes
Traders	1996-2000	Adam Cunningham	83 episodes
Babylon 5	1997	Interrogator	2 episodes
Thanks of a Grateful Nation	1998	Sen. Rockefeller	TV movie
Life of the Party: The Pamela Harriman Story	1998	Fielding	TV movie
Dangerous Evidence: The Lori Jackson Story	1999	Colonel Harry	TV movie
Happy Face Murders	1999	Ephraim Quince	TV movie
When Andrew Came Home	2000	Dr. Matthews	TV movie
The Last Debate	2000	Governor Paul L. Greene	TV movie
A Glimpse of Hell	2001	Donald Meyer	TV movie
Two for One	2001	Mr. Miller	TV movie
The Red Sneakers	2002	Final Game Referee	TV movie
Torso: The Evelyn Dick Story	2002	Third Trial Judge	TV movie
Queer as Folk	2002	George Schickel	5 episodes
JAG	2002	Brigadier General Sawyer	Episode: "Head to Toe"
A Killing Spring	2002	Ed Kramer	TV movie
Wall of Secrets	2003	Milton	TV movie
Playmakers	2003	Gene Wilbanks	11 episodes
Chasing Freedom	2004	Philip Laughton	TV movie
Charmed	2005	Kheel / Male Elder	2 episodes
Medium	2005-2011	Joe's Dad	11 episodes
Live Once, Die Twice	2006	Earl MacDuff	TV movie
The Bold and the Beautiful	2006	Judge Morrissey	2 episodes
Recount	2008	Justice Anthony Kennedy	TV movie
Anatomy of Hope	2009	Dr. Lawson	TV movie
How I Met Your Mother	2011-2012	Yuthers / Senior Partner	4 episodes
Falling Skies	2011	Uncle Scott	8 episodes
Sons of Anarchy	2012	Dr. Hacker	Episode: "Small World"
The Firm	2012	Nicholas Kinross	Episode: "Chapter Seventeen"
Castle	2012	Charles Carson	Episode: "A Dance with Death"
The Listener	2014	Judge Griffin	Episode: "In Our Midst"
Married Without Kids	2015	—N/a	Episode: "Dr. Barren"
Dig	2015	Issac Zohar	Episode: "Sisters of Dinah"
Charming Christmas	2015	Harold Rossman	TV movie
Timeless	2017	Old Ethan Cahill	Episode: "The Red Scare"
Good Witch	2017	Pete	Episode: "Good Witch Spellbound"
Chateau Laurier	2018	Mr. Mutchmur	Episode: "A Found Bride", (final appearance)

=== Video games ===
Title	Year	Role	Notes
The Inpatient	2018	Dr. Jefferson Bragg	PlayStation VR game

== See also ==
- List of Puerto Ricans
