= Nia Vardalos =

Canadian-Greek actress and screenwriter (born 1962)

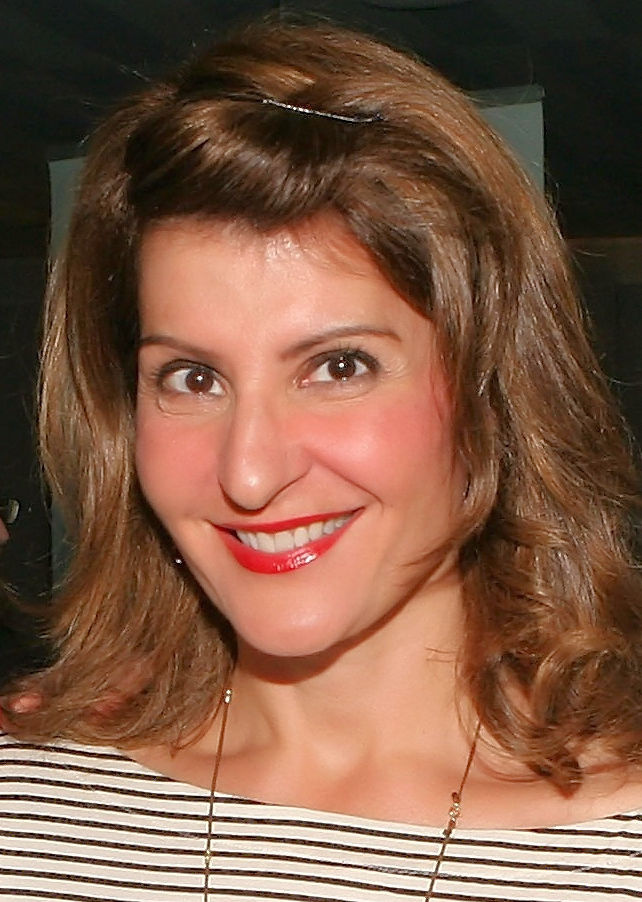
- Vardalos in 2011
- Born: Antonia Eugenia Vardalos; September 24, 1962 (age 64); Winnipeg, Manitoba, Canada
- Education: Toronto Metropolitan University (BFA)
- Occupations: Actress; comedian; screenwriter; director; producer
- Years active: 1996–present
- Spouse: Ian Gomez (m. 1993; div. 2018)
- Children: 1

Antonia Eugenia "Nia" Vardalos (Note: /ˈniːə vɑːrˈdæləs/ NEE-ə var-DAL-əs; Greek: Αντωνία Ευγενία "Νία" Βαρντάλος, romanized: Antonía Evgenía "Nía" Varntálos, pronounced [(andoˈni.a evʝe)ˈni.a varˈdalos].) (born September 24, 1962) is a Canadian actress and screenwriter. She starred in and wrote the romantic comedy film My Big Fat Greek Wedding (2002), which garnered her nominations for the Academy Award for Best Original Screenplay and the Golden Globe Award for Best Actress – Motion Picture Comedy or Musical, and which went on to spawn a media franchise.

== Early life ==
Vardalos was born in Winnipeg, Manitoba, on September 24, 1962. She is the daughter of Greek-Canadian parents Doreen Christakos, a bookkeeper and homemaker, and Constantine "Gus" Vardalos, a land developer who was born in Kalavryta. She attended St. George School and Shaftesbury High School in Winnipeg and Toronto Metropolitan University in Toronto.

== Career ==
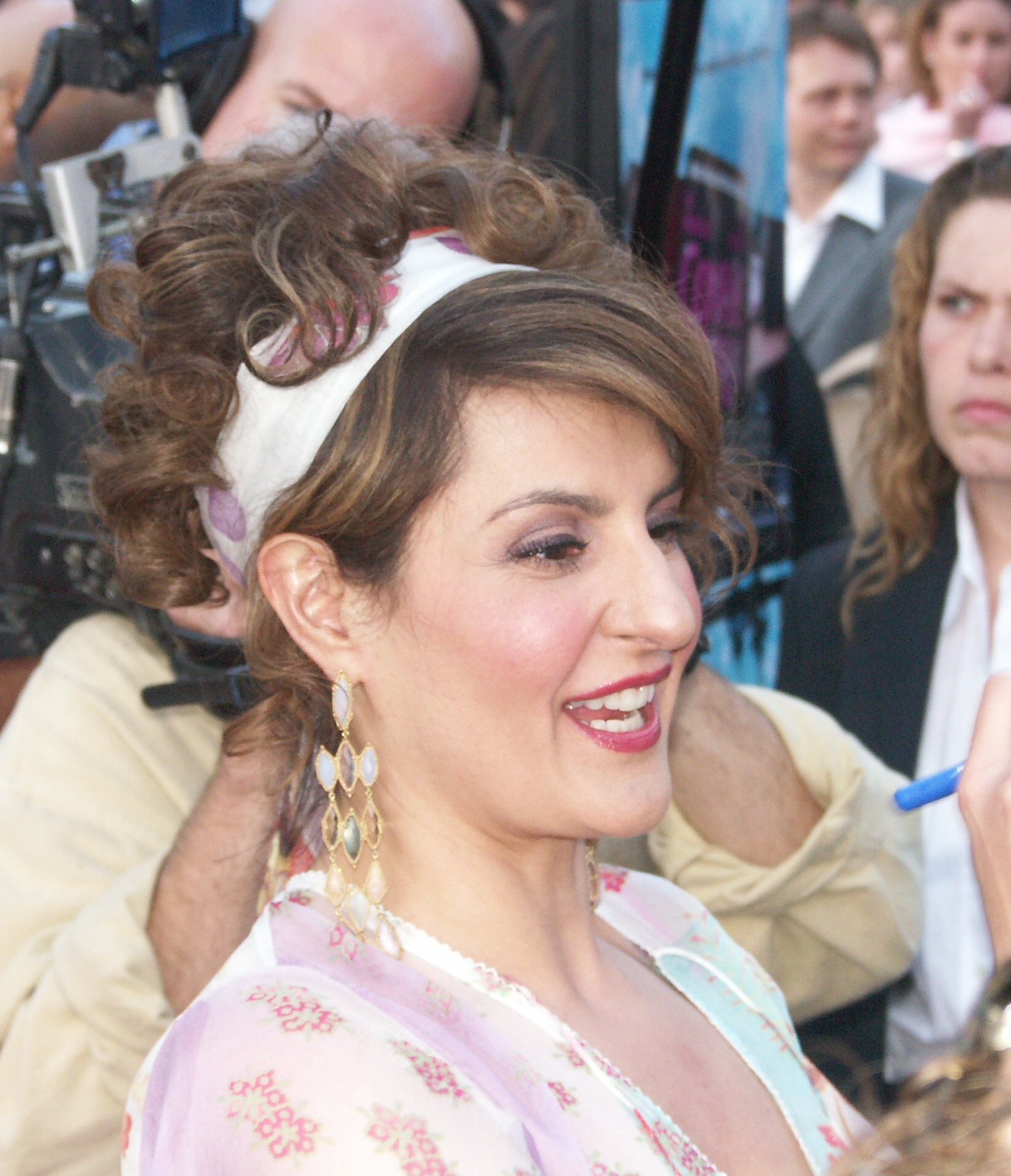
Vardalos at the Connie and Carla premiere on the Universal City Walk, Los Angeles, April 2004

An alumna of the Chicago-based Second City comedy repertory company, Vardalos wrote and performed in over ten revues of sketch comedy and won Chicago's Joseph Jefferson award for Best Actress. Vardalos had many small roles in television shows such as The Drew Carey Show and Two Guys and a Girl; in addition, she provided voices for the 1996 radio adaptation of Star Wars: Return of the Jedi which Brian Daley had written for National Public Radio.

She gained fame with her movie about a woman's struggle to find love in My Big Fat Greek Wedding. First performed as a one-woman show of the same name, the film was a critical and commercial success. The film earned Vardalos an Academy Award nomination for Best Writing, a Golden Globe nomination for Best Actress in a Motion Picture Musical or Comedy and a Screen Actors Guild Award nomination. The sleeper hit quickly became one of the highest-grossing independent films of all time, and the number one romantic comedy of all time. Vardalos hosted Saturday Night Live in the fall of 2002.

The next film she starred in, which she also wrote, and in which she also sang and danced, was Connie and Carla (2004) about two women pretending to be drag queens. (The plot has been compared to that of Some Like It Hot, the 1959 American romantic comedy film by Billy Wilder, in that the female leads of Connie and Carla were hiding from criminals whose crimes they had witnessed and who could still kill both of them had they been found.)

Vardalos made her directorial debut in 2009 with the independent feature I Hate Valentine's Day. The film, about a florist finding romance, was made for less than $400,000 and grossed $1,985,260 on a limited release at the international box-office. This was followed by My Life in Ruins, about a misguided tour-guide traveling around Greece and featuring Academy Award winner Richard Dreyfuss. The film was the first American production given permission to film at the Acropolis of Athens; Vardalos personally sought the approval from the Greek government and credits her years of Greek School for helping her be fluent in the language.

In 2011, Vardalos collaborated with Tom Hanks to write the romantic comedy film Larry Crowne for the screen, which grossed $59.8 million; Vardalos also voiced the character Map Genie in the film.

In 2016, Vardalos adapted Cheryl Strayed's beloved book, Tiny Beautiful Things, and starred in the sold out run of the play at The Public Theater in New York, directed by Thomas Kail. Vardalos reprised her role in 2017 at The Public, and again at the Pasadena Playhouse in California.

Vardalos joined many celebrities helping to produce The 1 Second Film art project; she herself was featured in The Dialogue, an interview series. In this 90 minute interview with producer Mike DeLuca, Vardalos talked about how her experiences in The Second City comedy troupe helped her as an actress and a screenwriter, and how the unofficial "tell-the-Greek" word-of-mouth program had a hand in catapulting her movie to such great heights. She sang The Beatles song "Golden Slumbers" on the 2006 charity album Unexpected Dreams – Songs from the Stars.

Vardalos starred in and wrote My Big Fat Greek Wedding 2, which was released in March 2016. It earned over $60 million domestically from an $18 million budget.

From 2015 to 2017, Vardalos and Gomez co-presented the first two seasons of The Great American Baking Show, formerly known as The Great Holiday Baking Show, for ABC-TV.

In 2018, Vardalos guest-starred in an episode of The CW series Crazy Ex-Girlfriend.

In 2019, Vardalos played Faye Anderson in the ABC television holiday film Same Time, Next Christmas. In 2020, in what was, for her, a rare turn to both dramatic acting and a portrayal of a real person, she played convicted poisoner Stacey Castor in the made-for-television movie Poisoned Love: The Stacey Castor Story, which Lifetime Television transmitted.

In September 2022, Vardalos, along with comedian Rob Riggle, created, wrote, and starred in the 10 episode comedy podcast Motivated! for Audible Original and Broadway Video.

In 2023, Vardalos reprised her role as Toula Portakalos in My Big Fat Greek Wedding 3 for which she served as director and screenwriter. That same year, she guest starred in the midseason finale of the first part of season three of the television series Chucky as Evelyn Elliot, a fellow death row inmate in Texas.

== Personal life ==
In September 1993, Vardalos married American actor Ian Gomez. After trying for nine years to conceive through IVF and surrogacy, Vardalos and Gomez adopted their child in 2008. At the time the child was three years old and part of the foster care system. In 2013, Vardalos wrote a book about the experience, a New York Times bestseller she titled Instant Mom, and she donated all the proceeds from its royalties to adoption groups. Vardalos also wrote an advice column about the adoption process in The Huffington Post.

On July 3, 2018, it was announced that Vardalos had filed for divorce from Gomez after 25 years of marriage. The couple separated in June 2017.

== Filmography ==
=== Film ===
Year	Title	Role	Notes
1996	No Experience Necessary	Sheila	
1997	Men Seeking Women	Iris	
1999	Meet Prince Charming	Jennifer	
2002	My Big Fat Greek Wedding	Toula Portokalos	Also writer As writer: American Screenwriters Association Award - Discover Screenwriting Award; Washington D.C. Area Film Critics Association Award for Best Original Screenplay; Nominated - Academy Award for Best Original Screenplay; Nominated - Broadcast Film Critics Association Award for Best Writer; Nominated - London Film Critics' Circle Award for Screenwriter of the Year; Nominated - Phoenix Film Critics Society Award for Best Original Screenplay; Nominated - Satellite Award for Best Adapted Screenplay; Nominated - Writers Guild of America Award for Best Original Screenplay; As actress: Independent Spirit Award for Best Debut Performance; Phoenix Film Critics Society Award for Best Newcomer; Nominated - Golden Globe Award for Best Actress - Motion Picture Comedy or Musical; Nominated - Online Film Critics Society Award for Best Breakthrough Performance; Nominated - Satellite Award for Best Actress – Motion Picture Musical or Comedy; Nominated - MTV Movie Award for Female Breakthrough Performance; Nominated - Screen Actors Guild Award for Outstanding Performance by a Cast in a Motion Picture
2004	Connie and Carla	Connie	Also writer
2006	Greece: Secrets of the Past	Narrator	Short documentary film
2009	My Life in Ruins	Georgia Yanokoupolis	
2009	I Hate Valentine's Day	Genevieve	Also writer and director
2011	Larry Crowne	Map Genie (voice)	Also co-writer
2012	For a Good Time, Call...	Rachel Rodman	
2012	An American Girl: McKenna Shoots for the Stars	Mrs. Brooks	
2013	Dealin' with Idiots	Ava Morris	
2014	Helicopter Mom	Maggie	
2015	Car Dogs	Sharon	
2016	My Big Fat Greek Wedding 2	Toula Portokalos	Also writer
2018	Charming	Nemeny Neverwish (voice)	
2019	Wonder Woman: Bloodlines	Julia Kapatelis (voice)	
2022	The Curse of Bridge Hollow	Madam Hawthorne	
2023	My Big Fat Greek Wedding 3	Toula Portokalos	Also writer and director
2026	You, Me & Tuscany	Mrs. Dunn	
TBA	Nutmeg & Mistletoe †	TBA	Post-production

=== Television ===
Year	Title	Role	Notes
1996	High Incident	Uncredited	Episode: "Father Knows Best"
1996	Common Law	Uncredited	Episode: "In the Matter of, Acceptance"
1997	The Drew Carey Show	Grace Almada	Episode: "Strange Bedfellows"
1997–1998	Team Knight Rider	Domino (voice)	22 episodes
1998–1999	Boy Meets World	Miss Gallagher	2 episodes
1999	It's Like, You Know...	Mindy	Episode: "Memories of Me"
1999	Two Guys and a Girl	Evelyn	Episode: "Career Day"
2000	Curb Your Enthusiasm	Larry's Lawyer	Episode: "Interior Decorator"
2002	Saturday Night Live	Host	Episode: "Nia Vardalos/Eve"
2003	My Big Fat Greek Life	Nia Portokalos	Writer and executive producer; 7 episodes
2008	My Boys	Jo	3 episodes
2009	Drop Dead Diva	Lisa Shane	Episode: "What If?"
2010	The Good Guys	Eileen	Episode: "Pilot"
2011	Cougar Town	Angela Torres	Episode: "Damaged by Love"
2012	Grey's Anatomy	Karen	Episode: "Hope for the Hopeless"
2013–2026	Law & Order: Special Victims Unit	Minonna Efron	5 episodes
2015	Marry Me	Pam	Episode: "Mom Me"
2015	Jane the Virgin	Barbara Stanbrook	Episode: "Chapter Nineteen"
2015–2017	The Great American Baking Show	Co-Host	12 episodes
2015–2019	Star vs. the Forces of Evil	Angie Diaz	Voice role; 10 episodes
2016	The Catch	Leah Wells	3 episodes
2016	Graves	Annie Spiro	7 episodes
2017	Dr. Ken	Tiffany	Episode: "Ken's Big Audition"
2018	Crazy Ex-Girlfriend	Wendy Legrand	Episode: "I'm On My Own Path"
2018–2020	DuckTales	Selene	Voice role; 4 episodes
2019	Same Time, Next Christmas	Faye Anderson	Television film
2020	Poisoned Love: The Stacey Castor Story	Stacey Castor	Television film
2021	Station 19	Patricia	Episode: "100% or Nothing"
2022	Love, Victor	Theresa	Episode: "Fast Times At Creekwood High"
2022	Guillermo del Toro's Cabinet of Curiosities	Madame Levine	Episode: "Dreams in the Witch House"
2023	Chucky	Evelyn Elliot	Episode: "Dressed to Kill"
2025	Hacks	Daisy	Episode: "Big, Brave Girl"
2025	Mickey Mouse Funhouse	Sally Sphinx	Voice, episode: "Mickey and the Cozy Fleece"

== Stage ==
Year	Title	Role	Venue	Ref.
1982	The Music Man	Performer	Rainbow Stage, Winnipeg	
1984	Kismet	Ayah	Rainbow Stage, Winnipeg	
1998	My Big Fat Greek Wedding	Performer	Globe Theatre, Los Angeles	
2014	Company	Jenny	Theatre 20, Toronto	
2016	Tiny Beautiful Things	Sugar	The Public Theater, Off-Broadway	
2017	Tiny Beautiful Things	Sugar	The Public Theater, Off-Broadway	
2019	Tiny Beautiful Things	Sugar	Pasadena Playhouse, Los Angeles	
2025	Pen Pals	Bernadette	Theatre at St. Clements, Off-Broadway	
