= Paugnut Forest Administration Building =

- U.S. National Register of Historic Places
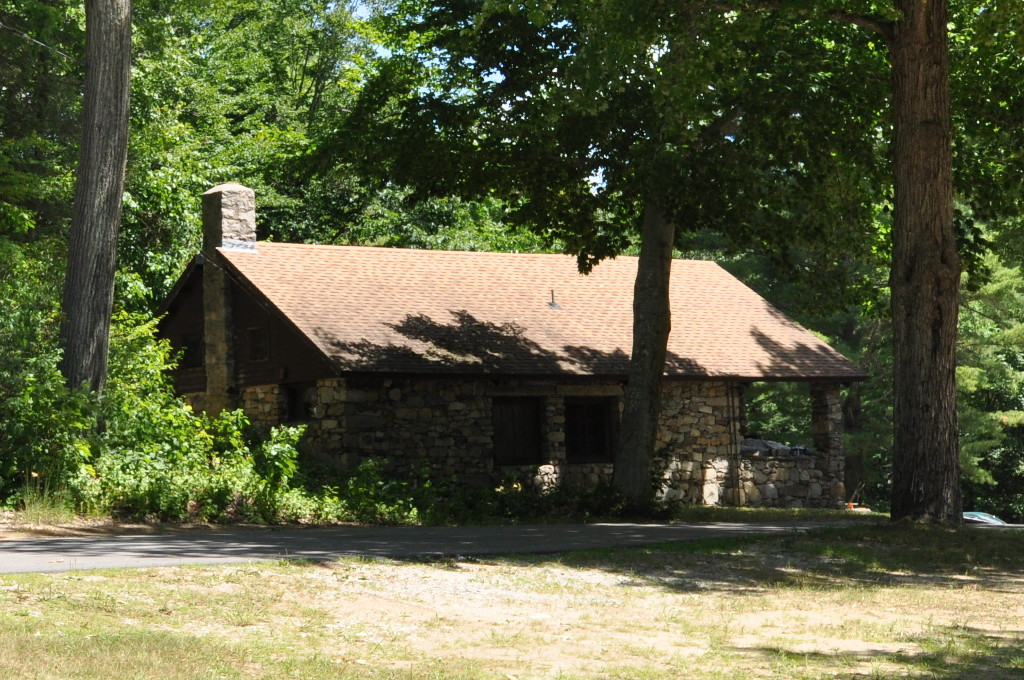

- Location within Connecticut Location within the United States
- Location: 385 Burr Mountain Road, Burr Pond State Park, Torrington, Connecticut
- Coordinates: 41°52′13″N 73°5′34″W
- Area: 0.7 acres (0.28 ha)
- Built: 1937
- Built by: Civilian Conservation Corps
- Architectural style: Bungalow/craftsman
- MPS: Connecticut State Park and Forest Depression-Era Federal Work Relief Programs Structures TR
- NRHP reference No.: 86001736
- Added to NRHP: September 5, 1986

The Paugnut Forest Administration Building (also known as Burr Pond Park Bungalow) is a historic building at 385 Burr Mountain Road in Burr Pond State Park, Torrington, Connecticut. Built in 1937 by a crew of the Civilian Conservation Corps (CCC), it is one of the finest examples of Bungalow/Craftsman architecture built by the CCC in the state. It was listed on the National Register of Historic Places in 1986.

== Description and history ==
The Paugnut Forest Administration Building is located on the east side of Burr Pond State Park, in a cluster of administrative buildings located on the site of the former CCC camp. This area is located northeast of the main parking and beach area of the park. The building is a 1-1/2 story structure, built of stone and wood, and covered by a cross-gabled roof. It has a T shape, with a deeply set porch under the east-facing gable. Its walls are mainly rubblestone, as are the porch supports. Roughly dressed granite steps lead to the porch at the center. The gable above the porch has exposed wooden rafters, and bracing beams at its front.

Burr Pond State Park, which is surrounded by Paugnut State Forest, was acquired by the state in 1929 from the Borden family, who had operated a milk condensing factory, the first of its type, on the pond's shore. The facilities of the park were largely established by the CCC crews established in the camp between 1933 and 1937. This building served as the administrative headquarters for the camp, and has seen a variety of mainly administrative uses by the state parks department since then. It is one of the best-preserved CCC-built buildings in the state.

== See also ==
- National Register of Historic Places listings in Litchfield County, Connecticut
