= Water Street Historic District (Torrington, Connecticut) =

Historic district in Connecticut, United States

- U.S. National Register of Historic Places
- U.S. Historic district
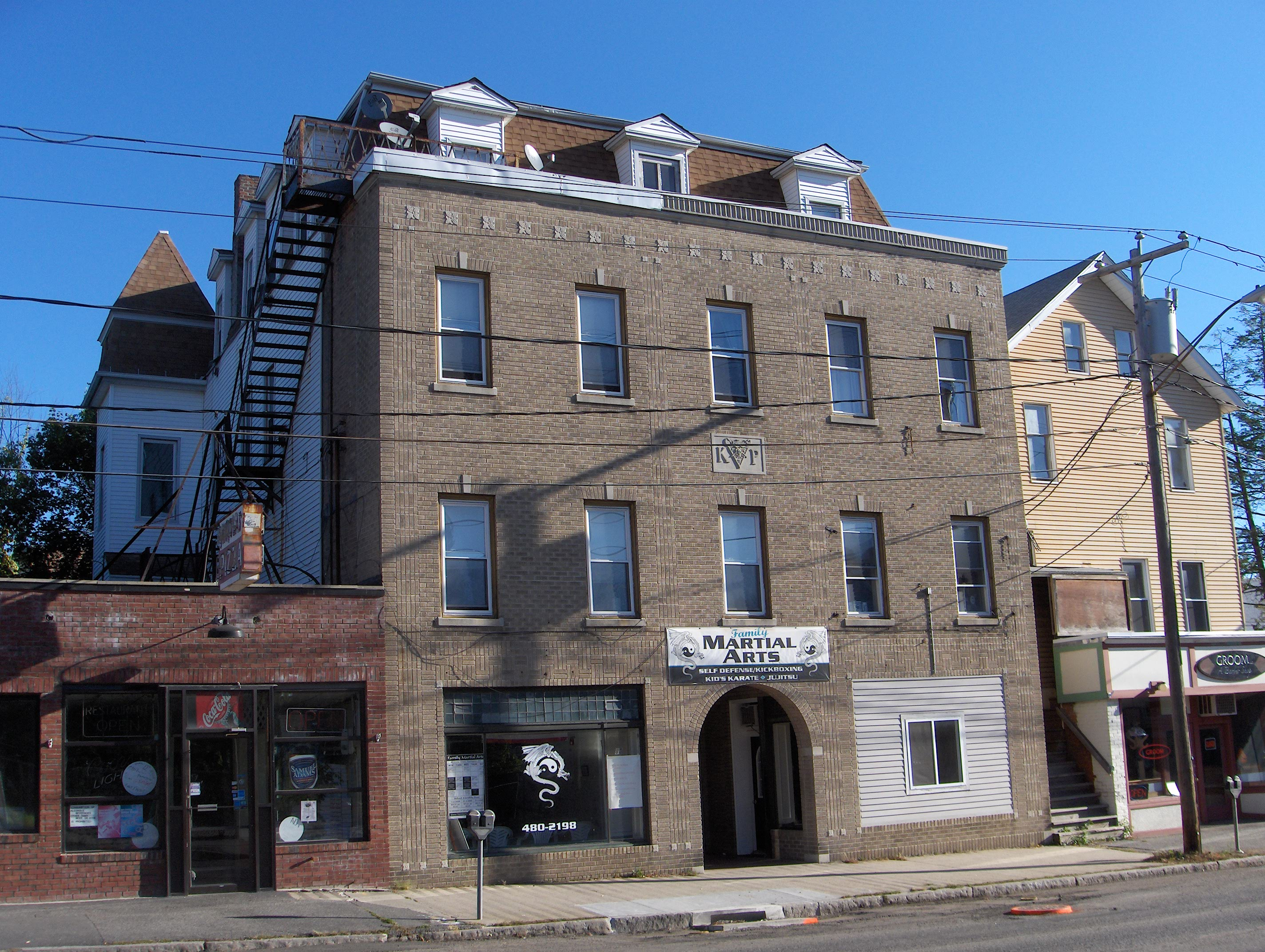
- Former Knights of Pythias building

- Location within Connecticut Location within the United States
- Location: Roughly along Water Street, from Church Street to Prospect Street, Torrington, Connecticut
- Coordinates: 41°48′9″N 73°7′35″W
- Area: 20 acres (8.1 ha)
- Architectural style: Greek Revival, Classical Revival, et al.
- NRHP reference No.: 02001698
- Added to NRHP: January 15, 2003

The Water Street Historic District encompasses a historic commercial and industrial area on the west side of downtown Torrington, Connecticut. Extending roughly along Water and Church Streets between the Naugatuck River and Prospect Street, the district includes factory and commercial buildings, as well as the former Torrington Fire Department Headquarters and the civic Knights of Pythias building. Developed between about 1885 and 1920, the district was listed on the National Register of Historic Places in 2003.

== Description and history ==
The Naugatuck River, where it passes through what is now downtown Torrington, was long recognized as a potential source of industrial power, and was first dammed for a sawmill in 1751. Water Street is an early road, joining that sawmill in the west to Main Street in the east. The city's major industries in the 19th century came to be the rolling of brass and the manufacture of brass objects. Growth was spurred by the arrival of the railroad, and in 1857 Charles Hotchkiss established a lumber parts mill, which eventually became a major manufacturer of window sashes and blinds. Although Water Street was at first lined with a combination of houses and commercial buildings, it was transformed into a primarily commercial and industrial area between about 1880 and 1920. The present streetscape is largely the product of that period, altered in part by the loss of some of the industrial buildings to fire and flood.

The historic district is abutted on its eastern end by the Downtown Torrington Historic District. Its southern boundary is the Naugatuck River, extend from the railroad bridge west and northerly to Church Street. It includes a few buildings on Church Street, as well as Railroad Square, which is bounded on the north by Mason Street. There are 34 historically significant buildings in this area, which is about 20 acres (8.1 ha) in size. The oldest buildings include the American Brass Company office, a fine Second Empire building on Water Street which was built in 1881. The railroad depot, built in 1898, is a good example of Renaissance Revival architecture.

== See also ==
- National Register of Historic Places listings in Litchfield County, Connecticut
