= Sunnybrook State Park =

State park in Litchfield County, Connecticut

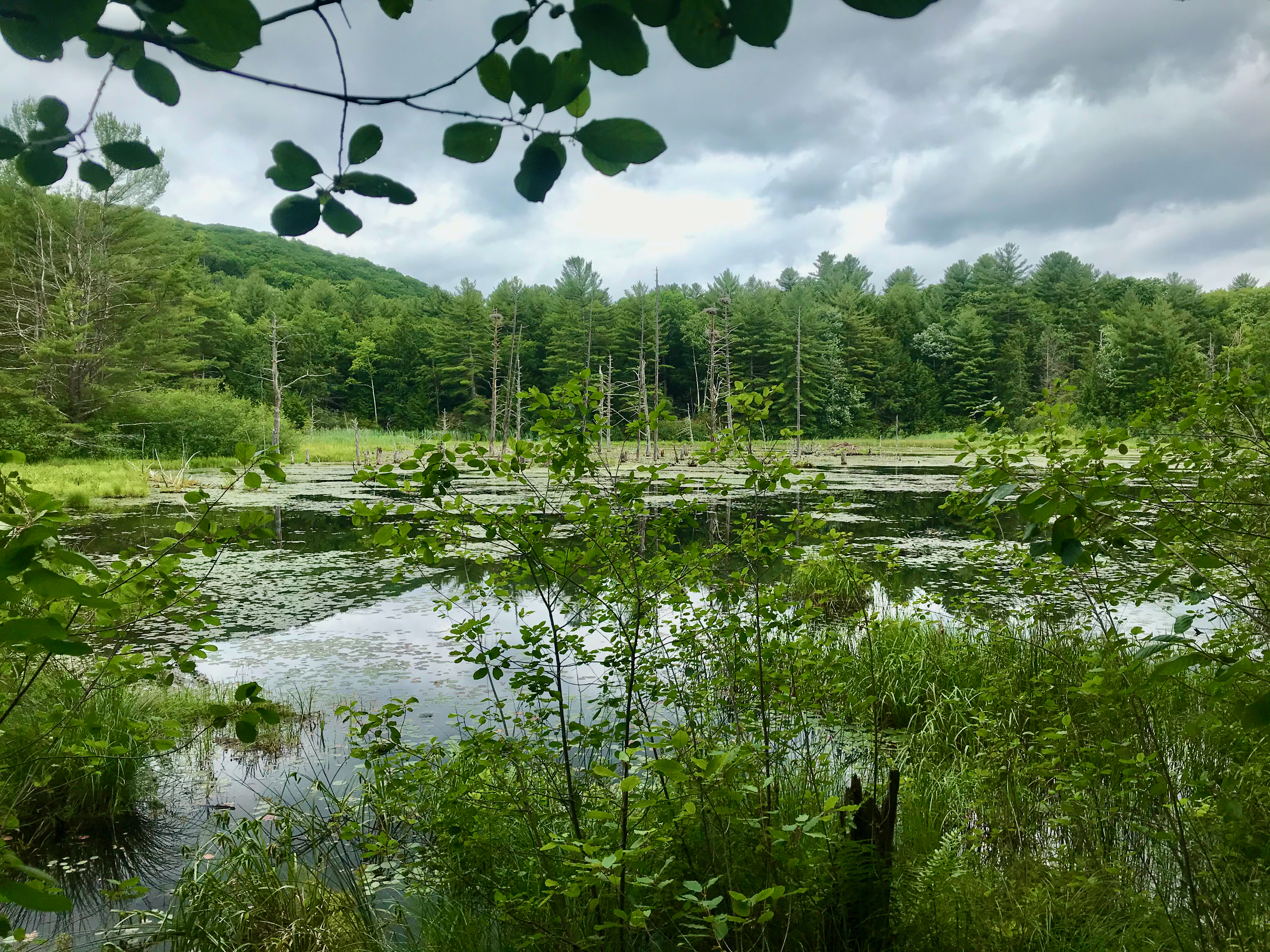
- Madden Pond and surrounding wetlands in Connecticut's Sunny Brook State Park

- Location within Connecticut Location within the United States
- Location: Torrington, Connecticut, United States
- Coordinates: 41°50′09″N 73°07′13″W
- Area: 464 acres (188 ha)
- Elevation: 804 ft (245 m)
- Established: 1970
- Administrator: Connecticut Department of Energy and Environmental Protection
- Designation: Connecticut state park
- Website: Official website

Sunnybrook State Park is a public recreation area encompassing 464 acres (188 ha) in the town of Torrington, Connecticut. The state park is the southwestern terminus for the blue-blazed John Muir Trail which crosses Paugnut State Forest for two miles to the loop trail at Burr Pond State Park. Another park trail bears the name of former property owner Edwin Fadoir. In addition to hiking, the park offers picnicking, hunting, and fishing along the East Branch Naugatuck River. The park opened in 1970 and entered the state rolls in the 1971 edition of the Connecticut Register and Manual.
