= Paugnut State Forest =

Forest located in Connecticut

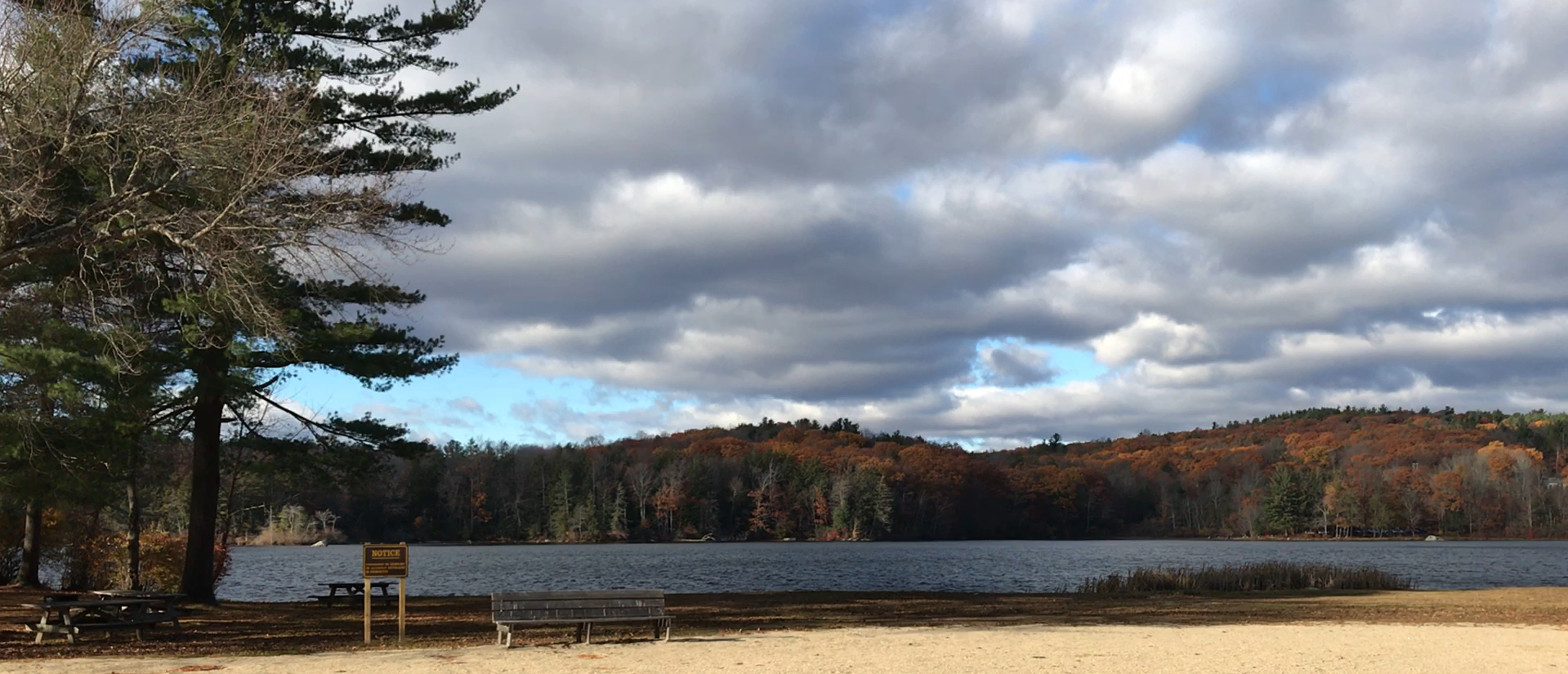
- Burr Pond

- Location within Connecticut Location within the United States
- Location: Torrington and Winchester, Connecticut, United States
- Coordinates: 41°51′21″N 73°06′08″W
- Area: 1,644 acres (665 ha)
- Elevation: 1,099 ft (335 m)
- Established: 1929
- Administrator: Connecticut Department of Energy and Environmental Protection
- Website: Official website

Paugnut State Forest is a Connecticut state forest located on four parcels in the towns of Torrington and Winchester. The forest's Arts and Crafts–style administration building was constructed by the Civilian Conservation Corps in 1937 and has been listed on the National Register of Historic Places. The remains of the foundation of the condensed milk factory established by Gail Borden on Burr Pond in 1857 may also be seen. Trails crossing the forest include the John Muir Trail which connects Burr Pond State Park and Sunnybrook State Park.
