= Warner Theatre (Torrington, Connecticut) =

- U.S. National Register of Historic Places
- U.S. Historic district – Contributing property
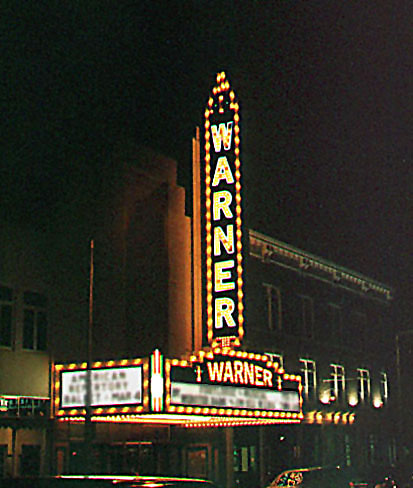

- Location within Connecticut Location within the United States
- Location: 68-82 Main Street, Torrington, Connecticut
- Coordinates: 41°48′6″N 73°7′17″W
- Area: 2.5 acres (1.0 ha)
- Built: 1931
- Architect: Thomas W. Lamb
- Architectural style: Art Deco, Modernistic
- Website: www.warnertheatre.org
- Part of: Downtown Torrington Historic District (ID88002978)
- NRHP reference No.: 84001098

Significant dates
- Added to NRHP: February 16, 1984
- Designated CP: December 22, 1988

The Warner Theatre is an Art-Deco style movie palace located at 68-82 Main Street in Torrington, Connecticut. It opened on August 19, 1931 as part of the Warner Bros. chain of movie theaters. Today it operates as a mixed-use performing arts center. It is individually listed on the National Register of Historic Places and also a contributing property in the Downtown Torrington Historic District.

The theater has been deemed the "finest surviving Modernistic theatre in Connecticut."

== History ==
The Warner Theatre was built as a first-run movie palace by Warner Bros. Studios. This art-deco building was designed by architect Thomas W. Lamb. The opening was a statewide event attended by then-Governor Wilbur Cross and other dignitaries. Seating 1,772 patrons, the Warner was an example of state-of-the-art technology.

In the 1960s Warner Brothers sold the Warner Theatre to a private owner who continued to show movies until the late 1970s. By the early 1980s the theatre was closed and slated for demolition when a group of local citizens banded together and formed what is now known as the Northwest Connecticut Association for the Arts. This non-profit group worked passionately to save the landmark from destruction. After a successful grass-roots campaign, the association purchased the theatre and re-opened it on May 22, 1983.

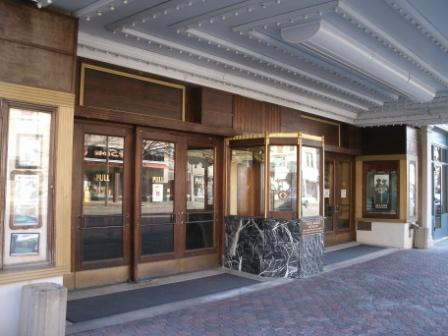
Ticket window

The theatre operates year-round with more than 80,000 patrons passing through its doors each year. Its dynamic art-in-education program has reached thousands of young people from throughout the region. It also features a community theatre program supported by more than 400 volunteers, from actors and carpenters to ushers. It has presented some of the world's finest performers, from the Vienna Boys Choir to Anne Murray, and from George Carlin to the Washington Ballet. The Warner's dedicated Board of Directors represents a cross-section of business, education, government, and the arts.

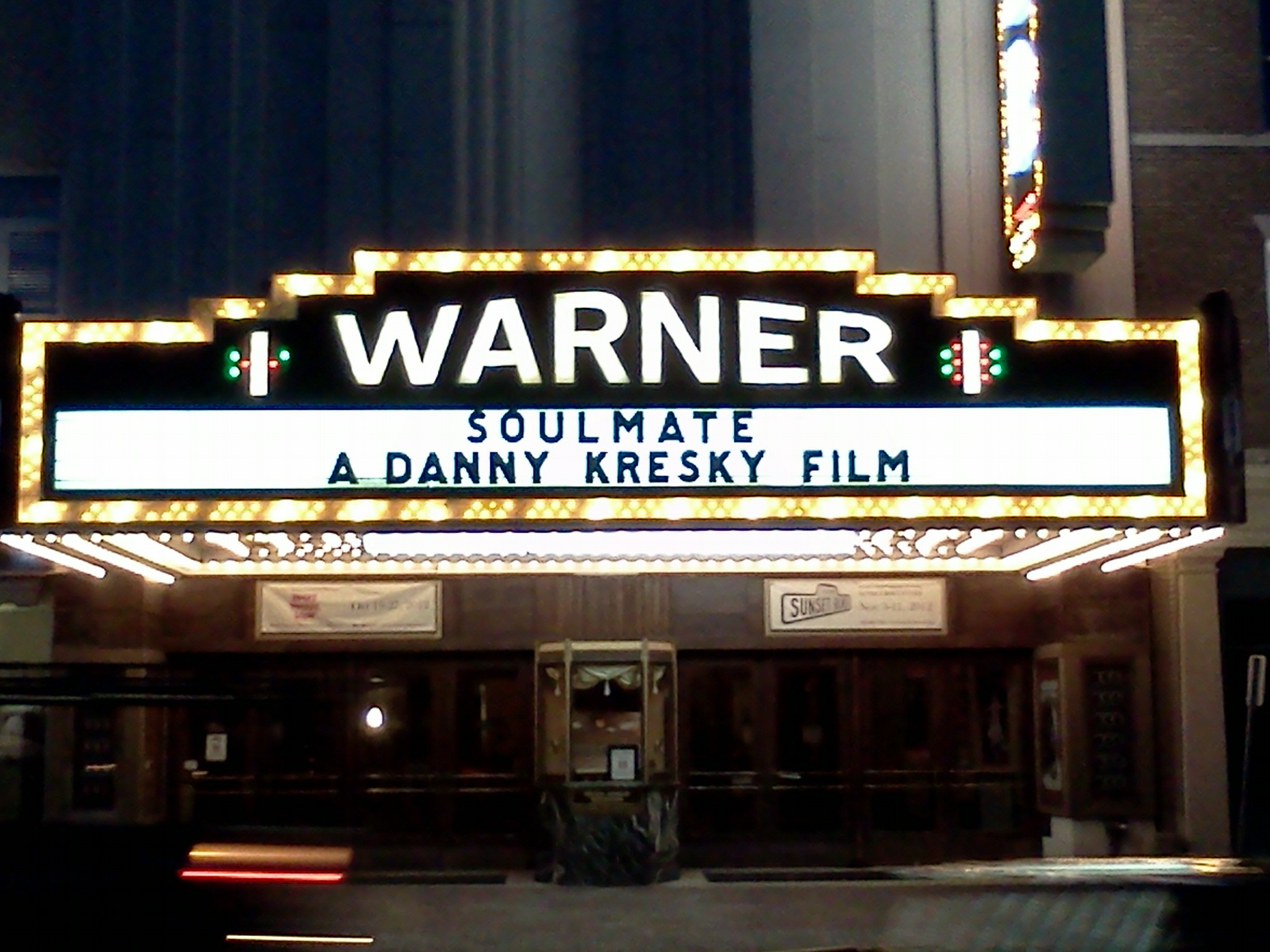
Warner Theater marquee set up for Paul Rothbart's independent short, "Isn't It Romantic?"

On October 14, 2012, independent film director Paul Rothbart shot the opening scene for his short romantic comedy, "Isn't It Romantic?" in the lobby of the Warner.

== Restoration ==
Funded by an exhaustive fund-raising effort, that included generous support from the State and Federal governments, the community, and regional corporations, the Warner Theatre closed its doors in early August 2002 to complete Phase One of its restoration of the vintage Art Deco auditorium. Construction crews cleared the venue of its 1956 seating, worn wall hangings, and interim floor covering. For the next two months, the auditorium was filled with 45 ft. high scaffolding to enable the restoration of the intricately stencilled ceiling, refurbishment of the huge, silver and gold star-shaped light, and cleaning and gilding for the complex, interweaving pattern that tops the theatre's walls.

The "monkey fur"—actually crushed velvet—wall covering that was brown for more than a generation, has been restored back to its original vivid blood orange hue through a supplier in Germany. Gold brocade draperies from France now accent the walls, replace the act curtain, and dress the lobby stairway landing. The auditorium floor was also refurbished to better accommodate handicap access, and the lobby, aisle, and atrium carpeting were all restored with a recreation of the original Art Deco pattern that lined the floors when the theatre opened in 1931. The lighting, sound, and fire alarm systems were also updated, restoring the venue back to state-of-the-art status.

== Damage ==
In 1999 a fire broke out in the theatre. A ghost light nicknamed "Larry The Light" was left too close to the act curtain by the theatre's cleaning crew. The light ignited the curtain, and the flames spread quickly. Damages amounting to $300,000 included the loss of the act curtain, damage to the stage floor, and smoke damage to the auditorium walls and ceiling.

== See also ==
- National Register of Historic Places listings in Litchfield County, Connecticut
