= Thurman v. City of Torrington =

1985 U.S. district court decision

Tracy Thurman v. City of Torrington
- Court: United States District Court for the District of Connecticut
- Full case name: Tracy Thurman v. City of Torrington, et al
- Decided: June 25 1985
- Citation: 595 F.Supp. 1521 (C.D.1 1984)

Holding
- Local police of the City of Torrington ignored domestic violence reports pertaining to the husband of Tracey Thurman and further failed to enforce a court ordered restraining order. The court further finds that the City of Torrington did not maintain a standard policy of legal discrimination against all women.

Court membership
- Judge sitting: Senior District Judge Blumenfeld

Laws applied
- Connecticut Family Violence Prevention and Response Act of 1986

Thurman v. City of Torrington, DC, 595 F.Supp. 1521 (1985) was a court decision concerning Tracey Thurman, a Connecticut homemaker who sued the city police department in Torrington, Connecticut, and claimed a failure of equal protection under the law against her abusive husband Charles "Buck" Thurman, Sr.

== Case ==
In 1982, Tracey Thurman left her husband, Charles "Buck" Thurman, after a brief but violent marriage. She took with her their only child, Charles Jr. For eight months, the couple lived apart while Buck harassed Tracey and verbally threatened to kill her.

In November 1982, Buck forcibly entered the home Tracey was staying at and removed Charles Jr.. Charles Jr. was returned to his mother, but the police failed to accept the complaint of criminal trespass from the homeowner.

Four days later, Buck stood in front of Tracey's car on a public street and verbally threatened her. Although there was a police officer nearby, he did not intervene until Buck broke the windshield of Tracey's car with his fist. Buck was convicted of breach of the peace and received a six-month suspended sentence with a two-year conditional discharge. He was ordered to stay away from Tracey, but within weeks, Buck resumed threatening Tracey. Tracey reported the behavior to police, but no effort was made to arrest Buck.

Between January and May 1983, Buck made numerous threats to Tracey, violating the court order. She reported these threats to police, but no action was taken. On five occasions in May 1983, Tracey appeared at the Torrington Police Station to request the arrest of her husband because of his repeated threats of violence. The police gave Tracey various excuses for their inaction including "the officer who has your case is on vacation."

On May 6, 1983, Tracey filed for and was granted a restraining order against Buck.

On June 10, 1983, Buck arrived at the house Tracey was staying at and demanded to see her. Tracey remained inside and contacted the police. Fifteen minutes later, with no officer in sight, Tracey exited the house to speak to Buck. It was 25 minutes after Tracey's call until a single officer arrived, who sat in his patrol car while Buck chased Tracey, grabbed her by the hair, and stabbed her 13 times.

The officer eventually exited the car and took the knife from Buck but made no effort to arrest him. While the officer watched, Buck kicked Tracey in the head several times, breaking her neck. Buck then ran into the house, grabbed Charles Jr. and took him outside. Buck dropped Charles Jr. on Tracey's limp body and once again kicked her in the head.

Roughly 40 minutes after the police arrived, Tracey was loaded into an ambulance. Only after Buck attempted to enter the ambulance and attack both paramedics and Tracey again was he finally arrested.

Buck was convicted of assault and sentenced to 20 years but served less than eight years in prison.

Tracey Thurman spent eight months in the hospital. She was partially and permanently paralyzed.

The case was brought by attorney Burton M. Weinstein, who is well known for his work involving police misconduct, and his associate Judith A. Mauzaka. When the lawsuit was filed in 1984, Tracey Thurman became the first woman in America to sue a town individually and its police department for violating her civil rights, claiming the police had ignored the violence because she was married to the perpetrator.

The case was allowed to proceed in a ruling by Senior Judge M. Joseph Blumenfeld, who had been appointed to the bench by President Kennedy in 1961. The claim survived a motion to dismiss, which asserted that it had not asserted a constitutionally-based claim of a violation of equal protection. The claim was that by practice and custom or by the custom over months of failing to address the complaints of a single victim of domestic violence, the plaintiff as a woman and victim of domestic violence was being afforded differential treatment than other victims of violence, which made a viable constitutional claim for damages. The motion to dismiss was denied, and the case was allowed to proceed.

The district court found that "a pattern of affording inadequate protection, or no protection at all, to women who have complained of being abused by their husbands... is tantamount to an administrative classification used to implement the law in a discriminatory fashion."

Tracey Thurman was awarded $2.3 million but eventually settled for $1.9 million when the city agreed to forgo an appeal.

== Legacy ==
The Thurman lawsuit brought about sweeping national reform of domestic violence laws, including the "Thurman Law" (aka the Family Violence Prevention and Response Act) instituted in Connecticut in 1986, which mandates police make arrests in domestic violence cases even if the victim does not wish to press charges.

The large financial penalty against the City of Torrington in the Thurman case was widely reported in the popular press and in academic journals. Police departments were forced by financial fear to change how they handled domestic violence.

Tracey Thurman's story was later made into a 1989 television movie, entitled A Cry for Help: The Tracey Thurman Story, starring Nancy McKeon as Tracey, Dale Midkiff as Buck, Bruce Weitz as Tracey's lawyer Burton Weinstein, and Philip Baker Hall as presiding Judge Blumenfeld.

== Similar cases ==
- Scott v. Hart
- Bruno v. Codd

== See also ==
- Intimate partner violence
- WhyIStayed/WhyILeft
