= A Cry for Help: The Tracey Thurman Story =

- Film poster
- Genre: Drama
- Written by: Beth Sullivan
- Directed by: Robert Markowitz
- Starring: Nancy McKeon; Dale Midkiff; Graham Jarvis; Yvette Heyden
- Theme music composer: Nicholas Pike
- Country of origin: United States
- Original language: English

Production
- Producer: Lee Miller
- Cinematography: Eric Noman Van Haren
- Editor: Harvey Rosenstock
- Running time: 96 minutes
- Production companies: Dick Clark Productions; U.T.L. Productions

Original release
- Network: NBC
- Release: October 2, 1989

A Cry for Help: The Tracey Thurman Story is a 1989 American made-for-television drama film based on the 1985 ruling Thurman v. City of Torrington. The film stars Nancy McKeon as Tracey; Dale Midkiff as Buck; and Bruce Weitz as Tracey's lawyer, Burton Weinstein.

== Plot ==
The movie opens with Tracey Thurman being rushed to the hospital after being attacked and nearly killed by her estranged husband, Buck.

An extended flashback shows how Tracey and Buck met and the events leading up the attack:

Tracey works in a hotel in Florida and meets Buck and his fellow construction workers. Buck is initially charming, but over time, he displays violent tempers, even taking them all out on Tracey, telling her all about how his mother abused him as a child. Despite the violent outbursts, she agrees not to leave him. When she tells him that she is pregnant with his child, he punches her in the face and kicks her in the stomach. She then returns to Torrington, Connecticut, and stays with her friends, Judy and Rick. Buck finds her and apologizes for his behavior. He asks her to marry him and promises to settle down in Connecticut. Tracey is hesitant but agrees when Buck promises never to hit her again. After they marry, she gives birth their son, C.J.

Buck has no luck finding a job, and the family has no choice but to return to Florida. Over the next year, Buck gambles away all of their money and continues to physically abuse her, even in front of C.J. Tracey leaves him and returns to Torrington.

Buck follows Tracey to Torrington and hopes to surprise her, while welcoming himself into the home she is staying in, and tells her he has found a job at a diner. Tracey refuses to get back together with him and tells him to leave. He takes C.J. and runs outside. Tracey calls the police, and they find Buck feeding his son at work and have him clock out to take him into custody. The police say that she can have her son back if she and Buck reunite. Tracey decides to divorce Buck and is awarded custody of her son without Buck seeing him for the time being. As she leaves, Buck attacks her in her own car. Buck is arrested, and Tracey is granted a restraining order against him, but he continues to harass and threaten to kill her. Tracey repeatedly goes to the police, but they refuse to help her since they have not witnessed Buck’s threats or acts of violence.

After the divorce is finalized, he shows up again, and Tracey calls the police in hopes that they will see him threatening her and arrest him. Tracey hides in the house and waits for the police but, after some time, eventually comes out after Buck threatens to break in. He demands Tracey to stop the divorce, but she refuses. When the police officer finally arrives, Buck pulls out a knife and stabs her numerous times and cuts her face and throat. He goes into the house and grabs C.J., as Tracey lies in a pool of blood. Buck continuously kicks and stomps on Tracey’s body, but the police officer does not intervene. More officers arrive, along with an ambulance, and Buck is eventually arrested, while Tracey is taken to the hospital.

In the hospital, Tracey's lawyer, Burton Weinstein, together with Tracey's sister, discuss filing a civil lawsuit against the Torrington police department for failing to protect her. Tracey suffers debilitating injuries from the attack and spends several months learning to walk again. Buck is sentenced to 20 years in prison with the possibility of parole in 1991. Tracey is apprehensive about the possibility of his parole, knowing that upon his release, he would be coming after her. However, Weinstein is able to keep Tracey focused on the lawsuit. Following the civil suit trial, the jury rules in favor of Tracey, finding that her rights were violated, and she is awarded $2,300,000. She is also granted a permanent restraining order against Buck, and he will not be allowed to contact C.J. or Tracey for the rest of their lives. Happy with the decision, she hugs Weinstein. In real life, Tracey was remarried to Michael Motuzick and gets divorced from Buck. Michael was granted permission to adopt C.J. so the family could build their lives together.

== Cast ==
- Nancy McKeon as Tracey Thurman
- Dale Midkiff as Charles "Buck" Thurman
- Graham Jarvis as Officer Danziger
- Yvette Heyden as Judy Bentley
- Terri Hanauer as Cheryl
- Philip Baker Hall as Judge Blumenfeld
- David Wohl as Nagel
- David Ciminello as Rick Bentley
- Priscilla Pointer as Tracey's Mother
- Seth Isler as Lewis
- Burton Collins
- Bruce Weitz as Burton Weinstein
- David Wells as Minister
- Lee Ryan as Officer Avery
- Don Stark as Officer Driscoll
- Hank Woessner as Joe
- Todd Bryant as Card
- John Hertzler as Doctor
- Paul Comi as Officer Dempsey
- Joe George as Captain Kyker
- Redman Gleeson as Officer Bray
- Alan Haufrecht as Officer Cooper
- William Long Jr. as Sergeant Cherney
- Madison Mason as Officer Jones
- Raymond O'Keefe as Sergeant Smith
- Al Pugliese as Sergeant Kangas
- Charles Richards as Officer Davis
- David Hooks as Judge #1
- Richard Balin as Judge #2
