= Torrington Fire Department Headquarters =

- U.S. National Register of Historic Places
- U.S. Historic district – Contributing property
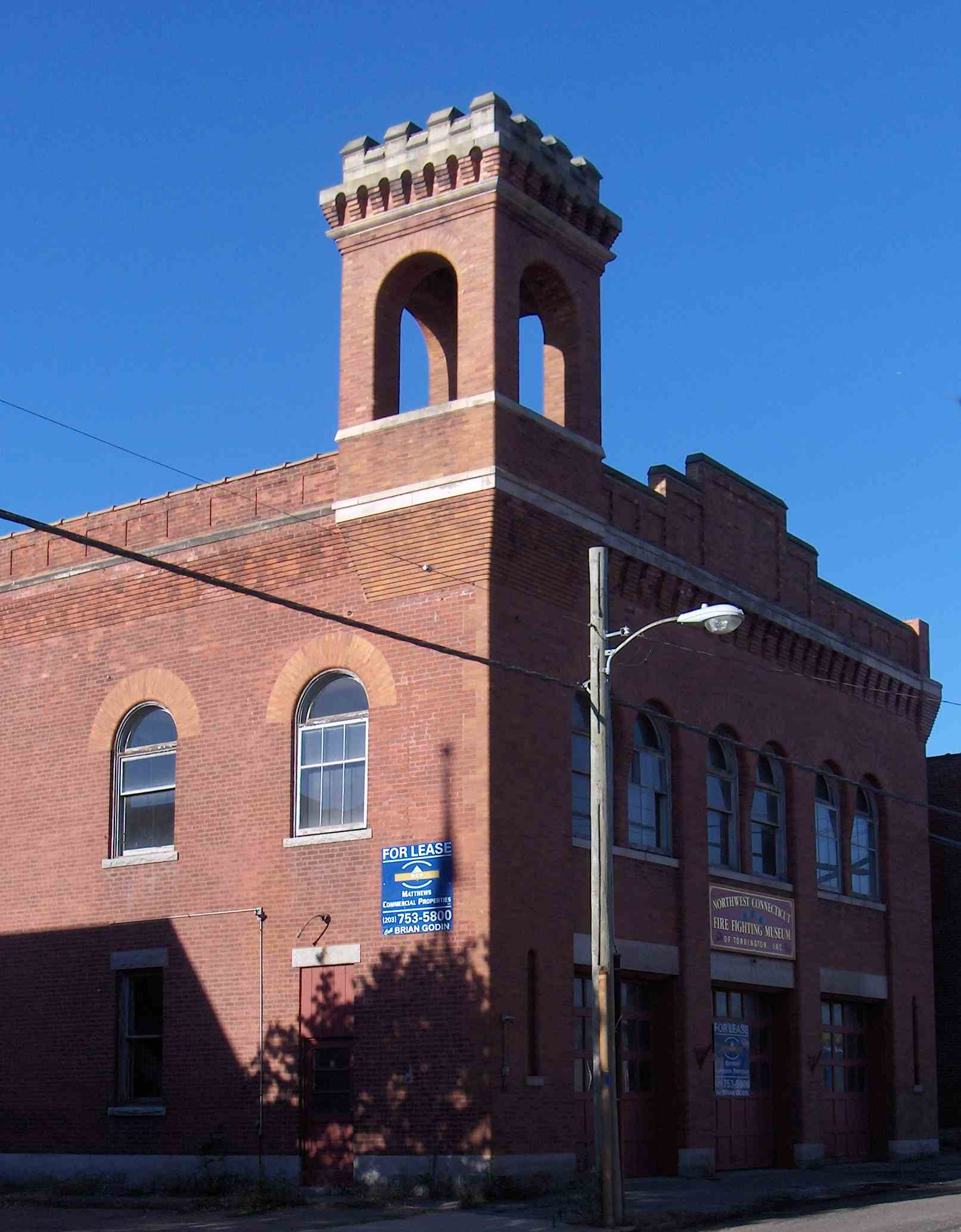

- Location within Connecticut Location within the United States
- Location: 117 Water Street, Torrington, Connecticut
- Coordinates: 41°48′6″N 73°7′29″W
- Area: 0.3 acres (0.12 ha)
- Built: 1901
- Built by: Hotchkiss Bros. Co.
- Architect: Charles Scranton Palmer
- Architectural style: Romanesque
- Part of: Water Street Historic District (ID02001698)
- NRHP reference No.: 87002185

Significant dates
- Added to NRHP: December 31, 1987
- Designated CP: January 15, 2003

The former Torrington Fire Department Headquarters is a historic building located at 117 Water Street in Torrington, Connecticut. It is located immediately adjacent to the modern headquarters at number 111. Completed in 1901, it is an elegant example of Romanesque Revival architecture, and served as the city's main firehouse until 1980. The building was listed on the National Register of Historic Places on December 31, 1987.

== Description and history ==
The former Torrington Fire Department Headquarters building is located on the west side of downtown Torrington, on the south side of Water Street near its junction with John Street. It is a two-story brick Romanesque Revival structure, two stories in height. The main facade is three bays wide, with rectangular equipment bay openings on the ground floor, and paired round-arch windows on the second. A belltower rises at the left corner, with an open round-arched belfry topped by a corbelled and crenellated roof. On the interior, the ground floor held equipment on heavy fir flooring, with firefighter accommodations, offices, and social space on the second floor. The basement has racks for drying hoses.

The station was designed by Charles Scranton Palmer and built in 1900-01. In addition to being an elegant example of its style, the building featured some the latest technological advances of the time, including electricity, and an automated system for releasing the horses that drew the pumps from their stalls. The building served as the main firehouse in the center of the town until 1980, when the adjacent modern premises were built.

== See also ==
- National Register of Historic Places listings in Litchfield County, Connecticut
