= Burr Pond State Park =

State park in Litchfield County, Connecticut

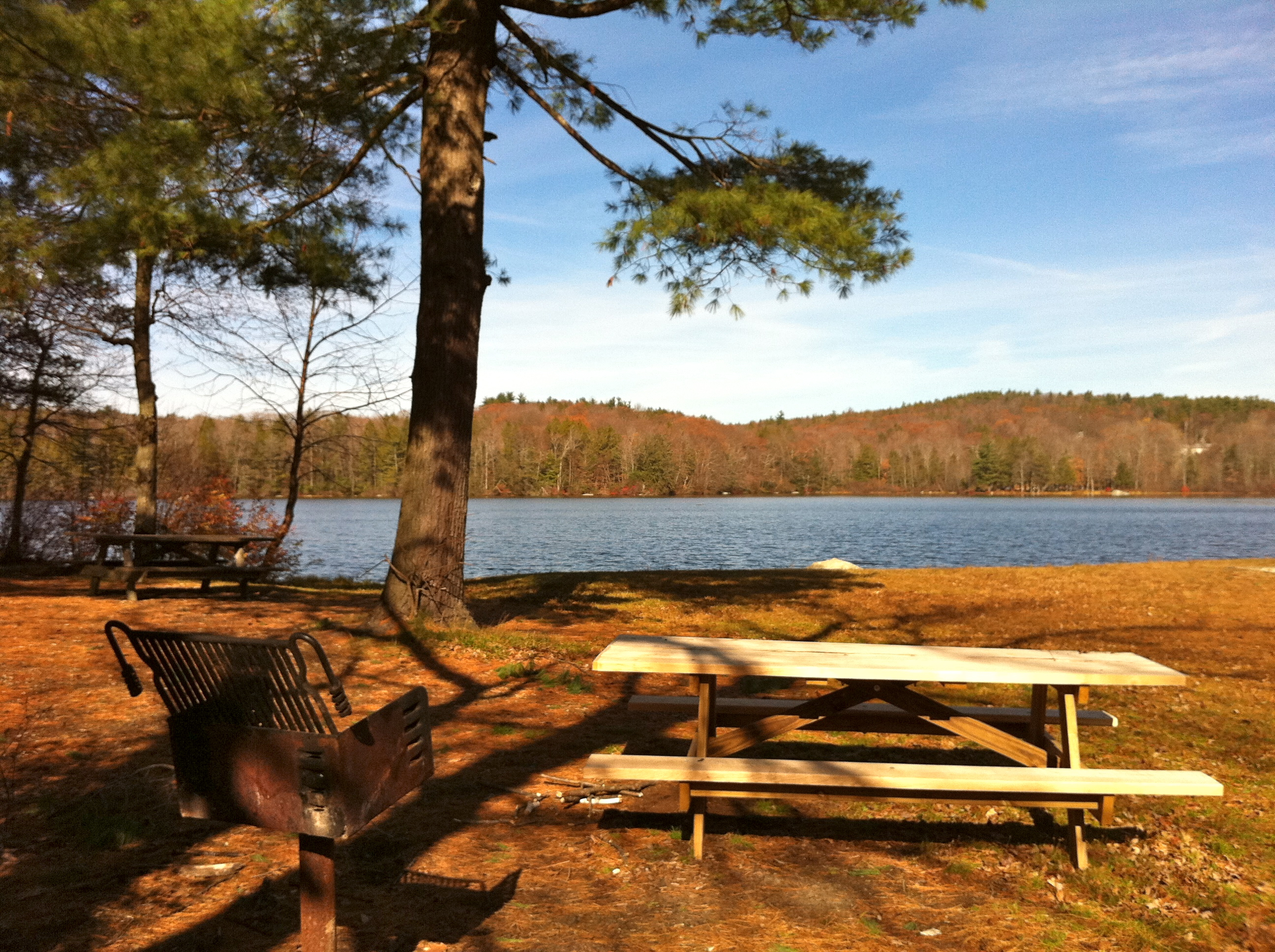

- Location within Connecticut Location within the United States
- Interactive map of Burr Pond State Park
- Location: Torrington, Connecticut, United States
- Coordinates: 41°52′10″N 73°05′50″W
- Area: 438 acres (177 ha)
- Elevation: 988 ft (301 m)
- Established: 1949
- Administrator: Connecticut Department of Energy and Environmental Protection
- Designation: Connecticut state park
- Website: Official website

Interactive map of Burr Pond State Park

Burr Pond State Park is a public recreation area covering 438 acres (177 ha) adjacent to Paugnut State Forest in the town of Torrington, Connecticut. The state park surrounds Burr Pond, an 85-acre (34 ha), man-made body of water with facilities for swimming, boating, and fishing. It is managed by the Connecticut Department of Energy and Environmental Protection.

== History ==
Burr Pond was created in 1851 when Milo Burr dammed several streams to create a source for power generation. The waterpower was used to operate a tannery and three sawmills. One of Burr's industrial buildings was used from 1857 to 1861 by Gail Borden as his first commercially successful condensed milk factory. The building burned down in 1877; the remains of its stone foundations can be seen off Burr Mountain Road.

Burr Pond and the area around it were once part of Paugnut State Forest. The acreage was transferred to the State Parks Division and became a state park in 1949.

== Activities and amenities ==
Burr Pond has several small inlets and islands, a rocky shore, and deep drop-offs in several places. Its maximum depth is only 13 feet (4.0 m). Fish species present include largemouth bass, chain pickerel, black crappie, yellow perch, bluegill, pumpkinseed, and brown bullhead.

The blue-blazed Walcott Trail 2.5-mile-long (4.0 km) loop goes around the pond. The 2-mile-long (3.2 km) John Muir Trail across Paugnut State Forest connects the park with Sunnybrook State Park.

A swimming beach, picnic areas, concession stand, and boat rentals are offered seasonally. A trailered boat launch is located at the pond's north end.
