= Fyler–Hotchkiss Estate =

Historic house in Connecticut, United States

- U.S. National Register of Historic Places
- U.S. Historic district – Contributing property
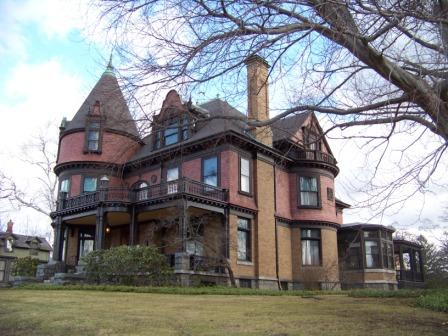

- Location within Connecticut Location within the United States
- Location: 192 Main Street, Torrington, Connecticut
- Coordinates: 41°48′15″N 73°7′19″W
- Area: 1.6 acres (0.65 ha)
- Built: 1898
- Built by: Hotchkiss Bros. Building Co.
- Architect: Allen, William H.
- Architectural style: Late Victorian, Italianate, Chateauesque
- Part of: Downtown Torrington Historic District (ID88002978)
- NRHP reference No.: 87000129

Significant dates
- Added to NRHP: February 12, 1987
- Designated CP: December 22, 1988

The Fyler–Hotchkiss Estate, also known as the Hotchkiss-Fyler House Museum, is a historic house museum at 192 Main Street in Torrington, Connecticut. Operated by the Torrington Historical Society, its main house is a well-preserved and distinctive example of Chateauesque Victorian architecture. It is also significant for its association with Orsamus Fyler, a prominent local politician and businessman, who was chairman of the state Republican Party. The property was listed on the National Register of Historic Places in 2009.

== Description and history ==
The Fyler–Hotchkiss Estate is located north of Torrington's central business district, on the east side of Main Street north of city hall and the Catholic church. The estate complex includes two houses and a carriage house, set back from the street. The main house is a large 2 1/2-story brick structure, with a cruciform plan. It has a hipped roof with gabled sections projecting to the sides, and dormers on the front and rear roof faces. A porte-cochere projects from the left side, and a circular three-story turret with conical roof projects from the left front corner. The front-facing gable dormer has a sculpted outline that is repeated at a much smaller scale in dormers rising in front of the turret roof. The main house, the Fyler–Hotchkiss house, is Chateauesque in style.

The house was built in 1897 to a design by William H. Allen for Orsamus Fyler. Fyler was a prominent local businessman and politician, who served in the American Civil War and was active in Republican Party politics. As state insurance commissioner he oversaw important reforms to the state's insurance regulations. The house passed to Gertrude Fyler Hotchkiss and Edward Hotchkiss, who was also prominent in local politics and business. The adjacent Italianate house, part of the original purchase by Orsamus Fyler, was used by the family as a rental property.

== Gallery ==
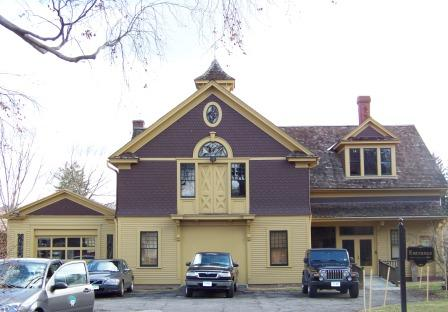
Carriage house

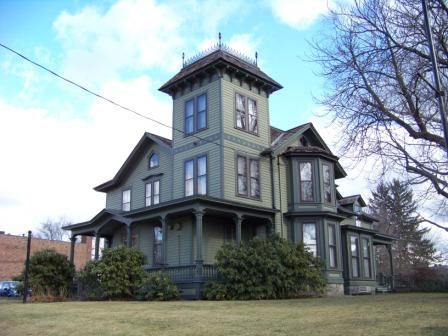
Carson House

== See also ==
- National Register of Historic Places listings in Litchfield County, Connecticut
