= Torringford Street Historic District =

Historic district in Connecticut, United States

- U.S. National Register of Historic Places
- U.S. Historic district
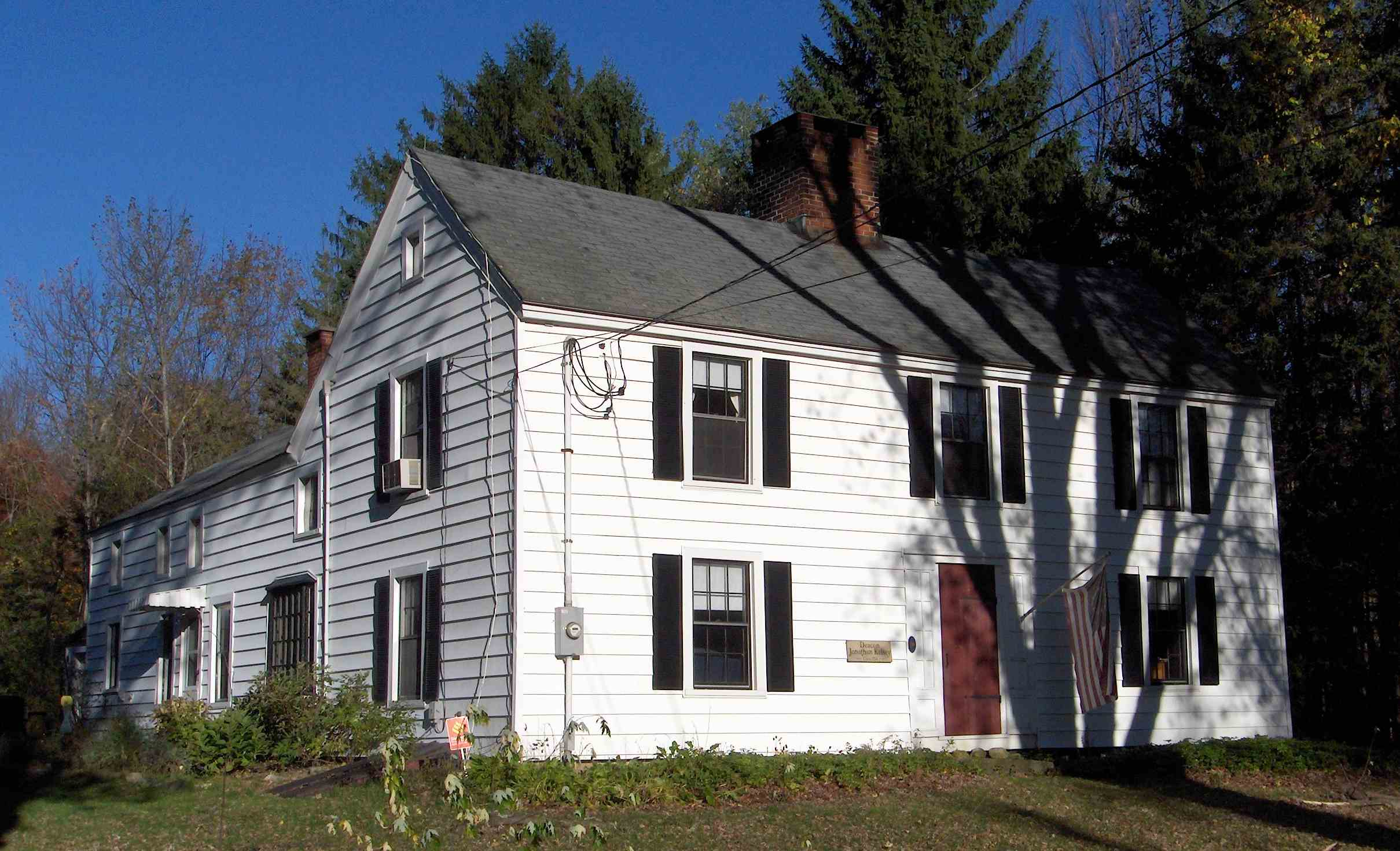

- Location within Connecticut Location within the United States
- Location: Torringford Street from Main Street North to West Hill Road, Torrington, Connecticut
- Coordinates: 41°50′45″N 73°4′27″W
- Area: 650 acres (260 ha)
- Built: 1732
- Architectural style: Colonial Revival, Colonial, Federal
- NRHP reference No.: 91000991
- Added to NRHP: July 31, 1991

The Torringford Street Historic District is a historic district on the eastern side of the city of Torrington, Connecticut, United States. The district includes properties along Torringford Street (Route 183), the main thoroughfare of the Torringford section of the city, between U.S. Route 202 and West Hill Road. The road is one of the oldest in Torrington, and this section is notable for containing a cross-section of well-preserved architecture from the 18th to the mid-20th centuries. The district was listed on the National Register of Historic Places in 1991.

== Description and history ==
The land that makes up the city of Torrington was settled in the 1730s and incorporated as a town in 1740. Its bounds were determined by the colonial legislature in 1732, at which time the route of Torringford Street was also laid out. The area's economy was based on agriculture, and it gained a separate identity from the town center due to geographic separation. A separate church was approved for the Torringford district in 1763 and built in 1768; it has not survived, but its location near West Pearl Street is marked. The area flourished with modest commerce in the mid-19th century, but became economically flat when focus of economic development moved to the town center with the arrival of the railroad in 1849. The area has remained largely agricultural since then, with some residential subdivision taking place.

The historic district covers some 650 acres (260 ha), extending along Torringford Street from US 202 to West Hill Road. All of the district's buildings face Torringford Street, except one property on Hayden Hill Road, which contributes to the visual landscape. The modern road's roughly straight alignment is essentially what was laid out in 1732. The district includes 119 historically significant buildings, most of the modest wood frame residential structures. Notable early buildings include the c. 1757 Shubael Griswold Tavern, which was one of the first taverns in the community.

== See also ==
- National Register of Historic Places listings in Litchfield County, Connecticut
