= Downtown Torrington Historic District =

Historic district in Connecticut, United States

- U.S. National Register of Historic Places
- U.S. Historic district
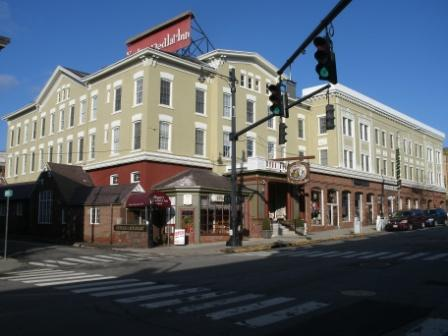
- Yankee Pedlar

- Location within Connecticut Location within the United States
- Location: Roughly bounded by Church and Alvord Streets, Center Cemetery, Willow Street, East Main Street, Litchfield Street, and Prospect Street, Torrington, Connecticut
- Coordinates: 41°48′7″N 73°7′17″W
- Area: 56 acres (23 ha)
- Architect: Hunt, William E.; Et al.
- Architectural style: Late 19th And 20th Century Revivals, Late Victorian, Modern Movement
- NRHP reference No.: 88002978
- Added to NRHP: December 22, 1988

The Downtown Torrington Historic District encompasses the historic central downtown area of Torrington, Connecticut. Centered on a crossing of the Naugatuck River, the 56-acre (23 ha) historic district is well-represented with architecture from the mid-19th to early 20th centuries. It was listed on the National Register of Historic Places in 1988.

== Description and history ==
The area that is now downtown Torrington developed in the 18th century, as a major junction point of the north-south Waterbury Turnpike, connecting Waterbury in the south to Winchester in the north, with the Canton Turnpike, running east to Canton. These streets, now Main Street, South Main Street, and East Main Street, are still the major roads in the area. A mill was established on the Naugatuck River in 1813, and the area experienced more rapid growth after the railroad arrived in 1849. By 1880 the Central Square area was clearly established as the heart of the downtown area. The area declined economically in the 1920s, and the downtown area south of the river was subjected to urban renewal activities later in the 20th century.

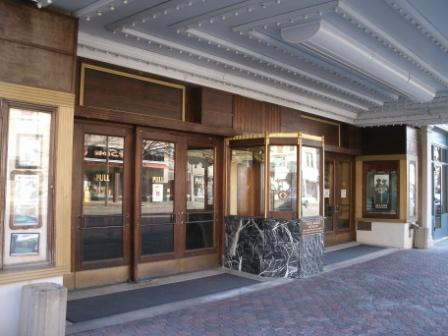
Warner Theatre

The historic district is a roughly triangular area centered on the junction of Main Street and East Main Street just north of the Naugatuck River. It extends northward along those roads, to Alvord and Willow Streets, and extends south, across the river, to include Coe Memorial Park and a few adjacent buildings. It covers 56 acres (23 ha), with 71 historically significant buildings. It includes what was originally the Conley Hotel in 1891, now the Yankee Pedlar, as well as the Warner Theatre and the Fyler-Hotchkiss Estate, the latter two of which are individually listed on the National Register. A walking tour of the district designed by the Torrington Historical Society visits 21 properties.

== See also ==
- National Register of Historic Places listings in Litchfield County, Connecticut
