= Torrington, Connecticut =

City in Connecticut, United States

Torrington
- City
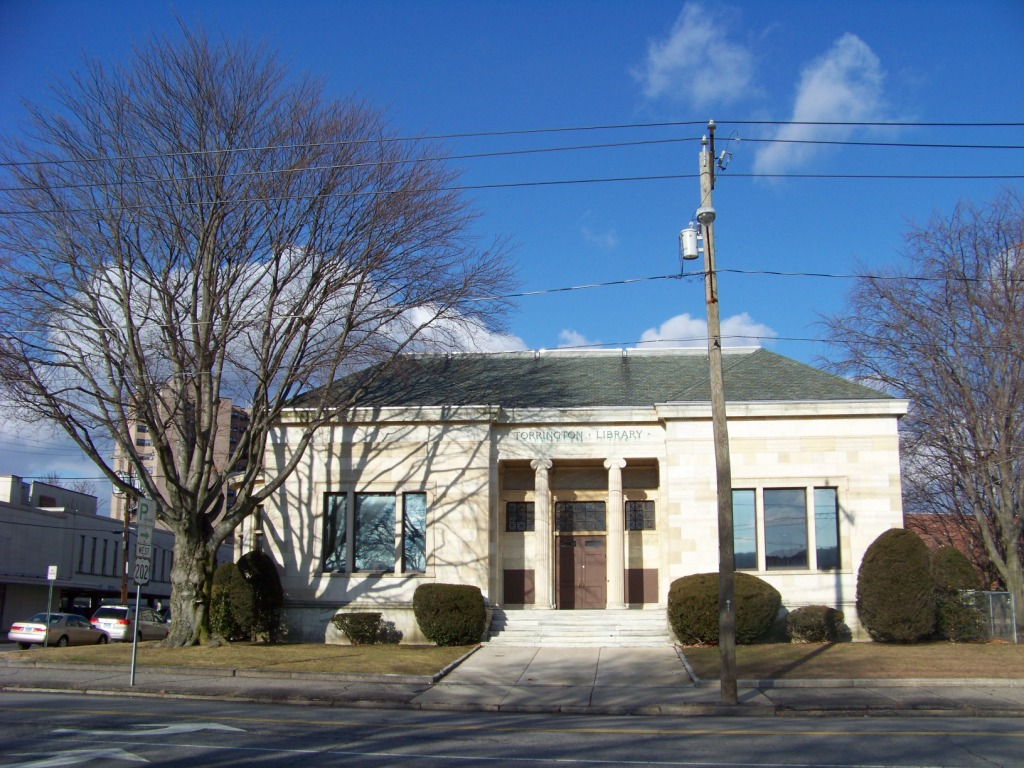
- Torrington Public Library

- Seal Logo
- Nickname: T-Town
- Coordinates: 41°48′23″N 73°07′50″W
- Country: United States
- U.S. state: Connecticut
- County: Litchfield
- Region: Northwest Hills
- Incorporated (town): 1740
- Incorporated (city): 1923

Government
  - Type: Mayor-council
  - Mayor: Molly Spino (R)
  - City Council: Chris Beyus; Paul E. Cavagnero; Rachel Hannon Harrel; Armand Maniccia; David Oliver; Anne L. Ruwet

Area
  - Total: 40.33 sq mi (104.46 km^{2})
  - Land: 39.77 sq mi (103.01 km^{2})
  - Water: 0.56 sq mi (1.44 km^{2})
- Elevation: 541 ft (165 m)

Population (2020)
  - Total: 35,515
  - Density: 893/sq mi (344.8/km^{2})
- Time zone: UTC−5 (EST)
  - Summer (DST): UTC−4 (EDT)
- ZIP code: 06790
- Area codes: 860/959
- FIPS code: 09-76500
- GNIS feature ID: 0211514
- Website: www.torringtonct.gov

Torrington is the most populated municipality and largest city in Litchfield County, Connecticut, and the Northwest Hills Planning Region. It is also the core city of Greater Torrington, one of the largest micropolitan areas in the United States. The city population was 35,515 according to the 2020 census. The city is located roughly 23 miles (37 km) west of Hartford, 34 miles (55 km) southwest of Springfield, Massachusetts, 67 miles (108 km) southeast of Albany, New York, 84 miles (135 km) northeast of New York City, and 127 miles (204 km) west of Boston, Massachusetts.

Torrington is a former mill town, as are most other towns along the Naugatuck River Valley. Downtown Torrington is home to the Nutmeg Conservatory for the Arts, which trains ballet dancers and whose Company performs in the Warner Theatre, a 1,700-seat auditorium built in 1931 as a cinema by the Warner Brothers film studio. Downtown Torrington hosts the largest Lodge of Elks in New England. Downtown Torrington also hosts KidsPlay, a children's museum which was founded in 2012 and expanded their location in 2015 after purchasing the adjacent building.

Torrington has two radio stations, WAPJ 89.9 FM, operated by the non-profit Torrington Community Radio Foundation, and WSNG 610 AM, owned by Red Wolf Broadcasting.

Torrington has two daily newspapers. The Republican-American, which circulates a Litchfield County edition and has a bureau on Franklin Street, and The Register Citizen, which serves Torrington and Winsted, in addition to most of the Northwest Corner. Charlotte Hungerford Hospital has also developed into an important health care resource for the area. In 2008, Torrington was named by Bizjournals as the number one "Dreamtown" (micropolitan statistical area) out of ten in the United States to live in.

== History ==
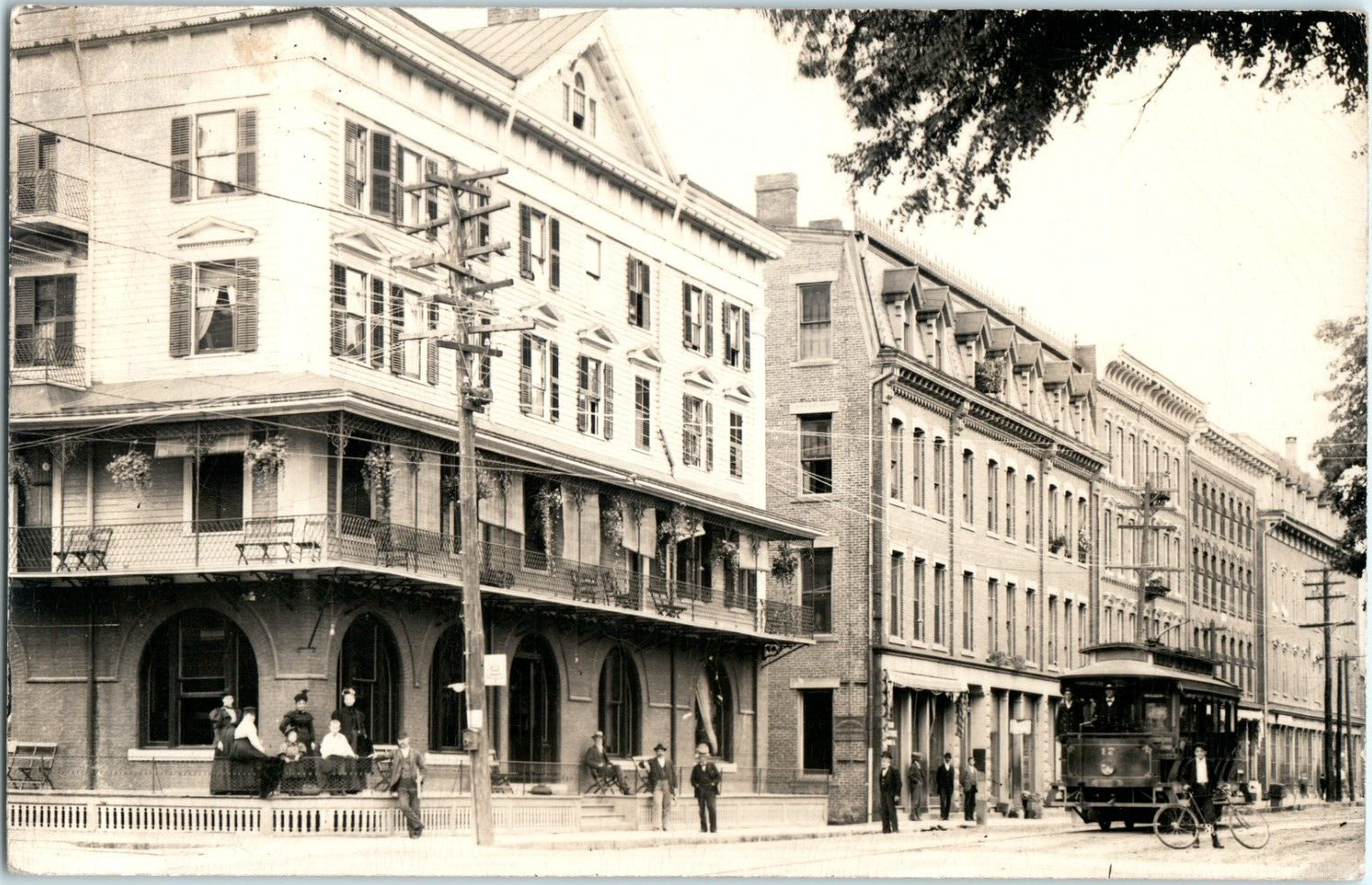
Vintage postcard of the Beardsley Hotel with streetcar

Torrington was first settled in 1735 by Ebenezer Lyman, Jr., of Durham, Connecticut. The downtown section of Torrington was known as Wolcottville, after the Wolcott family of Connecticut, which produced several governors between 1813 and 1881. Its early settlers resided on the hills west of the Naugatuck River where the first school, church, store, and tavern were constructed. Later, the eastern hill known as Torringford was settled, as it provided the best farmland. Torrington was given permission to organize a government and incorporate as a town in October 1740. The town is named after Torrington in Devon, England.

The fast moving waters of the Naugatuck River were used to power early nineteenth-century industries. Industrial growth skyrocketed when Frederick Wolcott constructed a woolen mill in 1813. The mill attracted a large workforce and created demands for goods, services, and housing.

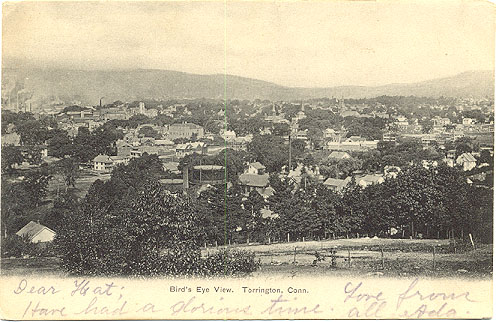
From a postcard sent in 1906

Israel Coe and Erastus Hodges began the construction of two brass mills on the Naugatuck River in 1834. This event sparked the beginning of the brass industry in Torrington, which later would spread throughout the entire Naugatuck Valley. In 1849, the Naugatuck Valley railroad was completed, connecting Torrington with other population centers, ending its isolation, and stimulating further industrial growth. Soon, Torrington was producing a variety of metal products, including needles, brass, hardware, bicycles, and tacks. Torrington's growing industrial plants attracted English, Irish, and German immigrants throughout the nineteenth and early twentieth centuries. Between 1880 and 1920, Torrington's population soared from 3,000 to 22,000 as immigration from southern and eastern Europe increased; most immigrants during this period were Poles, Czechs, Slovaks, and Italians. Torrington was chartered as a city in 1923.

In 1955, a massive flood destroyed much of the downtown area and other property in the region when Hurricanes Connie and Diane caused local rivers to overflow. Torrington is home to several state parks, one of which is the very popular Burr Pond State Park. In 1851, Milo Burr placed a dam across the confluence of several mountain streams impounding water for power. The tannery and three active sawmills erected downstream consumed the finest pines and oaks for miles around to meet the needs of lumber production. The clearings became homesites, and Connecticut's industrial leadership was further strengthened. Burr Pond was designated as a state park in 1949. The pond itself has several small inlets and islands. The shore is rocky and there are deep drop-offs in several places, but the pond only has a maximum depth of thirteen feet. Fish species present include largemouth bass, chain pickerel, black crappie, yellow perch, bluegill, pumpkinseed, and brown bullhead. Gail Borden, discoverer of the process of milk preservation by evaporation and condensation, built the world's first condensed milk factory here, in 1856. The new milk product proved to be of great value, particularly to the Union Army during the Civil War. Fire destroyed the mill in 1877. A bronze tablet marks its site, just below the falls.

Torrington is the birthplace of abolitionist John Brown. The birthplace accidentally burned in 1918. In the year 2000, the Torrington Historical Society acquired the property in merger with the John Brown Association. Plans are now being formulated to improve visitor services and to construct interpretive trails on the property.

There was a 100-acre University of Connecticut regional campus in Torrington. It closed in May 2016 due to low enrollment. In 2018, the site was sold to Five Points Arts Gallery for $375,000.

=== Downtown redevelopment ===
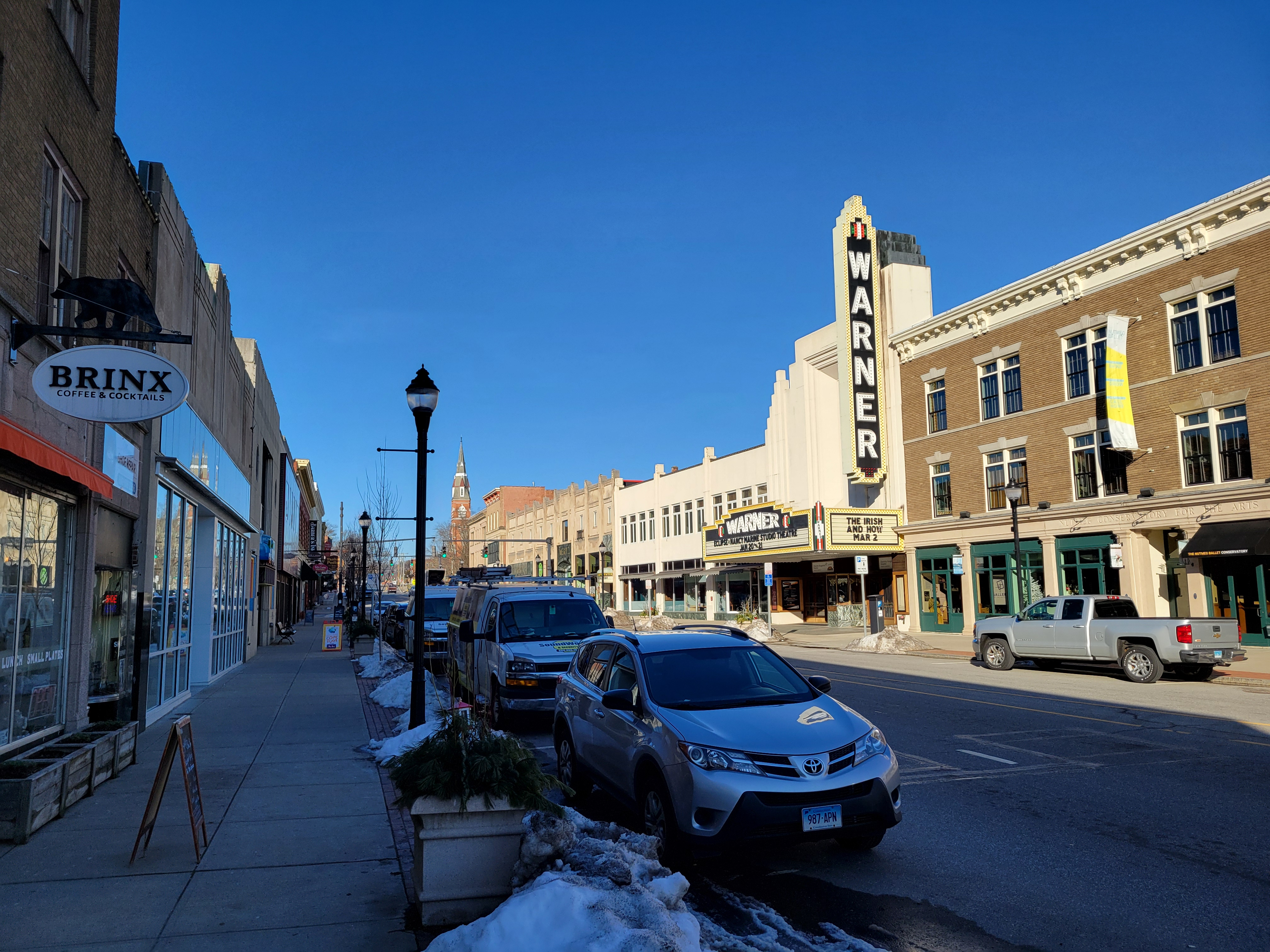
Main Street in Downtown Torrington

Torrington is planning to revitalize its downtown area in an effort to attract residents and visitors to the city's shopping and cultural opportunities. These redevelopment plans are still in discussion and are not yet completed. The City of Torrington will receive $500,000 for improvements and streetscape enhancements to Torrington's Main Street and downtown. The grant, which will flow through the state, will be designated for downtown improvements on the east side of Main Street and will include, among other enhancements, new sidewalks. A $750,000 grant for downtown improvements secured earlier in 2012 for the west side of Main Street will make similar improvements.

The following ideas have been discussed:

==== Coe Memorial Park restoration ====
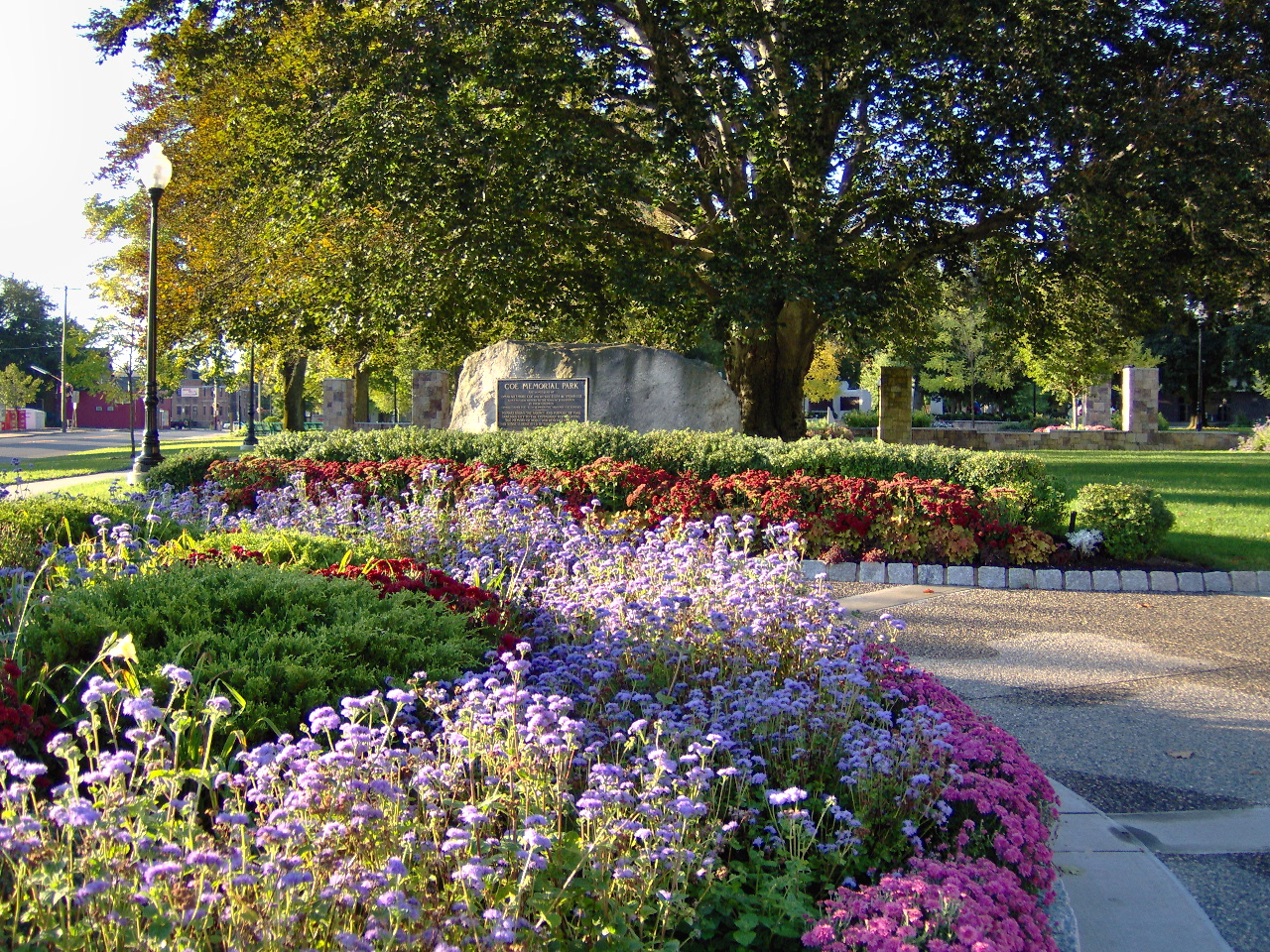
Coe Memorial Park (October 2007)

The historic restoration and renovation to downtown Coe Memorial Park were completed in the beginning of 2004. The Coe Memorial Park Subcommittee and the City of Torrington, worked closely with Ferrero Hixon Associates, to restore the Park to a Victorian walking park, much as it was when it was first gifted to the Town in 1906. These renovations included new sidewalks and paths, and the relocation of memorials and monuments. In 2005, award-winning horticulturist, Gwenythe B. Harvey, owner of the firm The Garden Goddess, LLC, was hired to redefine, design and upgrade existing garden areas. Coe Memorial Park's Botanical Gardens has since become a well-known tourist destination.

==== Retail expansion ====
Torrington hopes to attract a wide variety of merchants into its downtown setting. Empty and abandoned buildings would be converted into a mix of retail, office, and residential space. A potential plan discusses the possibility of a national clothing retailer or bookstore chain constructing a location at the top of Water Street on the site of the Kelley Bus Company. This plan had come under fire by some because it involves the demolition of the former Torrington railroad station, which is considered by many to be historical. Despite this, the 113-year-old former Torrington railroad station was demolished, as a safety hazard, on January 4, 2011. The historical society was able to save a few pieces, including the ticket window and some of the terra-cotta ornaments from the outside of the building.

==== Accessibility ====
A parking garage is slated to be constructed in the heart of downtown on either Main Street or Water Street. The municipal parking lot next to the Torrington Library would also serve as a downtown parking area. Because the downtown redevelopment project emphasizes pedestrian access, brick sidewalks lined with trees, benches, and bike racks would be constructed along Main Street.

==== Roads and traffic ====
To relieve congestion, the city plans to convert the Main Street/Water Street/East Main Street downtown intersection into a "+" shape, rather than its current criticized setup. The city expects to convert Main Street into a one-way road with parking lining one side of the street. The neighboring Prospect Street would also be converted into a one-way road with traffic flowing in the opposite direction. Most of the roads are in medium to poor condition and filled with pot holes.

== Geography ==
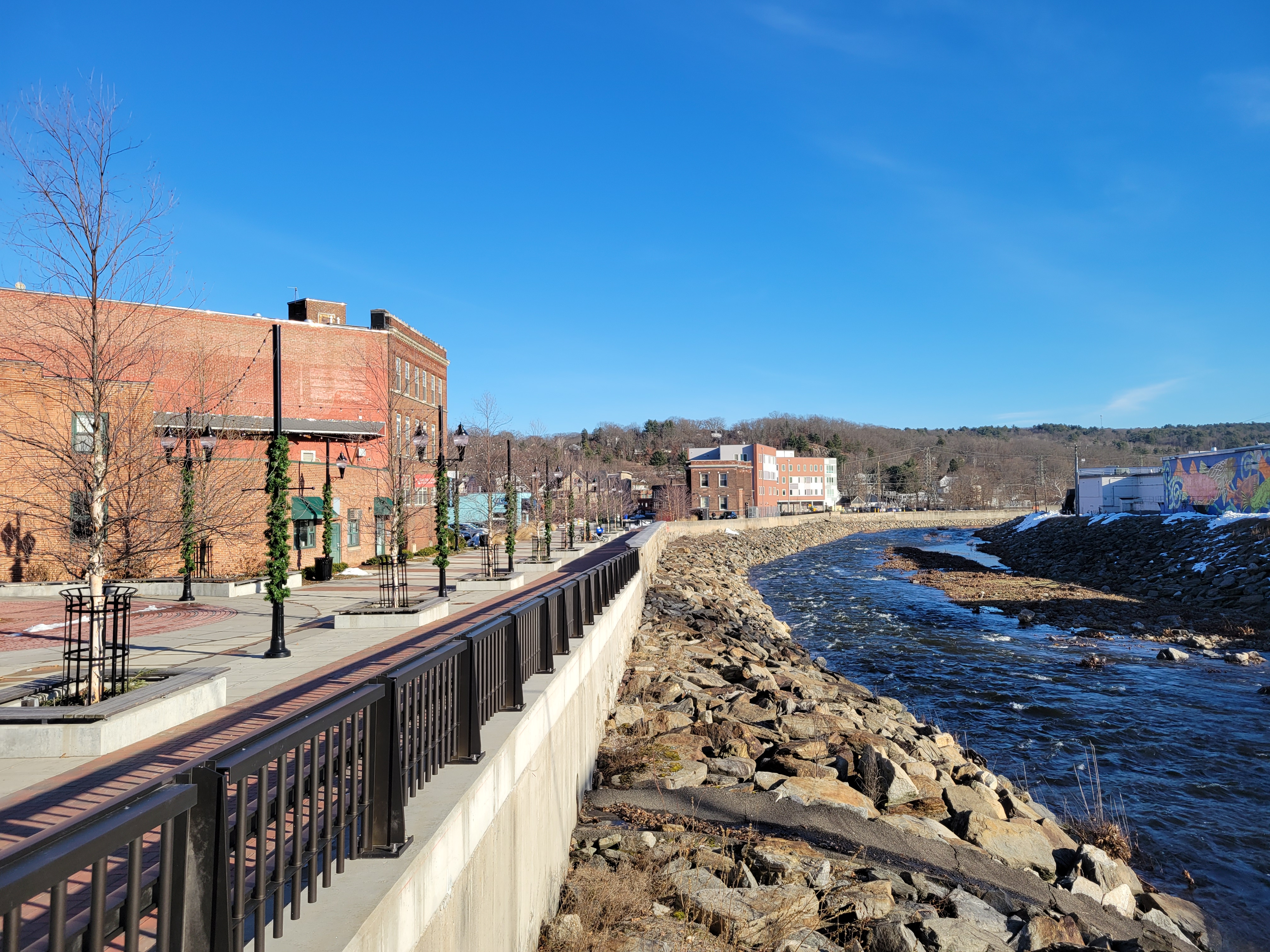
View of the Naugatuck River

According to the United States Census Bureau, the city has a total area of 40.4 square miles (104.6 km^{2}). Approximately 39.8 square miles (103.1 km^{2}) of this area is land and 1.5 km^{2} (0.6 sq mi or 1.41%) is water.

The eastern and western sides of the city, at its borders, are at the tops of peaks, while the downtown and central sections of the city are in the Naugatuck River Valley. This provides some interesting views from the higher locations, with the city lights as a backdrop below. Due to the lack of suitable highways and bypass routes in an east–west direction, crossing the city requires driving down into the valley and back up the other side.

=== Principal communities ===
- Burrville
- Drakeville
- Newfield
- Torringford (part of which has been named the Torringford Street Historic District)
- Downtown Torrington
- West Torrington
- Wrightville

=== Climate ===
This climatic region is typified by large seasonal temperature differences, with warm to hot (and often humid) summers and cold (sometimes severely cold) winters. According to the Köppen Climate Classification system, Torrington has a humid continental climate, abbreviated "Dfb" on climate maps.

The climate data is taken from a weather station in Bakerville, CT 5 miles east of Torrington.

Climate data for Bakersville, CT
Month	Jan	Feb	Mar	Apr	May	Jun	Jul	Aug	Sep	Oct	Nov	Dec	Year
Record high °F (°C)	69 (21)	76 (24)	90 (32)	94 (34)	97 (36)	102 (39)	107 (42)	101 (38)	96 (36)	85 (29)	79 (26)	72 (22)	101 (38)
Mean maximum °F (°C)	53 (12)	56 (13)	67 (19)	80 (27)	89 (32)	90 (32)	92 (33)	89 (32)	86 (30)	76 (24)	68 (20)	57 (14)	93 (34)
Mean daily maximum °F (°C)	33.4 (0.8)	36.5 (2.5)	45.4 (7.4)	58.5 (14.7)	69.4 (20.8)	76.6 (24.8)	81.7 (27.6)	79.7 (26.5)	72.1 (22.3)	59.8 (15.4)	47.6 (8.7)	38.0 (3.3)	58.2 (14.6)
Daily mean °F (°C)	24.0 (−4.4)	26.2 (−3.2)	34.3 (1.3)	45.8 (7.7)	56.6 (13.7)	65.0 (18.3)	70.0 (21.1)	68.0 (20.0)	60.6 (15.9)	48.9 (9.4)	38.9 (3.8)	29.5 (−1.4)	47.3 (8.5)
Mean daily minimum °F (°C)	14.7 (−9.6)	15.9 (−8.9)	23.2 (−4.9)	33.1 (0.6)	43.7 (6.5)	53.2 (11.8)	58.2 (14.6)	56.4 (13.6)	49.2 (9.6)	38.0 (3.3)	29.0 (−1.7)	20.9 (−6.2)	36.3 (2.4)
Mean minimum °F (°C)	−4 (−20)	−3 (−19)	7 (−14)	21 (−6)	29 (−2)	41 (5)	49 (9)	46 (8)	35 (2)	25 (−4)	15 (−9)	2 (−17)	−7 (−22)
Record low °F (°C)	−20 (−29)	−19 (−28)	−10 (−23)	11 (−12)	25 (−4)	34 (1)	40 (4)	37 (3)	28 (−2)	18 (−8)	3 (−16)	−15 (−26)	−20 (−29)
Average precipitation inches (mm)	3.94 (100)	3.52 (89)	4.61 (117)	4.35 (110)	4.14 (105)	4.89 (124)	4.35 (110)	4.85 (123)	4.99 (127)	5.40 (137)	4.21 (107)	5.00 (127)	54.25 (1,376)
Average snowfall inches (cm)	14.7 (37)	15.8 (40)	12.7 (32)	2.6 (6.6)	0.0 (0.0)	0.0 (0.0)	0.0 (0.0)	0.0 (0.0)	0.0 (0.0)	0.5 (1.3)	2.6 (6.6)	12.0 (30)	60.9 (153.5)
Average extreme snow depth inches (cm)	10 (25)	12 (30)	11 (28)	2 (5.1)	0 (0)	0 (0)	0 (0)	0 (0)	0 (0)	1 (2.5)	2 (5.1)	8 (20)	12 (30)
Average precipitation days (≥ 0.01 in)	12.6	10.3	11.9	12.7	13.8	12.9	11.7	10.9	10.5	11.8	11.1	12.8	143
Average snowy days (≥ 0.01 in)	8.9	8.2	5.7	1.5	0.0	0.0	0.0	0.0	0.0	0.0	1.8	6.7	32.8
Source: NOAA

== Demographics ==
Historical population
Census	Pop.	Note	%±
1790	1,400		—
1800	1,417		1.2%
1810	1,586		11.9%
1820	1,449		−8.6%
1830	1,651		13.9%
1840	1,707		3.4%
1850	1,916		12.2%
1860	2,278		18.9%
1870	2,893		27.0%
1880	3,327		15.0%
1890	4,283		28.7%
1900	8,360		95.2%
1910	15,483		85.2%
1920	20,623		33.2%
1930	26,040		26.3%
1940	26,988		3.6%
1950	27,820		3.1%
1960	30,045		8.0%
1970	31,952		6.3%
1980	30,987		−3.0%
1990	33,687		8.7%
2000	35,202		4.5%
2010	36,383		3.4%
2020	35,515		−2.4%
U.S. Decennial Census

=== 2020 census ===
As of the 2020 census, Torrington had a population of 35,515. The median age was 44.6 years. 18.4% of residents were under the age of 18 and 20.0% of residents were 65 years of age or older. For every 100 females there were 96.8 males, and for every 100 females age 18 and over there were 94.3 males age 18 and over.

91.3% of residents lived in urban areas, while 8.7% lived in rural areas.

There were 15,490 households in Torrington, of which 23.6% had children under the age of 18 living in them. Of all households, 39.1% were married-couple households, 22.2% were households with a male householder and no spouse or partner present, and 30.0% were households with a female householder and no spouse or partner present. About 35.2% of all households were made up of individuals and 14.9% had someone living alone who was 65 years of age or older.

There were 17,040 housing units, of which 9.1% were vacant. The homeowner vacancy rate was 1.8% and the rental vacancy rate was 5.8%.

Racial composition as of the 2020 census
Race	Number	Percent
White	27,238	76.7%
Black or African American	1,250	3.5%
American Indian and Alaska Native	185	0.5%
Asian	903	2.5%
Native Hawaiian and Other Pacific Islander	15	0.0%
Some other race	2,685	7.6%
Two or more races	3,239	9.1%
Hispanic or Latino (of any race)	5,433	15.3%

=== 2000 census ===
As of the census of 2000, there were 35,202 people, 14,743 households, and 9,125 families residing in the city. The population density was 884.7 inhabitants per square mile (341.6/km^{2}). There were 16,147 housing units at an average density of 405.8 per square mile (156.7/km^{2}). The racial makeup of the city was 93.03% White, 2.15% Black or African American, 0.20% Native American, 1.83% Asian, 0.02% Pacific Islander, 1.31% from other races, and 1.47% from two or more races. Hispanic or Latino of any race were 3.30% of the population.

There were 14,743 households, out of which 28.5% had children under the age of 18 living with them, 47.7% were married couples living together, 10.3% had a female householder with no husband present, and 38.1% were non-families. 32.1% of all households were made up of individuals, and 13.7% had someone living alone who was 65 years of age or older. The average household size was 2.33 and the average family size was 2.96.

In the city, the population was spread out, with 23.0% under the age of 18, 6.4% from 18 to 24, 31.0% from 25 to 44, 22.0% from 45 to 64, and 17.6% who were 65 years of age or older. The median age was 39 years. For every 100 females, there were 93.9 males. For every 100 females age 18 and over, there were 89.0 males.

The median income for a household in the city was $41,841, and the median income for a family was $54,375. Males had a median income of $37,702 versus $28,418 for females. The per capita income for the city was $21,406.

== Government ==
Torrington is governed by a mayor and a six member Board of Councilmen. Torrington also elects a board of education, a board of public safety, city clerk, and a city treasurer.

== Transportation ==
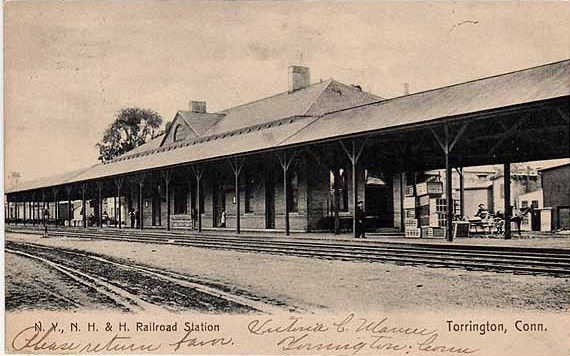
1907 postcard of the Torrington railroad station

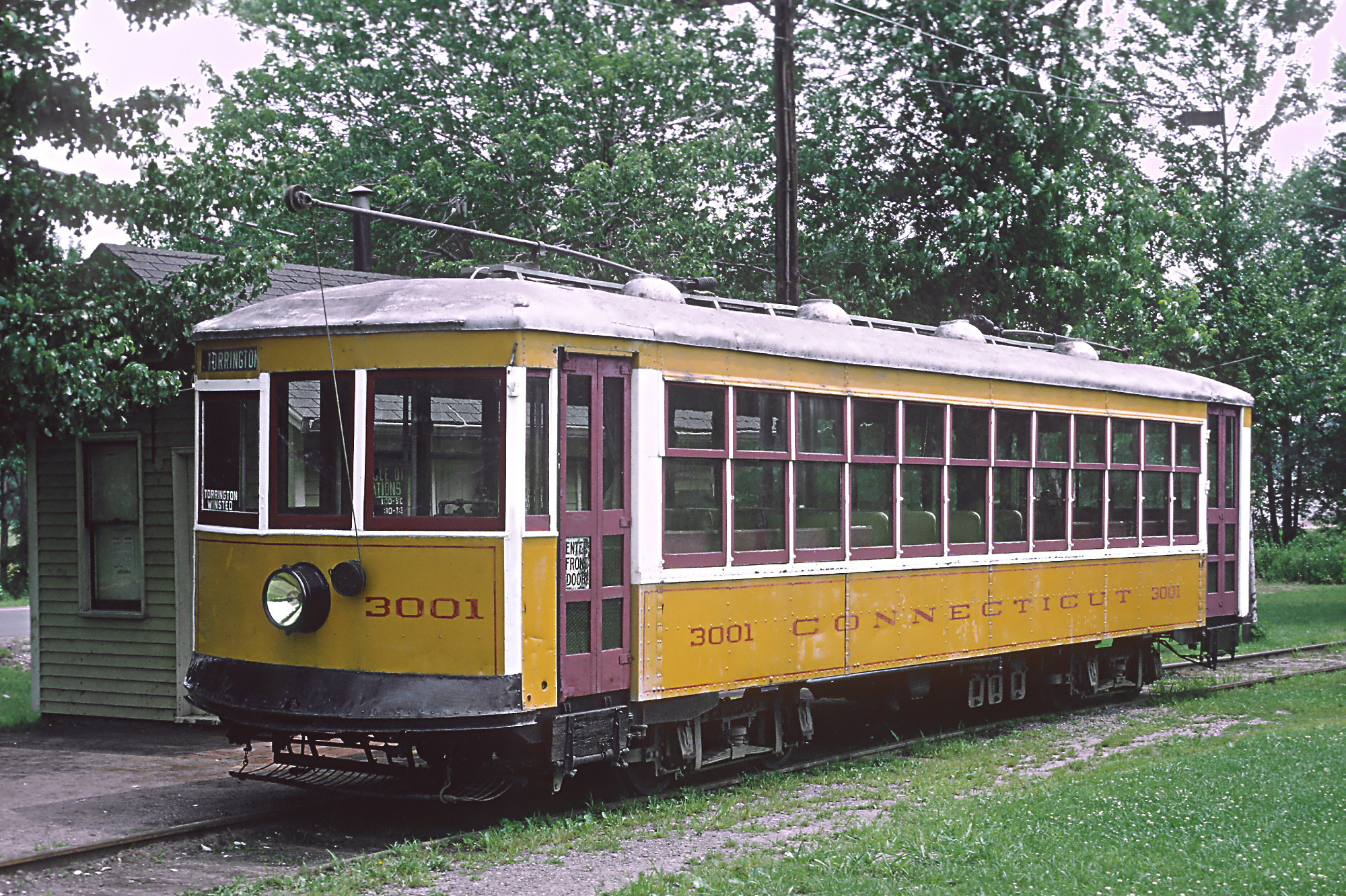
Former Connecticut Company Torrington Division streetcar, seen at the Connecticut Trolley Museum

Three primary highways meet in downtown Torrington: Route 8, Route 4, and Route 202. Other major roads include Route 183 and Route 272. The city is served by buses of the Northwestern Connecticut Transit District. Northeast Transportation Company operates connecting service to Waterbury.

There is freight rail service operated by the Naugatuck Railroad extending up the Waterbury Branch to Torrington.

Bradley International Airport (BDL) in Windsor Locks is the closest major commercial airport to Torrington.

== Infrastructure ==
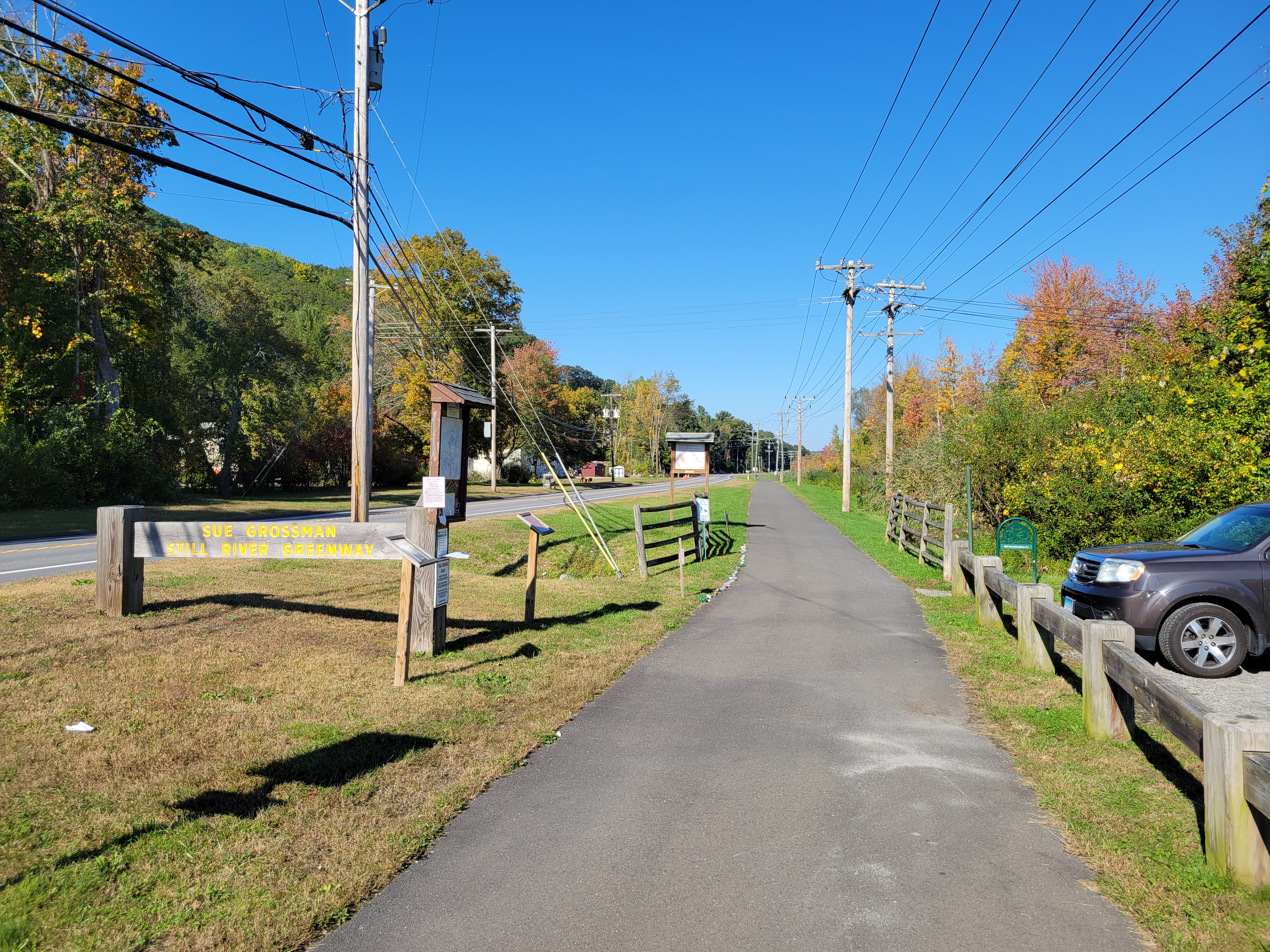
Sue Grossman Still River Greenway entrance

=== Main Street Marketplace ===
Main Street Marketplace (MSMP) was created in 2009 by founders Steve Criss, Rose Ponte, Jessica Hodorski and the 2009 ACT Commissioners. The original idea for MSMP was to create an event to bring families together downtown to support the local merchants. Since 2009, MSMP brings in about 3,000 visitors a night, has 40–45 exhibitors, 15–20 food vendors, non-profit exhibitors, and a variety of different types of performers every night. It was a multi-week event that ran consecutively during the summer on a specified weeknight from 5 to 9 o'clock. Main Street was shut down and the marketplace extended from Water Street to Alvord Street.

=== City financial report (2004) ===
The City of Torrington typically collects 100% of taxes owed through the use of private tax collectors.

The 2004 General Fund budgetary fund balance was $5.8 million. The city has bonded debt outstanding of $36.8 million for governmental activities and $4.2 million for business type (WPCA). All current outstanding bonded debt will be retired by the year 2021 (current estimate).

Torrington's bond rating is A1.

In 2004, total revenue was $88,444,157: Property Taxes (64.40%), Board of Education Grants (23.44%), Federal & State Grants (7.06%), General Government (3.67%), Public Safety (0.64%), Public Works (0.53%), Invest Income (0.26%), and Recreation (0.01%).

Total expenditures and encumbrances were $88,679,873: Board of Education (53.41%), Public Safety (12.97%), Pension & Miscellaneous (10.58%), Public Works (8.34%), Debt Services (7.69%), General Government (3.49%), Public Health & Social Services (1.99%), Operating Transfers Out (0.85%), Recreation (0.40%), Second Part Budget (0.29%).

== Crime and law enforcement ==
The number of violent crimes recorded by the FBI in 2003 was 139. The number of homicides was 0. The violent crime rate was 3.9 per 1,000 people.

In 1984–1985, Torrington's Police Department was sued by Tracey Thurman, who was nearly killed in 1983 by her estranged husband Charles "Buck" Thurman. In Thurman v. City of Torrington (finalized 1985), the federal court levied a $2.3 million judgment against the city for refusing to enforce its previous restraining orders because the perpetrator was married to the victim. Thurman's abuse, attempted murder and lawsuit were later depicted in a 1989 made-for-TV movie A Cry for Help: The Tracey Thurman Story, starring Nancy McKeon.

In March 2013, Torrington received a degree of national notoriety for a statutory rape case involving three teen-aged boys accused of sexually assaulting two 13-year-old girls. Joan Toribio and Edgar Gonzalez, both 18, were among the accused. Both were popular high school football players, who claimed that the encounters were consensual. The third male, Dylan Rodriguez, was underage himself. Several dozen Torrington High School students rallied around the accused and allegedly aggressively bullied the victims online. One of the victims was called a “hoe” on her Facebook page and blamed for "ruining the lives" of the accused. Despite receiving national criticism, Torrington High School students continued to use social media to support the defendants, posting online photos while diminishing the validity and severity of the victim's claims.

== Sports teams/events ==
=== Baseball ===
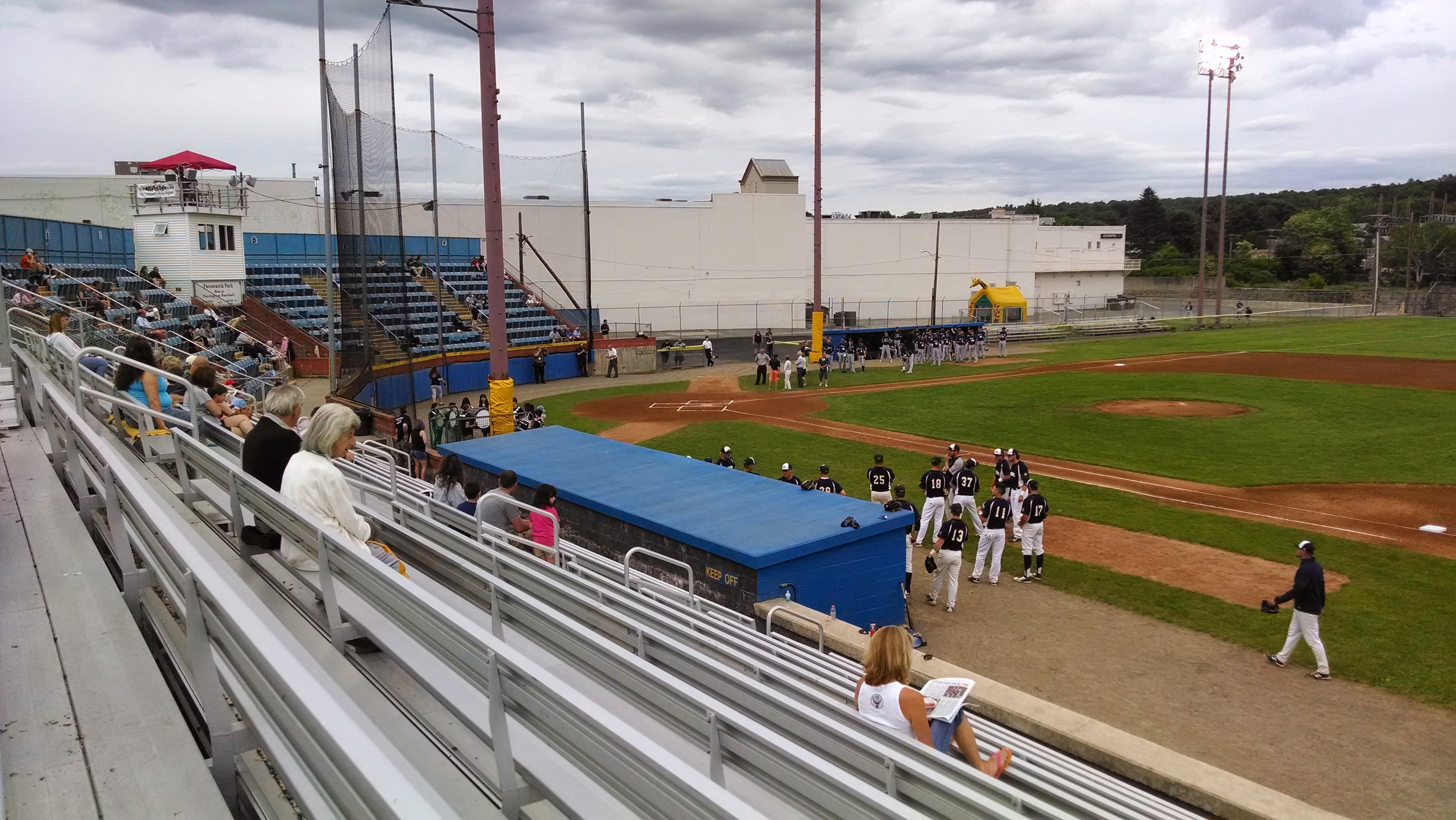
Fuessenich Park in Torrington (June 2014)

A professional baseball team and two collegiate baseball teams have played their home games at Fuessenich Park.

The Torrington Titans played in the Futures Collegiate Baseball League (FCBL) of New England. They played their inaugural season in the Atlantic Collegiate Baseball League (ACBL), a collegiate summer baseball league. After leading the ACBL in attendance in 2010, the team was sold to the Carminucci Sports Group (CSG), which transferred their affiliation to the Futures League. CSG also owns or owned the Brockton Rox of the professional Can-Am League and the Martha's Vineyard Sharks of the FCBL.

In 2009, an organization called Our Baseball Haven, introduced a unique concept and proposal through which a collegiate baseball team could once again call Torrington its home. The concept, called "crowdsourcing" was supported by some five hundred individuals and the Peekskill (NY) Robins of the Atlantic Collegiate Baseball League (ACBL) were moved to Torrington and their name changed to the Torrington Titans. The Titans capped their successful 2010 inaugural season by winning the Kaiser Division. The Titans did not return for the 2017 season

The Torrington Twisters were a member of the New England Collegiate Baseball League (NECBL) from 1997 to 2008. Torrington twice played host to the league All-Star Game (1998, 2008) and generally placed high in their division each season. The organization made an abrupt move to Massachusetts after 2008.

A professional baseball team once located in the city was known as the Torrington Braves, and were a member of the Colonial League. After just one season, 1950, they disbanded.

=== Running ===
The Torrington Road Race is a five-mile (8 km) run, which coincides with Donor's Week in August. Starting at Coe Memorial Park, the course extends to the farther reaches of the valley, including Riverside Avenue, Migeon Avenue, Prospect Street and others. The race, which started in 1972, primarily includes runners from around Connecticut and has also attracted some runners each year from Massachusetts, New York, New Jersey, Pennsylvania, and others. The record time for the race was 24:22 by Evance Rotich in 2008. Chris Chisholm holds the record for number of times winning the race with six (1984, 2002–2003, 2013–2015), and Anne Curi-Preisig holds the record for most first-place woman finishes with six (1990–1991, 1993–1996). Rosa Moriello is the only woman to finish as the overall winner of the race, with a time of 27:55 in 2012.

=== High school sports ===
Torrington High School typically offers football, soccer, volleyball, cross country, swimming, basketball, track, baseball, softball, tennis, and golf, as well as cheerleading and dance.

The Torrington High School Athletic Hall of Fame has elected more than 100 individuals since 1998.

In 2006, the Torrington High School Men's Basketball team captured their first Connecticut State Championship since 1944, beating rival high school Holy Cross of Waterbury.

== On the National Register of Historic Places ==
- Downtown Torrington Historic District—Roughly bounded by Church and Alvord Streets., Center Cemetery, Willow Street, East Main Street, Litchfield Street, and Prospect Street (added 1988)
- Fyler-Hotchkiss Estate—192 Main Street (added 1987)
- James Alldis House—355 Prospect Street (added 1982)

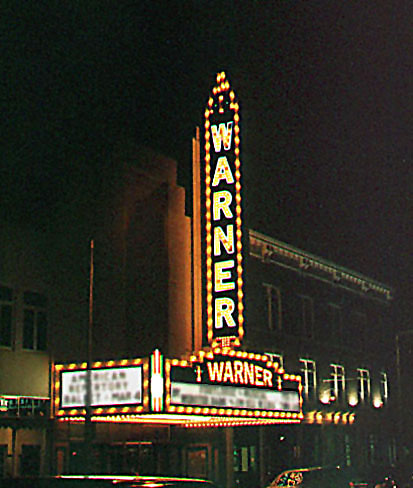
The Warner Theatre in Torrington, CT.

- Migeon Avenue Historic District—Roughly along Migeon Avenue and parts of Forest Street (added 2002)
- Paugnut Forest Administration Building—385 Burr Mountain Road (added 1986)
- Skee's Diner—589 Main Street (added 2002)
- South School—362 South Main Street (added 1986)
- Torringford Street Historic District—Torringford Street from East Main Street to West Hill Road. (added 1991)
- Torrington Fire Department Headquarters—117 Water Street (added 1987)
- Villa Friuli—58 High Street (added 1991)
- Warner Theatre—68-82 Main Street (added 1984)
- Warrenton Woolen Mill—839 Main Street (added 1987)
- Water Street Historic District—Roughly along Water Street, from Church Street to Prospect Street (added 2003)

== Notable people ==
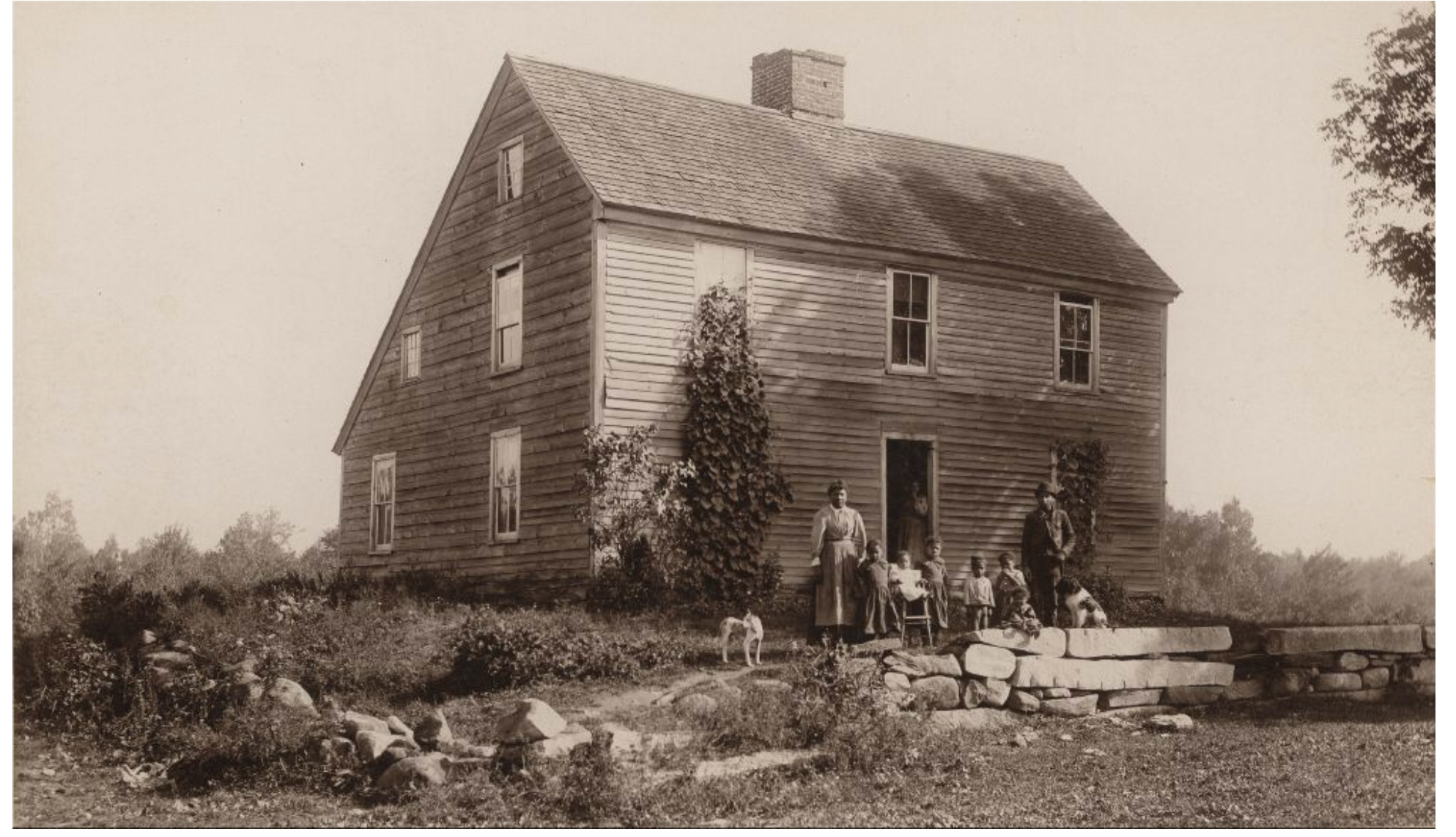
John Brown's birthplace in Torrington. An engraved stone denotes the site where the house stood (located on John Brown Road)

- John Brown (1800–1859), abolitionist, was born in Torrington
- Josiah Bunting III (born 1939), author, educator, soldier and Superintendent of the Virginia Military Institute
- W. G. Curtis (1857–1913), a homesteader and politician, lived in Torrington, Connecticut, and later founded and named the town of Torrington, Wyoming after his former residence
- Bill C. Davis (1961–2021), playwright, was living in Torrington at the time of his death
- Dick Ebersol (born 1947), chairman of NBC Universal Sports, was born in Torrington
- Frank Fixaris (1934–2006), Maine sportscaster, was born in Torrington and grew up at 600 Prospect Street
- Aline Huke Frink (1904–2000), mathematician, professor at Pennsylvania State University, born in Torrington
- Ellen Maria Huntington Gates (1835–1920), hymn writer and poet
- Horace Holley (1887–1960), prominent follower of the Baha'i Faith was born in Torrington
- Samuel John Mills (1783–1818), Congregationalist missionary
- Wendell Phillips Norton Sr. (1861–1955), inventor of a mechanical gear shift on the Hendy-Norton lathe
- Lyman Cornelius Smith (1850–1910), an industrialist and founder of the L.C. Smith & Brothers Typewriter Company, which grew into the Smith-Corona Company, was born here
- William L. Shirer, Author of “The Rise and Fall of the Third Reich”, lived on the 40 acre estate on Stillwater Pond Road (formerly, Brass Mill Dam Road); once the location of Torrington’s first dairy farm.
- Steven Strogatz, American mathematician and popularizer of mathematics, born in Torrington
- Karl Swenson (1908–1978), actor, who died in Torrington
- Tracey Thurman, a victim of domestic violence who drew national attention in 1985
- Zena Temkin (1923–2017), member of the Connecticut House of Representatives from Torrington
- Patricia Wald (1928–2019), first female judge of the Washington, D.C., circuit, was born and raised in Torrington
- Jordan Williams (born 1990), basketball center for the Maryland Terrapins and the New Jersey Nets
- Jocko Willink (born 1971), US Navy SEAL Lt. Commander, Author, Podcaster. Born in Torrington
