= List of Dual Survival episodes =

Episodes of the Dual Survival series

Dual Survival is a cable television series that airs on the Discovery Channel.

== Series overview ==
Season	Episodes	Cast		Originally aired	
Season	Episodes	Cast		First aired	Last aired
1	10	Cody Lundin	Dave Canterbury	June 11, 2010	August 20, 2010
2	12	Cody Lundin	Dave Canterbury	April 22, 2011	July 1, 2011
3	11	Cody Lundin	Joseph Teti	January 1, 2013	March 13, 2013
4	10	Cody Lundin; Matt Graham	Joseph Teti	April 23, 2014	June 25, 2014
5	13	Matt Graham	Joseph Teti	January 21, 2015	April 22, 2015
6	4	Matt Graham	Joseph Teti	September 30, 2015	October 21, 2015
7	10	Bill McConnell	Grady Powell	January 13, 2016	March 15, 2016
8	7	Josh James; Bo McGlone	Grady Powell	June 15, 2016	August 3, 2016
9	7	Jeff Zausch	EJ Snyder	August 24, 2016	October 12, 2016

== Episodes ==
=== Season 1 (2010) ===
No.	Title	Original release date
1	"Shipwrecked"	June 11, 2010
Stranded on an island off the coast of Nova Scotia in the dead of winter, Cody Lundin and Dave Canterbury salvage materials from a life raft, build a shelter and start a fire. They work as a team to gather food and water.
2	"Failed Ascent"	June 18, 2010
In this episode, Canterbury’s alpine experience becomes crucial as he and Lundin are stranded in New Zealand atop a mountain with limited supplies. Lundin always walks around barefoot, but given the environment and freezing conditions, he is forced to improvise by donning socks as he and Canterbury navigate across 8,000-foot (2,400 m) glacial peaks, cross deadly crevasses and traverse deep rocky canyons.
3	"Out of Air"	June 25, 2010
In this episode, the pair takes on the scenario of lost cave divers in Belize who, equipped only with masks, fins, wet suits, a buoyancy compensator and flashlights, must find their way out of the cave and through the jungle.
4	"Desert Breakdown"	July 2, 2010
Lundin and Canterbury play the roles of two people whose car has broken down miles from civilization. The pair must make their way through Peru's Valley of the Volcanoes.
5	"Panic in the Jungle"	July 9, 2010
Lost in the jungles of Laos, Lundin and Canterbury bushwhack their way to a wide river. To safely travel down it, they build a bamboo raft that must be strong enough to survive rapids.
6	"Swamped"	July 16, 2010
Lundin and Canterbury are stuck in a 1,000-square-mile (2,600 km^{2}) maze of swamps and bogs in the Louisiana bayou, home to 1.5 million alligators and six species of venomous snakes, including the cottonmouth.
7	"Split Up"	July 23, 2010
In this episode, Lundin and Canterbury are stranded and separated in Arizona's arid climate. Canterbury is in the Ponderosa Pine forest, 8,000 feet (2,400 m) above sea level, while Lundin is in high desert scrub country.
8	"Soaked"	July 30, 2010
Lundin and Canterbury play two hunters stranded by their overturned canoe deep in the forests of Washington's Olympic Peninsula.
9	"After the Storm"	August 13, 2010
Lundin and Canterbury are two hurricane survivors in the Dominican Republic whom resort to turn trash littering the beach into survival gear. Canterbury ignores Lundin by hunting deadly creatures while making their way to the coast and ultimately, rescue.
10	"Bogged Down"	August 20, 2010
In the season finale, Lundin and Canterbury are deep inside the world's largest swamp wetland - Brazil's Pantanal. The pair must wade through piranha-infested waters to find civilization, and when they find a river, Lundin's homemade canoe struggles to hold their combined weight.

=== Season 2 (2011) ===
No.	Title	Original release date	U.S. viewers (millions)
1 (11)	"Slash and Burn"	April 22, 2011	N/A
Lundin and Canterbury head 500 miles off the coast of Antarctica to see if they can handle the remote archipelago of Tierra Del Fuego.
2 (12)	"Buried Alive"	April 29, 2011	N/A
Lundin and Canterbury travel to Wyoming's Rocky Mountains and encounter snow, frozen waterfalls and steep cliffs.
3 (13)	"Stuck In The Muck"	May 6, 2011	N/A
In this episode, Lundin and Canterbury are sent to Florida to cross the swamps of the Everglades. They worry about dehydration and the dangerous creatures that inhabit the area. For food, Dave tracks down a Burmese python ‒ an invasive, non-native species ‒ and dispatches it with a machete.
4 (14)	"Bitten"	May 13, 2011	N/A
With minimal equipment Lundin and Canterbury visit Thailand where dense jungles and barren caves await them. They face intense temperatures and blood-sucking leeches throughout their trek.
5 (15)	"Frozen Plains"	May 20, 2011	1.5
This episode takes Lundin and Canterbury back to the Western US to face below-freezing temperatures in the Great Plains of Montana.
6 (16)	"Out Of Africa"	May 24, 2011	N/A
Lundin and Canterbury face wild predators in the biologically diverse backcountry of South Africa.
7 (17)	"Out Of The Clouds"	May 27, 2011	1.3
Lundin and Canterbury walk among clouds 7,000 feet above sea level in the humid cloud forests of Panama.
8 (18)	"Adrift"	June 3, 2011	1.6
Cast adrift in the South Pacific, Lundin and Canterbury must survive on a deserted island. For the first time, Lundin, is not the only one who goes barefoot.
9 (19)	"Eating Dust"	June 10, 2011	N/A
Lundin and Canterbury find themselves in the changing landscapes of Baja, Mexico where they must use every resource to their advantage, including their own urine.
10 (20)	"Hippo Island"	June 17, 2011	N/A
Lundin and Canterbury are in the marshland of Botswana's Okavango Delta where they encounter hippos, Africa's deadliest animal.
11 (21)	"Up The River"	June 24, 2011	N/A
Lundin and Canterbury are dropped separately in a river in the Appalachian highlands, Kentucky.
12 (22)	"Road To Nowhere"	July 1, 2011	N/A
In the season finale, Lundin and Canterbury are in northern Maine where they employ an abandoned truck.

=== Season 3 (2013) ===
No.	Title	Original release date	U.S. viewers (millions)
0	"Unbraided"	January 1, 2013	-----
Lundin and Teti give viewers a behind the scenes look concerning their backgrounds, outside of the show and provide their thoughts on future episodes they will be working on together.
1 (23)	"Mars on Earth"	January 1, 2013	1.530
Lundin and Teti go to Chile's Atacama Desert. They battle dehydration and drink their own urine.
2 (24)	"On the Menu"	January 8, 2013	1.563
Lundin and Teti are stranded in the South African grassland, encountering leopards and lions and hiding from poachers.
3 (25)	"Into the Frying Pan"	January 15, 2013	1.390
Lundin and Teti are in the Chihuahuan Desert, New Mexico. Teti struggles to get out of a mineshaft. Lundin and Teti later encounter and kill a rattlesnake; they also find a rotten cow carcass.
4 (26)	"Trouble in Paradise"	January 22, 2013	1.303
Lundin and Teti are stranded in the rainforest of an uninhabited island in Hawaii. They fight dehydration and introduced boars.
5 (27)	"The Green Hell"	January 29, 2013	1.460
Lundin and Teti arrive in the Amazon rainforest, Ecuador.
6 (28)	"Twin Peaks"	February 5, 2013	1.302
Lundin and Teti are stranded in the jungle of Nicaragua, where they are stranded on top of a volcano.
7 (29)	"Meltdown"	February 12, 2013	1.530
Lundin and Teti are stranded in the Zambian grasslands. Here, they encounter wildlife such as African elephants and hippos.
8 (30)	"Belly of the Beast"	February 19, 2013	1.603
Lundin and Teti are stranded in mountains of Romania.
9 (31)	"Castaways"	February 26, 2013	1.690
Lundin and Teti are stranded in Fiji. They show how to get back to civilization safely, facing sharks and limited resources.
10 (32)	"Rocky Mountain High"	March 5, 2013	1.561
Lundin and Teti are stranded in the Rocky Mountains in Colorado. They battle against hypothermia.
11 (33)	"Misty Mountain Drop"	March 13, 2013	1.780
Lundin and Teti are in the Californian mountains.

Prior to the debut of Season 4, Discovery Channel aired a select episode titled "Dual Survival: Untamed" with bonus scenes not originally shown on the initial broadcast.

=== Season 4 (2014) ===
No.	Title	Original release date	U.S. viewers (millions)
1 (34)	"No End in Sight, part 1"	April 23, 2014	1.167
Teti and Lundin are in a mangrove swamp in Sri Lanka.
2 (35)	"No End in Sight, part 2"	April 30, 2014	1.437
Teti and Lundin are in the jungle of Sri Lanka.
3 (36)	"Deadly Dunes"	May 7, 2014	1.284
Teti and Lundin are in the desert and mountains of Oman.
4 (37)	"Glacial Downfall"	May 14, 2014	1.528
Teti and Lundin are in Norway. This is their final episode together.
5 (38)	"Journey's End to a New Beginning"	May 21, 2014	1.282
The episode features footage from previous episodes, behind the scenes materials, and crew interviews.
6 (39)	"No Man Is an Island"	May 28, 2014	1.702
Teti and Matt Graham in their first episode together in Panama
7 (40)	"Mayan Mayhem"	June 4, 2014	1.584
Teti and Graham are in Mayan tunnels.
8 (41)	"On the Edge"	June 11, 2014	1.528
Teti and Graham are 15,000 feet above sea level on a mountain ridgeline.
9 (42)	"End of the Road"	June 18, 2014	1.506
Teti and Graham are stranded deep in the jungle of Vietnam.
10 (43)	"One Shot, One Kill"	June 25, 2014	1.608
Teti and Graham are lost in New Zealand’s Fiordland

=== Season 5 (2015) ===
No.	Title	Original release date	U.S. viewers (millions)
1 (44)	"Into the Canyons"	January 21, 2015	1.453
Teti and Graham are in the canyonlands of southern Utah.
2 (45)	"Grin and Bear It"	January 28, 2015	1.496
Teti and Graham are in the Allegheny Mountains of Pennsylvania.
3 (46)	"Downed and Out Part 1"	February 4, 2015	1.665
Teti and Graham are on an island at the site of plane crash in the Bermuda Triangle.
4 (47)	"Downed and Out Part 2"	February 11, 2015	1.670
Part 2 of when Teti and Graham are stranded on an island in the Bermuda Triangle.
5 (48)	"Swamplandia"	February 18, 2015	1.601
Teti and Graham take on the black water swamps of south Georgia.
6 (49)	"Out of the Ashes Part One"	February 25, 2015	1.298
Teti and Graham are stranded on a volcanic island off the coast of South America
7 (50)	"Out of the Ashes Part Two"	March 4, 2015	1.595
Teti and Graham are trapped on high ocean cliffs as they cross a volcanic island off the coast of South America.
8 (51)	"Waterlogged"	March 11, 2015	1.622
Teti and Graham deal with torrential rain, rapids, and deadly insects in the rainforest of Costa Rica
9 (52)	"Coastal Catastrophe"	March 18, 2015	1.615
Teti and Graham are stranded on the coast of the Pacific Northwest.
10 (53)	"Winter Vortex, Part One"	April 1, 2015	1.763
In Wyoming, the guys show viewers how to repurpose a broken snowmobile, use snow to build a shelter, and survive sub-freezing temperatures.
11 (54)	"Winter Vortex, Part Two"	April 8, 2015	1.688
In Wyoming, the guys show viewers how to repurpose a broken snowmobile, use snow to build a shelter, and survive sub-freezing temperatures.
12 (55)	"Himalayan Hardship"	April 15, 2015	1.467
In the Himalayas, Teti seeks rescue from the rocky terrain, dense forest, and animal threats while Graham seems more interested in achieving spiritual enlightenment than getting out alive.
13 (56)	"Namibian Nightmare"	April 22, 2015	1.879
Stranded in the vast scrubland of Namibia, Teti and Graham are in a race to get out alive from one of the driest countries on earth. They run into trouble with a troop of baboons.

=== Season 6 (2015) ===
No.	Title	Original release date	U.S. viewers (millions)
1 (57)	"Nautical Nightmare"	September 30, 2015	1.500
In the Atlantic Ocean, Joe Teti and Matt Graham are left with few supplies and a life raft. While they navigate the ocean, they face sharks and sharp coral. When they reach a nearby island they build shelters, hunt for stingrays, and encounter unpredictable weather during their search for rescue.
2 (58)	"Fractured Journey"	October 7, 2015	0.978
In the jungles of Belize, Joe Teti and Matt Graham set out for rescue with one member of the team acting out the scenario of being injured. They search for food, build shelter, and build a raft which they attempt to ride down a river in search of rescue.
3 (59)	"Escape and Evade"	October 14, 2015	1.194
In Texas near the U.S.-Mexican border, Joe Teti and Matt Graham play out the scenario of escaped hostages and show how to survive and get out to safety.
4 (60)	"Braving Bolivia"	October 21, 2015	1.211
Joe and Matt face a journey of epic proportions in the Bolivian Andes. From the world's largest salt flat 12,000ft above sea level, through a desert with toxic water and into mountain peaks, they're in a constant battle against dehydration and altitude sickness.

Note that "the rest" of season 6 is called season 7, with new survivalists.

=== Season 7 (2016) ===
No.	Title	Original release date	U.S. viewers (millions)
1 (61)	"Fire and Ice"	January 13, 2016	1.105
In the Chilean Andes, Grady and Bill start their survival mission high up on a snowy dormant volcano. They must get off the volcano, find shelter in caves, and trek down into the rainforest. Along the way, they search for food, and attempt to build a fire.
2 (62)	"Long Way Home"	January 20, 2016	0.983
Continuing in the Chilean Andes, Grady and Bill must survive a cold night in the rainforest. On their journey out they hunt feral pigs, build a shelter, and attempt to build a fire again.
3 (63)	"Take Me to the River"	January 27, 2016	1.142
In the Amazon rainforest, Bill and Grady must navigate through dense jungle, and build a shelter from the rains. They navigate to a river, attempt to catch fish, and build a raft to try to reach civilization.
4 (64)	"Eat or Be Eaten"	February 3, 2016	1.003
While stranded in the Zambezi River Basin, Grady and Bill attempt survival during Africa's dry season, on their trek to the Zambezi River. Along the way, they search for water, build a primitive fire, encounter a myriad of African wildlife and predators, and hunt for guinea fowl.
5 (65)	"Scorched Earth"	February 10, 2016	1.071
In the Namib Desert of southern Africa, Grady and Bill are left with a broken down car. They use the car to help them with survival tasks, catch and eat scorpions, create signals for rescue, and search for water and food in a nearby canyon.
6 (66)	"On Thin Ice"	February 17, 2016	0.990
In the cold and snow of the Sawtooth Mountains of Idaho, Bill and Grady begin their survival on a mountain ridge and make their way to a forested area where they discover a dilapidated cabin. After spending the night there, they navigate to a river, deal with hypothermic conditions after Grady partially breaks through the ice, and attempt to trap beaver.
7 (67)	"High and Dry"	February 24, 2016	1.071
Bill and Grady visit Oregon where they find themselves lost in a desert-type environment.
8 (68)	"Cuban Crisis"	March 2, 2016	1.075
In the remote swamps of Cuba, Grady and Bill must navigate to dry land while avoiding Cuban crocodiles. They desperately search for water, catch a turtle, and start a fire using a binocular lens. They then attempt to salvage a boat to help them find civilization.
9 (69)	"Saturation Point"	March 9, 2016	1.079
Bill and Grady try to survive in the remote part of Maine, USA, dealing with extreme cold weather, chilly nights and lack of fire.
10 (70)	"Live to Tell"	March 16, 2016	0.837
A behind the scenes look at Bill And Grady's journeys throughout the season. Also a sneak peek at Season 8

=== Season 8 (2016) ===
No.	Title	Original release date	U.S. viewers (millions)
1 (71)	"Croatian Castaway"	June 15, 2016	1.02
Grady and Josh are trapped in Croatia's Velebit Mountains.
2 (72)	"Mosquito Coast"	June 22, 2016	0.882
Grady and Josh are stranded in the Nicaraguan jungles.
3 (73)	"Bulgarian Blizzard"	July 6, 2016	0.990
Grady and Josh are stranded in Bulgaria's Rila mountains.
4 (74)	"Burning Island"	July 13, 2016	0.937
Josh and Grady become stranded in a Cambodian island.
5 (75)	"Out of Air"	July 20, 2016	0.837
Josh and Grady are stranded in a remote part of the Peruvian Andes, while Josh is struggling with high altitude sickness the pair must find their way back to civilisation.
6 (76)	"Snow Daze"	July 27, 2016	0.879
Grady and Bo McGlone are stranded in Wyoming's Big Horn Mountains.
7 (77)	"Colombian Chaos"	August 3, 2016	0.767
Grady and Bo McGlone are trapped in the Colombian rainforests.

=== Season 9 (2016) ===
No.	Title	Original release date	U.S. viewers (millions)
1 (78)	"Battle of Brazil"	August 24, 2016	0.873
EJ and Jeff survive the dry savanna of southern Brazil's Jalapao region
2 (79)	"Forest from Hell"	August 31, 2016	0.967
EJ and Jeff must survive in the Araucaria forests of South America.
3 (80)	"Dying of Thirst"	September 14, 2016	0.835
EJ and Jeff are stranded in the deserts of Utah.
4 (81)	"Gator Bait"	September 21, 2016	0.795
EJ and Jeff escape from the swamps of Louisiana's Atchafalaya Basin.
5 (82)	"Blackout"	September 28, 2016	0.768
Snyder and Zausch must find their way out of a cave in the Caucasus Mountains and avoid Brown bears who are active in the area.
6 (83)	"Tracking Lions"	October 5, 2016	0.755
Snyder and Zausch step into the shoes of a pair of biologists lost in an area with a large lion population in South Africa's Wild Coast Region
7 (84)	"Attack of the Elephants"	October 12, 2016	0.753
EJ and Jeff are stranded in the Okavango Delta
