= Cesar Millan =

Mexican dog trainer and TV personality

César Millán
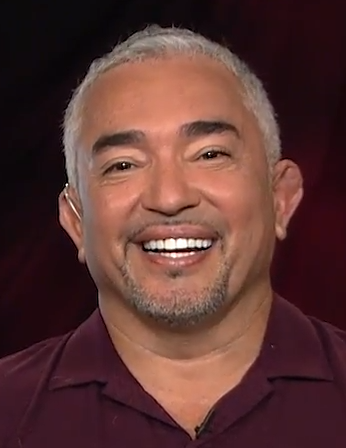
- Millan during an interview in March 2018
- Born: August 27, 1969 (age 57); Culiacán, Sinaloa, Mexico
- Citizenship: Mexico; United States
- Occupation: Dog trainer
- Years active: 2004–present
- Television: Dog Whisperer with Cesar Millan, Dog Nation, Cesar 911, Cesar Millan: Better Human Better Dog
- Spouse(s): Ilusión Wilson (m. 1994; div. 2010), Jahira Dar
- Children: 2
- Website: cesarmillan.com

César Felipe Millán Favela (/ˈsiːzər mɪˈlɑːn/ SEE-zər mil-AHN, Spanish: [ˈsesaɾ miˈʝan]; born August 27, 1969) is a Mexican-American dog trainer. His television series Dog Whisperer with Cesar Millan was produced from 2004 to 2012 and has been broadcast in more than 80 countries worldwide.

Prior to The Dog Whisperer series, Millan focused on rehabilitating severely aggressive dogs and founded a rehab complex, the Dog Psychology Center, in South Los Angeles (2002–2008).

With Ilusión Millan, his former wife, he founded the Millan Foundation, which was renamed to the Cesar Millan PACK Project. The foundation was established to provide financial support to animal shelters and organizations engaged in the rescuing, rehabilitating, and re-homing of abused and abandoned animals, and to fund spay/neuter programs.

Millan's first three books, including Cesar's Way, all became New York Times best sellers, have cumulatively sold two million copies in the United States, and are available in 14 other countries. Millan also has his own line of dog products and instructional DVDs.

== Early life ==
Millan was born on August 27, 1969, to Felipe Millán Guillén and María Teresa Favela in rural Culiacán, Sinaloa, Mexico. Millan grew up working with animals on the farm in Sinaloa where his grandfather, Teodoro Millán Angulo, was a tenant farmer. Because of his natural way with dogs, he was called el Perrero, "the dog herder". The family later moved to Mazatlán.

Millán crossed the border into the U.S in 1990 as an undocumented immigrant when he was 21 years old, speaking no English and with only US$100, in what he has described as a harrowing journey. He befriended Jada Pinkett Smith shortly after arriving in Los Angeles, and she set him up with one of her friends to learn English.

== Career ==
Millan's first job in the United States was at a dog grooming store. He later created the Pacific Point Canine Academy. Jada Pinkett Smith became one of Millan's first clients and supporters when he was working as a limousine driver, providing him with an English tutor for a year. Subsequently, Millan created the Dog Psychology Center, a two-acre (0.81 ha) facility in South Los Angeles, specializing in working with large breed dogs. In 2009, the Dog Psychology Center moved to Santa Clarita, California. Millan also opened an East Coast clinic at the Country Inn Pet Resort in Davie, Florida, near Fort Lauderdale.

In 2002, after a profile in the Los Angeles Times, Millan worked with MPH Entertainment, Inc. developing a television pilot for Dog Whisperer, a reality television series that follows Millan as he works in the field of dog rehabilitation. The series premiered on September 13, 2004, on the National Geographic Channel, subsequently moving to the Nat Geo Wild channel. The show would become National Geographic's No. 1 show during its first season and was broadcast in more than eighty countries worldwide during its run. The final episode of the show was broadcast in the U.S. on September 15, 2012.

In 2009, in conjunction with IMG, Millan introduced a monthly magazine also titled Cesar's Way, with The Wall Street Journal reporting at that time that half of American consumers recognized Millan. The magazine combined advice from Millan along with articles about the relationship between dogs and humans. The magazine ceased publication after its November/December 2014 issue.

The documentary television series Cesar Millan's Leader of the Pack aired on the Nat Geo Wild channel from January 5 to March 26, 2013. The next year, 2014, saw the premiere of Millan's new series, Cesar 911, on Nat Geo Wild; in non-American markets, it is known as Cesar to the Rescue. In 2015, he teamed up with children's television veterans Sid and Marty Krofft to create Mutt & Stuff, a preschool television show for the Nickelodeon channel. Millan's son Calvin stars in the series. In 2017, Millan and his older son Andre appeared in a new series Cesar Millan's Dog Nation, which ran for one season starting on March 3.

"Cesar Millan Live!" is an international touring dog training lecture and stage performance where Millan presents his techniques and philosophy from his television shows and books in front of a live audience. The show consists of one-half lecture and one-half demonstration with local shelter dogs, in which he uses his pack-leader training techniques to modify negative behaviors.

=== Dog training technique ===
Millan's work focuses on handling a dog with what he calls "calm-assertive energy". He believes that dog owners should establish their role as calm-assertive pack leaders. According to Millan, dogs have three primary needs: exercise, discipline and affection, in that order. In other words, it is the owner's responsibility to fulfill the dog's energy level needs through challenging exercise; then to provide clearly communicated rules, boundaries and limitations; and finally, to provide affection.

According to Millan, a common pitfall for American dog owners is to give a great deal of affection with very little exercise and even less discipline. He encourages owners to understand the effect their own attitudes, internal emotions and physical postures have on a dog's behavior, counseling owners to hold strong posture (i.e., shoulders high and chest forward) and to project energy that is calm-assertive.

Millan's TV programs are centered on the rehabilitation of dogs while Millan concurrently educates the dog owners in his dog-handling philosophy. Conversations with owners typically revolve around his philosophy: that healthy, balanced dogs require strong "pack leadership" from their owners, while Millan demonstrates how owners can achieve and maintain a leadership role with their dogs.

In some cases, Millan takes dogs with severe behavioral problems to his Dog Psychology Center for an extended period of more intensive rehabilitation. The programs are not intended as a dog training guide, and each episode contains repeated warnings that viewers should not try the behavior modification techniques at home without the guidance of a professional.

While working with a dog, Millan often uses vocal marks, gestures, and body language to communicate with dogs rather than speech or the dog's name. Millan encourages owners to create their own unique sound that works for them. He believes that dogs sense, understand, and respond to a person's energy more easily than their speech.

Millan has said, "My goal in rehabilitating dogs and training people is to create balanced relationships between humans and canines." In 2009, The New York Times attributed Millan's success to his personal sense of balance, describing this as "a sort of über-balanced mien".

One of Millan's dogs, Daddy, was an American Pit Bull Terrier integral to Millan's work and his television series, The Dog Whisperer. Millan later selected another pit bull puppy, Junior, as Daddy's protégé — to apprentice, learn his temperament and prepare to assume Daddy's role after his death. Daddy's death came at age 16 in February 2010. After the death of Daddy, Junior assumed Daddy's role and helped Millan with rehabilitating dogs by using what Millan refers to as calm, assertive energy.

=== Criticism ===
According to a January 2007 article in the Indian scientific journal Current Science, some professional Indian dog trainers find Millan's methods outdated, flawed and "unscientific and inhumane." Millan's critics say that what Millan calls "calm submission" is in reality a state of helplessness that is the result of adverse dog training techniques. Canadian journalist Malcolm Gladwell, writing in The New Yorker, claimed that critics were responding to the "highly edited" version of Millan's approach shown on television, which exaggerates the frequency and intensity that he uses when he disciplines the dogs.

In October 2012, Millan appeared on The Alan Titchmarsh Show. Titchmarsh called his methods "cruel" and "unnecessary", citing a video in which, according to Titchmarsh, Millan punched a dog in the throat. Millan defended himself by calling it a touch, not a punch. Titchmarsh read out an RSPCA statement saying that "Adverse training techniques which have been seen to be used by Cesar Millan can cause pain and fear for dogs and may worsen their behavioural problems."

In March 2016, the American Humane Association responded to complaints about an episode on a Nat Geo reality television series stating that the treatment of the animals did not meet their “Guidelines for the Safe Use of Animals in Filmed Media.”

In 2016, AVSAB American Veterinary Society of Animal Behavior published a response to the airing of the popular TV show Cesar 911, in which a dog being trained by Cesar Millan attacked and injured a pig and stated, "When the problem behavior involves a negative reaction to another animal, attempting to elicit the bad behavior so it can be 'corrected' is not only ineffective, it puts the target animal at risk of injury. Such training methods are unacceptable."

=== Legal issues ===
In 2006, Millan was sued by a television producer who alleged his dog was choked and forced to run on a treadmill at Millan's Dog Psychology Center. In 2015, Millan was sued by a Florida nurse after she was attacked by a dog that Millan had released from his Dog Psychology Center earlier that week.

In 2021, gymnast Lidia Matiss sued Millan demanding $850,000, alleging that she had been attacked by his dog Junior several years before, and that Millan was liable because Junior had previously killed Queen Latifah's dog, so Millan should have known that Junior was dangerous. Millan publicly denied these claims. The lawsuit was later settled out of court.

== Personal life ==
Millan became a permanent resident of the United States in 2000, and became a United States citizen in 2009. He lives in Los Angeles, California.

He married Ilusión Wilson in 1994, with whom he has two sons. In May 2010, after his dog Daddy died in February and he learned of his wife's intent to divorce him, Millan attempted suicide. In June 2010, Ilusión Millan filed for divorce.

In August 2016, Milan announced he was engaged to Jahira Dar. He later confirmed their marriage during an interview in 2021.

== Filmography ==
Film
Year	Title	Role	Notes
2008	Beethoven's Big Break	Himself	
2010	The Back-Up Plan	Himself	
2019	Trouble	Himself	Voice

Television
Year	Title	Role	Notes
2004	America's Top Dog	Himself / Judge	TV special
2004–2012, 2013, 2016	Dog Whisperer with Cesar Millan	Himself / Host / Narrator	189 episodes
2007	Ghost Whisperer	Himself	Episode: Children of Ghosts (S02E18)
2008	Bones	Himself	Episode: "The Finger in the Nest"
2008	The Girls Next Door	Himself	Episode: "Everyday Is Wednesday"
2010	The Apprentice	Himself	Episode: "Episode #10.3"
2013	Cesar Millan: Doggie Nightmares	Himself	TV special
2014	How Human Are You?	Himself / Host	Documentary
2014	Cesar Millan's Socialization	Himself	Documentary
2014	Cesar Millan: Love My Pit Bull	Himself	Documentary
2014	Jeopardy!	Himself / Video Clue Presenter	Episode: "Episode #31.7"
2014–2016	Cesar 911	Himself / Host	13 episodes; also as executive producer
2015	Cesar Millan: Viva Las Vegas!	Himself	TV special
2015–2016	Mutt & Stuff	Himself	15 episodes; also as executive producer
2017	Cesar's Recruit: Asia	Himself / Host	7 episodes; also as executive producer
2018	Red Table Talk	Himself	Guest; Episode: "Cesar Millan: Illegal Immigrant to American Dream"
2021–2023	Cesar Millan: Better Human Better Dog	Himself	36 episodes; also as executive producer

=== Bibliography ===
- Cesar Millan; Melissa Jo Peltier (March 2007). Cesar's Way: The Natural, Everyday Guide to Understanding and Correcting Common Dog Problems. New York: Three Rivers Press. ISBN 978-0-307-33797-9. OCLC 62134773.
- Cesar Millan; Melissa Jo Peltier (March 2007). Be the Pack Leader: Use Cesar's Way to Transform Your Dog . . . and Your Life. New York: Three Rivers Press. ISBN 978-0-307-38167-5.
- Cesar Millan; Melissa Jo Peltier (March 2008). A Member of the Family: Cesar Millan's Guide to a Lifetime of Fulfillment with Your Dog. New York: Three Rivers Press. ISBN 978-0-307-40891-4.
- Cesar Millan; Melissa Jo Peltier (2009). How to Raise the Perfect Dog: Through Puppyhood and Beyond. New York: Three Rivers Press. ISBN 978-0-307-46129-2.
- Cesar Millan; Melissa Jo Peltier (2010). Cesar's Rules: Your Way to Train a Well-Behaved Dog. New York: Crown Archetype. ISBN 978-0-307-71686-6.
- Cesar Millan (2013). Cesar Millan's Short Guide to a Happy Dog: 98 Essential Tips and Techniques. Washington, D.C.: National Geography Society. ISBN 978-1-4262-1190-4.
- Cesar Millan; Melissa Jo Peltier (2017). Cesar Millan's Lesson's from the Pack: Stories of the Dogs Who Changed My Life. Washington, D.C.: National Geography Society. ISBN 978-1-4262-16138.

=== Videography ===
- Cesar Millan's Mastering Leadership Series, Volume 1: People Training for Dogs (2005)
- Cesar Millan's Mastering Leadership Series, Volume 2: Becoming a Pack Leader (2006)
- Cesar Millan's Mastering Leadership Series, Volume 3: Your New Dog: First Day and Beyond (2007)
- Cesar Millan's Mastering Leadership Series, Volume 4: Sit and Stay the Cesar Way (2008)
- Cesar Millan's Mastering Leadership Series, Volume 5: Common Canine Misbehaviors (2009)
- Cesar Millan's Mastering Leadership Series, Volume 6: Raising the Perfect Puppy (2010)
- Dog Whisperer with Cesar Millan – The Complete First Season (2006)
- Dog Whisperer with Cesar Millan – The Complete Second Season (2007)
- Dog Whisperer with Cesar Millan – The Complete Third Season (2008)
- Dog Whisperer with Cesar Millan – Celebrity Edition (2008)
- Dog Whisperer with Cesar Millan – The Complete Fourth Season, Volume 1 (2010)
- Dog Whisperer with Cesar Millan – The Complete Fourth Season, Volume 2 (2010)
- Dog Whisperer with Cesar Millan – Season 5 (2011)
- Dog Whisperer with Cesar Millan – Season 6 (2009)
- Cesar Millan's Leader of the Pack (2013)
- Cesar Millan: Love My Pit Bull (2014)
- Essentials of Dog Behavior, Volume 1: Socialization (2014)
- Essentials of Dog Behavior, Volume 2: The Language of Dogs (2015)
- Cesar Millan: Viva Las Vegas (2015)
- Mutt & Stuff, Season 1 (2015)
- Mutt & Stuff, Season 2 (2016)
