= Casey Anderson (naturalist) =

American naturalist

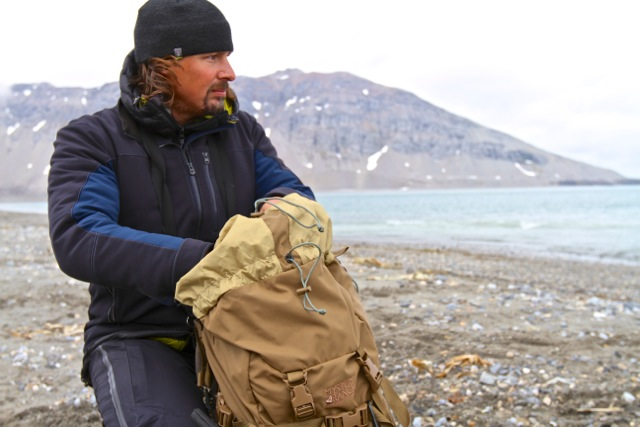
- Casey Anderson in 2013
- Born: East Helena, Montana
- Education: Montana State University
- Spouses: Missi Pyle (m. 2008; div. 2012) Stephanie Gazda (m. 2016)
- Children: 3
- Presenting career
- Show: Expedition Wild
- Network: National Geographic Channel, Nat Geo WILD, and syndication
- Show: America the Wild with Casey Anderson
- Network: Nat Geo WILD
- Country: U.S.A.
- Website: caseyanderson.tv

Casey Anderson is an American filmmaker, wildlife naturalist, and television presenter known for translating human relationships with the natural world and wild animals to various audiences. He has been a host and executive producer of the Nat Geo WILD channel television series, Expedition Wild and America the Wild with Casey Anderson, and for raising Brutus the Bear, a grizzly bear that he rescued and adopted as a newborn cub. Brutus and Anderson have appeared in many films, documentaries, television commercials, and live educational shows across the United States.

== Early life ==
Casey Anderson was born and raised in East Helena, Montana. He is a fifth-generation Montanan and was interested in animals from an early age. He attended Montana State University in Bozeman, Montana, in 1995 and studied wildlife biology.

After college, Anderson worked for the Montana Department of Fish, Wildlife and Parks as a wildlife rehabilitation technician, and for several privately owned wildlife parks as an animal keeper and trainer. In 2002, he adopted an orphaned grizzly bear cub, Brutus, from an overcrowded wildlife park named Yellowstone Bear World where the cub was destined to spend his life in the park; the bear lived in a sanctuary Anderson built just for him near Anderson's home, until February 2021 when he died at 19 years old.

== Career ==
=== Brutus the Bear and Montana Grizzly Encounter ===
Anderson is the founder of Montana Grizzly Encounter Rescue and Educational Sanctuary in Bozeman, Montana. Anderson founded the sanctuary in 2004 as a place to raise Brutus, rehabilitate grizzlies rescued from bad captivity situations, and aid in the study of grizzlies. Brutus lived at the sanctuary, along with several other grizzlies.

Anderson served as the handler for Brutus, who has appeared in a number of television commercials, documentaries, and films. Anderson wrote a book, The Story of Brutus: My Life With Brutus the Bear and the Grizzlies of North America (Pegasus Books, 2010), about his relationship with Brutus, the founding of the Montana Grizzly Encounter sanctuary, and his observations about life in the wild and the preservation of bears.

=== Television host and producer ===
Anderson has been involved in film and television production since the 1990s. He worked as an actor, crew member, animal wrangler, and/or consultant for several programs produced by syndication company Associated Television International (ATI), including leading two expeditions to Botswana's Okavango Delta for the ATI series Untamed!.

In 2006, Anderson starred along with his bear Brutus in "Expedition Grizzly," an episode of the documentary series Wild for National Geographic Channel. The episode, for which Anderson was also associate producer, focused on his relationship with Brutus and a year-long project they undertook to observe and understand the habits of wild grizzly bears living in Yellowstone National Park. He subsequently became the regular host and producer for the long-running wildlife documentary series Expedition Wild, which has covered many different animals including mountain lions, wolves, wolverines, and several species of bears. Some episodes have also focused on the wildlife of particular areas such as Yellowstone and the Grand Canyon. Originally airing on the National Geographic Channel and later on its sister station Nat Geo WILD, Expedition Wild has been widely syndicated, including on ABC as part of Litton's Weekend Adventure, on The CW, and online via Hulu.

In 2013, Anderson became the executive producer and host of a new Nat Geo WILD documentary series, America the Wild with Casey Anderson, which featured Anderson traveling across North America, focusing on the particular wildlife and ecosystems of different regions. Episodes of America the Wild have also aired in syndication under the Expedition Wild title.

In the spring of 2015, Casey established VisionHawk Films, a production company based in Bozeman, Mt. His company has produced three films with the Smithsonian Channel, "The Mountain Lion and Me", "Into the Puma Triangle", and "Growing Up Grizzly: a tale of two orphans". With VisionHawk Films Casey has been nominated for a Primetime Emmy in 2022 for Cinematography with Legends of Ice Mountain

Anderson was formerly an executive producer and host at Grizzly Creek Films, the production company that was responsible for creating the series Expedition Wild and America the Wild. As of July 2015, Anderson is currently an executive producer and part owner of VisionHawk Films, a new Montana-based film production company specializing in epic Natural World History filmmaking.

=== Other television work ===
Anderson frequently appears as himself on reality television shows, particularly those involving nature and animals. He was a featured survival expert on the Discovery Channel reality show Dude, You're Screwed, and guest starred (with his then-wife Missi Pyle) on a 2010 episode of Dog Whisperer with Cesar Millan on the Nat Geo Channel. He has been a recurring guest on talk shows including Late Night with Conan O'Brien, Conan, Fox & Friends, and Good Morning America, presenting a variety of animals including bears, baby coyotes, a wolf, a bobcat and a Eurasian eagle-owl.

In 2013, Anderson appeared on two episodes of the reality show Ke$ha: My Crazy Beautiful Life as "Casey", a "bear man" who was Kesha's possible new romantic interest. The second episode ended with the couple deciding not to pursue a relationship.

In 2018, Anderson appeared with Josh Gates on Gate's show "Expedition Unknown: Hunt for the Yeti". They traveled together via helicopter to the area in Butaan where Anderson had pictures of Yeti tracks. No actual Yeti was observed, however, a footprint was documented and other peripheral evidence was observed.

=== Feature films ===
Anderson and Brutus both made their feature film acting debuts in the independent film Iron Ridge (2008), a wilderness rescue drama filmed location in Montana using an all-Montana cast and crew and financed by Montanans. Anderson played a hunter from the city who travels, with a friend, deep into the backcountry of Montana, while Brutus played a bloodthirsty grizzly bear encountered by one of the hunters in the wild. Although Anderson played a supporting role, he and Brutus were prominently featured in the advertising for the film.

== Personal life ==
Anderson married Stephanie Gazda in August 2016. The couple live in Paradise Valley, Montana with their two daughters and son.

Anderson was previously married to actress Missi Pyle from 2008 to 2011. They met in 2007 during the making of the film Pretty Ugly People (2008), in which Pyle starred, Brutus had a small role, and Anderson worked as animal trainer. Brutus the Bear was best man at their wedding, which was held in September 2008 at Holland Lake Lodge in Montana where the couple met. In 2013, Pyle confirmed in an interview that the couple had broken up.

== Filmography ==
=== Film ===
Year	Title	Role	Notes
2008	Iron Ridge	Jake Munro	

=== Television ===
Year	Title	Episode	Episode Title	Role	Notes
2006	Wild	Season 1	"Expedition Grizzly"	Himself	With Brutus the Bear
2010–2014	Expedition Wild	Seasons 1-4	Multiple episodes	Himself (host)	Some episodes also feature Brutus the Bear
2010	Dog Whisperer with Cesar Millan	Season 7, episode 3	"Ellie and J.J. and Oscar" (alternate title: "Grizzly Dogs")	Himself (guest)	With Missi Pyle
2013-2015	America the Wild With Casey Anderson	Seasons 1-2	Multiple episodes	Himself (host)	
2013	Ke$ha: My Crazy Beautiful Life	Season 2, episode 7 Season 2, episode 8	"Bearman" "Meet the Fam"	Himself (as "Casey")	
2014-2015	Dude, You're Screwed	Season 2	Multiple episodes	Himself (cast member)	
2017	The Grand Tour	Series 2	Episode 3	Himself (Guest)	With Hugh Bonneville
2018	Monster Encounters	Season 1		Himself (Host)	
2018	The Mountain Lion and Me	Film	Tracking a mountain lion	Himself (Guest)	Smithsonian Channel
2020	Into the Puma Triangle	Film	A pride of pumas	Himself (Guest)	Smithsonian Channel
2022	Growing Up Grizzly - A Tale of Two Orphans	Film	Casey, Max & Pepper	Himself (Guest)	Paramount Plus & Smithsonian Channel
