= Live Free or Die (disambiguation) =

Live Free or Die is the state motto of the U.S. state of New Hampshire.

Live Free or Die may also refer to the following:

== Film ==
- Live Free or Die (2000 film), a 2000 documentary about abortion
- Live Free or Die (2006 film), a 2006 comedy movie
- Live Free or Die Hard, a 2007 action movie, the fourth in the Die Hard series

== Television ==
- "Live Free or Die" (Breaking Bad), an episode from the fifth season of Breaking Bad
- "Live Free or Die" (The Sopranos), an episode from the sixth season of The Sopranos
- Live Free or Die (TV series), a 2014 National Geographic Channel reality television series about people who live off the grid

== Literature ==
- Live Free or Die (1993 novel), a novel by New Hampshire writer Ernest Hebert
- Live Free or Die (2010 novel), a 2010 novel by science fiction writer John Ringo

== Music ==
Live Free or Die (1998), the third album by British rock band Balaam and the Angel
