= Daddy (dog) =

American Pit Bull Terrier

- Species: Canis familiaris
- Breed: American Pit Bull Terrier
- Sex: Male
- Born: 1993 or 1994
- Died: February 19, 2010 (aged 16)
- Owners: Redman; Cesar Millan
- Appearance: Cropped ears

External images
- Daddy, as puppy
- Daddy, Cesar Millan's pit bull terrier
- Cesar Millan with Daddy
- Daddy with his protégé Junior (Junior, here as a puppy)
- Daddy, with his protégé, Junior (Junior, here as an adult)

Daddy (c. 1994 ‒ February 19, 2010) was an American Pit Bull Terrier integral to dog trainer Cesar Millan's work and his television series, Dog Whisperer with Cesar Millan. Daddy became known for his calm temperament, tolerance for smaller dogs and capacity for empathy.

Millan employed Daddy's temperament to rehabilitate dogs, train dog owners and serve as a role model for a breed often associated with aggression. Daddy appeared frequently in episodes of the Dog Whisperer, with Millan referring to him as his right-hand man and The True Dog Whisperer. According to Millan, Daddy "never made a mistake — never, never. He's never displayed aggression or any other negative behavior. He's just always helped me." In 2009, Millan added "I have never had a dog like Daddy. I've been astounded by his intuition, consoled by his affection, and awed by his silent empathy."

Daddy had been with Millan since he was 4 months old, when his previous owner, rapper Redman, asked Millan to care for him. As a puppy he demonstrated a natural insecurity (from having been constantly on the move with Redman) and pronounced strength. By the time Daddy was ten years old — still with Millan, having been raised with a pack of Rottweilers and having survived both cancer and chemotherapy, he was officially adopted by the Millan family.

Millan later selected another pit bull puppy, Junior, as Daddy's protégé — to apprentice, learn his temperament and prepare to assume Daddy's role after his death. At the time of Daddy's death at age 16 on February 19, 2010, Millan noted, "he represented what my grandfather taught me, never work against Mother Nature." After the death of Daddy, Junior assumed Daddy's role and helped Millan with rehabilitating dogs by using calm, assertive energy. Junior died on July 21, 2021, at the age of 15. His death was announced by Millan, 7 days after the Pit Bull's death through his social media along with a tribute for Junior on his YouTube channel.

== See also ==
- List of individual dogs
