= Leader of the Pack (disambiguation) =

"Leader of the Pack" is a 1964 pop song recorded by The Shangri-Las, and it may also refer to:

== Music ==
- Leader of the Pack (album), the 1965 album containing the single
- Leader of the Pack (musical), based on life and music of Ellie Greenwich
- "Leader of the Pack", a track on the 2017 album The Thrill of It All by Sam Smith
- "Leader of the Pack", a single from the 2022 album Cub by Wunderhorse

== Television ==
- "Leader of the Pack" (2point4 Children), a 1991 episode
- "Leader of the Pack", episode of the animated series Gargoyles
- "Leader of the Pack" (Generator Rex), a 2010 episode
- "Leader of the Pack" (Highlander), a 1995 episode
- "Leader of the Pack" (Wolf Lake), a 2002 episode
- Cesar Millan's Leader of the Pack, documentary series

== See also ==
- Alpha (ethology)
