= The History of Sex =

- Genre: Documentary
- Written by: Kelly McPherson; Melissa Jo Peltier
- Directed by: Jim Milio; Shyam Benegal; Melissa Jo Peltier
- Narrated by: Peter Coyote
- Composer: Kevin Kiner
- Country of origin: United States
- Original languages: English, German
- No. of episodes: 5

Production
- Executive producers: Charlie Maday; Jim Milio; Melissa Jo Peltier
- Editors: Bruce Bailey; Diana Friedberg; Allison MacEwan
- Running time: 60 min each

Original release
- Network: History Channel
- Release: 17 September – 21 September 1999

The History of Sex is a 1999 five-part documentary series by Jim Milio, Kelly McPherson, and Melissa Jo Peltier; and narrated by Peter Coyote. It was first aired on the History Channel. It features interviews of Hugh Hefner, Dr. Ruth Westheimer, Helen Gurley Brown, and more.

== Episodes ==
The 20th Century
This episode first aired on 17 September 1999. It covers birth control methods, sexually transmitted diseases, sex studies, and Sildenafil.
From Don Juan to Queen Victoria
This episode first aired on 18 September 1999. It covers the sexual lives of Giacomo Casanova to the Marquis de Sade, the pilgrims and the Puritans; African tribal rites; and Victorian society.
The Middle Ages
This episode first aired on 19 September 1999. It covers sex from ancient Rome to the Renaissance.
The Eastern World
This episode first aired on 20 September 1999. It covers sexuality from Japan, India, China, and Arabia. It also discusses the origin of the Kama Sutra. There is an error in this program. It says, "The predominant religion in Baghdad was Islam, which was founded in 1622AD by the prophet Mohammed." Islam was actually founded in 622AD.

Ancient Civilization
This episode first aired on 21 September 1999. It covers sexuality from Mesopotamia, Rome, Egypt and Greece.
