= Iron Ridge (film) =

- Theatrical release poster
- Directed by: Stu Brumbaugh
- Screenplay by: Stu Brumbaugh
- Produced by: Stu Brumbaugh; Joanna Beeson; Randy Barrett; Brent Carleton; Cheryl Mittal; Rory Schulte
- Starring: Stu Brumbaugh; Randy Barrett; Casey Anderson
- Cinematography: Joanna Beeson; Stu Brumbaugh; Thomas Opre
- Edited by: Terry Tychon
- Production company: Yellow Wood Films
- Release date: March 28, 2008
- Running time: 85 mins.
- Country: United States
- Language: English
- Budget: $30,000

Iron Ridge is a 2008 American independent wilderness survival drama film written and directed by Stu Brumbaugh. It marked the feature film debut of naturalist and television host Casey Anderson and his bear Brutus. The film was "100% Montana-made", having been shot entirely on location in Montana with a cast and crew entirely from Montana, entirely financed by Montanans.

The film was released on Region 1 DVD in 2013 by Fenix Pictures.

== Plot ==
William Price (Stu Brumbaugh) and his friend Jake Munro (Casey Anderson) go together on a hunting trip into the backcountry of Montana. Price is a yuppie who lacks wilderness experience and is distracted by his marital problems. While Price and Munro are attempting to hunt deer, Price accidentally gets lost in the woods, becomes disoriented and is unable to find his way back to his cabin. He has no supplies other than his rifle, a book of matches, a pocket knife and the clothes he is wearing. Despite his lack of survival skills, he must find food, water, warmth and shelter, and defend himself against an aggressive grizzly bear (Brutus).

Meanwhile, Munro alerts the Montana Department of Fish, Wildlife and Parks search and rescue team, headed by veteran ranger Carl Martin (Randy Barrett). Martin and his rescue team work against the clock to find Price before a major snowstorm moves into the area. In the end, Price is saved and reunited with his wife, but Martin dies in the process.

== Cast ==
- Stu Brumbaugh as William Price
- Casey Anderson as Jake Munro
- Randy Barrett as Carl Martin
- Jadi Stuart as Jessica Price
- Dan Bertus as Jim Franklin
- Tianta Stevens as Mindy Franklin
- Jason Seibel as Dan Porter
- Darryl Brumbaugh as Sam
- Bill Galt as Bill
- Colt Walker as Iron Crow
- Brutus the Bear as Bear

== Production notes ==
Stu Brumbaugh was inspired to write Iron Ridge based on his own experience of getting lost with no supplies for 18 hours in the Bob Marshall Wilderness, where two grizzlies had recently eaten a horse. Before making the film, Brumbaugh had a lifelong phobia of bears, which he was able to overcome through working with Brutus.

The film was set in and shot on location in central and northwestern Montana, including Glacier National Park; the city of Great Falls; and the small town of Monarch, where the hunters' cabin (an actual 100-year-old cabin) used in the film is located. The film was shot on a budget of only $30,000, and over the span of a year because weather conditions made some locations inaccessible during the winter.

The "Price" home shown in the film is actually Russell Manor, located in Great Falls, which was the former home of Western artist Charles Marion Russell.

In addition to playing the role of "Jake Munro", Casey Anderson served as Brutus the Bear's trainer and Brumbaugh's stunt double for the bear scenes. Anderson and Brutus also attended the Great Falls premiere of the film and performed for the audience.

An actual Mercy Flights helicopter crew from Great Falls was featured in a rescue scene in the film. The film is dedicated to three Mercy Flights crew members who, in an incident unrelated to the film, died in a plane crash while flying to retrieve a patient from Bozeman, Montana.
