= Brutus (bear) =

Grizzly bear that became star of the National Geographic documentary Expedition Grizzly

Brutus, also called Brutus the Bear (January 17, 2002 – February 2, 2021), was a grizzly bear (Ursus arctos horribilis) who was adopted as a newborn cub by the naturalist Casey Anderson, star of the National Geographic documentary Expedition Grizzly.

== Life ==
Brutus was born in January 2002. He spent his first months in a six-foot square steel box that was his mother's cage at a captive bear facility. Brutus lived at Montana Grizzly Encounter Rescue and Educational Sanctuary.

Brutus appeared frequently on television with Casey Anderson, including regular appearances as Anderson's "co-host" on the Nat Geo/Nat Geo WILD series. He also appeared in two films, Iron Ridge (2008) and Pretty Ugly People (2008), as well as in commercials and in live educational shows across America.

Brutus died on February 2, 2021, at the age of 19.

== See also ==
- List of individual bears
