= Dude, You're Screwed =

American reality TV series

- Genre: Reality television
- Country of origin: United States
- Original language: English
- No. of seasons: 2
- No. of episodes: 15 (list of episodes)

Production
- Executive producers: Scott Feeley; Scottie Madden
- Cinematography: Daniel Dvorak; Jason Fierst
- Editors: David Miers; Dustin Schmitt
- Running time: 43 minutes
- Production company: Discovery Channel

Original release
- Release: December 8, 2013 – December 17, 2014

Dude, You're Screwed (also known as Survive That!) is an American reality survival show which premiered on the Discovery Channel on December 8, 2013.

== Premise ==
The show is a competition between survival experts who take turns dropping each other in dangerous areas of the world. For each episode the goal is to find civilization within 100 hours, using only the survival kit provided and whatever they can sneak in with them.

== Hosts ==
The series is hosted by survival experts who also take turns being the contestant. The hosts are;

- Casey Anderson - World class tracker and conservationist.
- Matt Graham - Primitive skills specialist. Master of the atlatl.
- John Hudson - Former helicopter pilot for the British Royal Air Force, John wrote the current SERE manual used by UK special forces.
- Tom Moore - Served 16 years as a pathfinder in the US Army. Survival instructor.
- Terry Schappert - United States Army National Guard Special Forces veteran.
- Chris Swanda - Backwoods survivalist, preparedness expert, survival consultant.
- Jake Zweig - Former US Navy Seal.

== Episodes ==
=== Season 1 ===
Episode number	Title	Location	Competitor	Air date
1	Volcano Nightmare	Iceland	Jake Zweig	December 8, 2013
2	Embrace the Suck	Gulf of Mexico	Terry Schappert	December 15, 2013
3	Green Hell	Braulio Carrillo national park, Costa Rica	Matt Graham	December 22, 2013
4	Conquering Alaska	Alaska	John Hudson	December 29, 2013
5	Dead Man Walking	Chile	Tom Moore	January 5, 2014
6	Arctic Disaster	Arctic Circle	Matt Graham	January 12, 2014
7	Deadly Inferno	Utah	John Hudson	January 19, 2014

=== Season 2 ===
Episode number	Title	Location	Competitor	Air date
1	Epic Fail	Namib Desert	Jake Zweig	October 29, 2014
2	African Ambush	Tanzania	Matt Graham	November 5, 2014
3	Mayan Sacrifice	Yucatán	John Hudson	November 12, 2014
4	Death Row	Bison Prison, Burwash, Ontario	Chris Swanda	November 19, 2014
5	The Hunger Game	Canadian Rockies	Casey Anderson	November 26, 2014
6	Pain in the Neck	Transylvania	Terry Schappert	December 3, 2014
7	Island of Death	Isla Zapatera	Jake Zweig	December 10, 2014
8	No-Sleep Nightmare	Norway	Tim Smith	December 17, 2014
