= Dual Survival =

Television series

- Genre: Reality show, Survival skills
- Starring: Dave Canterbury (Season 1–2); Cody Lundin (Season 1–4); Joseph Teti (Season 3–6); Matt Graham (Season 4–6); Grady Powell (Season 7–8); Bill McConnell (Season 7); Josh James (Season 8); Bo McGlone (Season 8); EJ Snyder (Season 9); Jeff Zausch (Season 9)
- Narrated by: Paul Christie
- Country of origin: United States
- Original language: English
- No. of seasons: 9
- No. of episodes: 84 (list of episodes)

Production
- Executive producers: Charlie Corwin, Brian Nashel, French Horwitz
- Camera setup: Multiple
- Running time: 45 minutes
- Production company: Original Media

Original release
- Network: Discovery Channel
- Release: June 11, 2010 – October 12, 2016

Dual Survival is a United States reality television series that aired on the Discovery Channel. The show featured a pair of survival experts in predetermined survival scenarios while in challenging environments.

For the first two seasons, the show featured the differing outdoor survival philosophies and skills of Cody Lundin, a naturalist and primitive-skills expert who runs the Aboriginal Living Skills School in Prescott, Arizona, and Dave Canterbury, a military-trained survival instructor who runs the Pathfinder Training School in Ohio. Beginning with the third season, Canterbury was replaced with Joseph "Joe" Teti, and in Season 4, Matt Graham replaced Lundin; Teti and Graham remained with the show through Season 6. Season 7 features Grady Powell, an ex-U.S. Army Green Beret, who replaced Joseph Teti, and Bill McConnell, a wilderness survivalist, who replaced Matt Graham. Season 8 Bill McConnell is replaced by Josh James for all but the last 2 episodes of the season where Josh James is replaced by Airforce veteran Bo Mcglone. In Season 9 both Grady and Bo are replaced by Naked and Afraid stars E.J. and Jeff.

== Episodes ==
Season	Episodes	Cast		Originally aired	
Season	Episodes	Cast		First aired	Last aired
1	10	Cody Lundin	Dave Canterbury	June 11, 2010	August 20, 2010
2	12	Cody Lundin	Dave Canterbury	April 22, 2011	July 1, 2011
3	11	Cody Lundin	Joseph Teti	January 1, 2013	March 13, 2013
4	10	Cody Lundin; Matt Graham	Joseph Teti	April 23, 2014	June 25, 2014
5	13	Matt Graham	Joseph Teti	January 21, 2015	April 22, 2015
6	4	Matt Graham	Joseph Teti	September 30, 2015	October 21, 2015
7	10	Bill McConnell	Grady Powell	January 13, 2016	March 15, 2016
8	7	Josh James; Bo McGlone	Grady Powell	June 15, 2016	August 3, 2016
9	7	Jeff Zausch	EJ Snyder	August 24, 2016	October 12, 2016

== Production ==
Season 1 and Season 2 of Dual Survival originally aired in 2010 and 2011, respectively.

Season 3 commenced production in 2012 and began airing on January 1, 2013.

Season 4 debuted on April 23, 2014, and Season 5 began airing on January 21, 2015.

Season 6 aired its first episode on September 30, 2015.

Season 7 aired its first episode on January 13, 2016.

Season 8 aired its first episode on June 15, 2016, featuring Grady Powell and new partner Joshua James. Joshua is from New Zealand and has a high profile in the survival world.

Season 9 aired its first episode on August 24, 2016, featuring new hosts Edwin John Snyder and Jeffrey Zausch.

== Format ==
In Dual Survival's first two seasons, each episode featured Lundin and Canterbury in a different survival scenario: marooned on a deserted island, lost in a foreboding jungle, stranded in an arid desert, etc. They had to survive for a number of days with minimal gear that pertained to the scenario. Along the way, Lundin and Canterbury demonstrated various survival skills such as using primitive methods to make fire, obtaining potable water, and hunting, foraging, or gathering food.

Conflict often arose from differences between the survivalists' philosophies and methods. For example, Canterbury often remarked on Lundin's choice to not wear shoes or long pants, regardless of the scenario's environment, such as glaciers.

In Season 3, Joseph Teti replaced Dave Canterbury, and in February 2014, prior to the start of Season 4, Cody Lundin announced via Facebook that he was fired by Discovery Channel owing to what he alleges were “differences over safety and health concerns.” Early in Season 4, Matt Graham replaced Cody Lundin as Teti's partner.

== International broadcasters ==
- The series premiered in Australia on April 7, 2015 on Discovery Channel.

== Spin off ==
A Brazilian version of Dual Survivor started filming in 2012 and was titled Dual Survival Brazil (pt). It was produced by Mixer and aired for two seasons. The survival experts on this show are Edmilson Leite, a colonel in the Brazilian Air Force, and Leonardo Rocha, who has lived with indigenous tribes and is a primitive skills specialist.

== DVD releases ==
DVD name	No. of episodes	Run time (minutes)	Release
Dual Survival Season 1	10	491	August 2, 2011
Dual Survival Season 2	10	516	August 13, 2013

== See also ==
- Robinsonade
