= Cesar Millan's Leader of the Pack =

- Genre: Documentary
- Starring: Cesar Millan
- Country of origin: United States
- No. of seasons: 1
- No. of episodes: 12

Production
- Executive producers: Gregory Vanger; Jenny Apostol
- Producers: Leo Lavazza; Marcela Campos
- Running time: 40 to 43 minutes (excluding commercials)
- Production company: POWWOW Media Partners

Original release
- Network: Nat Geo Wild
- Release: January 5 – March 26, 2013

Cesar Millan's Leader of the Pack is an American documentary television series on the Nat Geo Wild. The series premiered on January 5, 2013.

== Premise ==
The series follows Cesar Millan as he helps give shelter dogs new homes and takes place at Millan's newest Dog Psychology Center located in Miraflores, Spain. Candidate individuals and families compete against each other to demonstrate that they can offer each dog a matching and balanced home. One of the candidates wins the contest each episode and is given the dog.

== Episodes ==
Season	Episodes	Season Premiere	Season Finale
1	12	January 5, 2013	March 26, 2013

=== Season 1 (2012) ===
No.	Title	Original release date
1	"Jet Power"	January 5, 2013
2	"Love At First Bite"	January 12, 2013
3	"When Harry met Cesar"	January 19, 2013
4	"Miles To Go"	January 26, 2013
5	"A Friend for Amigo"	February 9, 2013
6	"Rosie's Thorn"	February 16, 2013
7	"Once Bitten"	February 19, 2013
8	"Mambo Madness"	February 26, 2013
9	"Dora's Dilemma"	March 5, 2013
10	"Too Much Mojo"	March 12, 2013
11	"Turbo Charged"	March 19, 2013
12	"Saving Sophia"	March 26, 2013
