= Cody Lundin =

American reality television survival show star

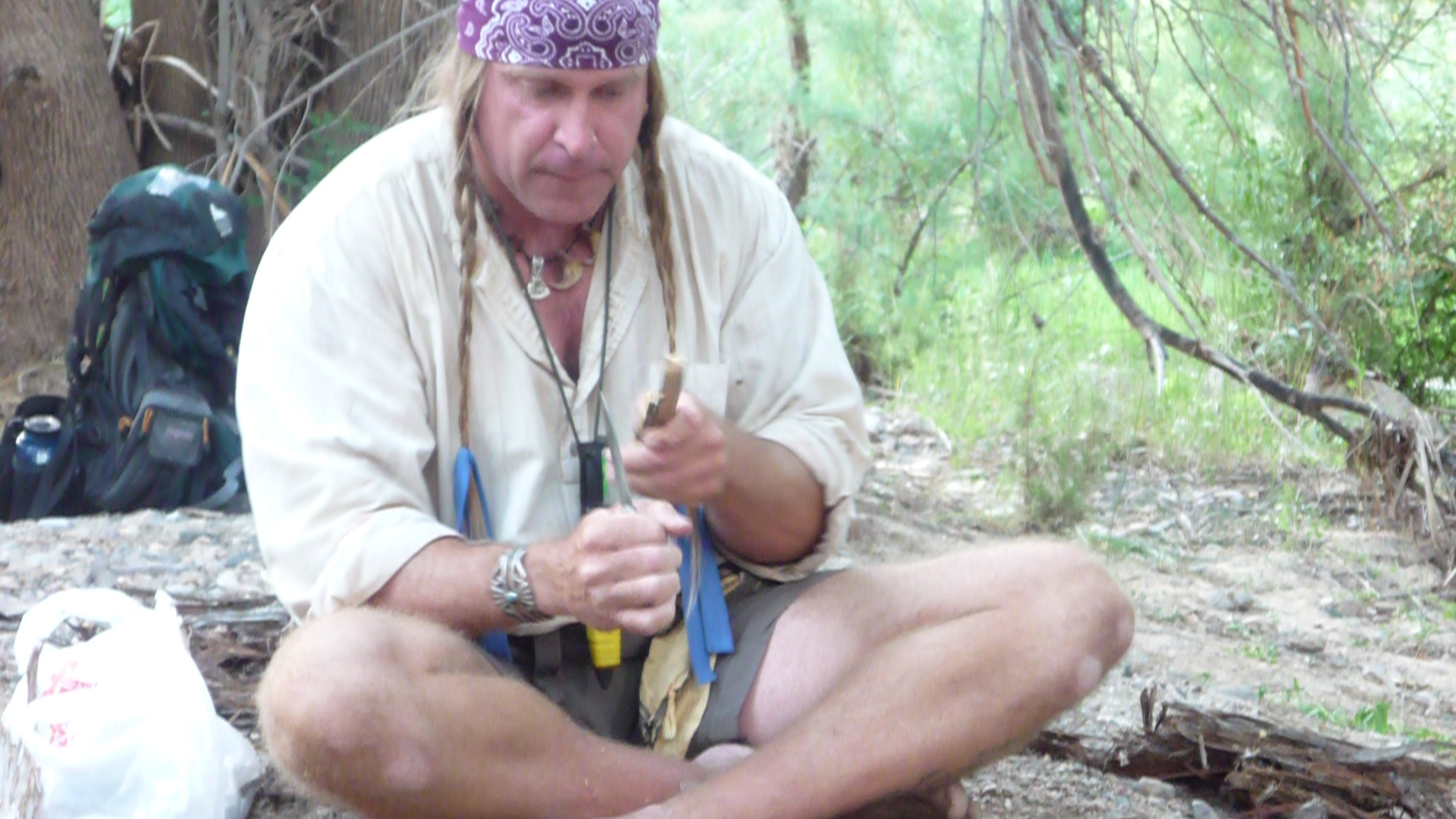
- Born: March 15, 1967 (age 59); Yavapai County, Arizona, US
- Occupations: Survival instructor, TV personality, motivational speaker
- Known for: Former co-host of Discovery Channel's Dual Survival

Cody Lundin (born March 15, 1967) is a survival instructor at the Aboriginal Living Skills School in Prescott, Arizona, which he founded in 1991. There he teaches modern wilderness survival skills, primitive living skills, urban preparedness, and homesteading. Lundin was also a former co-host of Discovery Channel's reality television series, Dual Survival.

Lundin is an only child whose father was in the military. He spent his early childhood moving around until finally settling in Laramie, Wyoming, where he attended junior high and high school. After graduating from high school he lived on the streets, in a commune, in the backyards of friends, and then in a brush shelter while he attended college in Prescott, Arizona. Lundin holds a B.A. in Depth Psychology and Holistic Health from Prescott College.

Lundin is the author of two books on survival and preparedness: 98.6 Degrees: The Art of Keeping Your Ass Alive and When All Hell Breaks Loose: Stuff You Need to Survive When Disaster Strikes. Lundin has also provided a foreword for Steve Hart's Citizen Survivor's Handbook, a parody of British wartime propaganda focusing on the importance of psychological endurance in times of crisis.

In 2004, Lundin hosted the Discovery Channel show, Lost in the Wild.

Lundin was a co-host of the television series Dual Survival from 2010 until 2014. On the show, Lundin demonstrated various survival skills while wearing shorts in all weather and going barefoot. On February 17, 2014, Lundin announced on his Facebook page and on his website that he had been fired from the series due to differences of opinion on matters of safety.

Lundin says that he lives off-the-grid in a self-designed, passive solar earth home in the high-desert wilderness of northern Arizona, collecting rainwater, composting waste, and paying nothing for utilities.

Lundin created, produced and hosted The Survival Show with Cody Lundin. Season one was launched in February 2024, and season two in March 2025. Part parody, part variety show, it is his rebuttal to corporate TV survival shows which often showcase inaccurate survival information.

Lundin launched his podcast, Cody Lundin's Keep Your Ass Alive, in January 2026 on the Cast11 network. His show covers all aspects of survival skills and self-reliance in his typical unfiltered style. The podcast interviews special guests, featured Down The Barrel one-on-one training with Cody, and Q and A with listeners.

== Bibliography ==
- Lundin, Cody (2003). 98.6 Degrees: The Art of Keeping Your Ass Alive. Gibbs Smith. ISBN 1586852345.
- Lundin, Cody (2007). When All Hell Breaks Loose: Stuff You Need To Survive When Disaster Strikes. Gibbs Smith. ISBN 978-1423601050.

== See also ==
- List of barefooters
- Dave Canterbury
