= Dave Canterbury =

American survival expert

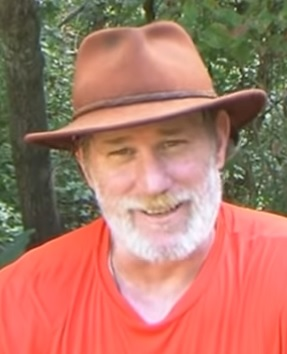
- Dave Canterbury in 2013
- Born: September 19, 1963 (age 63)
- Military career
- Allegiance: United States of America
- Branch: U.S. Army
- Service years: 1981–87
- Rank: Sergeant
- Units: 984th Military Police Company, 260th Military Police Company
- Other work: Survival Instructor, former television presenter
- Website: The Pathfinder School

David Michael Canterbury (born September 19, 1963) is a survival expert who co-starred on the reality television show Dual Survival for two seasons (2010–11) which aired on the Discovery Channel. He is also an author, publishing Bushcraft 101 in 2014 (which made The New York Times Best Seller list), Survivability for the Common Man (2011), and Advanced Bushcraft (2015). In 2015 Canterbury co-starred in a survival series called Dirty Rotten Survival, which aired on the National Geographic Channel.

== Early career ==
He first worked on a reptile farm, then as a commercial fisherman and diver in Florida.

== Teaching ==
Canterbury is currently the owner and one of the instructors at the Pathfinder School in southeast Ohio. Canterbury teaches survival techniques, promoting what he calls the "5 Cs of Survivability": a cutting tool, a combustion device, cover, a container, and cordage. He has a YouTube TV channel on which he posts survival-themed instructional videos.

== Broadcasting ==
On the show Dual Survival, Canterbury demonstrated various survival skills, such as how to cauterize an injury using gunpowder and fire. He intentionally sliced open his own arm and then had his co-host, Cody Lundin, use this technique to stop the bleeding. In 2012 the producers decided Canterbury would not be returning to the show when it was found that he lied about his military record.

== Bibliography ==
- Canterbury, Dave (2010). Survivability for the Common Man. The Pathfinder School LLC. ISBN 978-0983954507.
- Canterbury, Dave (2014). Bushcraft 101. Adams Media. ISBN 9781440579776.
