= Dog Whisperer with Cesar Millan =

American reality television series

- Starring: Cesar Millan
- Country of origin: United States
- Original language: English
- No. of seasons: 9
- No. of episodes: 176

Production
- Running time: 60 minutes
- Production companies: MPH Entertainment, Inc. Dog Whisperer Productions, LLC.

Original release
- Network: National Geographic (2004–2011); Nat Geo Wild (2011–2012)
- Release: September 13, 2004 – September 15, 2012

Related
- Dog Whisperer: Family Edition

Dog Whisperer with Cesar Millan is an American reality television series that featured dog trainer Cesar Millan's work with problem dogs. The series ran for nine seasons, from September 13, 2004, to September 15, 2012.

Episodes of Dog Whisperer with Cesar Millan featured guests' problem dogs, introduced through documentary-style footage, and an interview with the owners. Millan offered suggestions on how the owners could become their pet's "pack leader," consistent with the theory that dogs are pack animals. He used behavior modification techniques and the philosophy that exercise, discipline, and affection are required "in that order" for dogs to be healthy and balanced.

The series premiered on September 13, 2004, on the National Geographic Channel in half-hour episodes. In 2005, it was expanded to one hour and moved to prime time. In 2011, the series aired its seventh season broadcast in more than eighty countries worldwide. Produced by Sheila Emery and Kay Sumner in association with MPH Entertainment, Inc., the program had an estimated audience of 11 million American viewers per week. A number of entertainment-industry professionals have appeared on the program, including Virginia Madsen and Jada Pinkett Smith.

On June 5, 2014, Litton Entertainment announced a family-oriented revival/spinoff of the show, Dog Whisperer: Family Edition, which aired on The CW Saturday mornings as part of Litton's One Magnificent Morning block. It began on October 4, 2014, and aired for three seasons, ending in May 2017.

In 2019, all rights to the series were formally transferred to Dog Whisperer Productions. The library of over 160 episodes is jointly owned by Kay Sumner, Sheila Emery, and Melissa Jo Peltier. David Segura joined the executive team following the departure of Emery. Dog Whisperer Productions is the sole owner and operator of the series and manages all distribution and licensing of the library.

Until 2022, international distribution was handled by Rive Gauche Television. Following Rive Gauche's bankruptcy filing on December 19, 2022, Dog Whisperer Productions began managing the library directly. The company now partners with Cineverse for digital and streaming distribution across the U.S., Canada, and select global territories.

== Program format ==
The Dog Whisperer with Cesar Millan is a documentary-style reality television program centering on animal behaviorist Cesar Millan as he works to rehabilitate dogs with behavior problems ranging from excessive barking to behaviors that could leave the owners little choice but to medicate or euthanize their dogs if not corrected.

Millan said in a number of interviews that the program is not a guide to training, but a demonstration of his rehabilitation techniques. Each episode begins with the statement, "Do not attempt the techniques you are about to see without consulting a professional" and repeats warnings that viewers should not attempt the behavior-modification techniques at home.

Viewers are introduced to the difficult dogs and their owners through home-movie style footage of their dogs engaging in the behavior its owners find problematic. A voice-over describes the situation briefly, the owners tell their story, and Millan arrives. Program publicity states that Millan does not review the "audition" videos of the dogs and has no advance knowledge of the situation unless the dog's behavior makes it a potential danger to Millan and the crew. Millan conducts an interview as the owners describe the issues at hand. Millan then usually offers suggestions on how the owners may alter their own habits to become a "pack leader" for their pet. He goes on to demonstrate behavior modification techniques with the dog and shows his expertise at establishing dominance over the troubled canine. Millan frequently brings one or more of his own dogs to a training session, which Millan describes as transferring another dog's "balanced energy". Sometimes, the dog is taken to his Dog Psychology Center where it stays with Millan's own dogs for days or weeks. Each episode ends with a demonstration of the dog's altered behavior and the amazement of the owner.

Episodes feature the owners and families whose dogs are being rehabilitated. In inviting submissions, the producers looked for a wide variety of dog problems, including unusual phobias, obsessions, fearful behavior, aggression, or other unique situations that Cesar could help transform. Producers asked owners for anything interesting or funny about their dog and requested a short video showing three instances of the problem behavior. Occasionally the program called for particular types of dogs for themed episodes, such as "spoiled rotten" dogs for Beverly Hills Divas.

On occasion, Dog Whisperer was taken "on the road" with episodes recorded in U.S. cities other than Los Angeles, and from the United Kingdom, Canada, and Australia.

== History ==
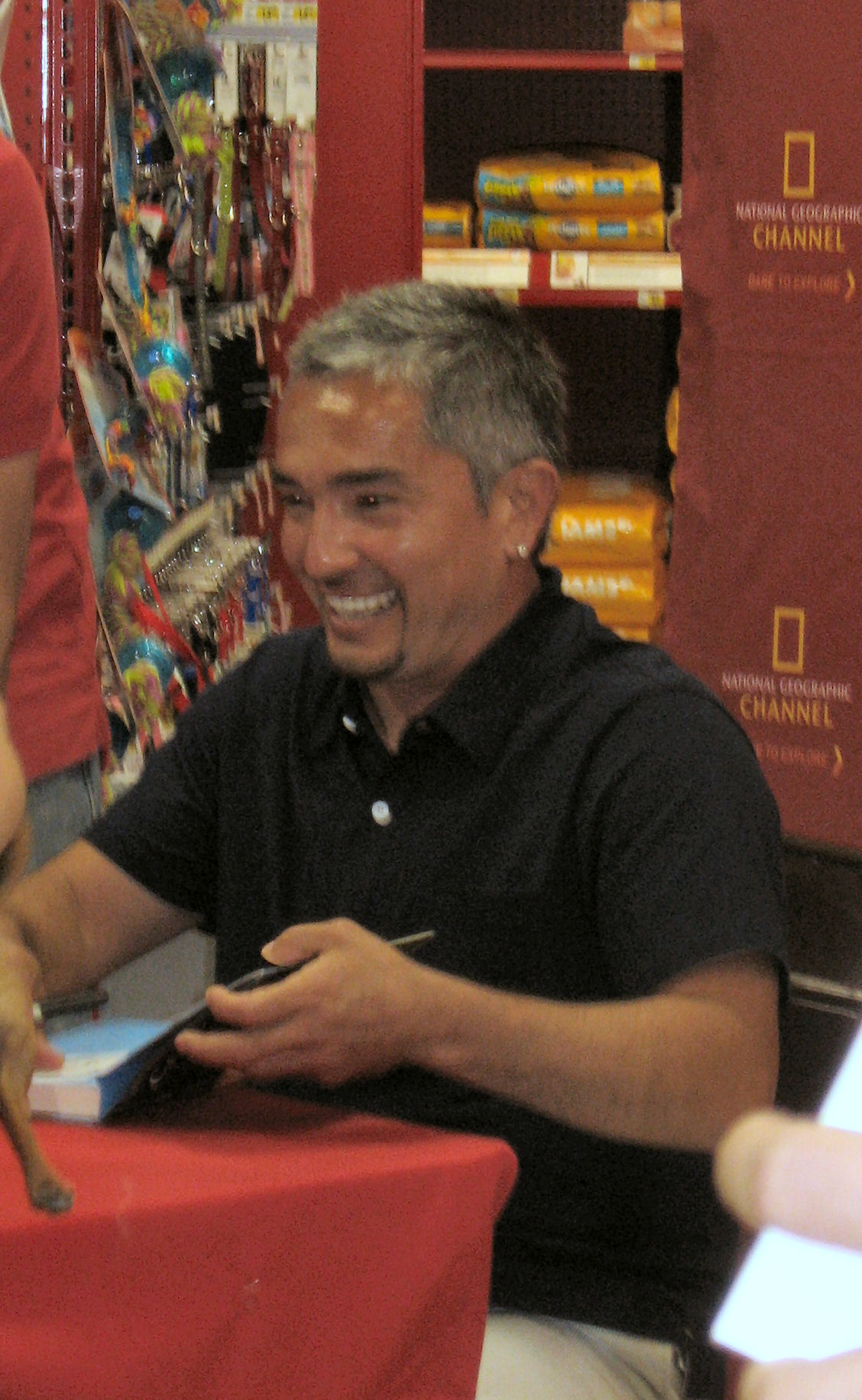
Millan signing books in 2007

The Dog Whisperer chronicles the work of Cesar Millan, a Mexican American, who runs a rehabilitation facility dedicated to treating dogs with behavioral issues. Millan spent his childhood in the city of Culiacán in the state of Sinaloa, Mexico. However, his favorite place was his grandfather's ranch where he was captivated by the wild dogs on the property. He spent so much time with the dogs that locals called him el perrero, meaning "the dog boy". His fascination with dogs extended to television, and his favorite programs featured highly trained dogs such as Lassie.

By his teens, Millan had decided that he wanted to be a Hollywood animal trainer, and he moved to Los Angeles, where he worked for a dog grooming store and then for a limousine company. He ran a dog-training business from a van before opening the iconic Dog Psychology Center in South Los Angeles, where he focused on rehabilitating especially aggressive dogs. His expertise with dogs was publicized primarily by word of mouth, and Millan soon developed a clientele that included entertainment-industry professionals. Millan's first mention in the national mainstream media came in People magazine in December 2002 in an article describing his work with action-film director Ridley Scott's Jack Russell Terriers.

Millan is a self-taught dog trainer who established a reputation for working with aggressive breeds and hard-to-handle cases at a San Diego dog groomers, subsequently developing a celebrity clientele.

In 2002, after he was profiled in a newspaper article, Millan received offers from a number of producers and chose to work with Sheila Emery and Kay Sumner. They teamed with MPH Entertainment, Inc., which had been involved in successful reality-based cable shows, to produce a pilot. The producers had preliminary talks with Animal Planet, but the network would not commit beyond a single pilot episode. The National Geographic Channel expressed interest in the program, ordering 26 half-hour episodes on the proviso that MPH provide the required deficit financing. Under this agreement MPH and Emery/Sumner retained the copyright to the show. The channel retains control of television distribution in the United States and Canada. MPH and Emery/Sumner control worldwide home video and foreign sales and share that revenue with the channel, allowing them to create and market various video collections. The name of the program was similar to Paul Owens's 1999 book The Dog Whisperer. Owens, a reward-based trainer, has distanced himself from the program and now calls himself "the original dog whisperer".

The show premiered in 2004, gradually gaining audience attention by word of mouth. For the first season, the series wasn't positioned in prime time, and the channel did little to promote the show. However, in Season 2 it was expanded to an hour and moved to a prime time slot. In 2009 the National Geographic Channel agreed with Fox to syndicate the series in the fall of 2010, bringing it to a channel with exposure to approximately 50 million of the US's 120 million households. A journalist for The Times questioned Cesar Millan on his motivation for producing the program, and quoted him as responding, "The goal that God and I have together is the whole world transformed through a dog."

In 2006, former publicist Makeda Smith filed a copyright infringement suit which stated that, in 2001, she and her partner branded Millan as "The Dog Whisperer" by conceiving, producing, and directing what they say was a pilot named "The Dog Whisperer", featuring Tichina Arnold. The $5,000,000 lawsuit was settled out of court.

During the program's fourth season, the show celebrated its centennial episode. The program is broadcast in more than eighty countries worldwide, where it is alternatively known as Dog Whisperer with Cesar Millan, Dog Whisperer, or The Dog Whisperer. At the debut of the sixth season of the Dog Whisperer, a New York Times article estimated an audience of 11 million American viewers each week. In 2011, following the start of its seventh season, all repeats and future episodes were moved to Nat Geo Wild. The ninth and final season of Dog Whisperer began airing in July 2012, with Millan going on to star in the 12-part series Leader of the Pack in 2013.

The following year, Millan's new series Cesar 911 debuted on Nat Geo Wild, airing four seasons between March 2014 and September 2016. While not a direct continuation of The Dog Whisperer, it focuses on his continuing work with troubled dogs.

== Daddy ==
Daddy was an American Pit Bull Terrier integral to Millan's work and the show. Daddy was originally owned by rapper Redman. Daddy became known for his calm temperament, tolerance for smaller dogs, and capacity for empathy. Millan employed Daddy's temperament to rehabilitate dogs, train dog owners, and serve as a role model for a breed often associated with aggressiveness. Daddy appeared frequently in episodes of the Dog Whisperer, with Millan referring to him as his right-hand man. According to Millan, Daddy "never made a mistake—never, never. He's never displayed aggression or any other negative behavior. He's just always helped me." In 2009, Millan added "I have never had a dog like Daddy. I've been astounded by his intuition, consoled by his affection, and awed by his silent empathy."

== Celebrity appearances ==
Jada Pinkett Smith, who helped Millan achieve his goal of having a television show, participated in the program's 100th episode along with other celebrity guests including Patti LaBelle, Virginia Madsen, Ed McMahon and Daisy Fuentes—all having worked with Millan on earlier episodes with their dogs.

Celebrity Appearances
Bob Weide	Jake	Season 1, Episode 14	Jake and King
Jackie Zeman	Goldie	Season 1, Episode 20	Pepsi and Goldie
Daisy Fuentes	Alfie.	Season 1, Episode 26	Boyfriend and Alfie
Denise Richards	Betty, Lucy and Hank	Season 2, Episode 8	Wild Things
Phil Jackson and Jeanie Buss	Princess	Season 2, Episode 11	LA Laker Meltdown
Downtown Julie Brown	Candy	Season 3, Episode 14	Bad Candy
Mike White	Tootsie and Ginger	Season 4, Episode 3	Kiko, Tootsie & Ginger, and Binkey
Kathy Griffin	Chance and Pom-Pom	Season 4, Episode 27	My Life on the Dog List
Jada Pinkett Smith, Patti LaBelle, Virginia Madsen, Ed McMahon and Daisy Fuentes.	100 rehabilitated dogs	Season 4, Episode 32	100th Episode Celebration
Jillian Michaels	Seven	Season 6, Episode 5	Hairy Houdini
Howie Mandel	His wife's dog	Season 7, Episode 1	Mandel's Big Deal
Missi Pyle and Casey Anderson.	Ellie & J.J.	Season 7, Episode 3	Ellie & J.J. and Oscar
Rhona Mitra	Oscar	Season 7, Episode 5	Honeymoon Hell
Harriet Thorpe and Matilda Thorpe	Diesel & Bruno	Season 9, Episode 2	London Calling!
Hugh Hefner	Willa & Charlie	Season 9, Episode 7	Playboy Playmates
Kelsey Grammer	George & Elvis	Season 9, Episode 11	Hollywood Hounds

== Production crew ==
The writers of Dog Whisperer, Jim Milio and Melissa Jo Peltier, write that they put on their "writer-producer hats to focus, restructure, and help create a theme for the segment". This is followed by the "shaping of the show itself", writing the narrations, wraps, teasers, tags, and bumpers. They went on to say that "this is all for a show where absolutely nothing in the field (save Cesar's arrivals to the dog owner's front doors) is fabricated... what we like to call the last "real" reality show on television."

Executive producers for MPH Entertainment are Jim Milio, Melissa Jo Peltier, and Mark Hufnail. Sheila Possner-Emery and Kay Bachman-Sumner are producers. For National Geographic Channel, the executive producer is Char Serwa. Nicholas Bunker is associate producer, Christina Lublin coordinating producer and SueAnn Fincke series producer. The series is directed by SueAnn Fincke and Jim Milio. Cinematographers are Bryan Duggan and Christopher Komives. Thirty-six other crew members are involved in location management, sound recording, camera operation, music, editing, and production assistance.

== Reception ==
=== Critical reception ===
Common Sense Media gave the series a mostly positive review, calling it "a pleasure to watch."

=== Reception by the animal behavior community ===
In February 2006, an article in the New York Times quoted Dr. Nicholas Dodman, director of the Animal Behavior Clinic at Tufts University's Cummings School of Veterinary Medicine, said that his college had "written to National Geographic Channel and told them they have put dog training back 20 years". A New York Times August 2006 op-ed by Mark Derr, an author noted for his publications on dogs, criticized Dog Whisperer for its reliance on a "simplistic view of the dog's social structure". According to Derr, Millan's methodology "flies in the face of what professional animal behaviorists—either trained and certified veterinarians or ethologists—have learned about normal and abnormal behavior in dogs". Millan's theory of dominance in domestic dogs has been described as flawed.

Also in 2006, the American Humane Association (AHA) requested that the National Geographic Channel stop airing the program, saying that training tactics shown on Dog Whisperer were inhumane, outdated and improper. By November 2009, Millan had invited the American Humane Association to the set of Dog Whisperer, at which time, according to Millan, "they changed their state of mind about what is cruel". The association announced in February 2010 that despite "sharp differences of view in the past" and some lingering areas of disagreement, they shared many areas of interest with Millan.

Debra Horwitz, president of the American College of Veterinary Behaviorists, said the major benefits of The Dog Whisperer are that it makes owners aware that they are not alone in the problems they have with their pets, and that it provides good advice on the need for dogs to exercise and have rules. Horwitz added the show also has the major drawback of attributing behavior problems to dominance when the dog may be misbehaving because it is fearful or anxious. Pet columnist Steve Dale said in a July 2010 newspaper column that while he believed Millan was "blessed with an amazingly intuitive understanding of dog behavior", some of the methods shown on the program, particularly those related to dominance, were inappropriate and not substantiated by science.

The Humane Society of the United States Genesis Award Committee presented Milan with a 2008 Special Commendation for his work in rehabilitating animals.

Dr. Sophia Yin, a veterinarian, researcher and animal behaviorist, wrote articles and spoke about Cesar Millan's television show and methods, calling Cesar Millan's methods "based on the erroneous understanding of dominance and the need to use force or coercions [sic] as the first-line of training for all problems". She did, however, point out in the same sentence that "there are some good recommendations and lessons one can learn from it and other shows", and went on to list them.

In some countries in Europe, the TV show has a warning label text before it starts, for example in Sweden the warning before the show reads: "Note that several methods or techniques in this show could count as illegal animal abuse violations in Swedish law, check the laws carefully before using anything shown in this program", and Sweden has had national debates over Millan's techniques and whether they should be shown or not.

=== Ratings ===
Dog Whisperer premiered in 2004 as a half-hour program but subsequently became first in the National Geographic channel ratings and was expanded to a prime-time, one hour format. In 2007, the network renewed its most popular series to that date with an unprecedented 35 episodes in which Millan travelled the show to U.S. cities like New York City and Miami. In 2008, the show in its 100th episode had grown from an estimated 100,000 households per episodes per household to an estimated 1,000,000 people per episode. By 2010 Dog Whisperer had been National Geographic's top-rated series for six years.

== Awards ==
In 2005 and again in 2007, Millan was awarded the Michael Landon Award for Inspiration to Youth Through Television. The show received Emmy nominations for Outstanding Reality Program in both 2006 and 2007, though it did not take the award on either occasion.

In 2008, Dog Whisperer won TV Best Variety or Reality Show at the 23rd Annual Imagen Foundation Awards, and also won the People's Choice Award for Favorite Animal Show that same year. Dog Whisperer again won the People's Choice Awards in the category of Favorite Animal Show in 2010.

In 2010, the show was nominated for the Directors Guild of America Award for Outstanding Directorial Achievement in Reality Programs but did not take the awards.

== Legal issues ==
Millan's pit bull, Junior, allegedly killed Queen Latifah's dog and attacked gymnast Lidia Matiss. In 2017 Matiss was named as the plaintiff in a lawsuit against Millan. In response to the lawsuit, Millan claimed Matiss had assumed the risk of being attacked because she knew the dog was dangerous and claimed that Matiss was "negligent," though Millan did not specify how.

== See also ==
- It's Me or the Dog
