= Yellowstone Bear World =

Drive-thru wildlife park in Idaho, US

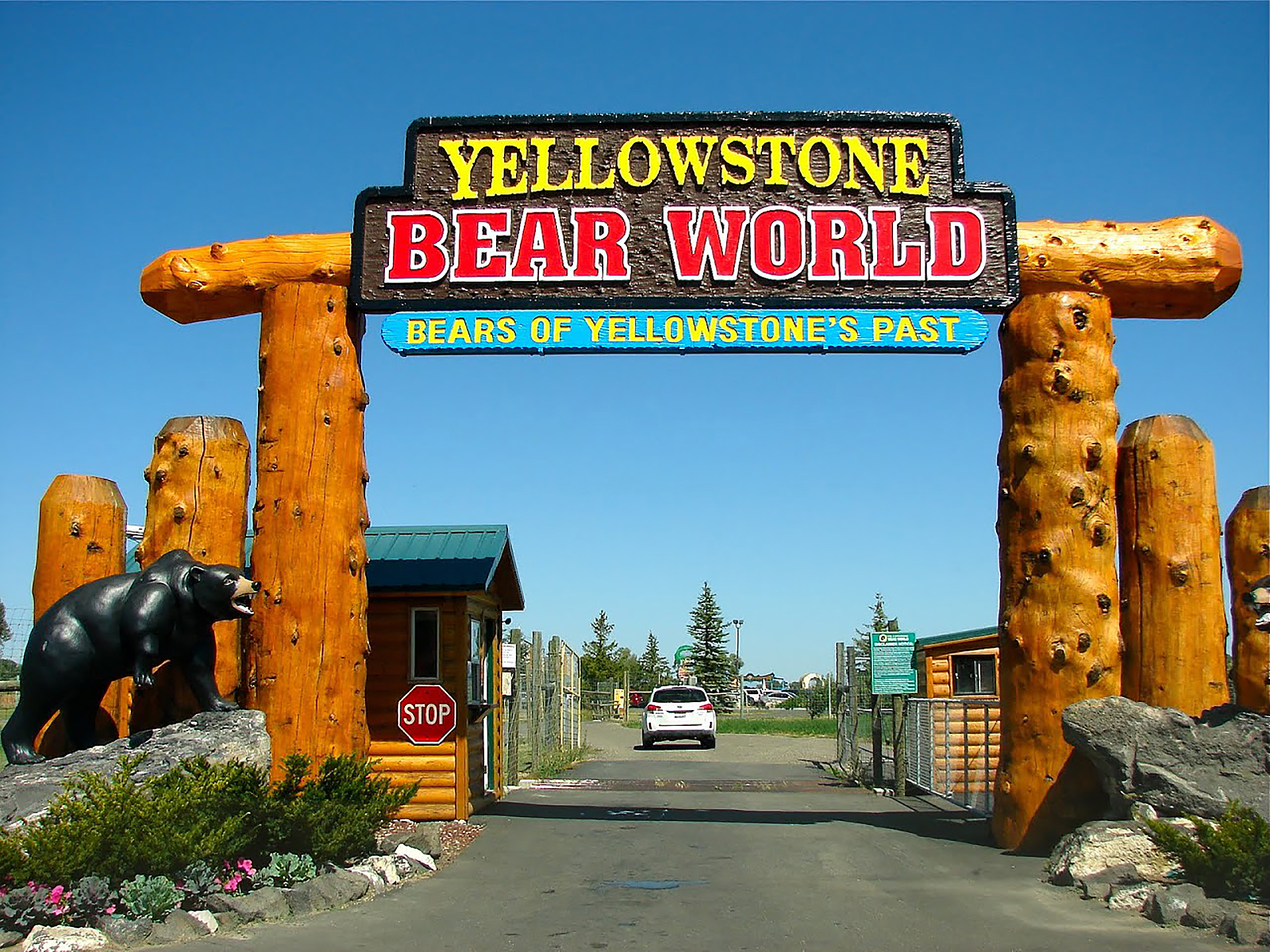
- Entrance to Yellowstone Bear World
- Interactive map of Yellowstone Bear World
- 43°44′20″N 111°51′57″W
- Date opened: 1998
- Location: Rexburg, Idaho, U.S.A.
- Land area: 125 acres (51 ha)
- No. of animals: Over 40 Black Bears and 5 Grizzly Bears
- No. of species: 8 Species of Wildlife: Grizzly Bear, American Black Bear, Mountain Goat, Rocky Mountain Elk, Bison, Moose, Mule Deer, and White-tail Deer
- Major exhibits: Drive-Thru, Bottle Feeding Bear Cubs, Wildlife Excursion, Three Bears Gift Shop, Amusement Rides, and Petting Zoo
- Website: yellowstonebearworld.com

Yellowstone Bear World is a privately owned drive-thru wildlife park. It is located in Rexburg, Idaho, 80 miles from Yellowstone National Park. It was established in 1998.

The park holds over 8 species of wildlife indigenous to the Greater Yellowstone Ecosystem. Other attractions in the park include a small amusement park and a petting zoo.

== History ==
=== Construction Delays ===
During construction of the park, developer Mike Ferguson halted excavations after the Army Corps of Engineers told him they wanted him to stop due to controversy and the lack of a required permit for building in the Snake River wetland. Work was halted in late April-early May 1998, but by that point most of the work for the park was already completed. According to the terms of the Clean Water Act, developers are required to show that they will do no or little damage to wetlands before work is begun. There is no evidence that Ferguson knew that he needed such permits in advance of beginning development.

On May 28, 1998, Madison County Commissioners voted to grant Mike Ferguson a permit to allow construction on the wetlands where the park was to be located. The vote was unanimous after local residents showed strong support for the project. This was the last step the park needed from county government officials for construction to be completed.

On June 12, 1998, the first of Bear World's bears arrived, two days after Ferguson reached an agreement with Idaho wildlife officials who gave him permission to bring in the bears on a temporary basis. This move allowed Ferguson an opening to temporarily avoid a ban on the commercial importation of black bears.

=== Direct Highway Access Closure ===
In 2016, the Idaho Department of Transportation started construction on the Thornton Interchange on Highway 20. When the interchange was completed in early 2017, it closed off the direct access to Yellowstone Bear World from Highway 20. Visitors had to follow signs, taking a less convenient route through backroads. According to Courtney Ferguson (general manager of Bear World) this resulted in a 10% drop in business.

A frontage road was later constructed to the west of Highway 20 to reinstate direct access. The road opened on May 30, 2019.

== Attractions ==
=== Drive-Thru ===
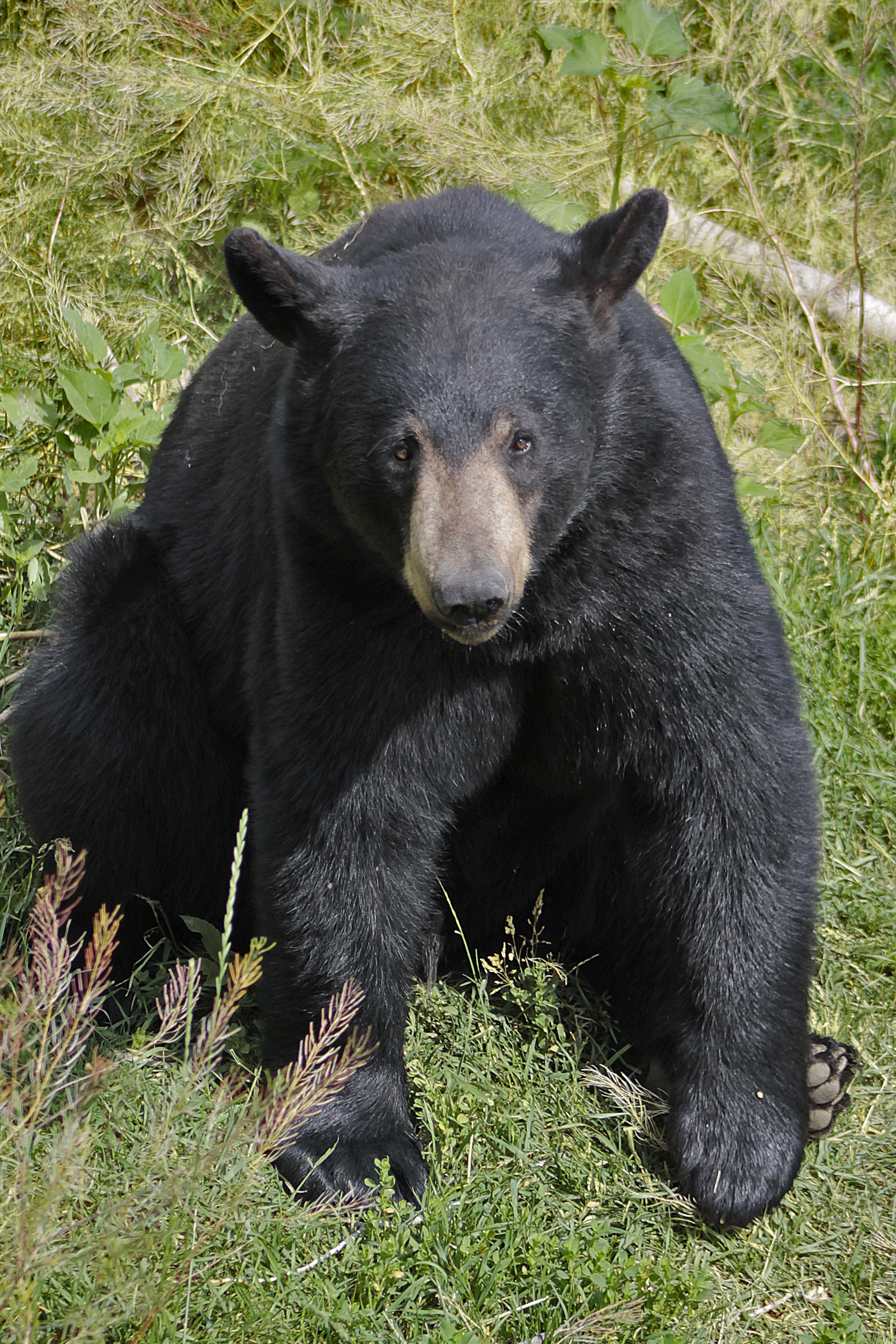
An American Black Bear at the park

Yellowstone Bear World is the only drive-through wildlife reserve in the Greater Yellowstone area. The major cause of attraction of the park is the opportunity for visitors to see grizzly bears, black bears, and other wildlife indigenous to North America in their native habitat and from the safety and comfort of their cars.

=== Bottle Feeding Bear Cubs ===
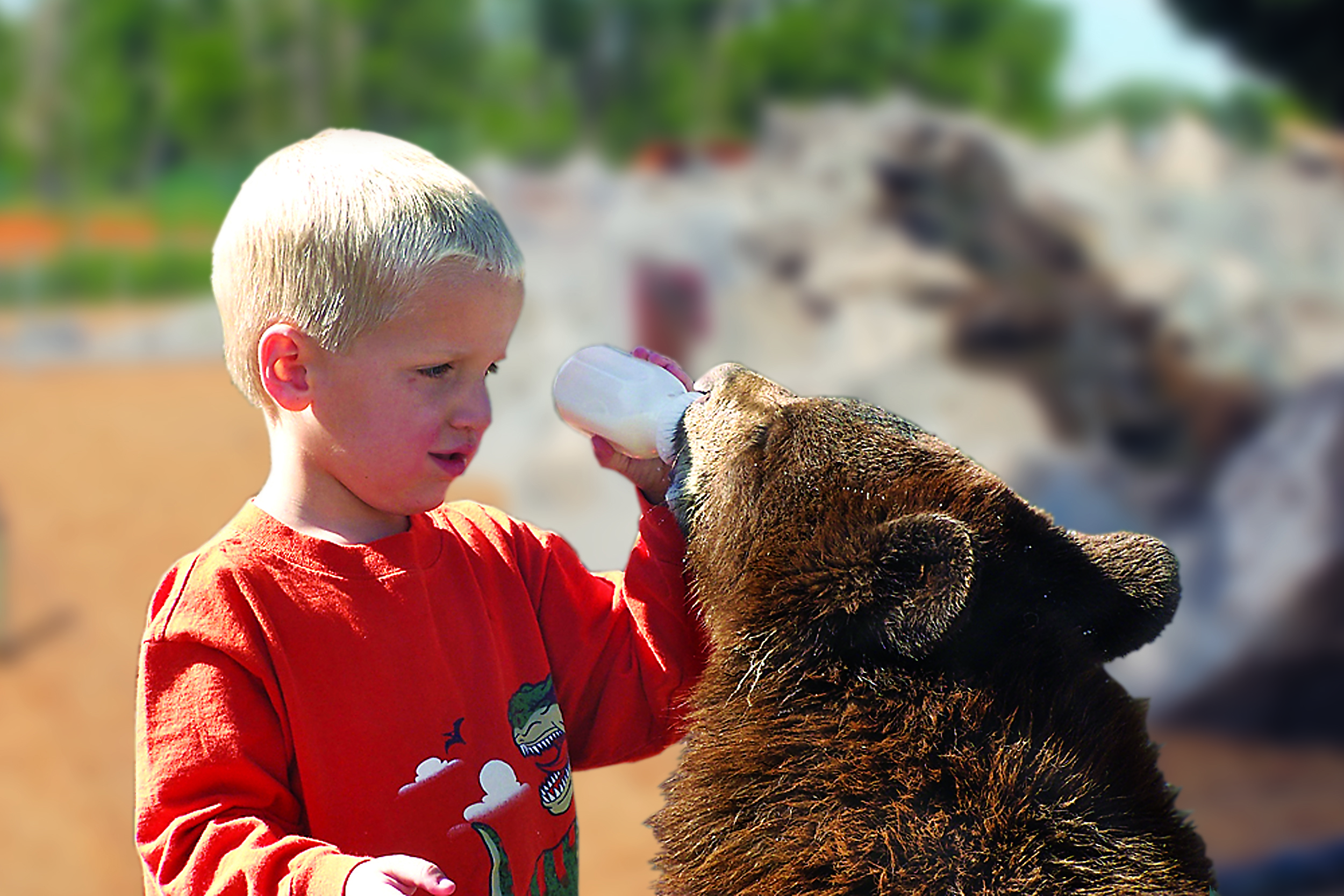
Bottle feeding a bear cub

Three times during each day the park offers children and adults the chance to bottle feed bear cubs and pet them. The feeding experience is part of a complete 'behind the scenes' visit with a professional animal keeper.

=== Wildlife Excursion ===
The Wildlife Excursion is an attraction that is in addition to the admissions. An animal keeper takes adults and children on a large truck to feed and explain interesting facts about Rocky Mountain Elk, American bison, Black Bears, and Grizzly Bears. Many guests choose this attraction to get photos of wildlife. It is the only way a guest can feed the adult bears at Yellowstone Bear World.

=== Petting Zoo ===
Visitors are encouraged to leave their cars and visit the petting zoo which consists of over one acre containing free-roaming farm animals and birds. There are also deer fawn or elk calf feedings at times.

=== Amusement Rides ===
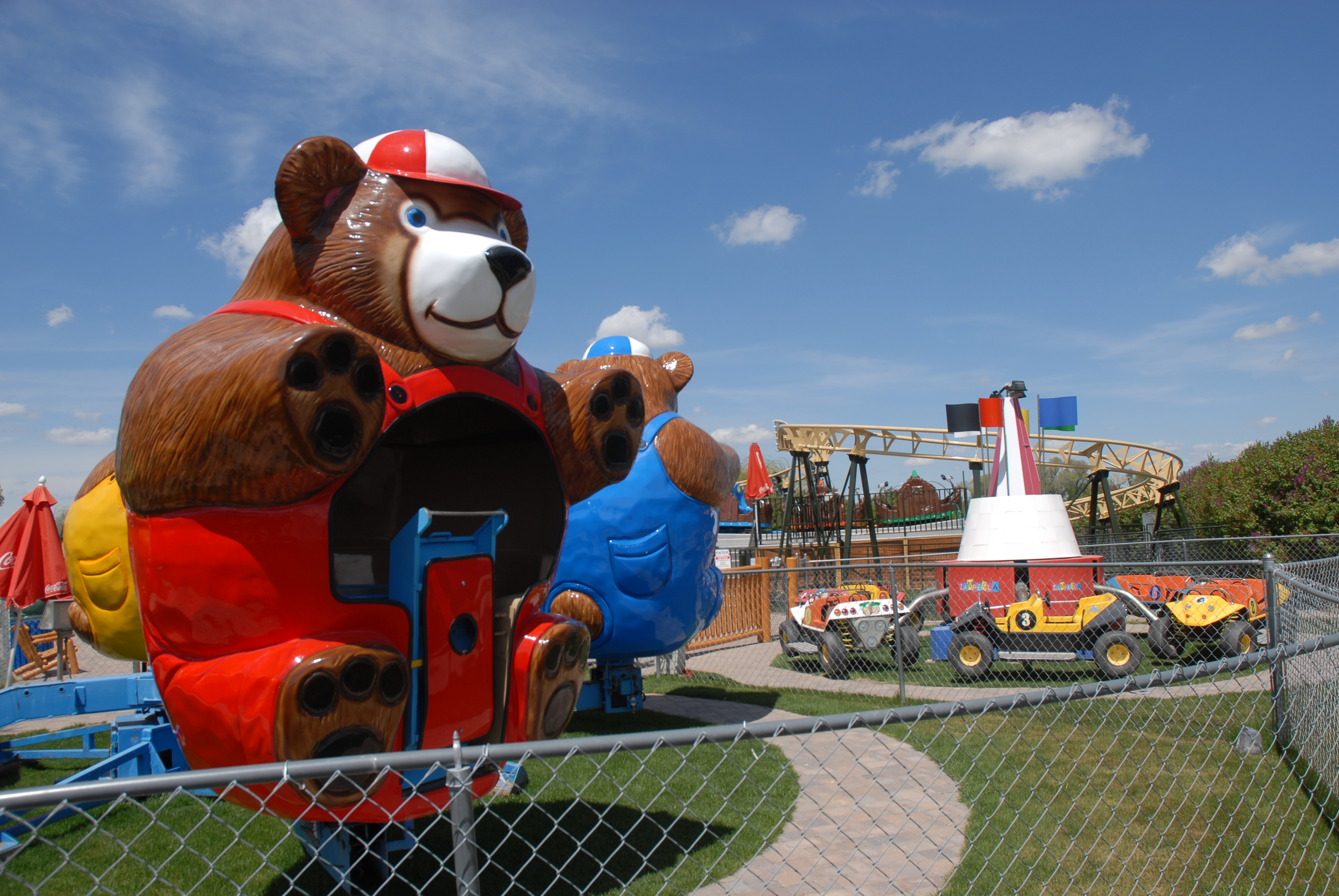
Amusement rides at the park

Yellowstone Bear World also has a small amusement park. The rides are designed for children ages three and up, but can be enjoyed by adults as well. Like the petting zoo, the rides are included with admission. Children under 36” must be accompanied by an adult.

List of Amusement Rides:

- Bair Affair
- Baja Buggy
- Circus Train
- Huckleberry Bounce
- Log Roller Coaster

=== Jurassic Creek ===
In 2023, Yellowstone Bear World opened up a dinosaur park called "Jurassic Creek". The park features Animatronics of various dinosaurs and is included with admission at no extra fee.
