= Melissa Jo Peltier =

American film producer

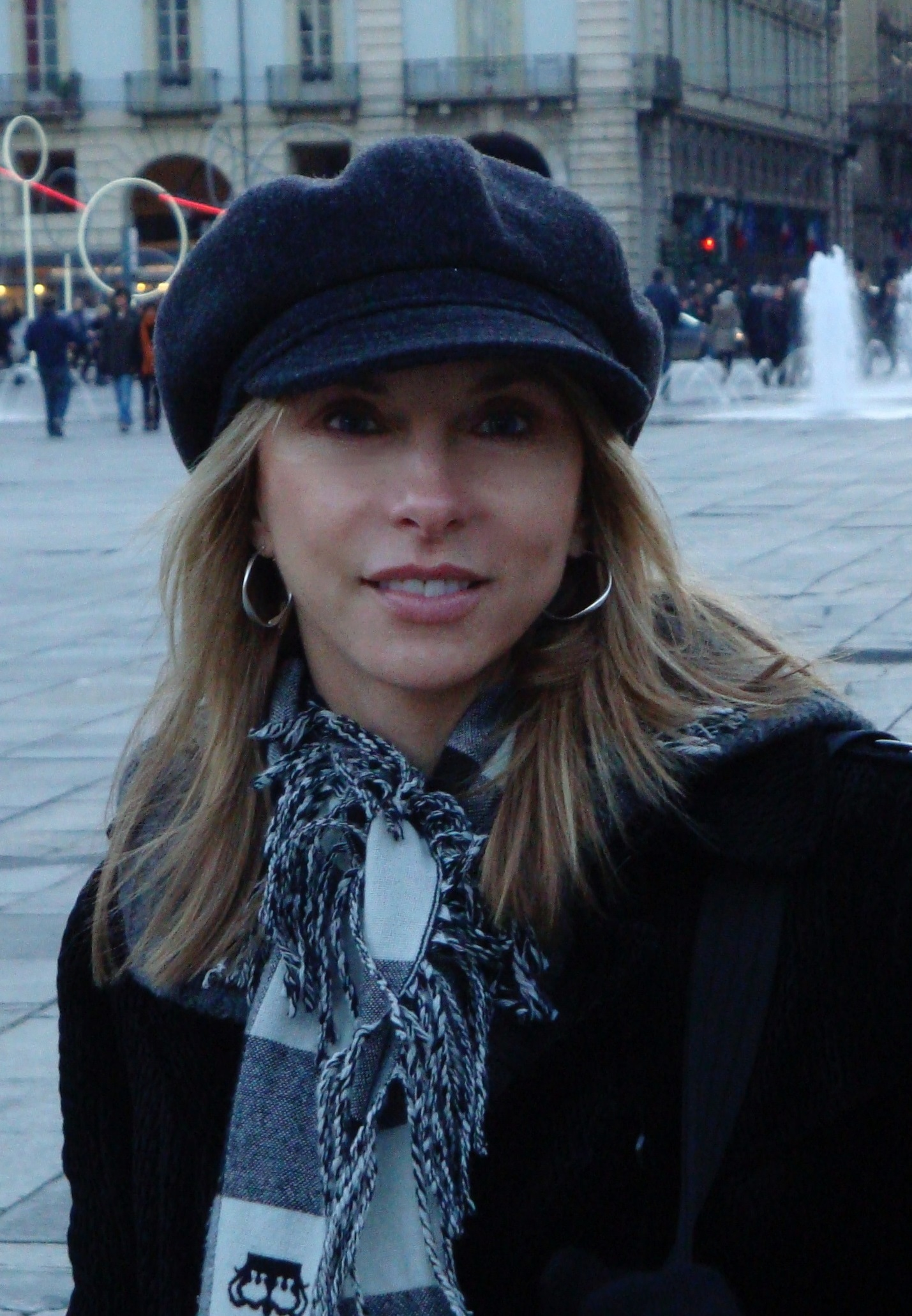
- Education: Pomona College
- Occupations: Producer, author, director
- Years active: 1992 - Present
- Spouse: John Gray(m. 2006)
- Website: melissajopeltier.com

Melissa Jo Peltier is a New York-based American producer and author. She produced, wrote and directed the 1994 A&E documentary mini-series Titanic: Death of a Dream and Titanic: The Legend Lives On, the show Dog Whisperer with Cesar Millan. She has also co-authored five books with Millan on the subject of raising and training dogs. In 2013, she published her first novel, entitled Reality Boulevard.

Peltier has won two News & Documentary Emmy awards and received the Humanitas Prize in 1993 for the documentary Scared Silent: Exposing and Ending Child Abuse.

== Background and career ==
Peltier was born and raised in New England, graduating cum laude from Pomona College in Claremont.

She directed and co-wrote the primetime documentary special, Scared Silent: Exposing and Ending Child Abuse, hosted by Oprah Winfrey, released in 1992. The documentary earned her a Humanitas Prize. Later, she directed and wrote the Breaking the Silence: Kids Against Child Abuse, which won a Peabody Award in 1995. In 1994, she was producer, director and writer of A&E’s four-hour miseries, Titanic: Death of a Dream and Titanic: The Legend Lives On. Peltier received the News and Documentary Emmy Award for this documentary for outstanding documentary writing.

In 1996, Peltier co-founded MPH Entertainment with two other business partners. She executive-produced the TV show Dog Whisperer with Cesar Millan (2004-2012). She also wrote and directed multiple episodes for the series.

In 2010, she produced the movie White Irish Drinkers, which was directed by her husband.

== Books ==
Peltier has co-authored, with Cesar Millan, five books all of which became New York Times Bestsellers. She also co-authored The Mommy Docs Ultimate Guide to Pregnancy and Birth in 2011.

=== Reality Boulevard ===
In 2014, Peltier wrote the novel, Reality Boulevard. The story of the novel is based on what happens to a group of idealistic filmmakers after their long running documentary series is cancelled and they are thrust into the assembly line world of reality TV. The book was named to Kirkus Reviews' Best Books of 2013.

== Selected filmography ==
Year	Title	Notes
1992	Scared Silent: Exposing and Ending Child Abuse	Director, co-writer
1993	Break the Silence: Kids Against Child Abuse.	Director, writer
1994	Titanic Death of a Dream & The Legend Lives On	Producer, director and writer
1996	The Real Las Vegas	Executive producer, writer
1998	Eco-Challenge Australia	Executive producer
1998	Lusitania: Murder on the Atlantic	Producer, writer
1999	The History of Sex	Executive producer, writer
2000	Founding Fathers	Executive producer, writer
2002	Founding Brothers	Executive producer, writer
2002	My Big Fat Greek Wedding	Co-executive producer
2003	Nightwaves	Screenwriter
2004	The New Roswell: Kecksburg Exposed	Director, writer
2004 - 2012	Dog Whisperer with Cesar Millan	Executive producer, writer and segment director
2010	White Irish Drinkers	Producer
2022	The Game Is Up	Director, writer

== Personal life ==
Peltier is married to John Gray, a screenwriter, director and producer.

== Bibliography ==
- Cesar's Way: The Natural, Everyday Guide to Understanding and Correcting Common Dog Problems co-authored with Cesar Millan. (2007). ISBN 978-0-307-33797-9
- Be the Pack Leader: Use Cesar's Way to Transform Your Dog . . . and Your Life co-authored with Cesar Millan. (2007). ISBN 978-0-307-38167-5
- A Member of the Family: Cesar Millan's Guide to a Lifetime of Fulfillment with Your Dog co-authored with Cesar Millan. (2008). ISBN 978-0-307-40891-4
- How to Raise the Perfect Dog: Through Puppyhood and Beyond co-authored with Cesar Millan. (2009). ISBN 978-0-307-46129-2
- Cesar's Rules: Your Way to Train a Well-Behaved Dog co-authored with Cesar Millan. (2010). ISBN 978-0-307-71686-6
- The Mommy Docs' Ultimate Guide to Pregnancy and Birth co-authored with Yvonne Bohn, Allison Hill, Alane Park. (2011). ISBN 978-0738214603
- Reality Boulevard. (2013). ISBN 978-1910167540

== Awards and honors ==
- Women in Film Award - 1991
- Humanitas Prize for Scared Silent: Exposing and Ending Child Abuse - 1993
- News and Documentary Emmy Award for Outstanding writing for Titanic: Death of a Dream - 1995
