= MPH Entertainment, Inc. =

American film and television production company

MPH Entertainment
- Industry: Film production Television production Television specials
- Founded: January 1996; 30 years ago
- Founders: Jim Milio; Melissa Jo Peltier; Mark Hufnail
- Headquarters: United States
- Area served: Worldwide
- Key people: Jim Milio (president); Melissa Jo Peltier (president); Mark Hufnail (president)

MPH Entertainment, Inc. is an American production company, focusing on feature films, television series, and specials. It was founded in January 1996 by Jim Milio, Melissa Jo Peltier, and Mark Hufnail. They are best known for being co-executive producers for the independent film My Big Fat Greek Wedding, and producers of the hit National Geographic Channel series, Dog Whisperer.
