= Matt Graham (survivalist) =

American survivalist and television personality (born 1974)

- Born: August 8, 1974 (age 52); Pierre, South Dakota
- Occupations: Survivalist, TV host
- Known for: Dual Survival

Matt Graham (born August 8, 1974), is an American survivalist and television personality who co-hosted the Discovery Channel reality show Dual Survival, and also Dude, You're Screwed.

== Biography ==
Graham was born on August 8, 1974, in Pierre, South Dakota.

Graham is a co-host of the Discovery Channel reality television show Dude, You're Screwed. He also co-hosted the survival show Dual Survival for the latter part of season 4, and all of seasons 5 and 6.

In 2016 Graham joined the cast of National Geographic Channel's Live Free or Die.

== Filmography ==
Year	Title	Role	Notes
2013–2014	Dude, You're Screwed	Himself	14 episodes
2014–2015	Dual Survival	Himself	16 episodes
2016	Live Free or Die	Himself	
2017	Bushcraft build off challenge	Host	
2019	First man out	Himself	
2020	Surviving the stone age	Himself	
