= Wild (TV series) =

American documentary series

- Genre: Documentary; Animals; Nature
- Narrated by: Salvatore Vecchio
- Country of origin: United States
- Original language: English
- No. of episodes: 84

Production
- Running time: 60 minutes (with commercials)

Original release
- Network: National Geographic Channel
- Release: 2006 – present

Wild is a one-hour American documentary television series that premiered in 2006 on the National Geographic Channel.
