= Live Free or Die (TV series) =

American reality television series

Live Free or Die on the National Geographic Channel

Live Free or Die is an American reality television series hosted by National Geographic Channel. The show follows the lives of people attempting to live off the grid in backwoods and swamps.

The cast focus on sustaining themselves through hunting, fishing, bartering, and surviving off the land. Shelters tend to consist of only raw materials, which are found, created or bartered.

Each participant offers survival tips and advice as a cameraman follows them performing their tasks

Live Free or Die was canceled in 2016 after 28 episodes and three seasons.

The cast includes:

- Colbert Sturgeon, of Moultrie, Georgia;
- Thorn, who lives deep in the Blue Ridge Mountains;
- Tony and Amelia Stevens, who also live in the Blue Ridge Mountains;
- Derik Stevens, a mountain man living off-the-grid, twenty miles from Boulder, Colorado;
- Tobias Corwin, a desert primitive survival skills expert living outside of Prescott, Arizona;
- Matt Graham;
