= List of African-American actors =

This is a list of African-American actors by alphabetical order.

To be included in this list, the person must have a Wikipedia article and/or references showing the person is African American and a notable actor. The list is organized chronologically, grouping actors by the surnames.

== Born in the 2010s ==
- Janice LeAnn Brown,actress
- Blue Ivy Carter, voice actress and singer
- Ravi Cabot-Conyers, actor
- Celestina Harris ,actress
- Melody Hurd, actress, dancer, and model
- Jaidyn Triplett, actress and singer
- North West (musician) , voice actress, rapper and singer
- Keivonn Woodard,actor

== Born in the 2000s ==
- Micah Abbey, actor (Ghanaian father)
- Halle Bailey, actress and singer
- Bailey Bass, actress (African-American father)
- Iman Benson, actress
- Asante Blackk , actor
- Marissa Bode, actress (African-American mother)
- Miles Brown, actor
- Shamon Brown Jr., actor
- Seth Carr, actor
- Lonnie Chavis, actor
- Chloe Coleman, actress (African-American father)
- Kyliegh Curran, actress
- Jonathan Daviss, actor
- Michael V. Epps, actor
- Priah Ferguson, actress
- Demetrius Flenory Jr., actor
- Benjamin Flores Jr., actor and rapper
- Jalyn Hall, actor
- Caleel Harris, actor
- Alex R. Hibbert, actor
- Arica Himmel, actress
- Chase Infiniti, actress (African-American father)
- Skai Jackson, actress
- Chosen Jacobs, actor and singer
- Chandler Kinney, actress
- Leah Sava Jeffries, actress
- Calah Lane, actress
- Adrian Lyles, actor and musician
- Marsai Martin, actress
- JD McCrary, actor and singer
- Caleb McLaughlin, actor
- Jaden Michael, actor
- Maleah Joi Moon, actress
- Michael Rainey Jr., actor
- Terrell Ransom Jr., actor
- Dara Reneé, actress
- Storm Reid, actress
- Ruth Righi, actress
- Izabela Rose, actress
- Marcus Scribner, actor
- Sayeed Shahidi, actor
- Yara Shahidi, actress and Harvard graduate (African-American mother)
- Savannah Lee Smith, actress
- Willow Smith, actress
- Trinitee Stokes, actress
- Daniella Taylor, actress (African-American father)
- Myles Truitt, actor
- Lexi Underwood, actress
- Quvenzhané Wallis, actress
- Keith L. Williams, actor
- Jahi Di'Allo Winston, actor
- Shahadi Wright Joseph, actress
- Sofia Wylie, actress
- Dallas Dupree Young, actor
- Laila Lockhart Kraner, actress (Dominican Dad)

== Born in the 1990s ==
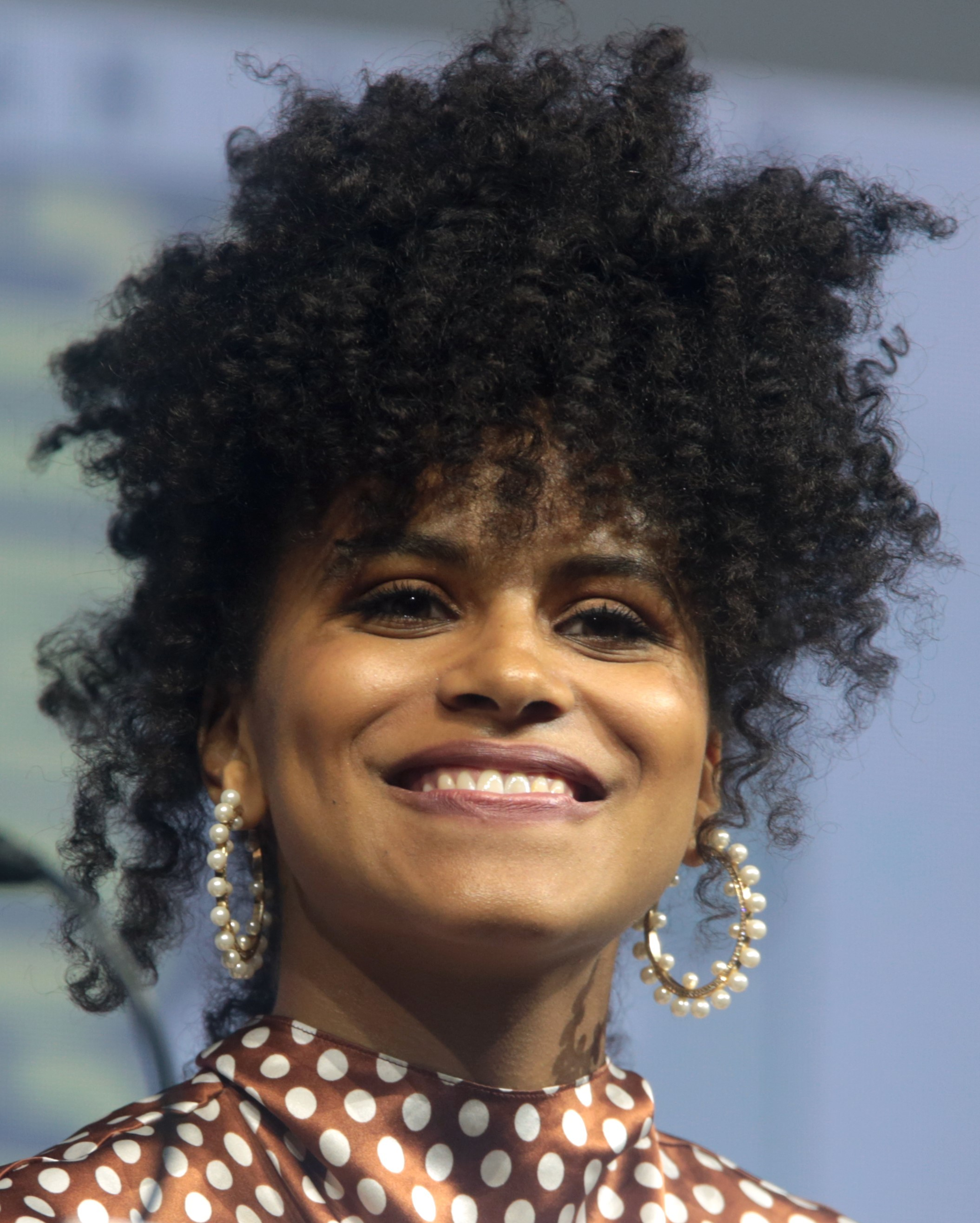
Zazie Beetz

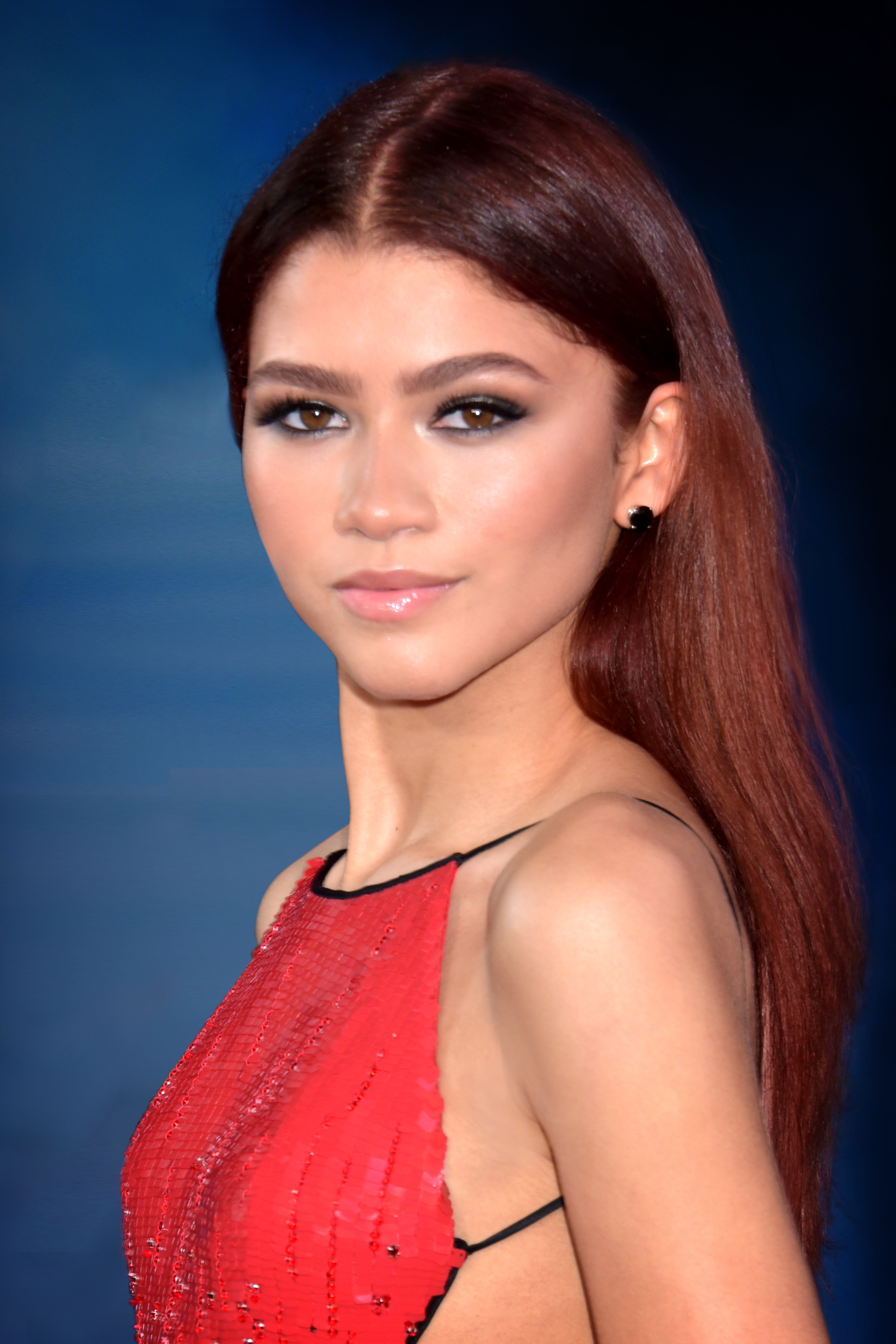
Zendaya Coleman

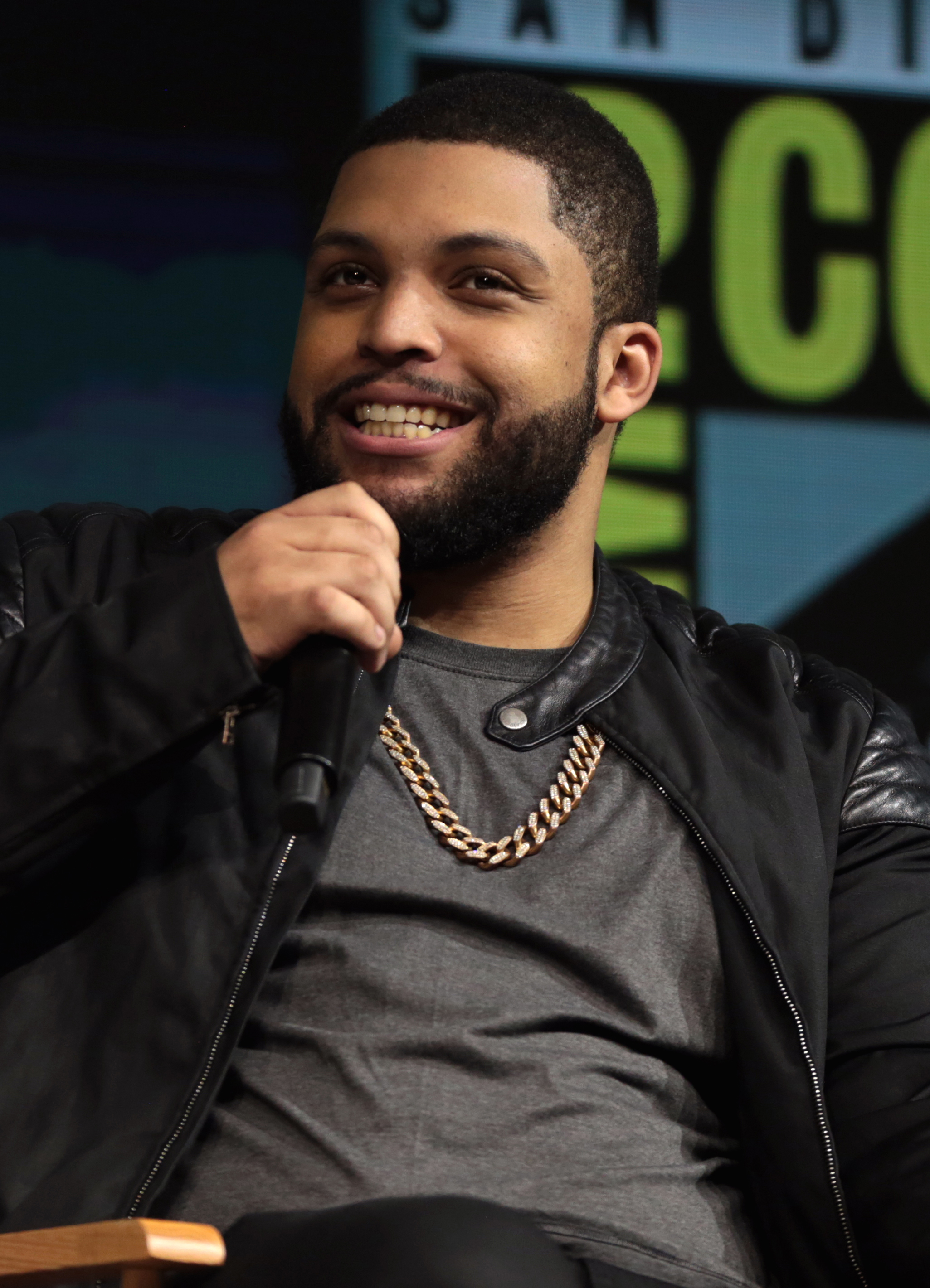
O'Shea Jackson Jr.

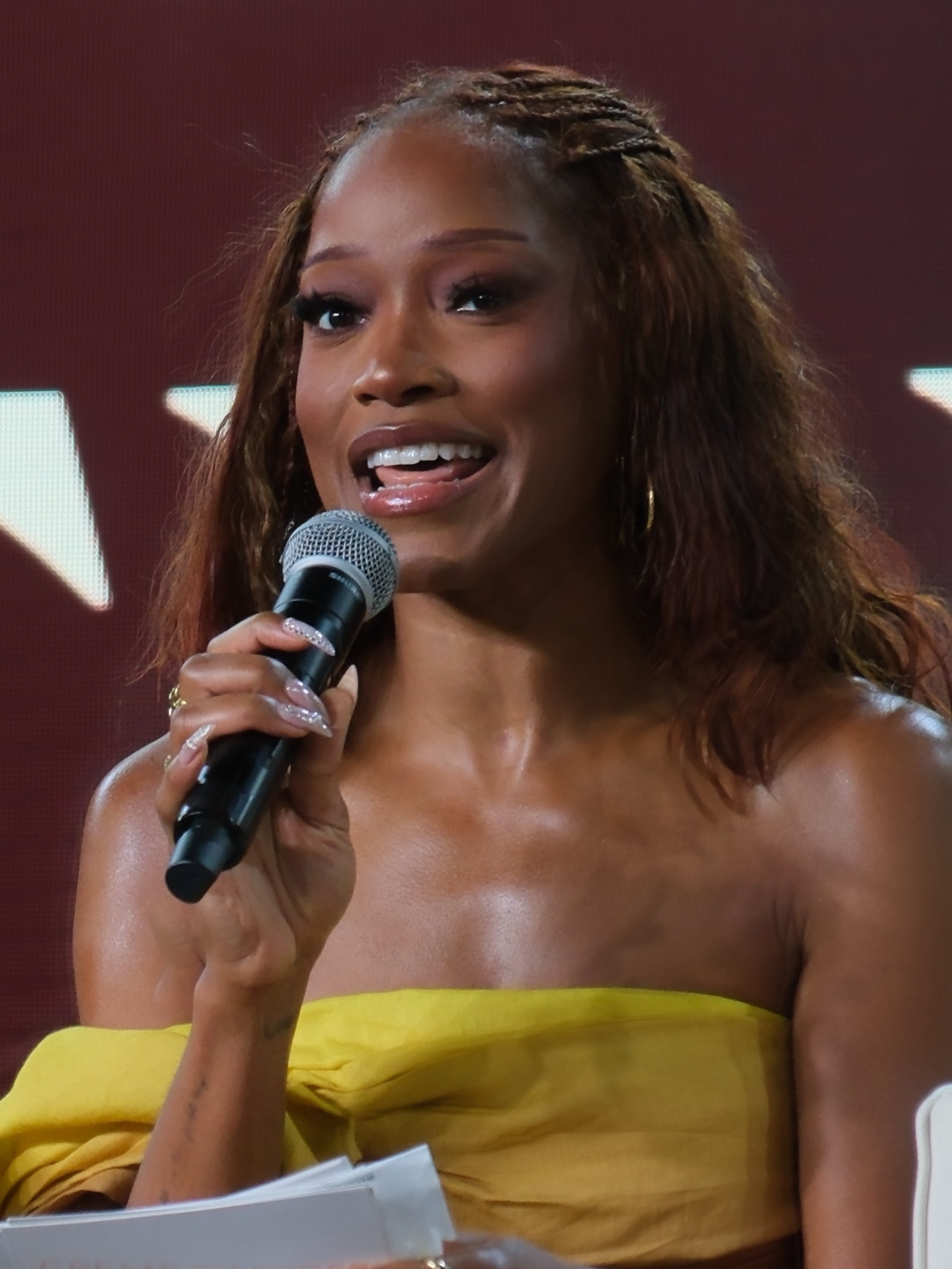
Keke Palmer

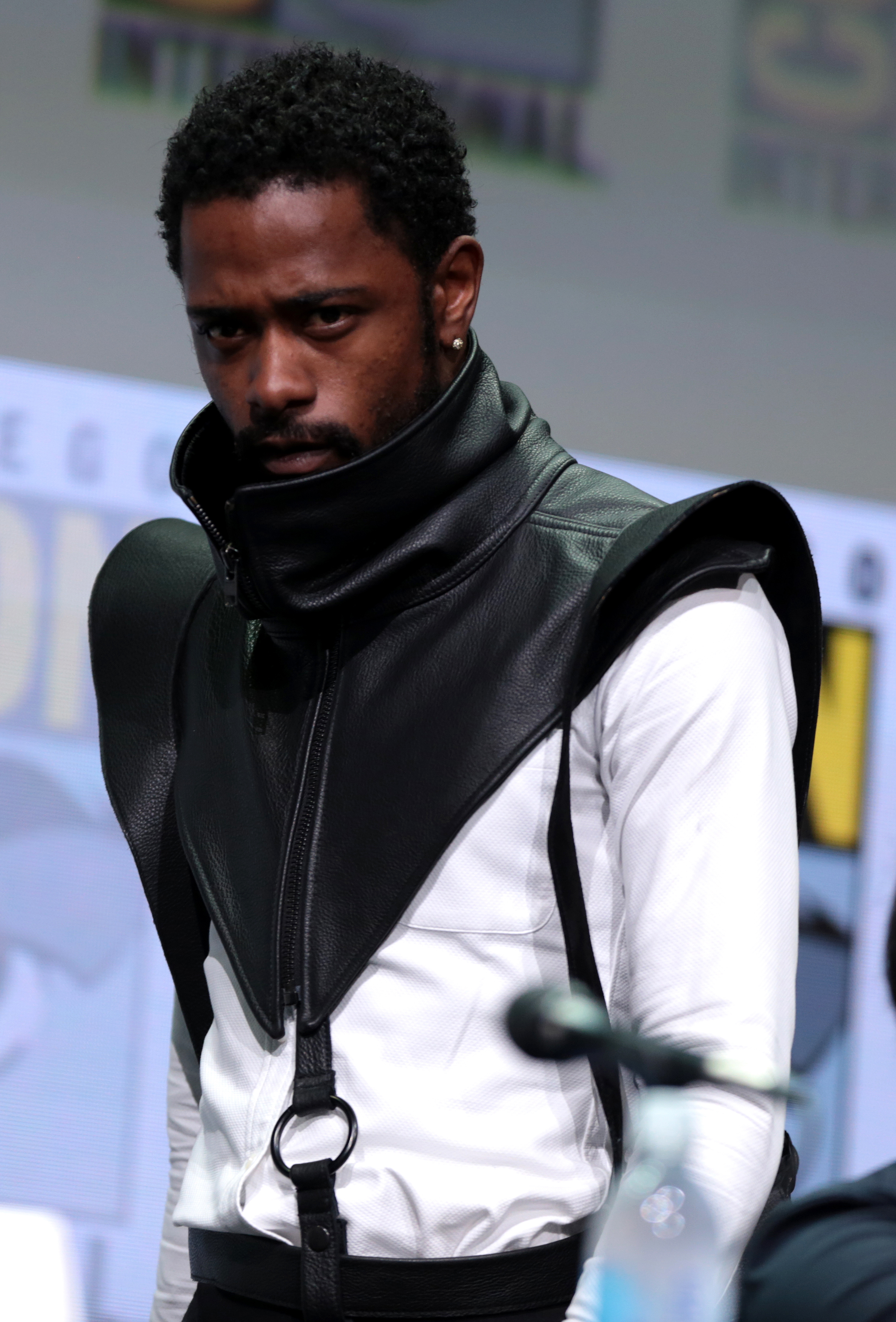
Lakeith Stanfield

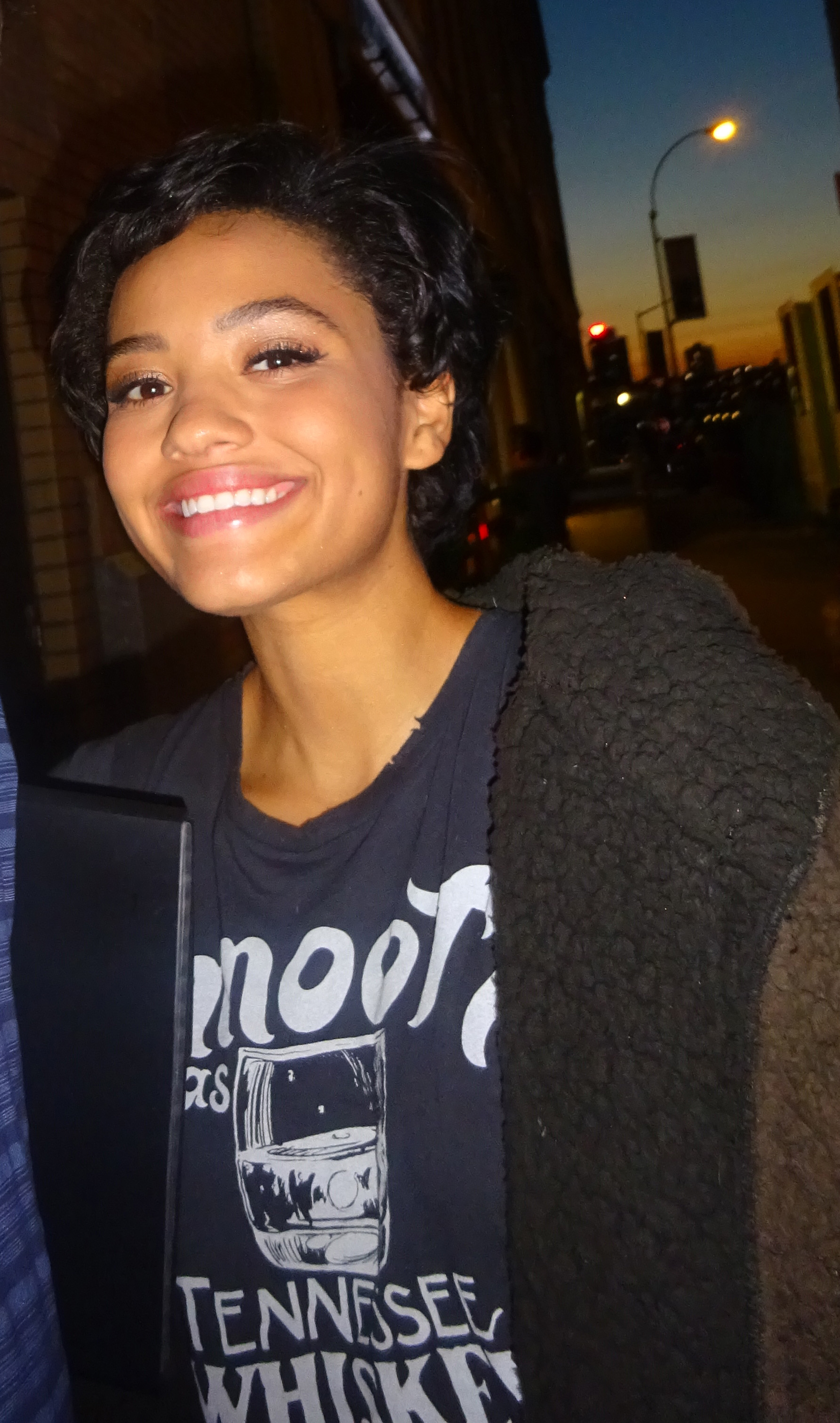
Kiersey Clemons

- Jordan Alexander, actress
- Ajiona Alexus, actress
- Chloe Bailey, actress and singer
- Madison Bailey, actress
- Jabari Banks, actor
- Jaylen Barron, actress (African-American father)
- Zazie Beetz, actress (African-American mother)
- Denée Benton, actress and singer
- Rhyon Nicole Brown, actress
- Jasmin Savoy Brown, actress
- Jordan Calloway, actor
- Sierra Capri, actress
- Chance The Rapper, rapper
- Kiersey Clemons, actress (African-American father)
- Zendaya Coleman, actress (African-American father)
- Dexter Darden, actor
- Aisha Dee, actress (African-American father)
- Dee Dee Davis, actress
- Ariana DeBose, actress
- Teala Dunn, actress
- Ayo Edebiri, actress
- Reign Edwards, actress
- Jimmie Fails, actor
- Roshon Fegan, actor
- Dominique Fishback, actress
- Jordan Fisher, actor
- Hampton Fluker, actor
- Rome Flynn, actor
- Tati Gabrielle, actress
- Antonia Gentry, actress
- Jacob Gibson, actor
- Raven Goodwin, actress
- Carlacia Grant, actress
- Brett Gray, actor
- Bryshere Gray, actor
- Imani Hakim, actress
- Kelvin Harrison Jr., actor
- Helena Howard, actress (African-American father)
- Paige Hurd, actress (African-American father)
- O'Shea Jackson Jr., actor and rapper
- Paris Jackson, actress (African-American father)
- Trevor Jackson, actor
- Carlon Jeffery, actor and rapper
- Sarah Jeffery, actress
- Nadji Jeter, actor
- Camrus Johnson, actor
- Coco Jones actress and singer
- Malcolm David Kelley, actor
- Jak Knight, actor, writer, and comedian
- Jacob Latimore, actor
- Jayme Lawson, actress
- Kiana Ledé, actress and singer (African-American father)
- Denny Love, actor
- Michael Luwoye, actor
- Christopher Massey, actor
- Kyle Massey, actor
- Miranda Rae Mayo, actress
- China Anne Mcclain, actress and singer
- Shane Paul McGhie, actor
- Parker McKenna Posey, actress
- Aeriel Miranda, actress
- Shameik Moore, actor and musician
- Laci Mosley actress and comedian
- Kiara Muhammad, actress
- Normani, singer
- Brittany O'Grady, actress (African-American mother)
- Keke Palmer, actress
- Serayah (actress) , actress
- Sydney Park, actress (African-American mother)
- Madison Pettis, actress (African-American father)
- Solea Pfeiffer, actress (African-American mother)
- Taylor Polidore, actress
- Nathaniel Potvin, actor
- Keith Powers, actor
- Trevante Rhodes, actor
- Tequan Richmond, actor
- Zeno Robinson, voice actor
- Lee Rodriguez, actress and singer
- Kara Royster, actress
- Kylee Russell, actress
- Alyah Chanelle Scott, actress
- Doc Shaw, actor
- Alexandra Shipp, actress (African-American father)
- Diggy Simmons, actor
- Lovie Simone, actress
- Jaz Sinclair, actress
- Paulina Singer, actress (African-American father)
- Algee Smith, actor
- Jaden Smith, actor and singer
- Lakeith Stanfield, actor
- Amandla Stenberg, actress (African-American mother)
- Coy Stewart, actor
- Joy Sunday, actress
- Chelsea Tavares, actress
- Leon Thomas III, actor
- Dominique Thorne, actress
- Tyler The Creator, actor
- Diamond White, voice actress and singer
- Tyler James Williams, actor
- Tyrel Jackson Williams, actor
- Arif Zahir, actor, musician and internet personality

== Born in the 1980s ==
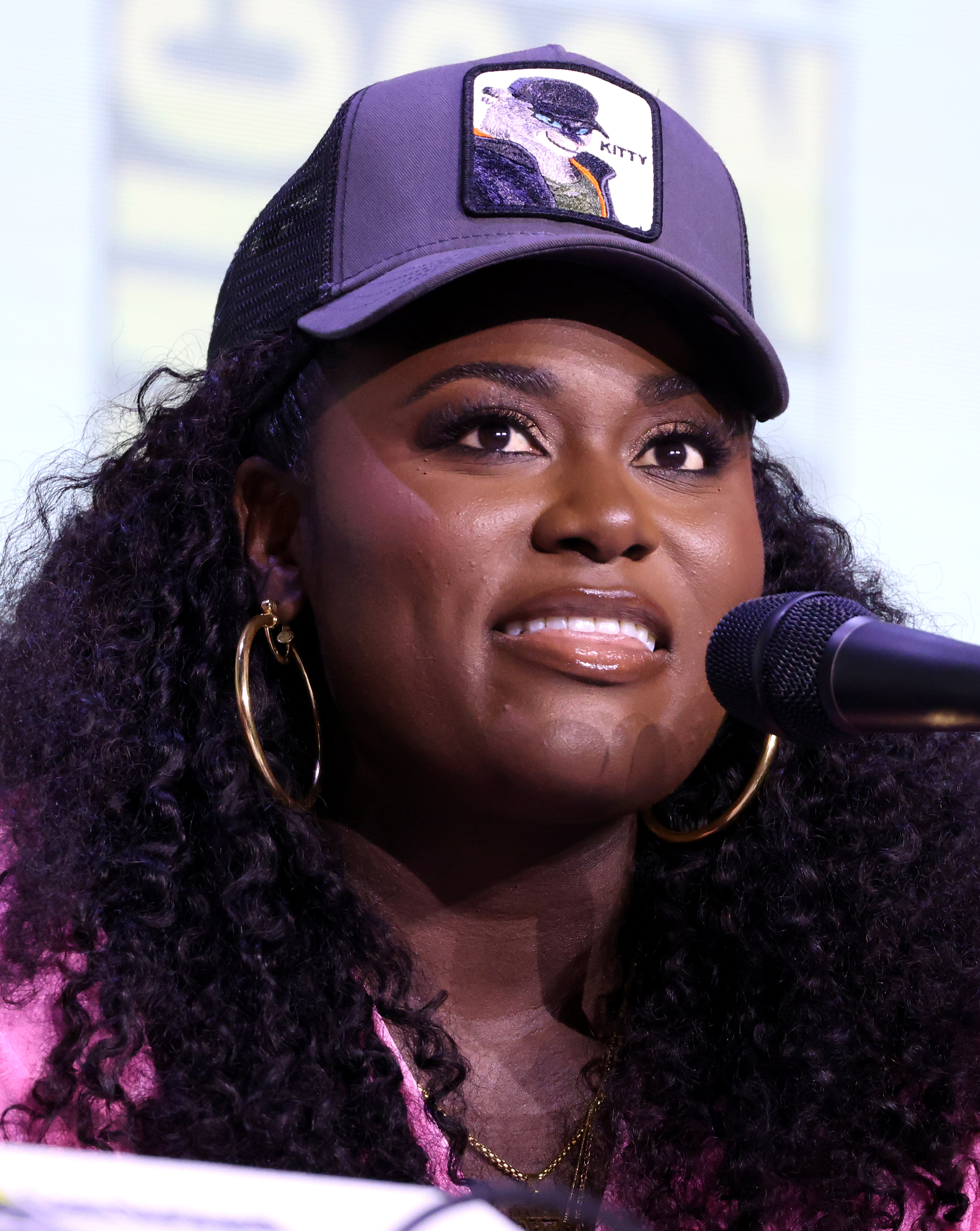
Danielle Brooks

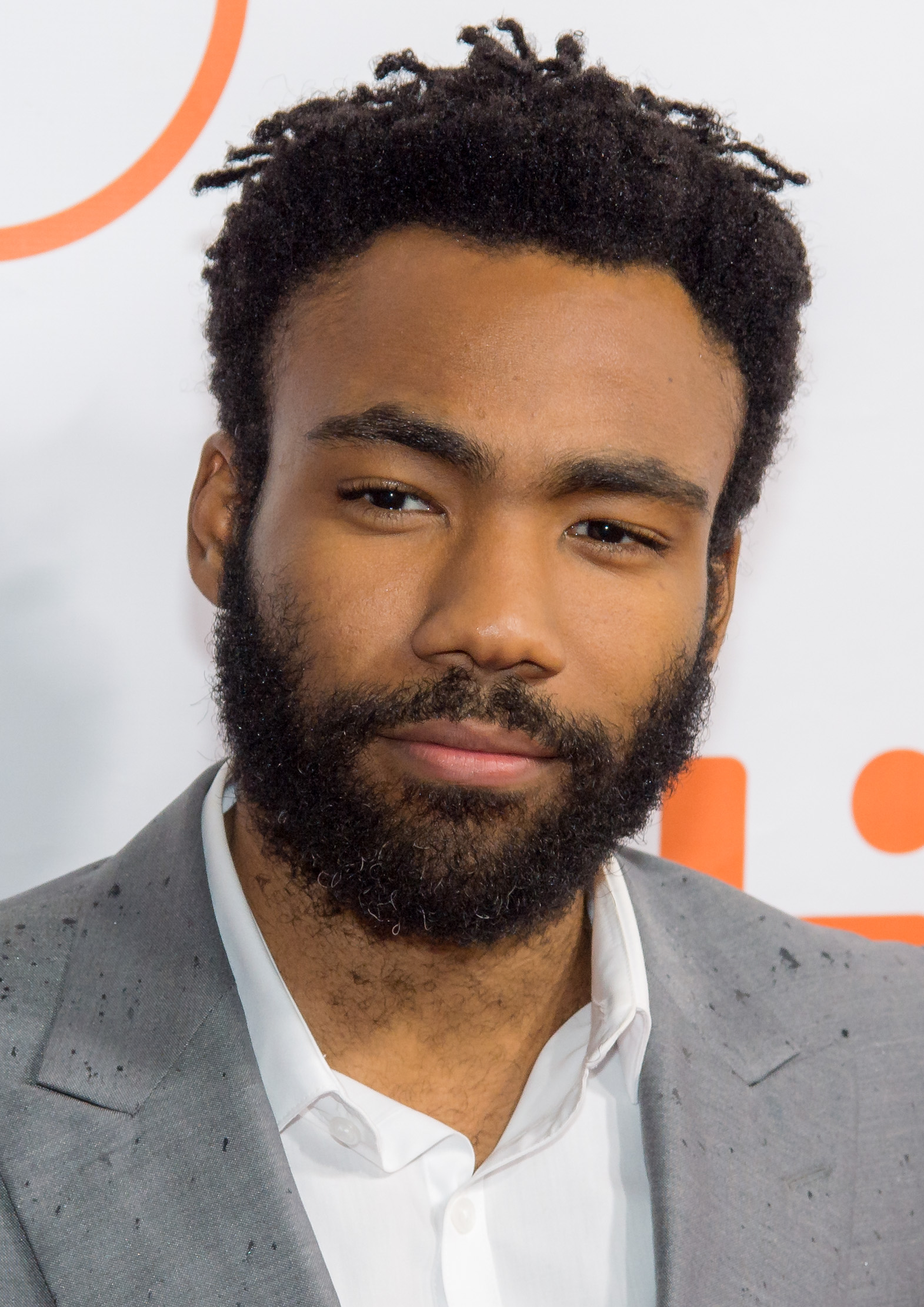
Donald Glover

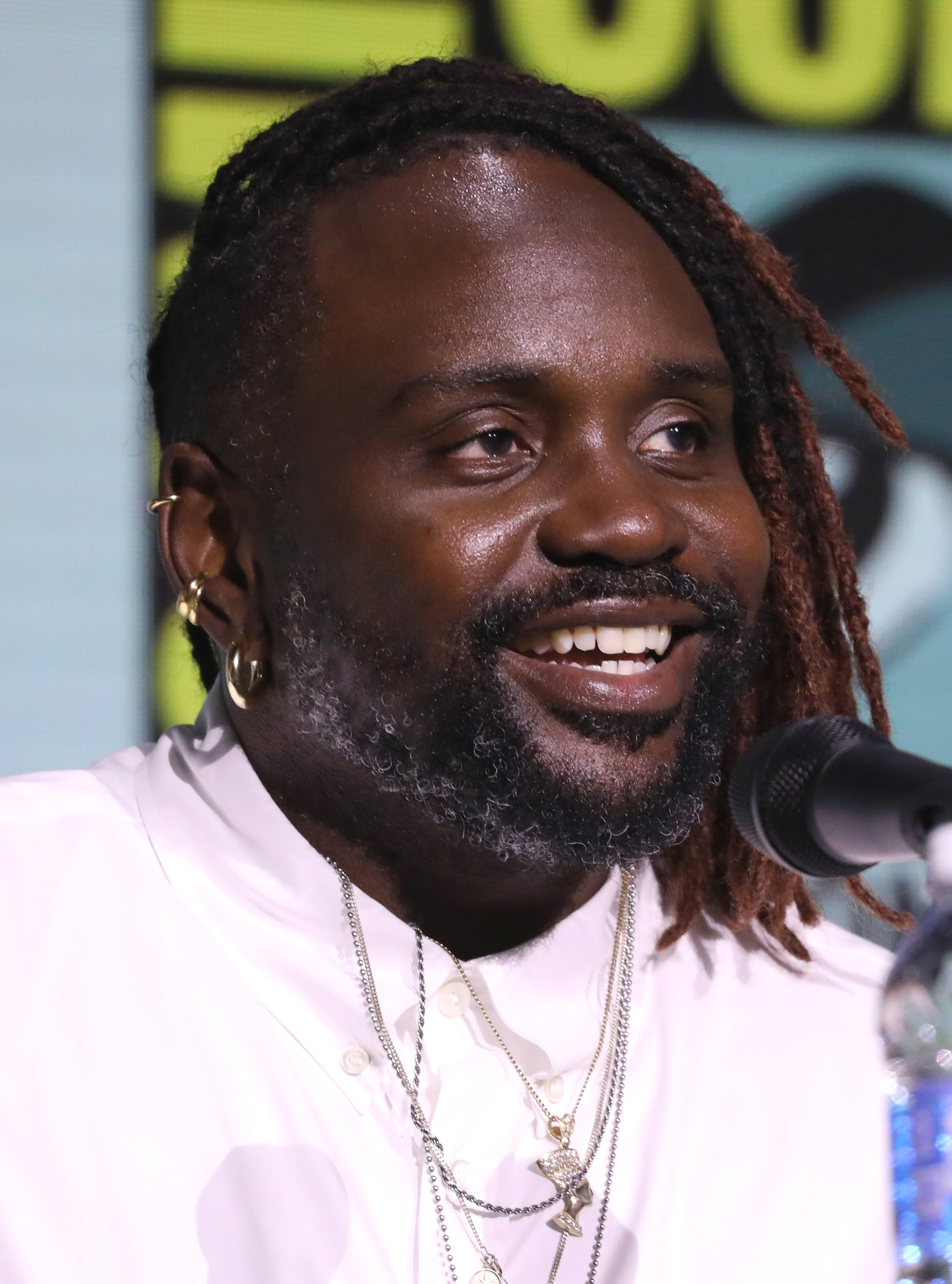
Brian Tyree Henry

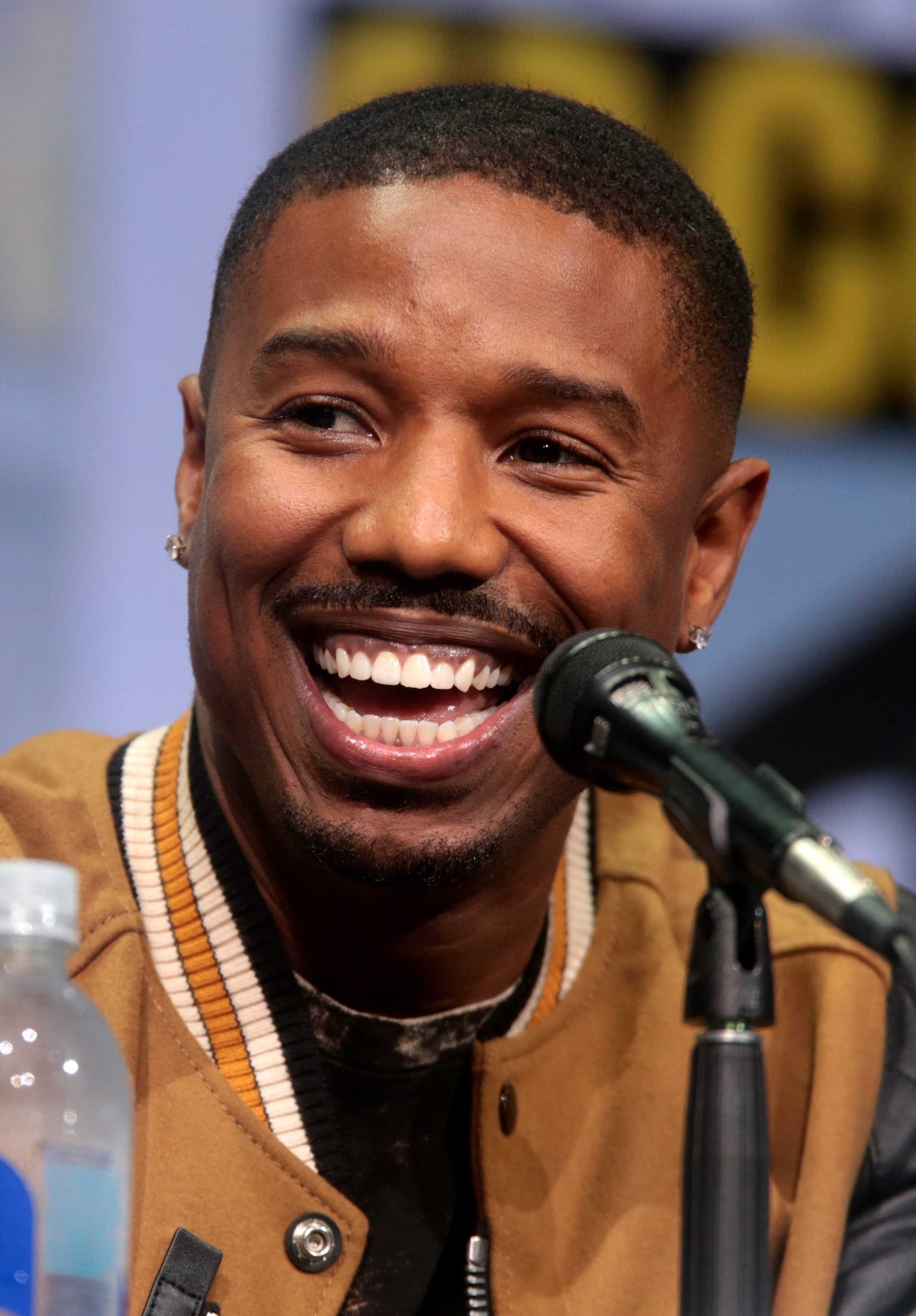
Michael B. Jordan

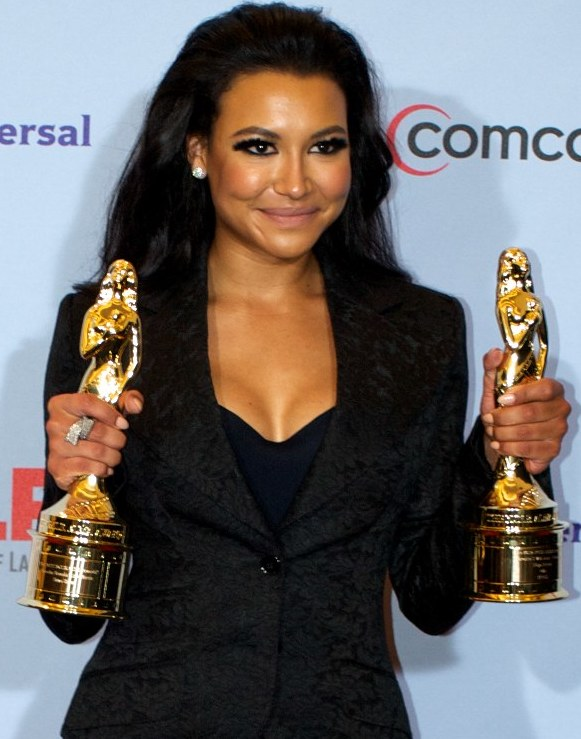
Naya Rivera

- Quinton Aaron, actor
- Lloyd Banks, actor
- Malcolm Barrett, actor
- Fantasia Barrino, actress and singer
- Jurnee Smollett-Bell, actress
- Beyoncé, actress and singer
- B.G., rapper
- Ser'Darius Blain, film and television actor
- Tiffany Boone, actress
- Steelo Brim, actor and comedian
- Danielle Brooks, actress
- Mehcad Brooks, actor
- Neil Brown Jr., actor
- Rob Brown, actor
- Logan Browning, actress
- Quinta Brunson, actress, producer and screenwriter
- Hannibal Buress, actor and comedian
- Trai Byers, actor
- Nick Cannon, actor
- Chingy, rapper
- Tanya Chisholm, actress and dancer
- Monique Coleman, actress
- Emayatzy Corinealdi, (African-American mother)
- Yaya DaCosta, actress
- Charles Michael Davis, actor
- Daveed Diggs, rapper and actor
- Drake, actor
- Edwina Findley, actress
- Jennifer Freeman, actress
- Darrell Britt-Gibson, actor
- Donald Glover, actor
- Reagan Gomez-Preston, actress writer, and producer (African-American father)
- Meagan Good, actress
- Elena Goode, actress (African-American father)
- Kat Graham, actress and singer
- Shalita Grant, actress
- Sonequa Martin-Green, actress
- Lance Gross, actor (African-American mother)
- Demetrius Grosse, actor
- Ilfenesh Hadera, actress
- William Jackson Harper, actor and comedian
- Corey Hawkins, actor
- Brian Tyree Henry, actor
- Jillian Hervey, singer and dancer
- Marques Houston, actor
- Jennifer Hudson, actress
- Amber Iman, actress
- Brandon T. Jackson, actor
- Bryton James, actor
- Terrence Jenkins, actor
- Sam Jones III, actor
- Michael B. Jordan, actor
- Wiz Khalifa, actor
- Christel Khalil, actress (African-American mother)
- Aja Naomi King, actress
- Zoe Kravitz, actress and filmmaker
- Lil Scrappy, rapper
- Lauren London, actress (African-American mother)
- Peter Macon, actor
- Jonathan Majors, actor
- Yahya Abdul-Mateen II, actor
- Kelly McCreary, actress
- Jason Mitchell, actor
- Monica, actress
- Victoria Monét, R&B singer (African-American mother)
- Lamorne Morris, actor
- Aaron Moten, actor
- Ashleigh Murray, actress
- Naturi Naughton, actress
- Angel Parker, actress
- Teyonah Parris, actress
- Candice Patton, actress
- Jay Pharoah, actor
- Kyla Pratt, actress
- Issa Rae, actress (African-American mother)
- Emmy Raver-Lampman, actress
- Rihanna, singer
- Sam Richardson, actor
- Amber Riley, actress and singer
- Naya Rivera, actress, singer and model (d. 2020)
- Evan Ross, actor and musician (African-American mother)
- Kelly Rowland actress and singer
- Amanda Seales, actress (African-American father)
- Gabourey Sidibe, actress
- Brian Michael Smith, actor
- Jussie Smollett, actor
- Jordin Sparks, actress
- Tika Sumpter, actress
- Raven-Symoné, actress, singer and director
- Jessica Szohr, actress
- Tessa Thompson, actress
- T.I., actor
- Tru Valentino, actor
- Amanda Warren, actress
- John David Washington, actor
- Damon Wayans Jr., actor and comedian
- Lil Wayne, actor
- Erinn Westbrook, actress
- Samira Wiley, actress
- Jessica Williams, actress
- Nafessa Williams, actress
- Lee Thompson Young, actor
- Young Buck, rapper
- Cynthia Addai-Robinson, actress(Ghanaian Mother)

== Born in the 1970s ==
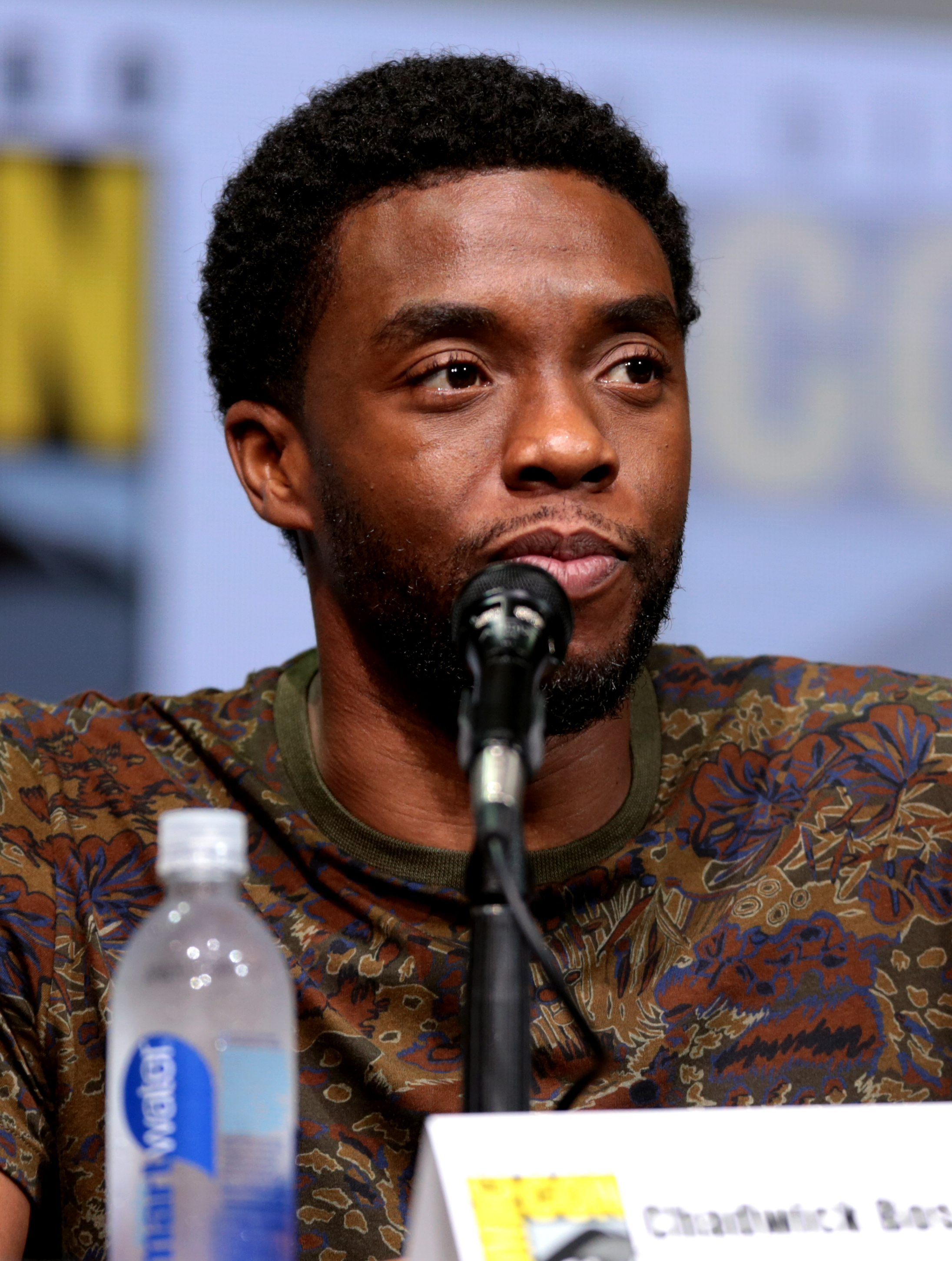
Chadwick Boseman

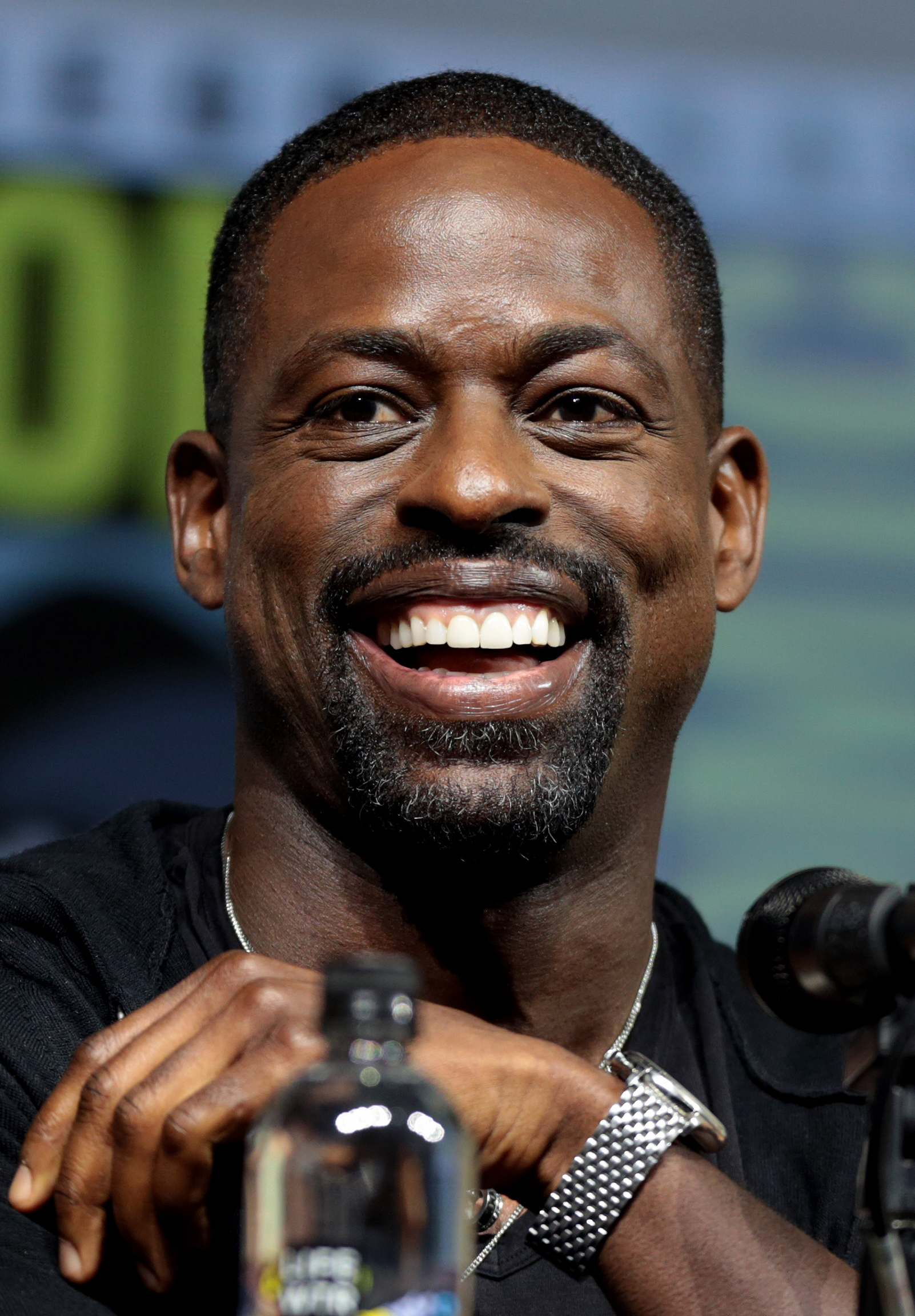
Sterling K. Brown

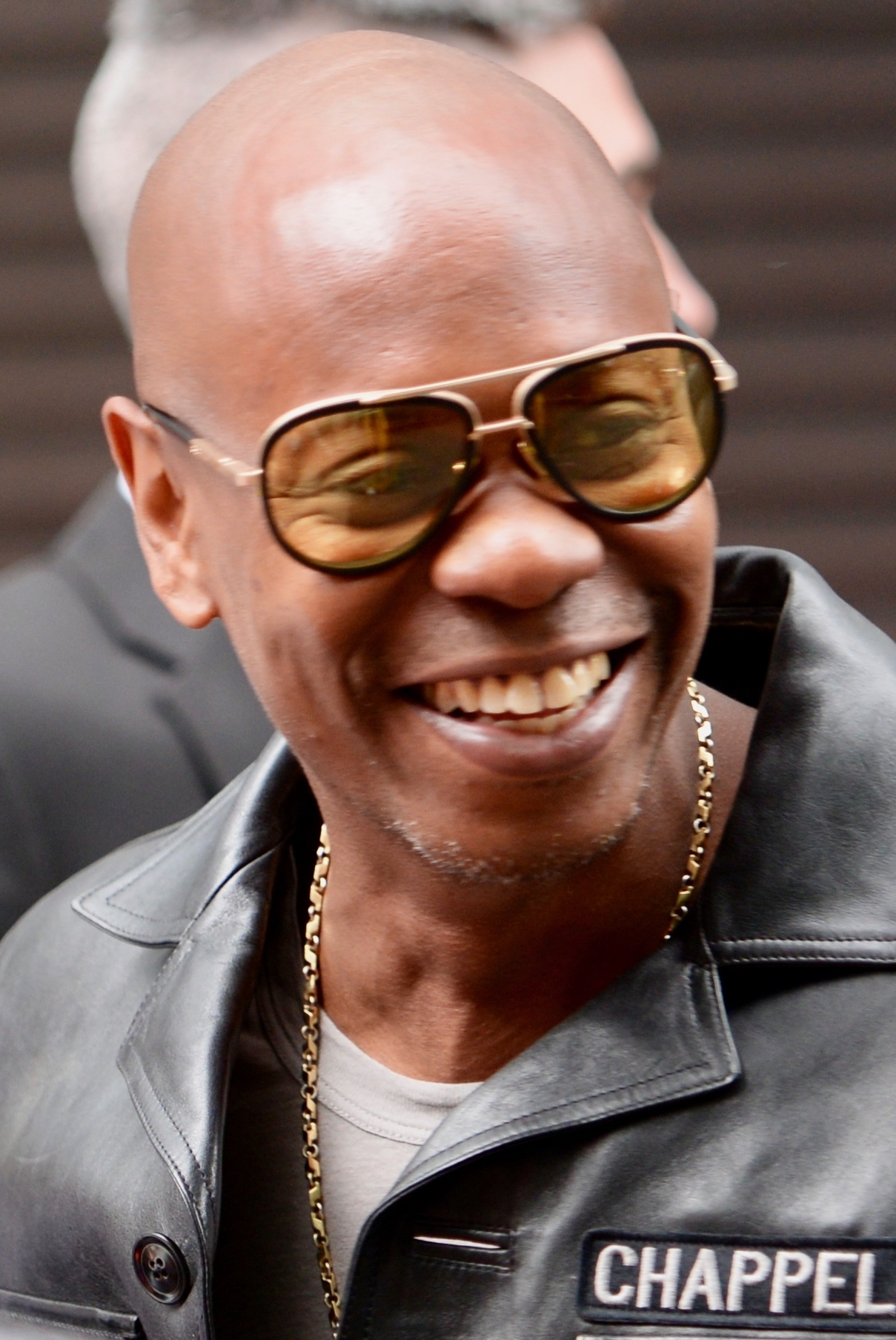
Dave Chappelle

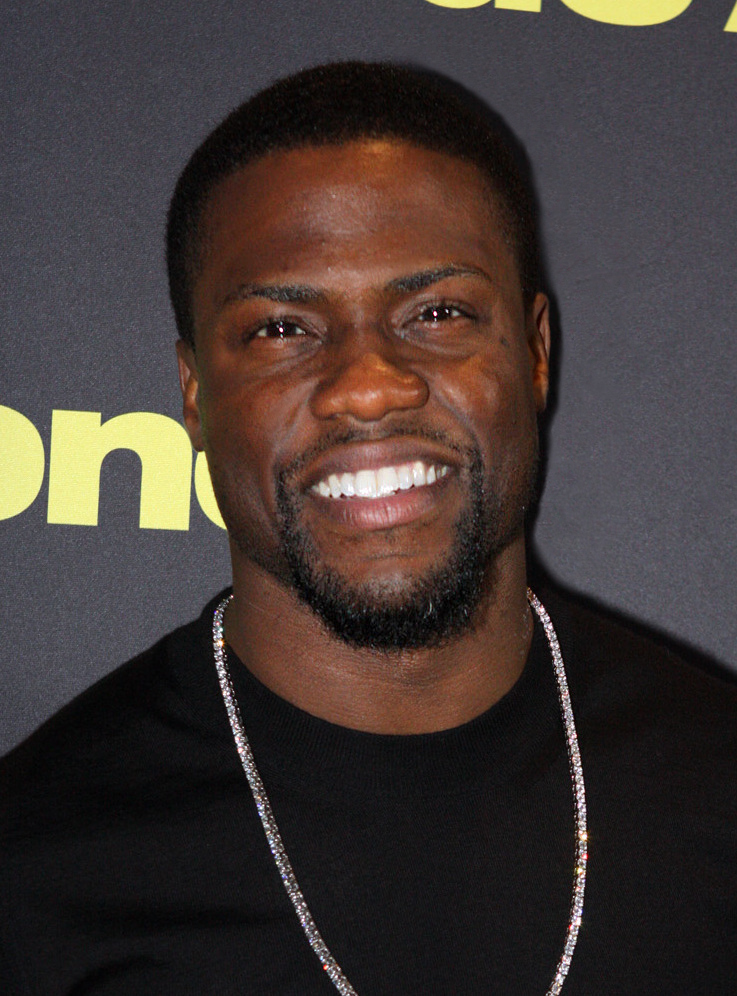
Kevin Hart

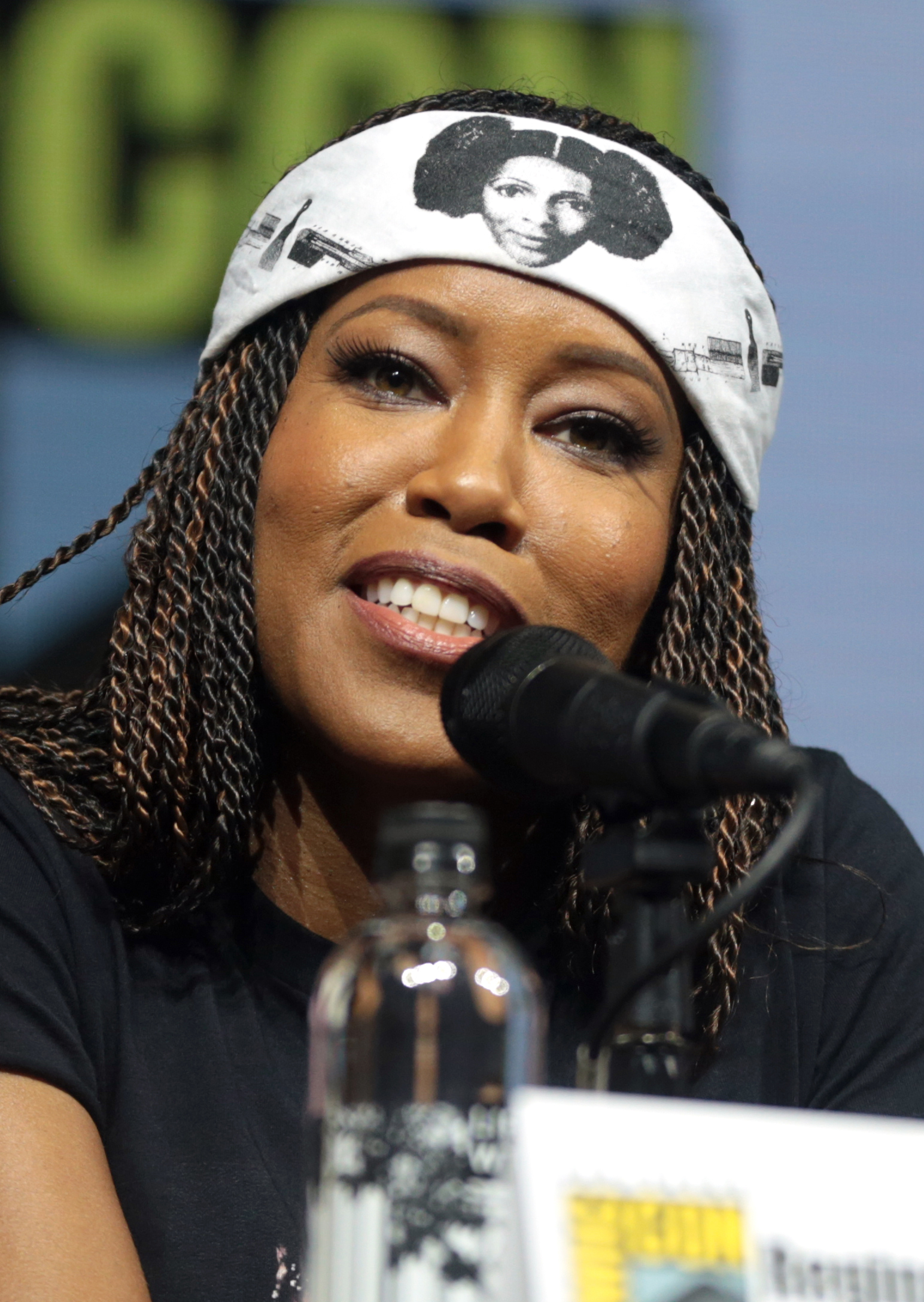
Regina King

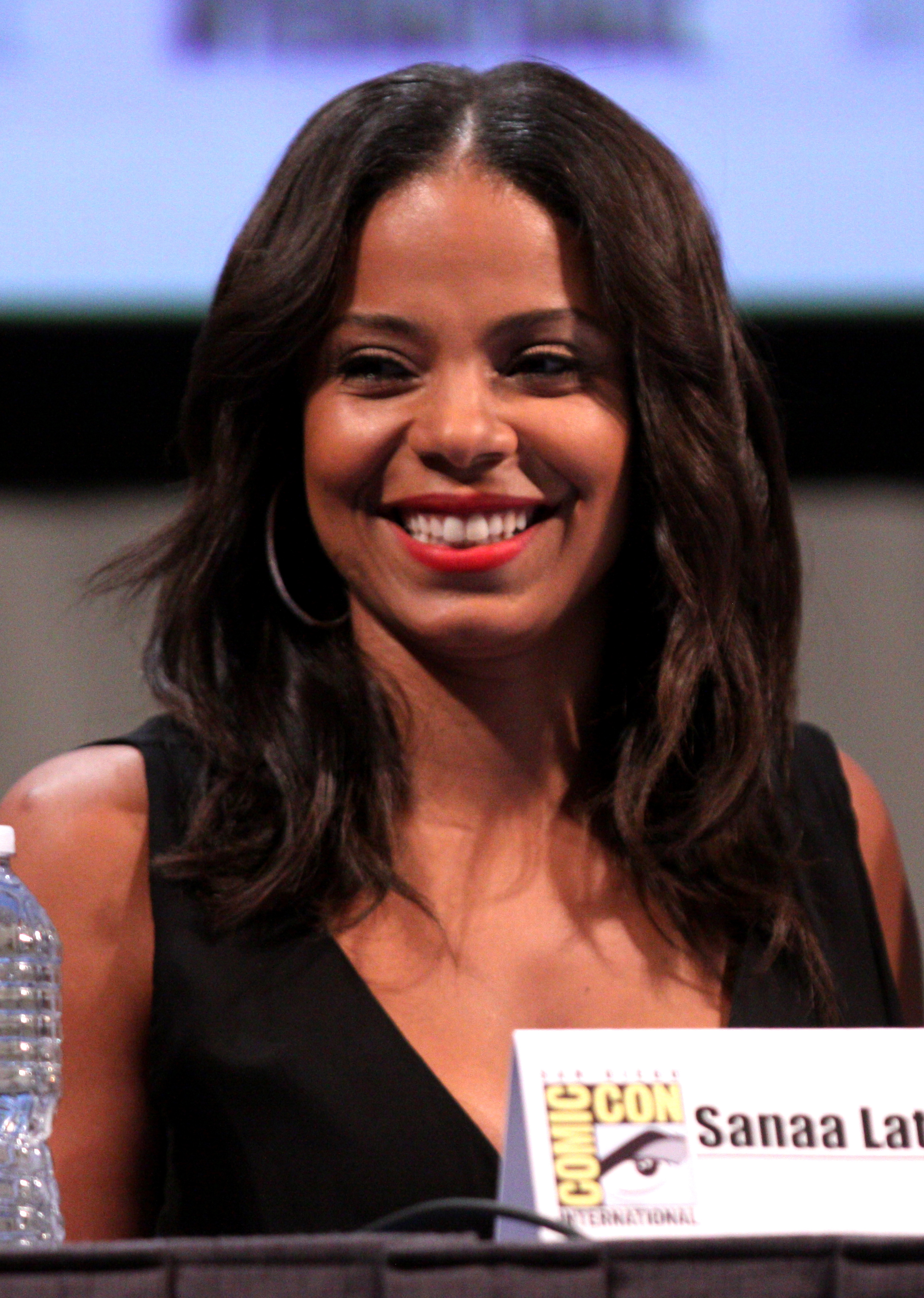
Sanaa Lathan

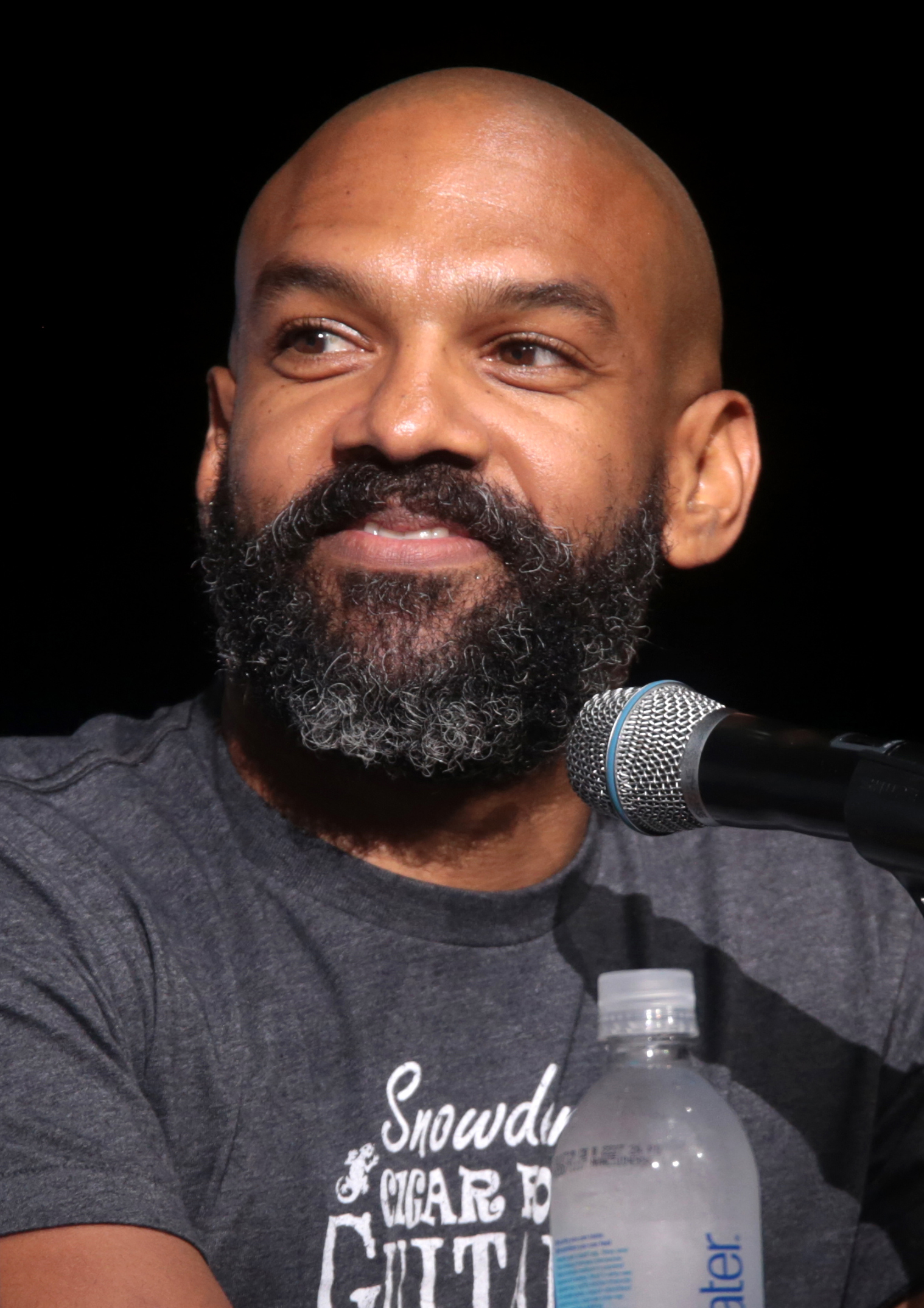
Khary Payton

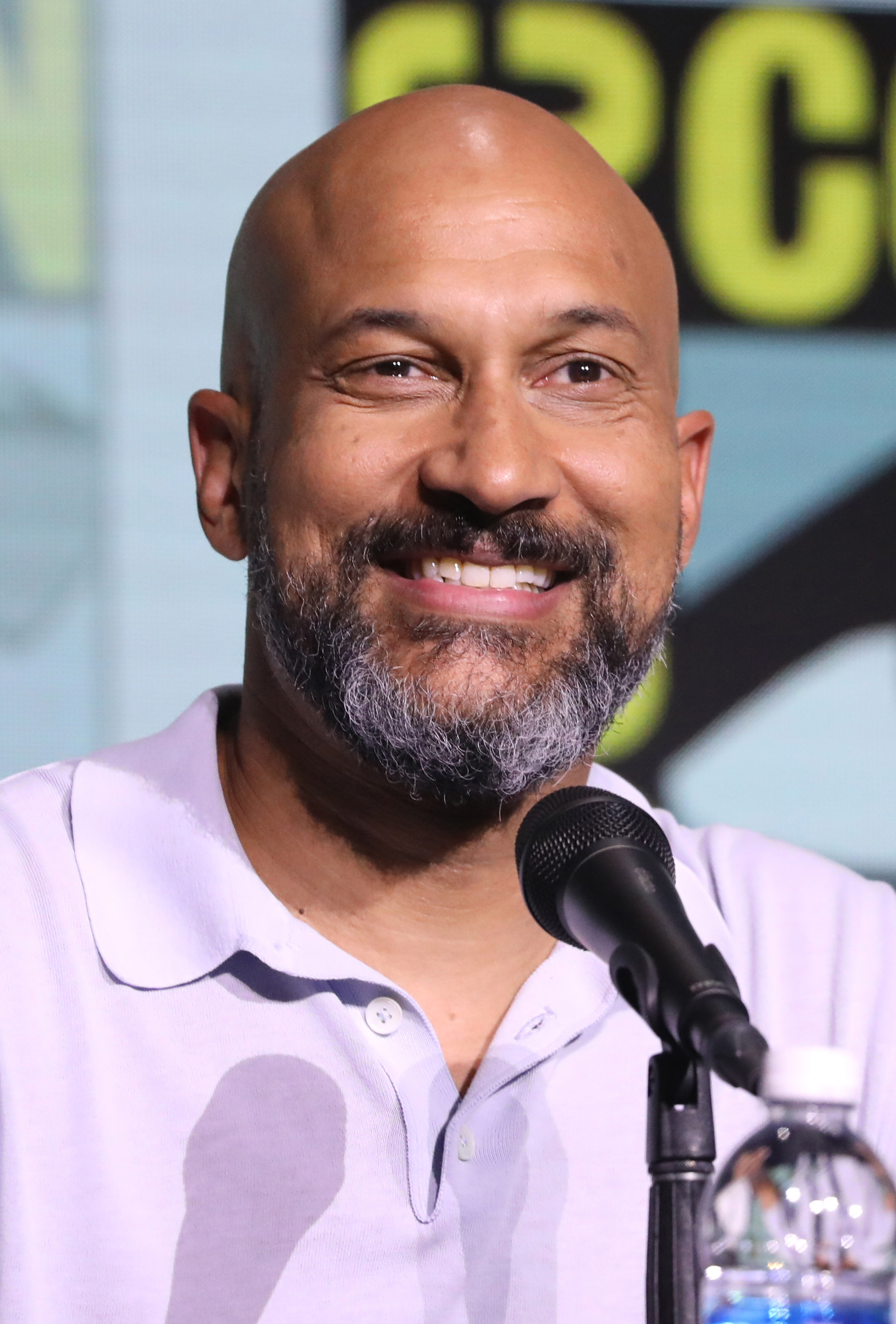
Keegan-Michael Key

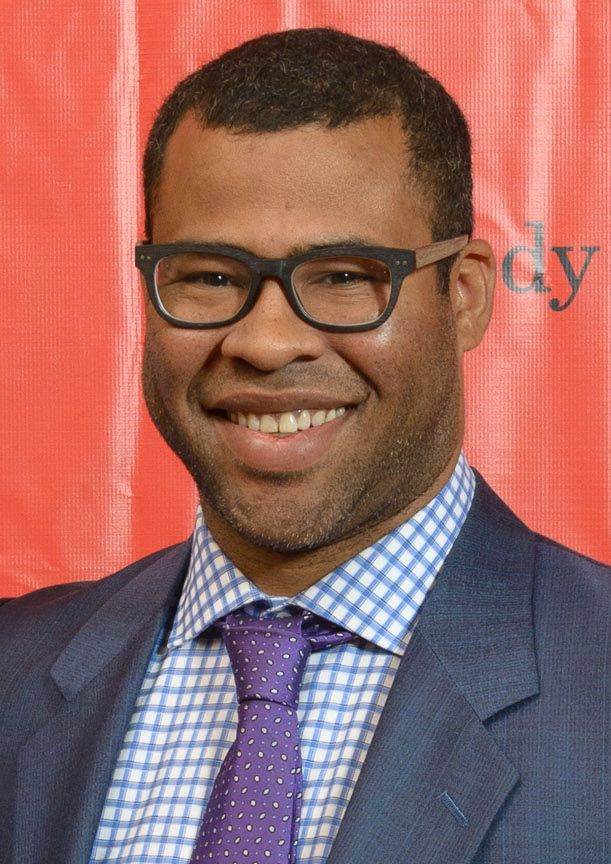
Jordan Peele

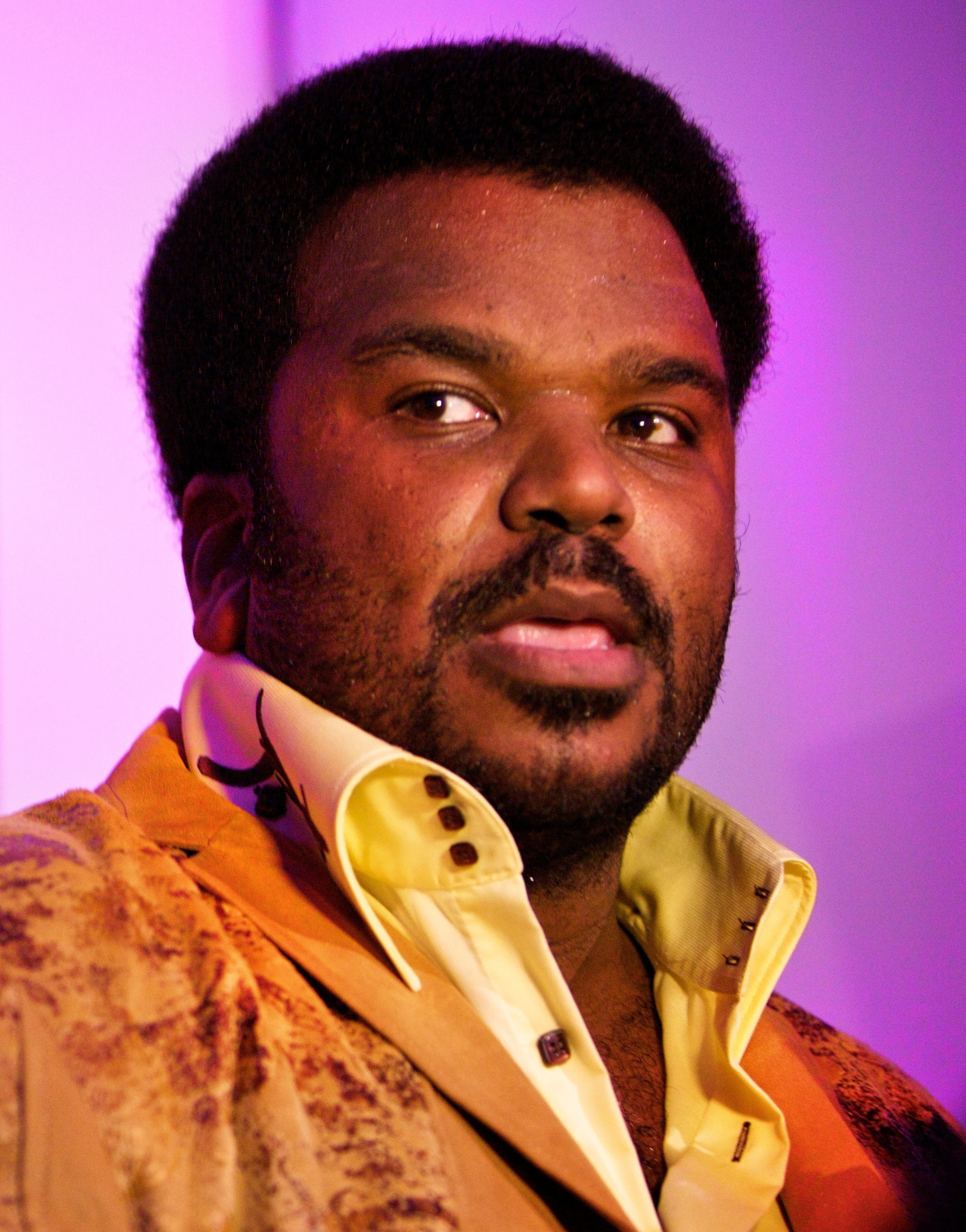
Craig Robinson

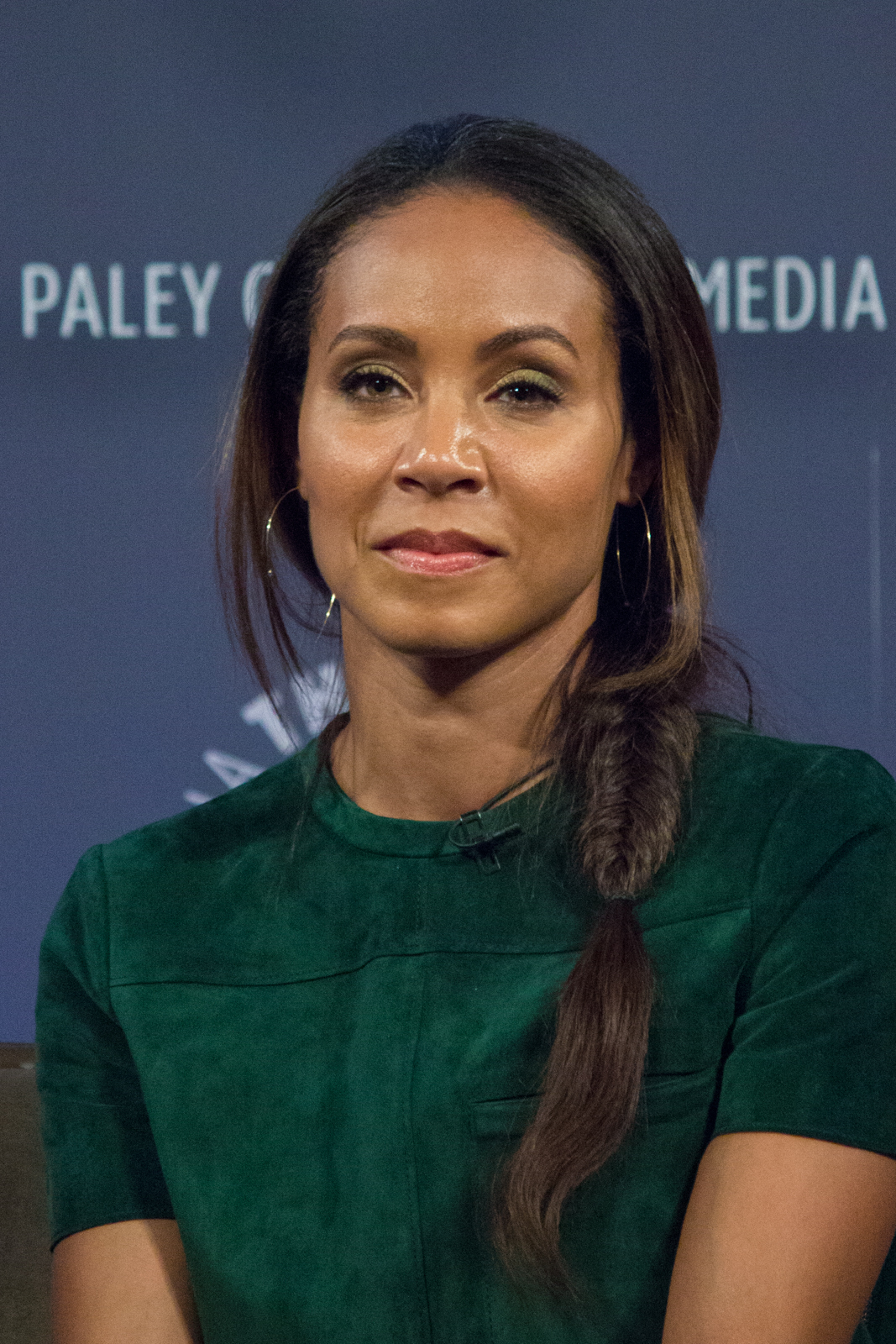
Jada Pinkett Smith

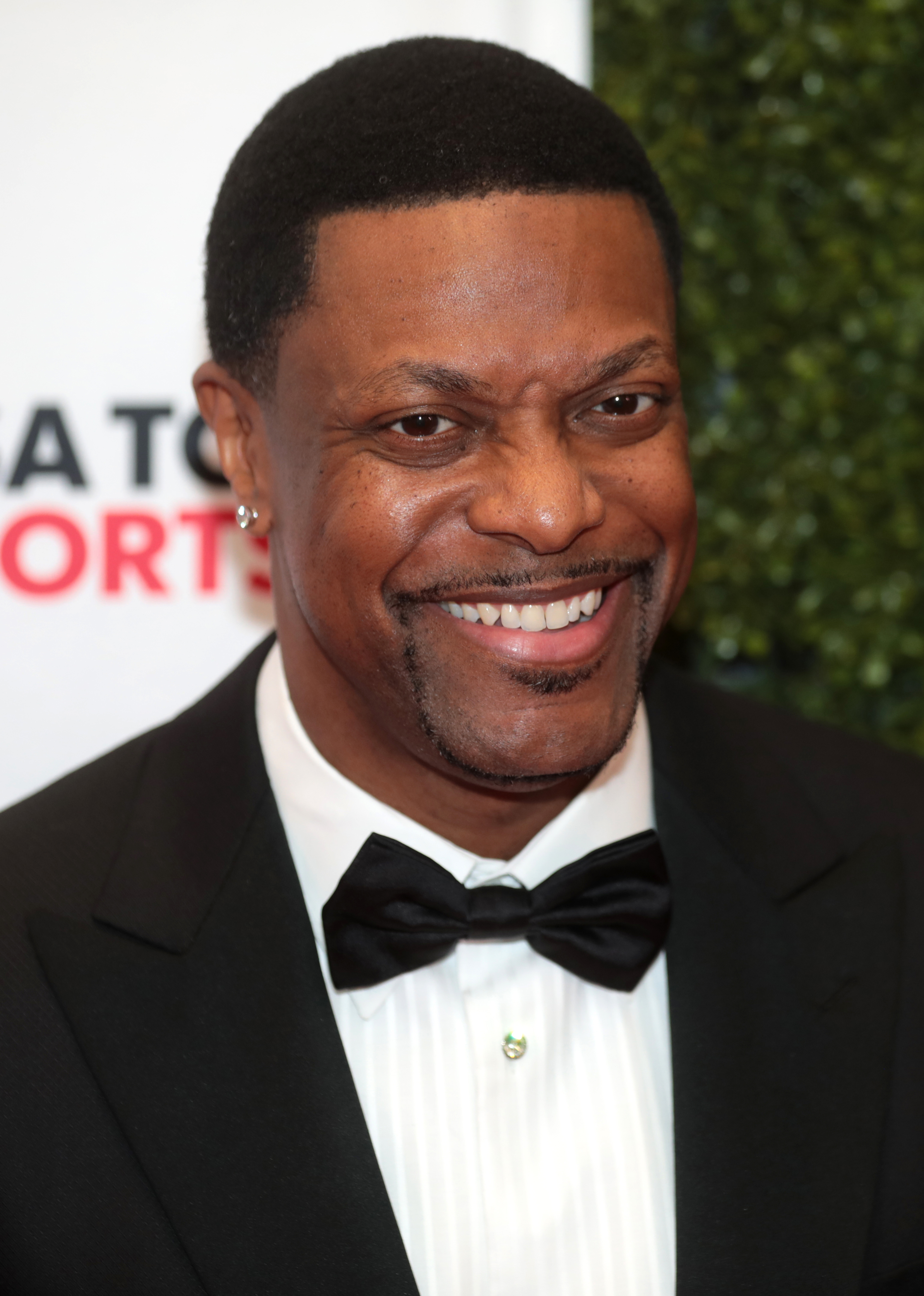
Chris Tucker

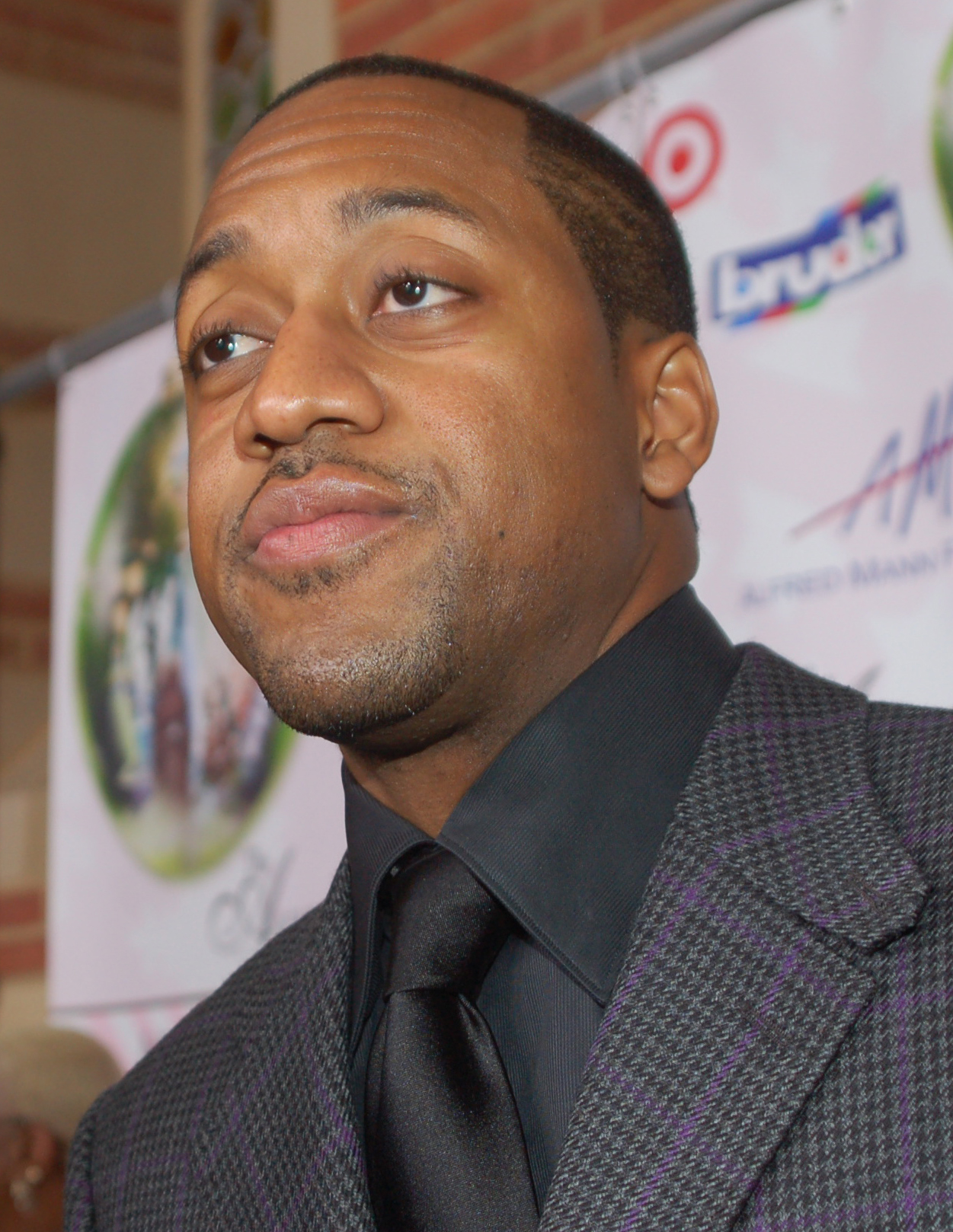
Jaleel White

- Aaliyah, singer, actress (d. 2001)
- Flex Alexander, actor
- Mahershala Ali, actor
- Anthony Anderson, actor
- Essence Atkins, actress
- Sharif Atkins, actor
- Joseph Awinongya, actor & Boxer
- Rochelle Aytes, actress
- Tyra Banks, actress, model
- Lamont Bentley, actor (d. 2005)
- Ahmed Best, actor, comedian and musician
- Big Gipp, rapper
- Stephen Bishop, actor
- De'Aundre Bonds, actor
- Bone Crusher, Hip Hop rapper
- Chadwick Boseman, actor (d. 2020)
- Wayne Brady, actor, comedian
- Golden Brooks, actress
- Cocoa Brown, actress
- Sterling K. Brown, actor
- Yvette Nicole Brown, actress
- Joy Bryant, actress
- Busta Rhymes, actor
- Wyatt Cenac, (African-American mother)
- Dave Chappelle, actor and comedian
- Chi-Ali, rapper
- Deon Cole, actor
- Mike Colter, actor
- Common, actor
- Laverne Cox, transgender actress
- D-Nice, actor
- Merle Dandridge, actress (African-American father)
- Taye Diggs, actor
- DMX, actor, rapper (d. 2021)
- Snoop Dogg, actor
- Omar Dorsey, actor
- Ava DuVernay, film director
- Michael Ealy, actor
- Nelsan Ellis, actor (d. 2017)
- Mike Epps, comedian and actor
- Omar Epps, actor
- Fat Joe, actor
- Keith Ferguson, voice actor
- Jaimee Foxworth, actress
- Ghostface Killah, rapper
- Tyrese Gibson, actor
- Lawrence Gilliard Jr., actor
- Omar Gooding, actor
- Kimberly Hébert Gregory, actress (d. 2025)
- Tiffany Haddish, actress
- Pooch Hall, actor
- Regina Hall, actress
- Cory Hardrict, actor
- Omari Hardwick, actor
- Kevin Hart, actor
- Darrin Henson, actor
- Taraji P. Henson, actress
- Taral Hicks, actress, singer
- Dulé Hill, actor and tap dancer
- André Holland, actor
- Russell Hornsby, actor
- Inspectah Deck, rapper
- Janelle James, comedian, actress, and writer
- Ja Rule, rapper
- Barry Jenkins, director, producer, screenwriter
- Dwayne Johnson, actor
- April Parker Jones, actress
- Jill Marie Jones, actress
- Rashida Jones, actress (African-American father)
- Richard T. Jones, actor
- Tamala Jones, actress
- Rhoda Jordan, actress
- Germany Kent, print and broadcast journalist, television personality, former beauty queen, actress, businesswoman, producer, philanthropist, and author
- Keegan-Michael Key, actor, comedian
- Khujo, rapper
- Killer Mike, rapper
- Regina King, actress
- Boris Kodjoe, actor
- Sanaa Lathan, actress
- Bianca Lawson, actress
- Sharon Leal, actress ( biological father was African-American )
- John Legend, singer, actor, producer
- Lil Jon, rapper
- Nia Long, actress
- Loni Love, comedienne
- Ludacris, actor/rapper
- Anthony Mackie, actor
- Vincent Mason (rapper), disc jockey and actor
- Darius McCrary, actor and singer
- Method Man, actor
- Windell Middlebrooks, actor (d. 2015)
- Omar Benson Miller, actor
- Wentworth Miller, actor
- Kel Mitchell, actor, comedian
- Shemar Moore, actor
- Ali Shaheed Muhammad, actor/musician
- Niecy Nash, actress
- Tariq Nasheed, film producer
- Nelly, rapper
- Brandy Norwood, actress
- Shaquille O'Neal, actor
- Nicole Ari Parker, actress
- Paula Patton (African-American father), actress
- Khary Payton, actor
- Pete Rock, disc jockey and Hip Hop producer
- Jordan Peele, actor, comedian, filmmaker (African-American father)
- Mekhi Phifer, actor
- Q-Tip, actor and Hip Hop producer
- Questlove, disc jockey and Hip Hop producer
- Queen Latifah, rapper, actress
- Raekwon, rapper
- Corey Reynolds, actor
- Lauren Ridloff, actress
- Leonard Roberts, actor
- Bumper Robinson, actor
- Craig Robinson, actor, comedian
- Anika Noni Rose, actress
- Tracee Ellis Ross, actress, model, comedian (African-American mother)
- Maya Rudolph, actress (African-American mother)
- Zoe Saldaña, actress
- Sherri Saum, actress (African-American father)
- Tupac Shakur, actor, rapper (d. 1996)
- Shanice, singer
- Keesha Sharp, actress
- Beanie Sigel, rapper
- Henry Simmons, actor
- IronE Singleton, actor
- Sisqo, rapper singer
- Jada Pinkett Smith, actress, singer-songwriter
- Octavia Spencer, actress
- Larenz Tate, actor
- The Game, rapper
- Charlize Theron, actress
- Kenan Thompson, actor, comedian
- T-Mo, rapper
- Tony Yayo, actor
- Treach, rapper
- Chris Tucker, actor, comedian
- Usher, actor, singer
- Vin Rock, rapper
- Vincent M. Ward, actor
- Malcolm-Jamal Warner, actor (d. 2025)
- Kerry Washington, actress
- Marlon Wayans, actor, comedian, screenwriter and producer
- Shawn Wayans, actor, comedian, writer, producer
- Rutina Wesley, actress
- Jaleel White, actor, comedian
- Charles Malik Whitfield, actor
- Kellie Shanygne Williams, actress
- Cedric Yarbrough, comedian
- Zakiya Young
- Yo-Yo, rapper
- Bokeem Woodbine, actor

== Born in the 1960s ==
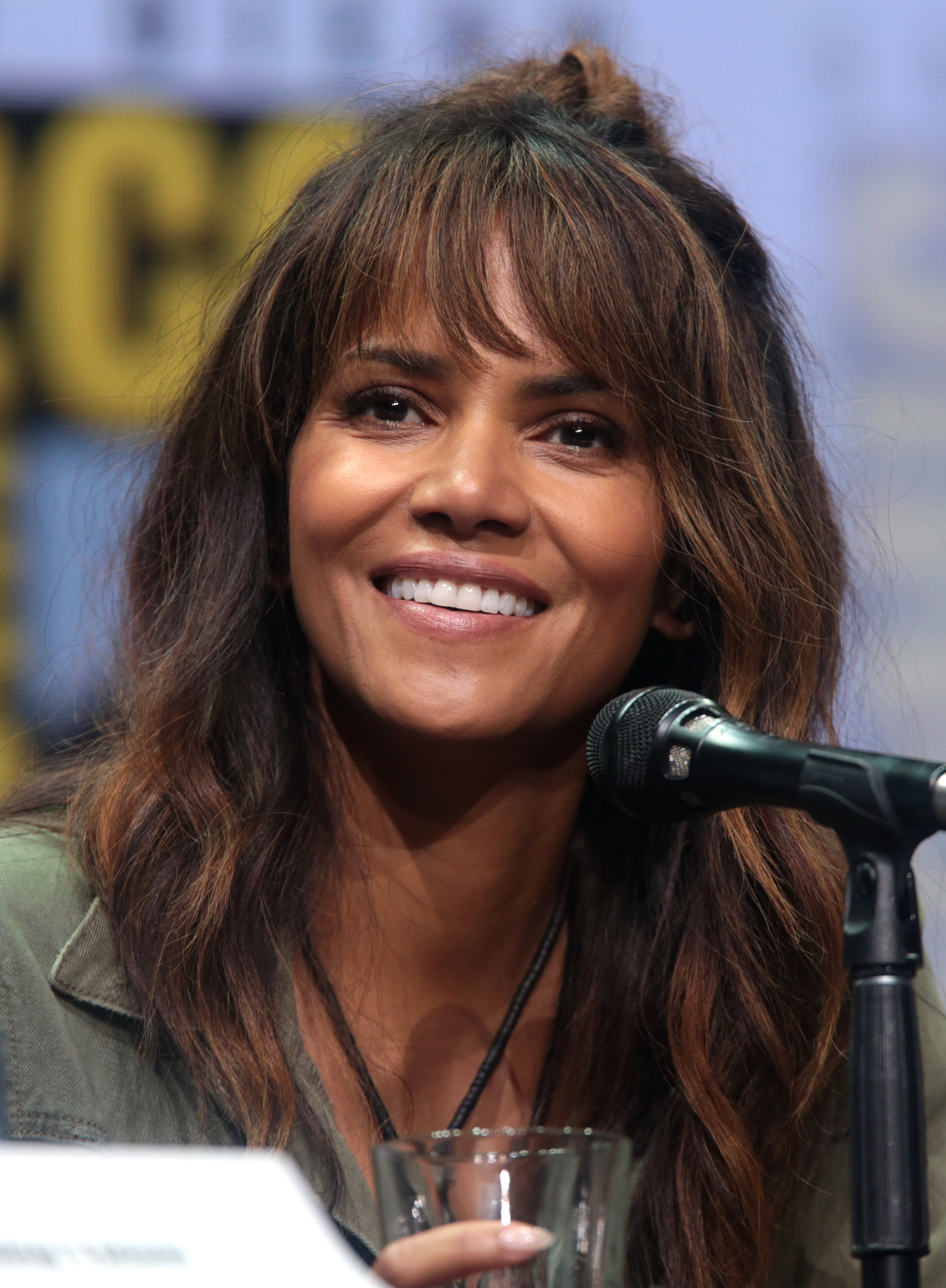
Halle Berry

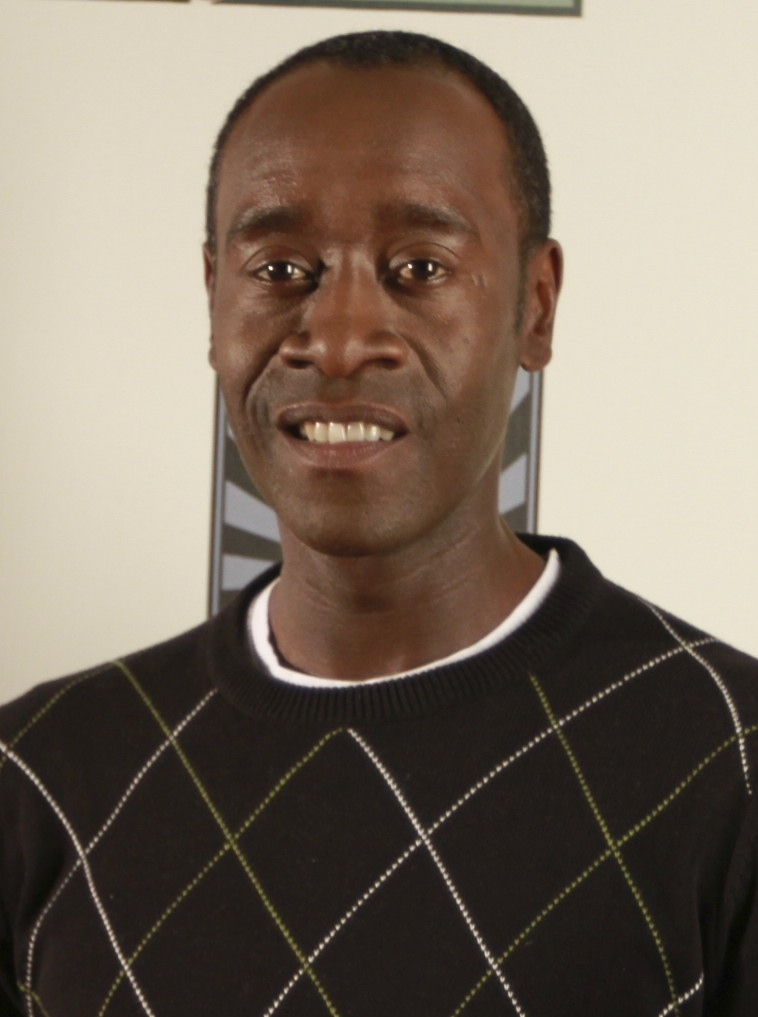
Don Cheadle

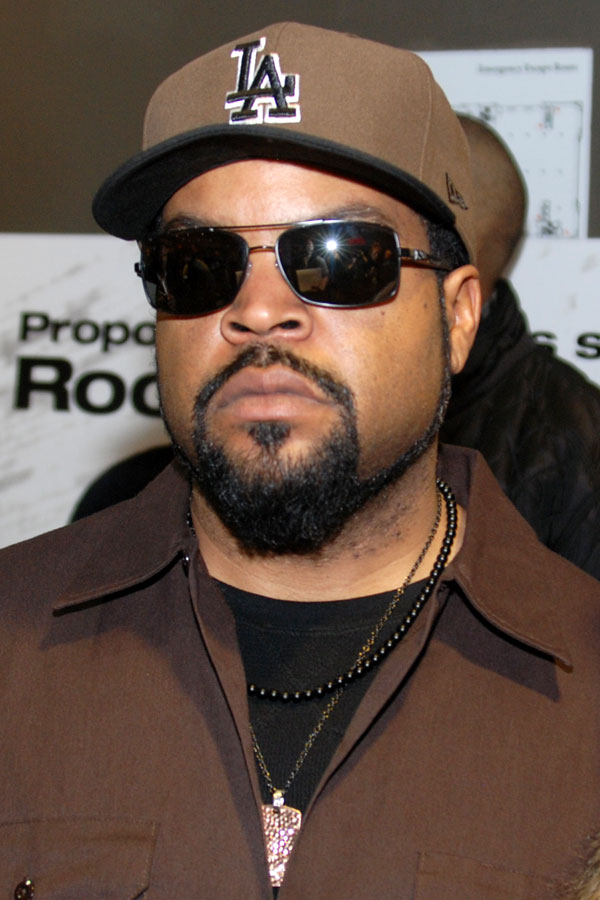
Ice Cube

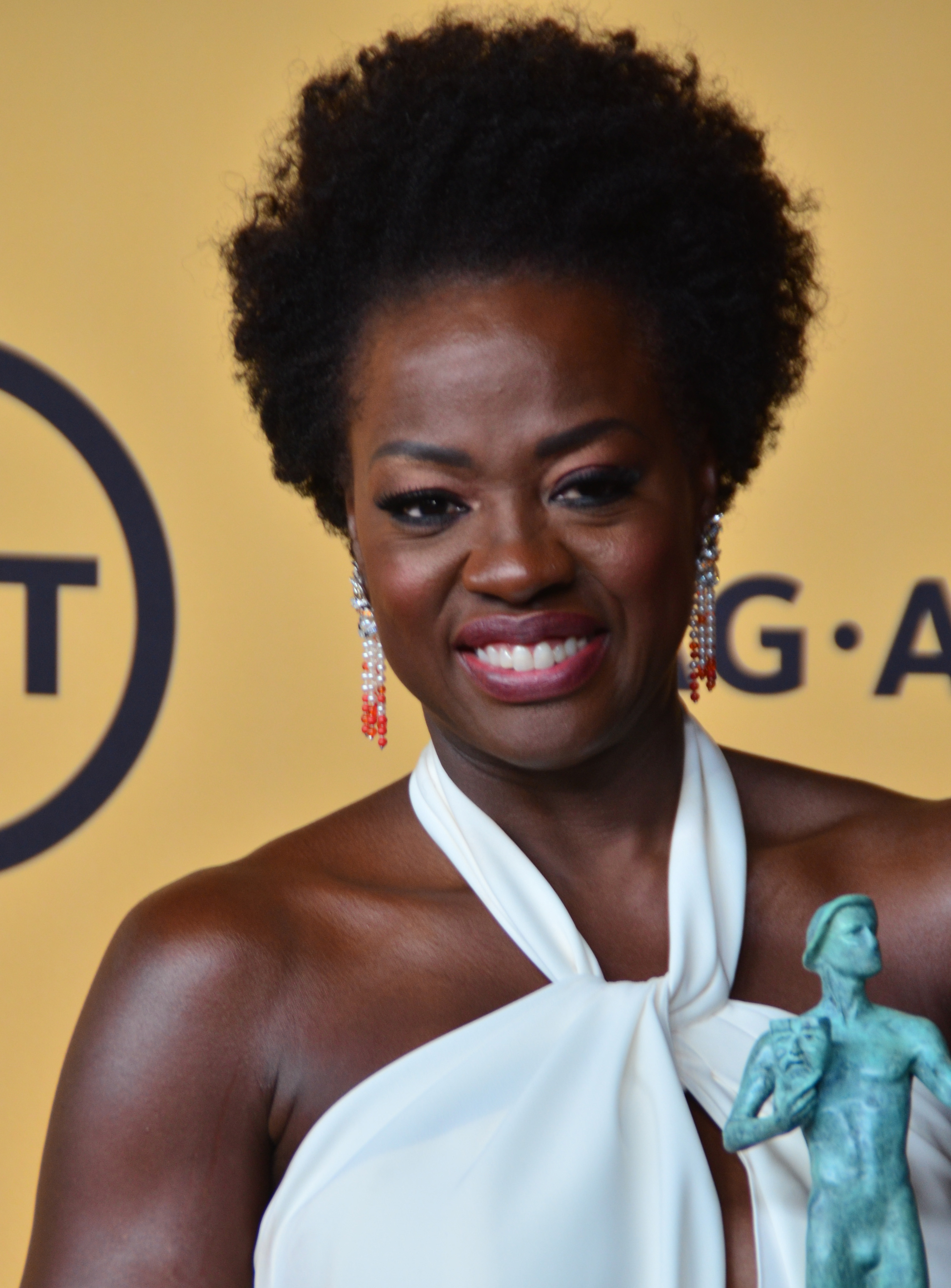
Viola Davis

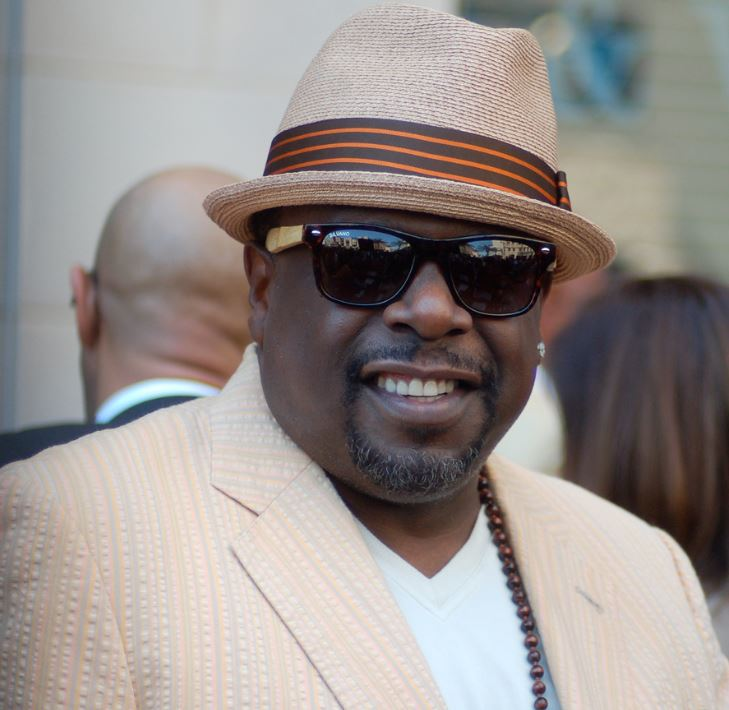
Cedric the Entertainer

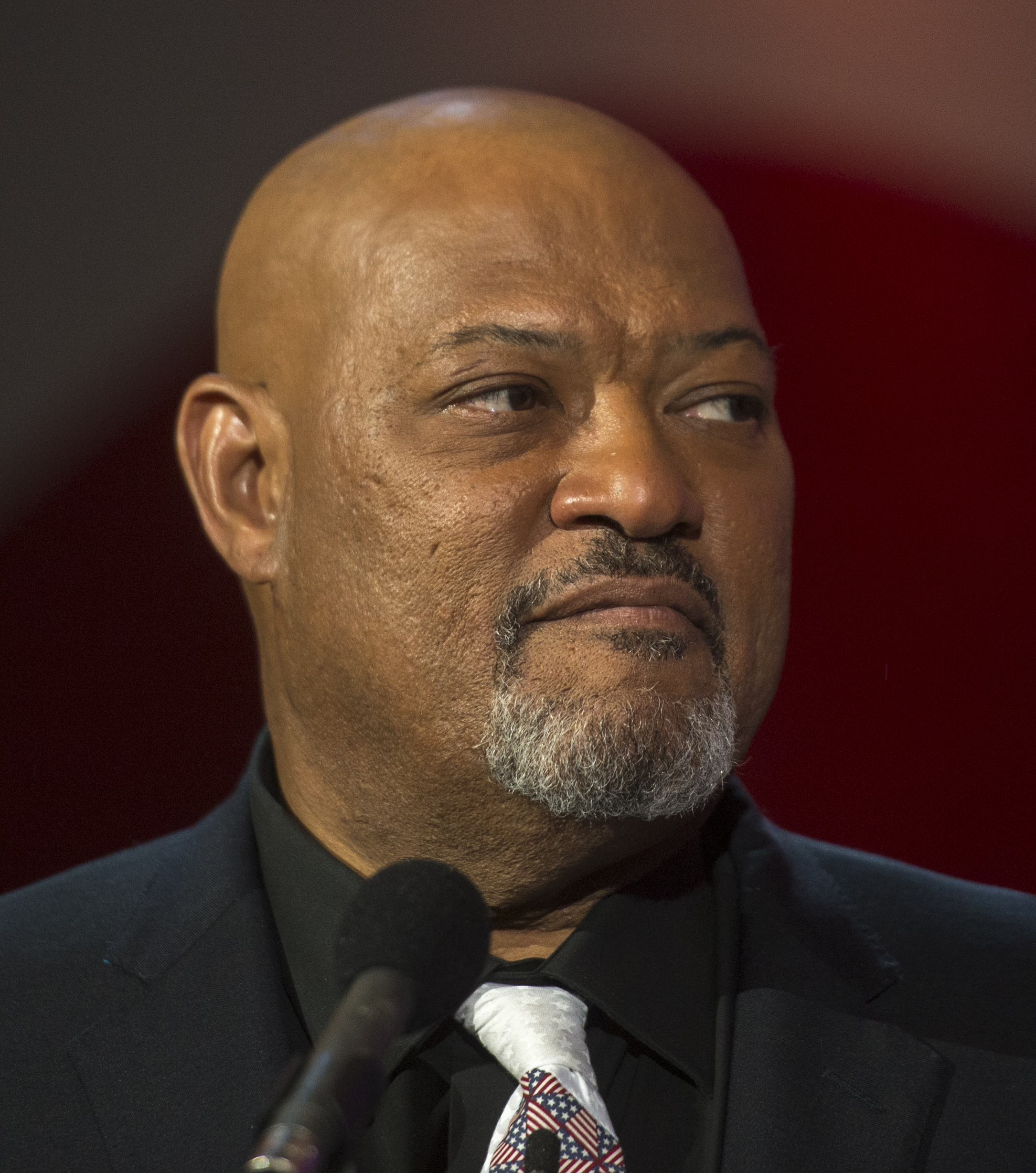
Laurence Fishburne

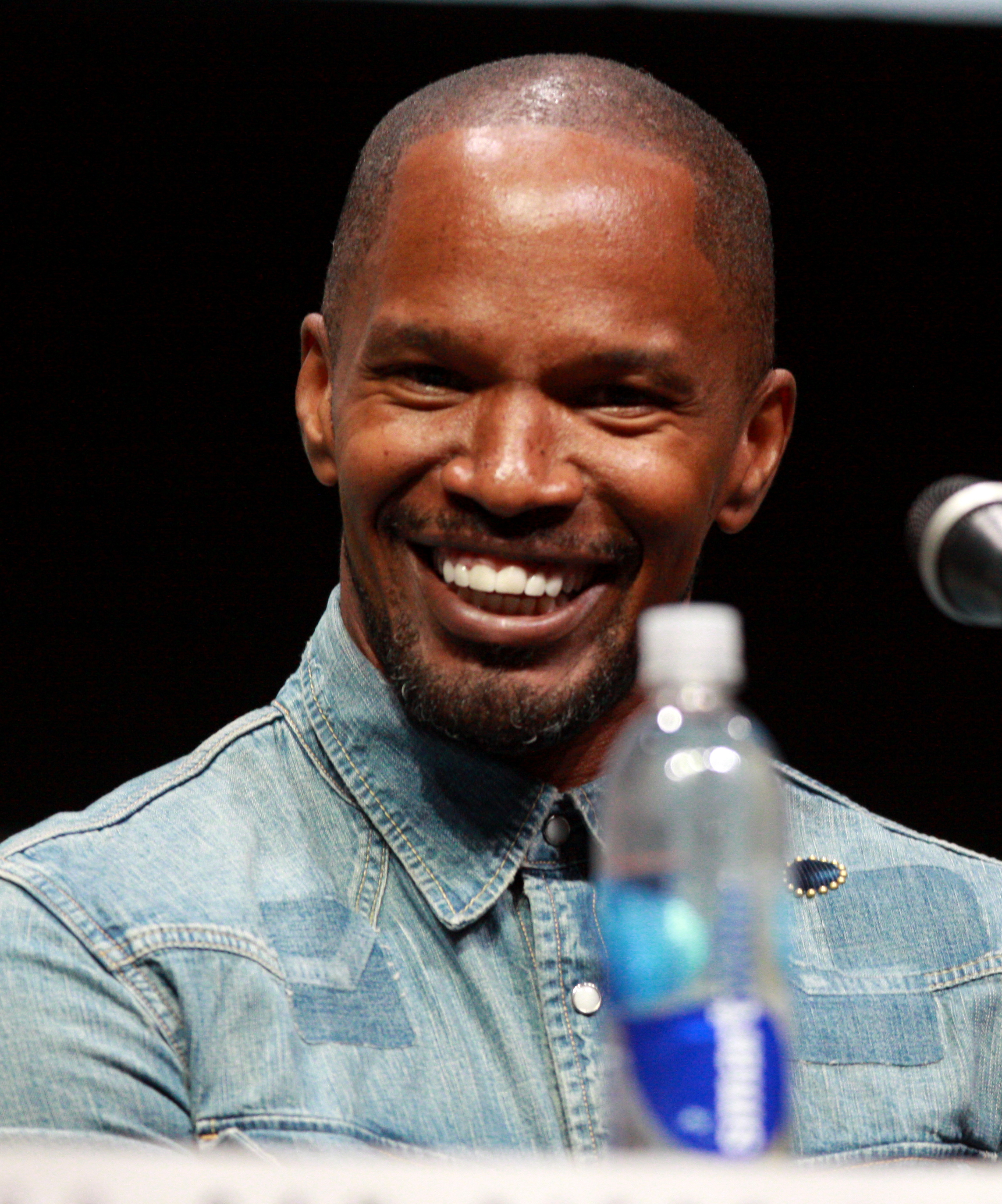
Jamie Foxx

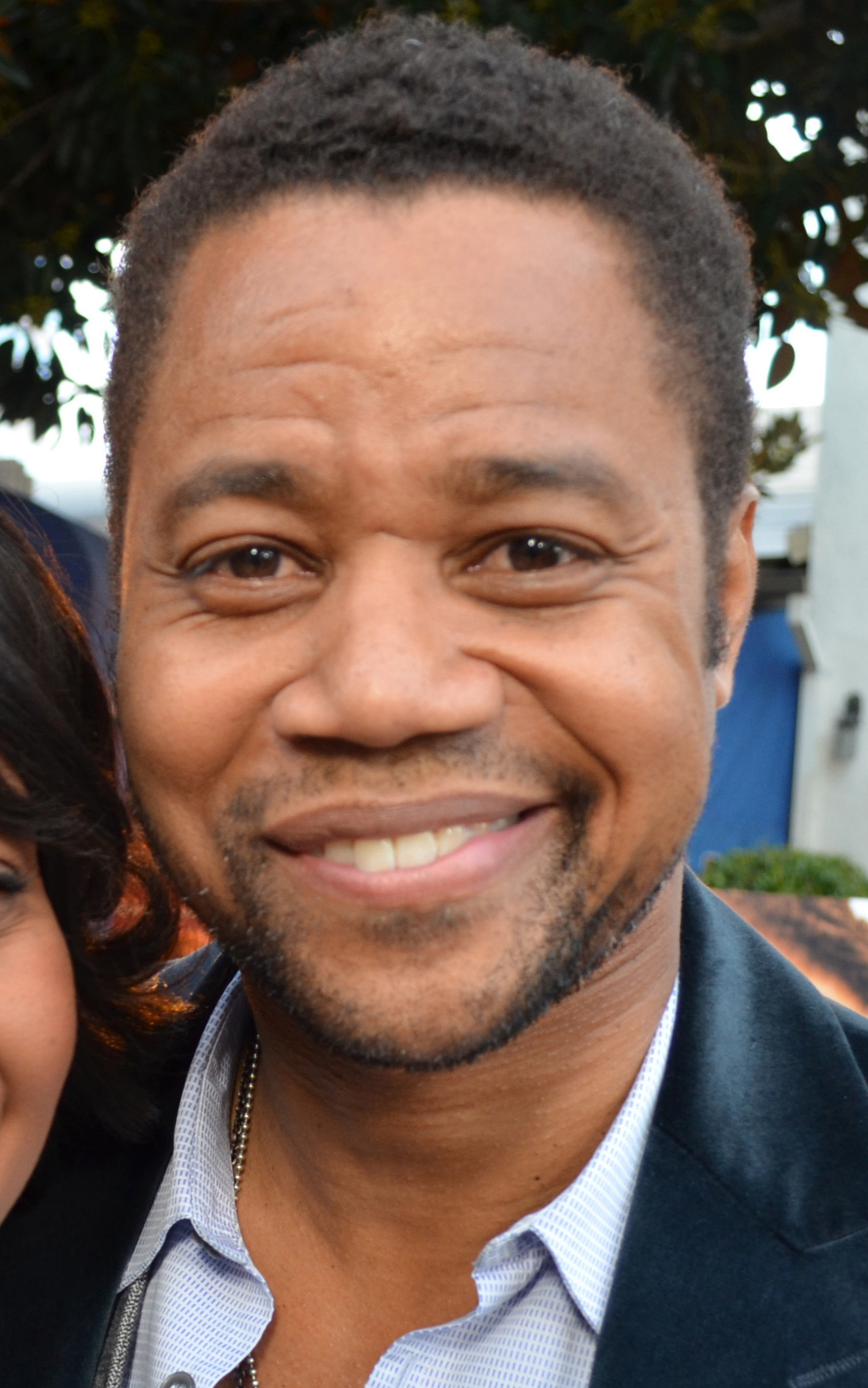
Cuba Gooding Jr.

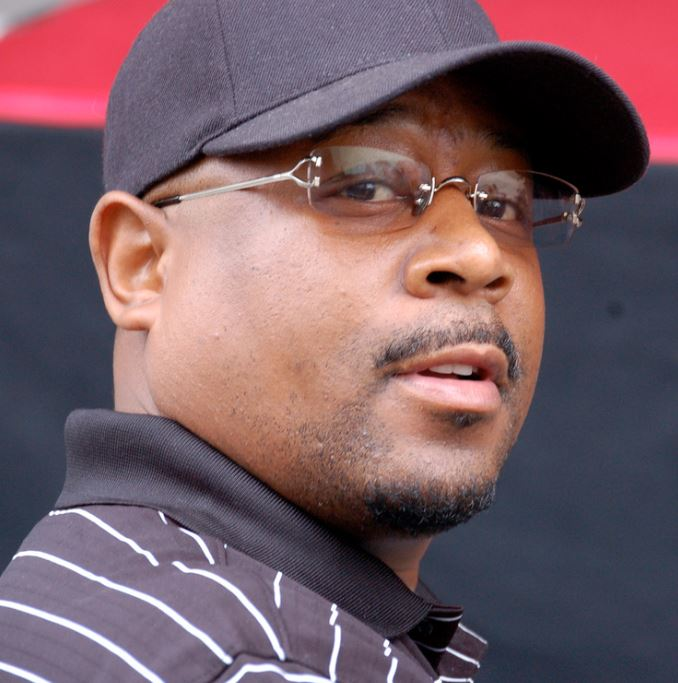
Martin Lawrence

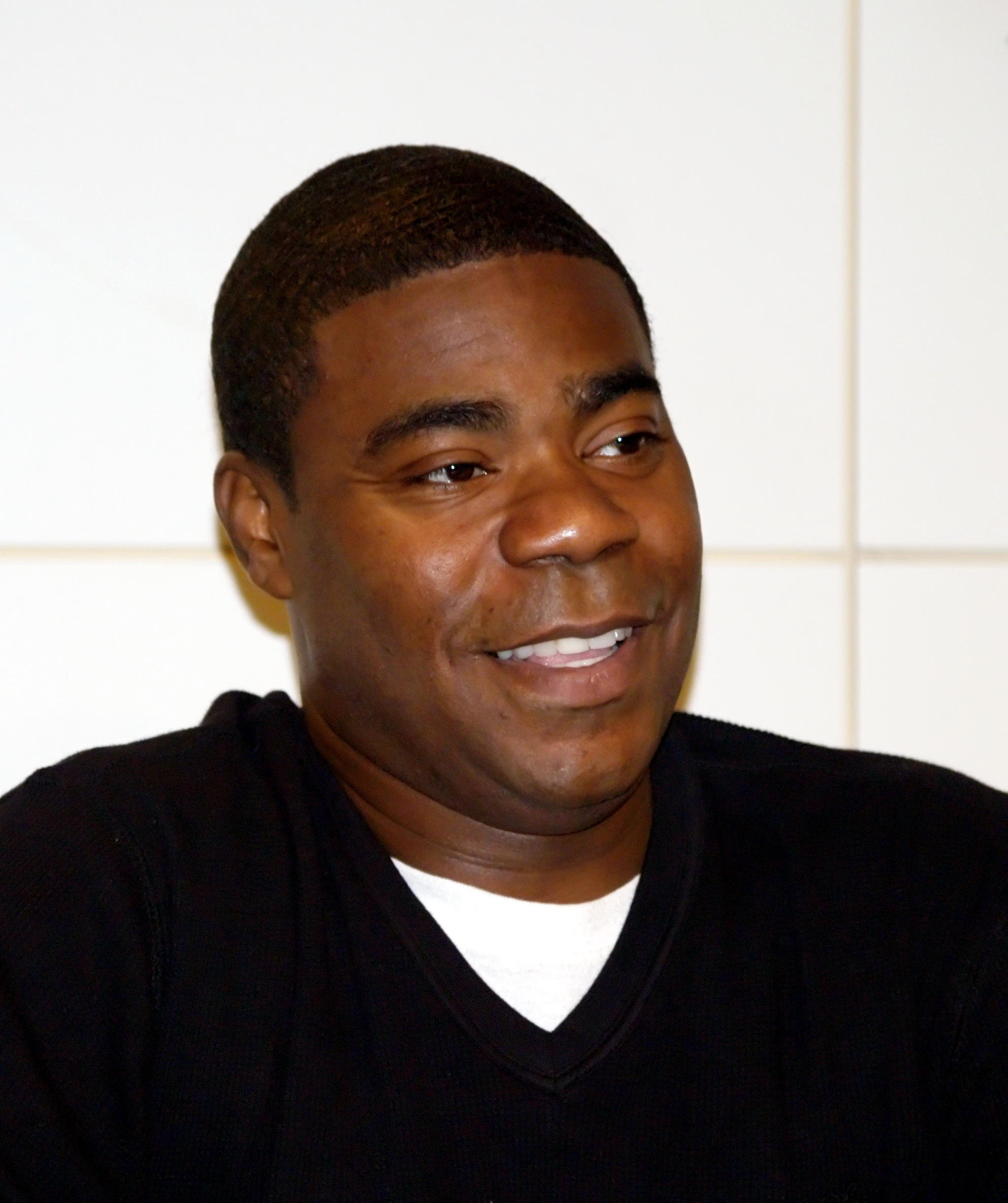
Tracy Morgan

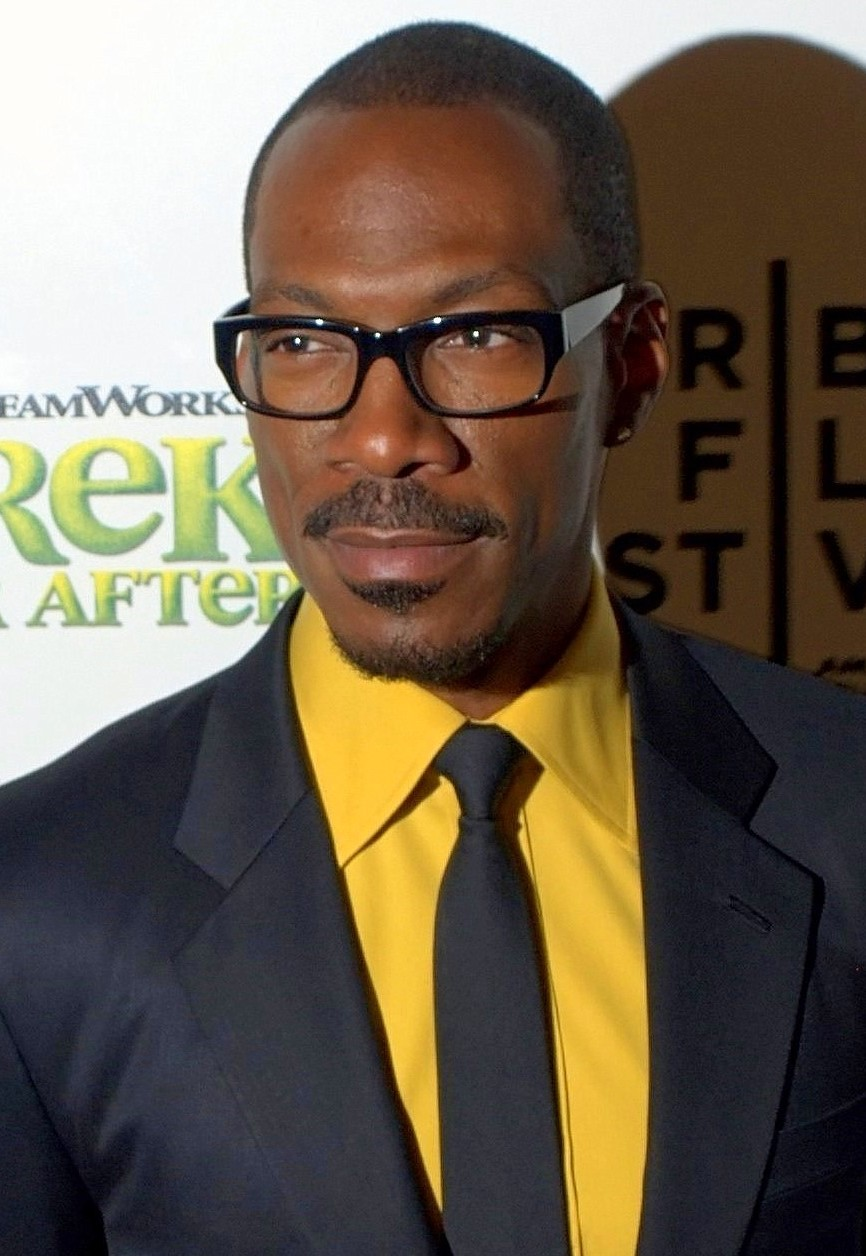
Eddie Murphy

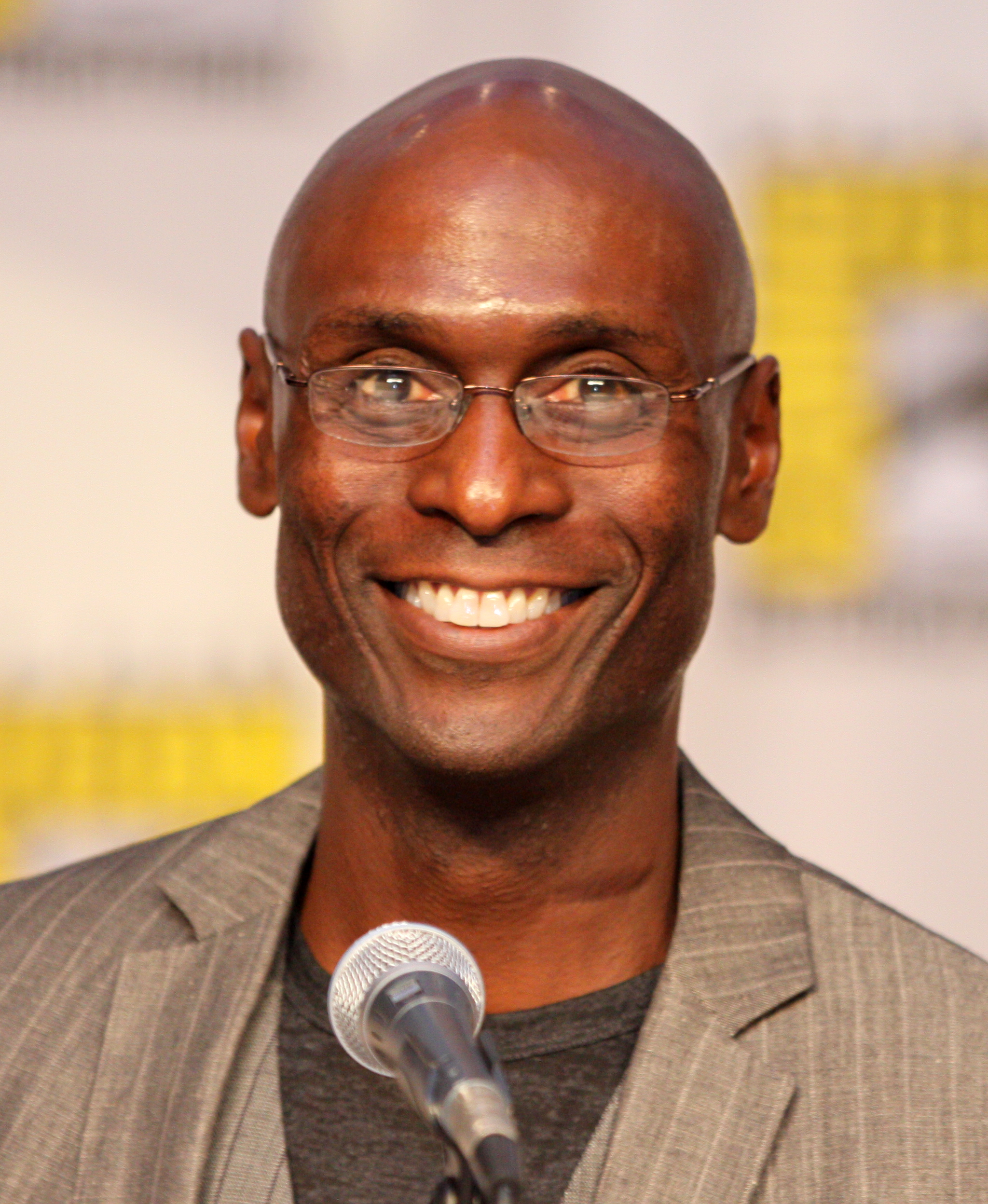
Lance Reddick

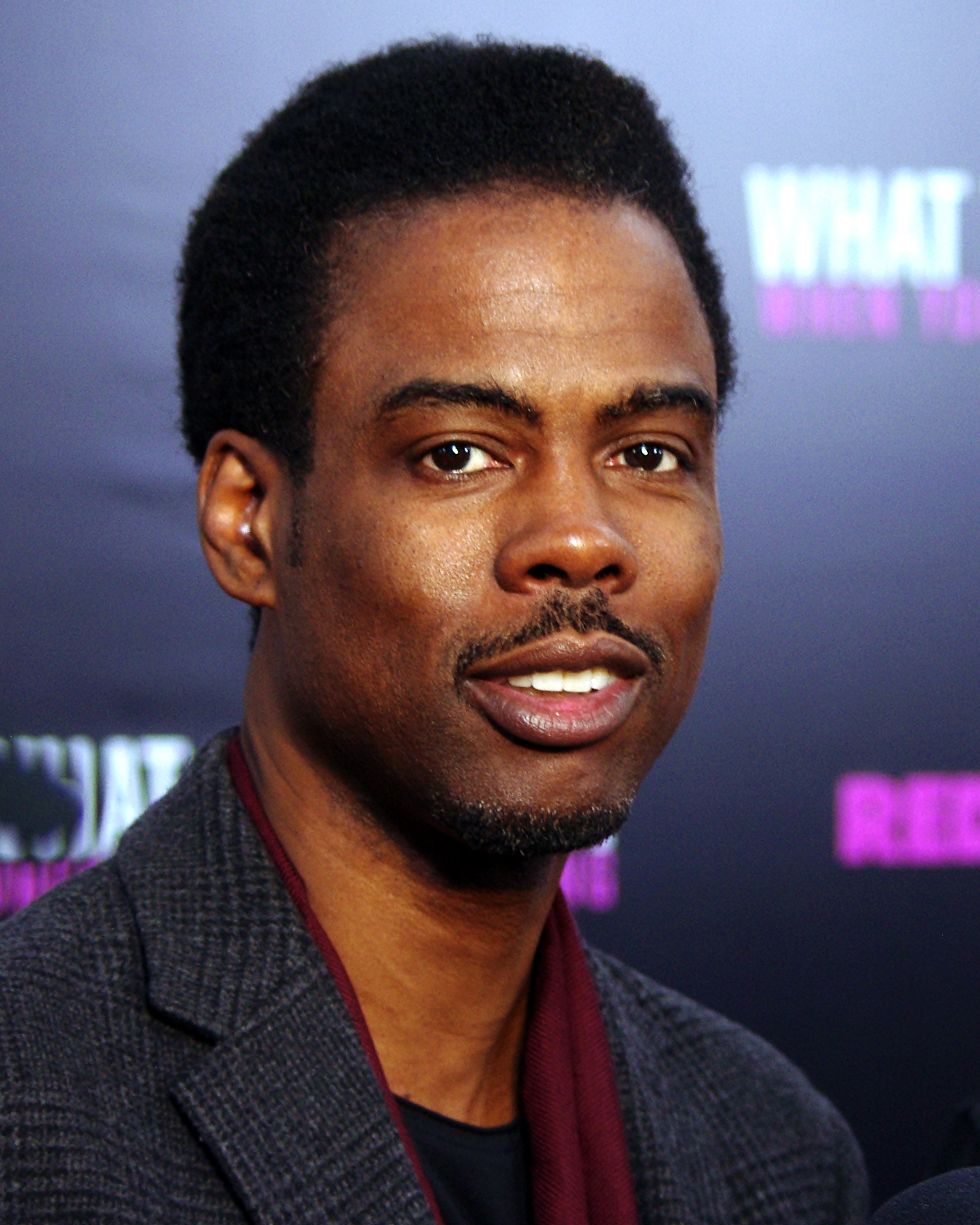
Chris Rock

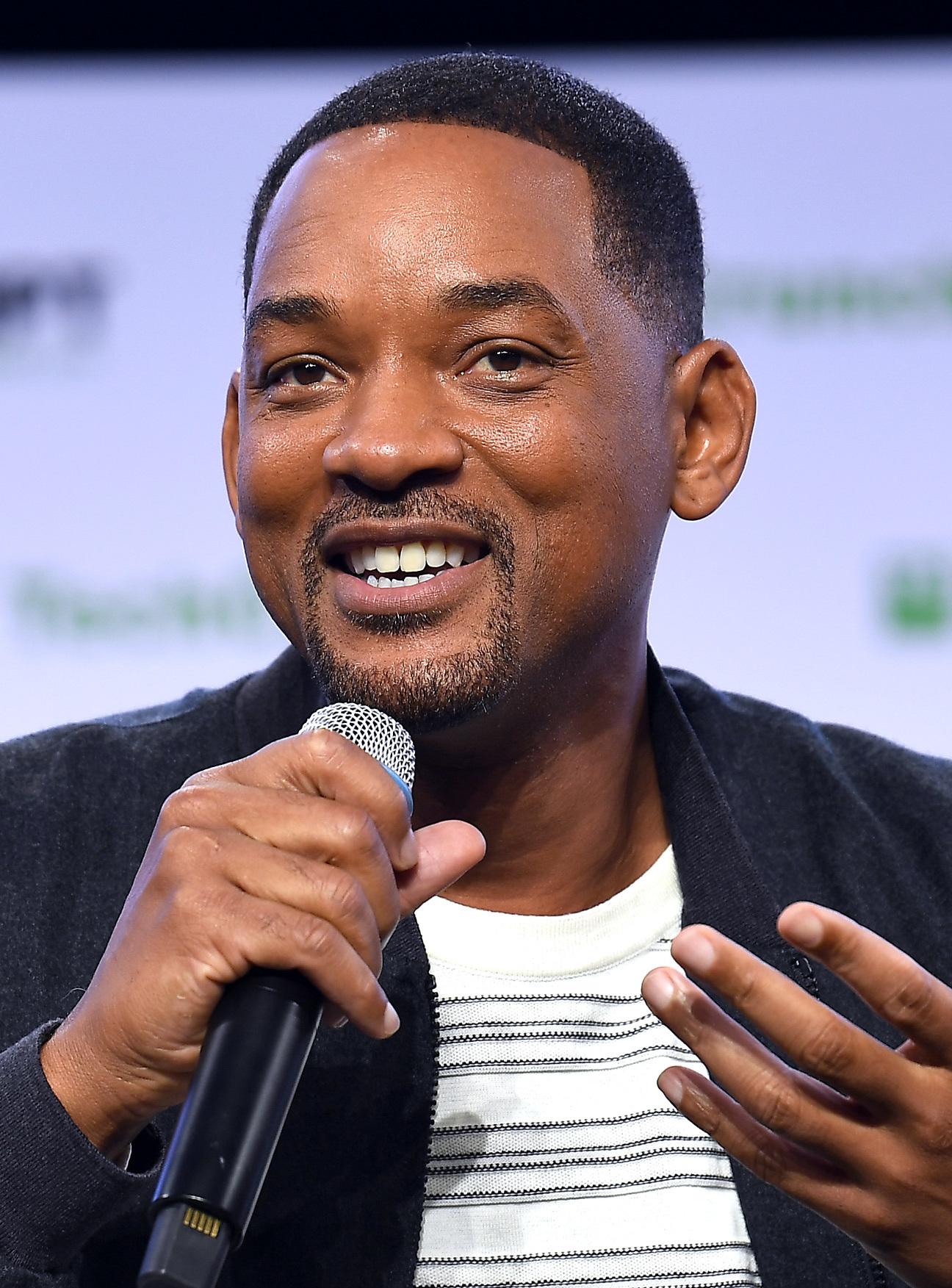
Will Smith

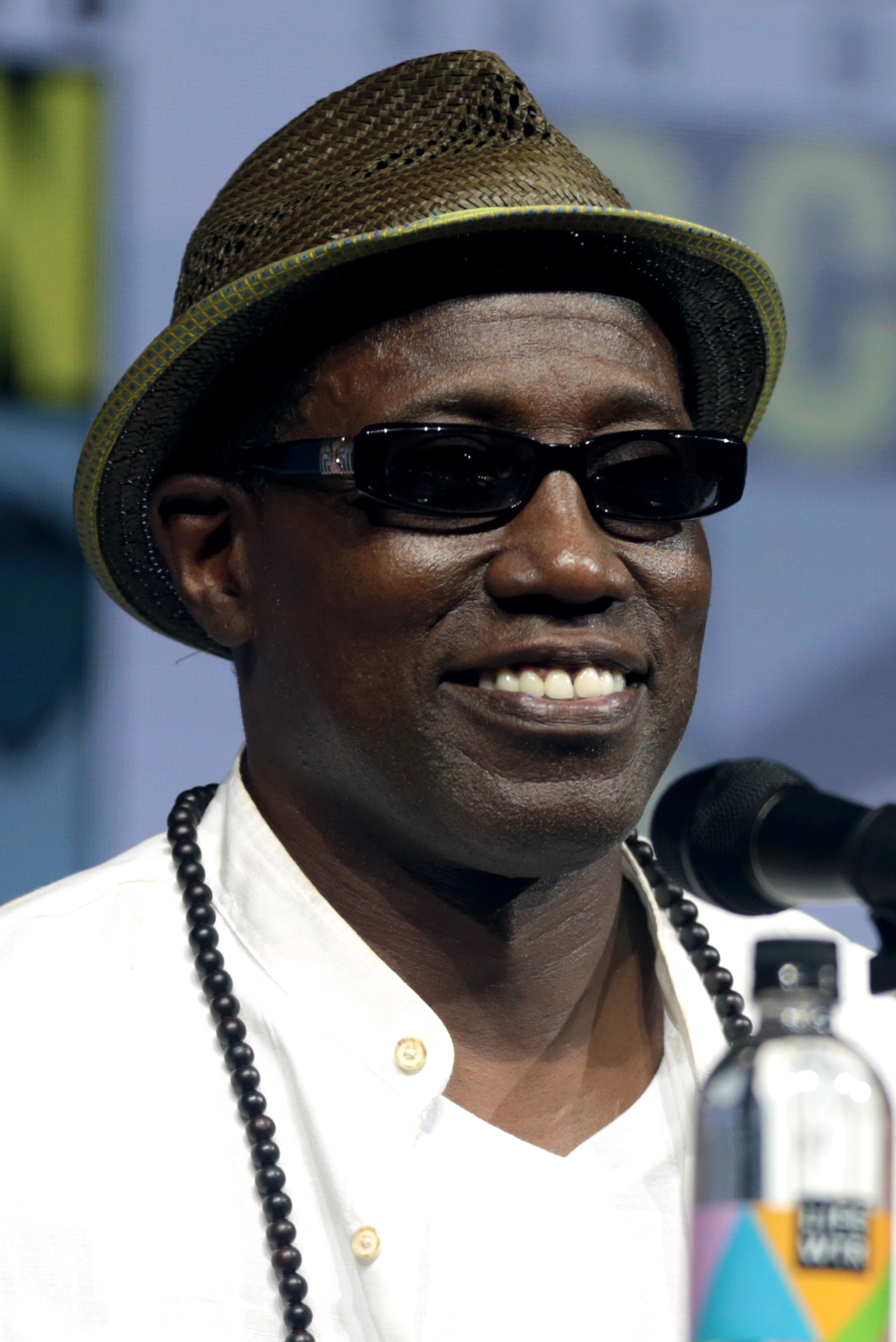
Wesley Snipes

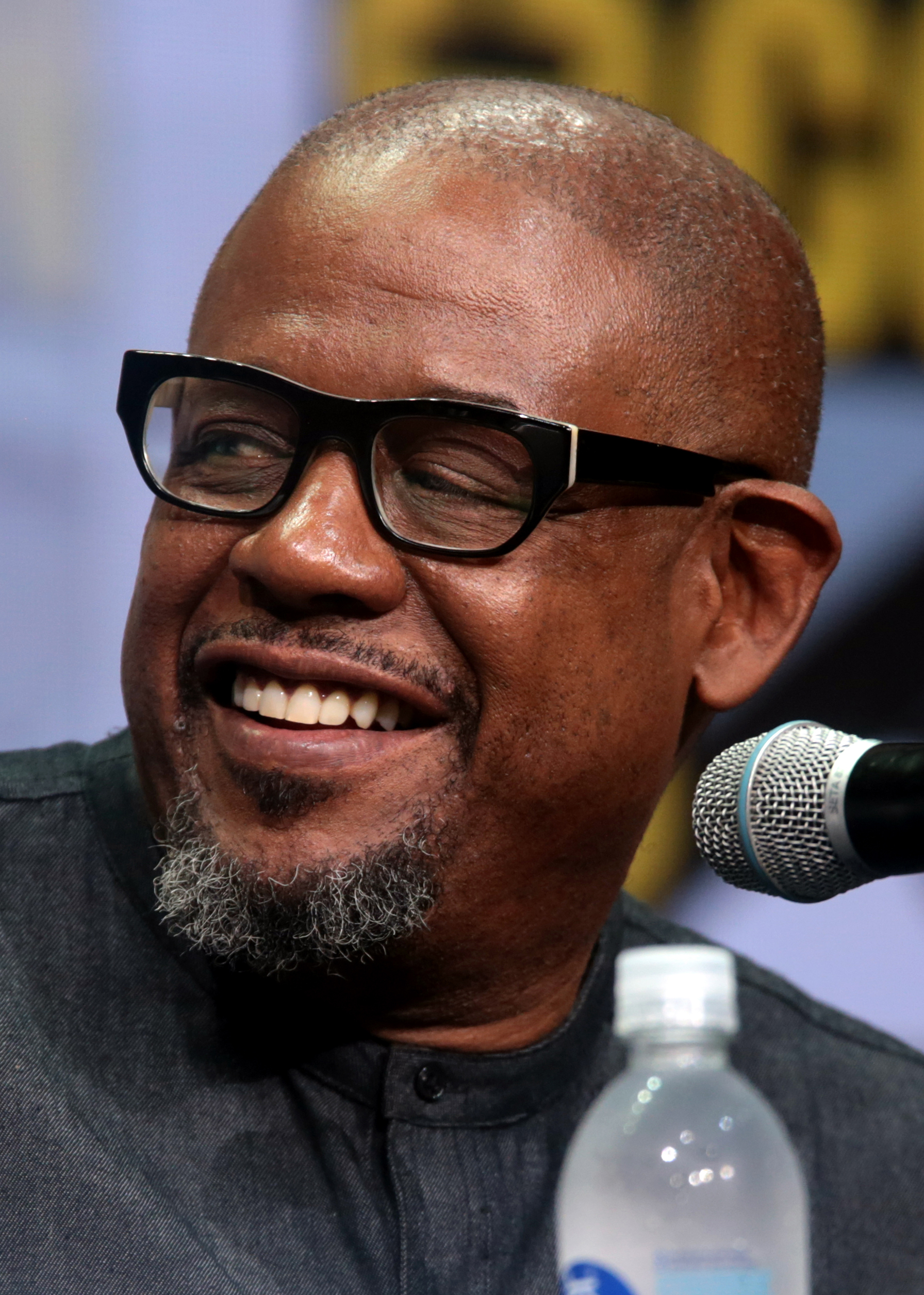
Forest Whitaker

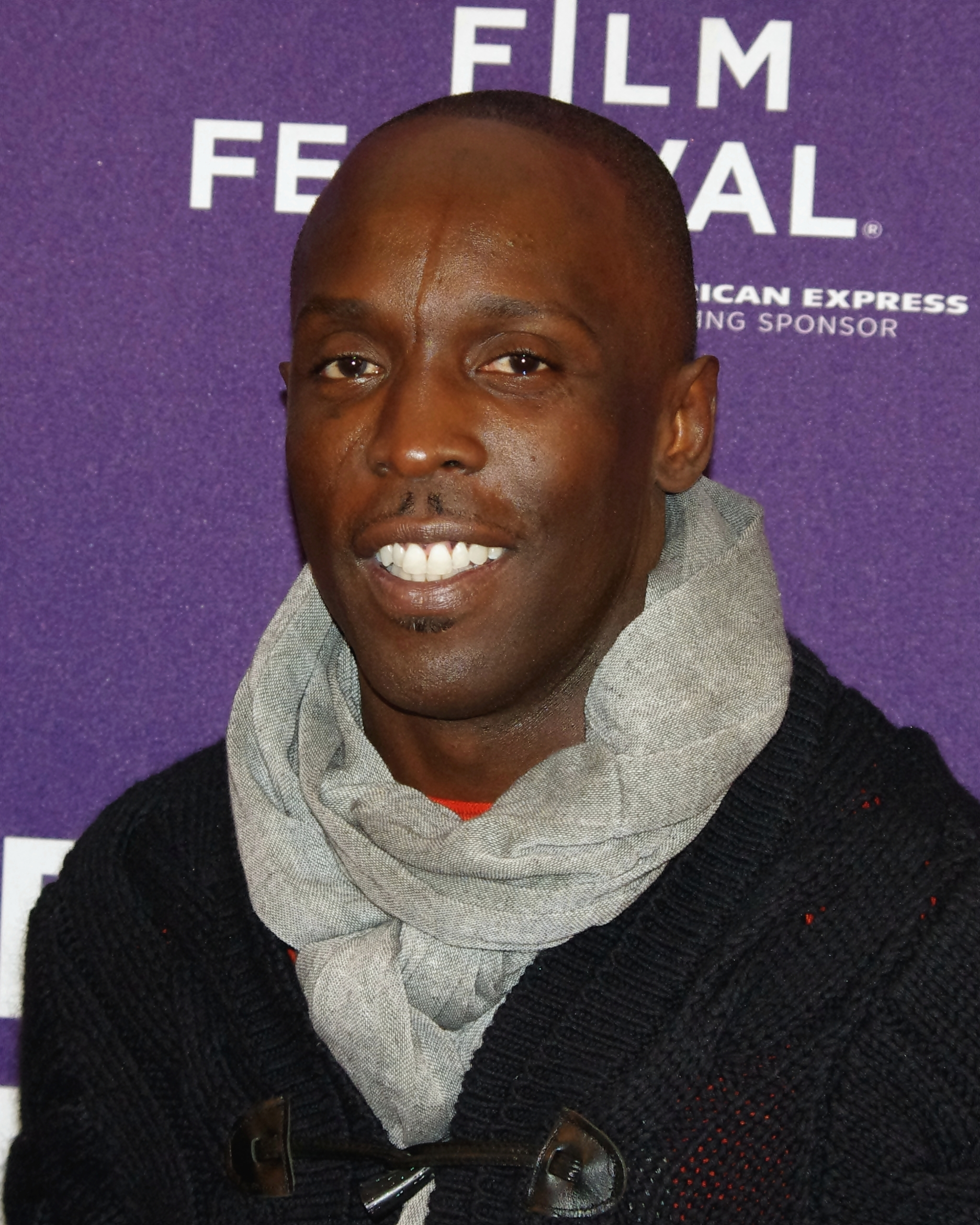
Michael K. Williams

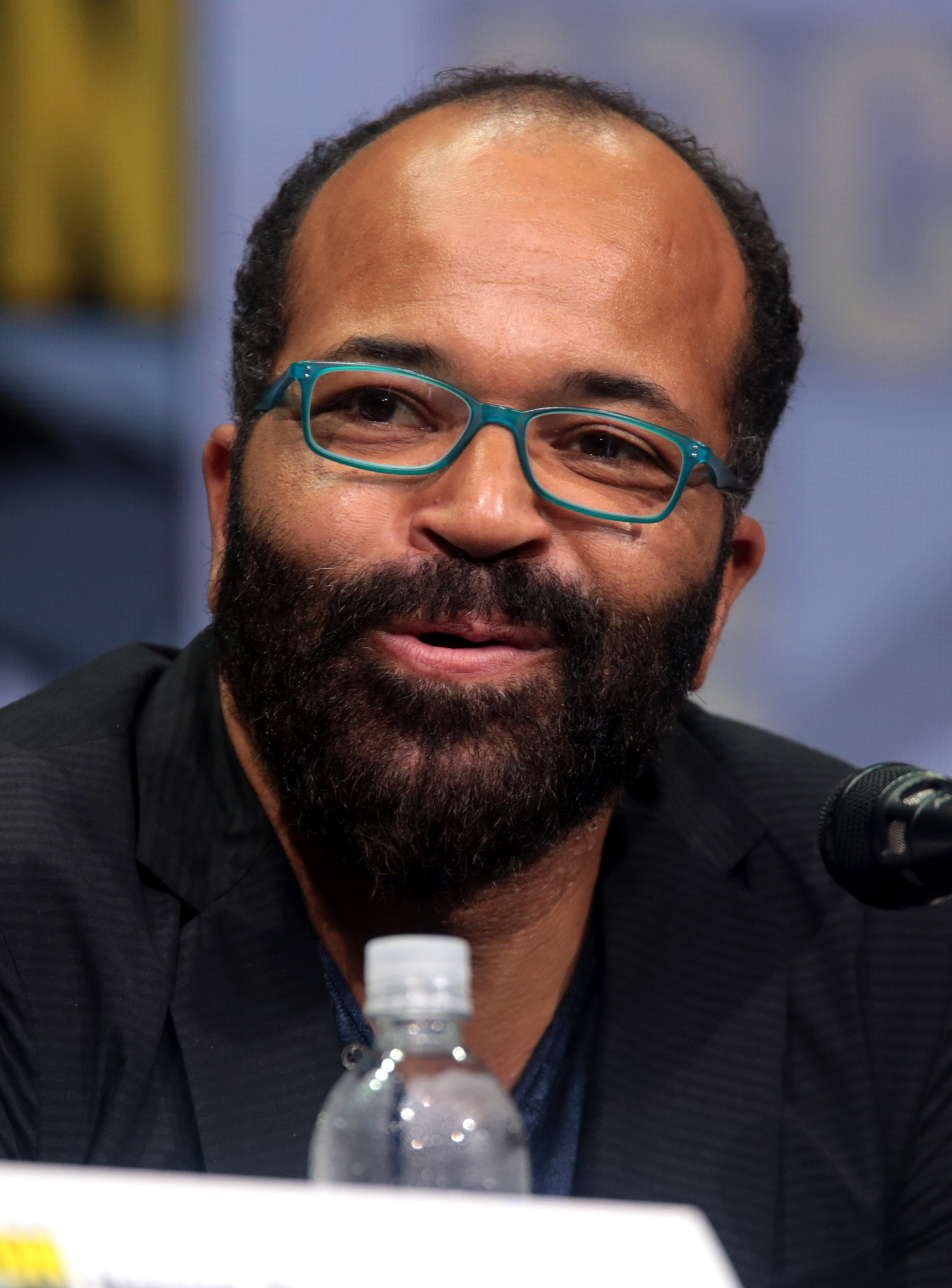
Jeffrey Wright

- Tichina Arnold, actress
- Michael Beach, actor
- Jennifer Beals (African-American father), actress
- Darryl M. Bell, actor
- Halle Berry, actress
- Richard Biggs, actor (d. 2004)
- Big Daddy Kane, rapper
- Birdman, rapper
- Sean Blakemore, actor
- Michael Boatman, actor and sitcom comedian
- Lisa Bonet (African-American father), actress
- Andre Braugher, actor (d. 2023)
- Toni Braxton, singer
- Todd Bridges, actor
- Richard Brooks, actor
- Frances Callier, actress
- Mariah Carey, (African-American father) actress
- Rocky Carroll, actor
- Cedric the Entertainer, actor and comedian
- Don Cheadle, actor
- Morris Chestnut, actor
- CL Smooth, rapper
- Chad L. Coleman, actor
- Gary Coleman, actor, comedian (d. 2010)
- Kim Coles, actress
- Sean Combs, actor
- Lavell Crawford, actor and comedian
- Rusty Cundieff, actor
- Mark Curry, actor
- Danny Boy, rapper
- Stacey Dash (African-American father), actress
- Tommy Davidson, actor
- Cassi Davis, actress
- LaVan Davis, actor
- Viola Davis, actress
- Deezer D, actor, rapper (d. 2021)
- DJ Kay Gee, rapper
- DJ Yella, disc jockey and rapper
- Natalie Desselle-Reid, actress (d. 2020)
- Nate Dogg, actor (d. 2011)
- Colman Domingo (African-American mother), actor
- Doug E. Fresh (Brazilian-African-American sister), beatboxer and rapper
- Gary Dourdan, actor
- Dr. Dre, actor
- Dres, rapper
- E-40, actor
- Eric B., actor
- Sonya Eddy, actress (d. 2022)
- Kim Fields, actress
- Laurence Fishburne, actor
- Freddie Foxxx, actor
- Thomas Mikal Ford, actor, comedian (d. 2016)
- Vivica A. Fox, actress
- Jamie Foxx, actor
- Johnny Gill, singer
- Seth Gilliam, actor
- Robin Givens, actress
- Cuba Gooding Jr., actor
- Grand Puba, rapper
- Eddie Griffin, actor
- Jasmine Guy, actress
- GZA, rapper
- Kadeem Hardison, actor, director
- Hill Harper, actor
- D'atra Hicks, actress, singer
- Whitney Houston, actress (d. 2012)
- Terrance Howard, actor
- D.L. Hughley, comedian, actor
- Ice Cube, actor
- Janet Jackson, actress and singer
- Jay-Z, rapper
- Kristoff St. John, actor (d. 2019)
- A.J. Johnson (d. 2021)
- Anne-Marie Johnson, actress
- David Jude Jolicoeur, actor (d. 2023)
- Orlando Jones, actor
- Roy Jones Jr., actor
- R. Kelly, former singer and actor
- Kidd Creole, rapper
- Kool G Rap, rapper
- Lenny Kravitz, actor
- KRS-One, actor
- Phil LaMarr, actor, comedian
- Martin Lawrence, actor, comedian
- Scott Lawrence, actor
- Harry Lennix (African-American mother), actor
- Dawnn Lewis (with Caribbean blood), actress
- Kecia Lewis, singer and actress
- Phill Lewis, actor, comedian
- Tina Lifford, actress
- LL Cool J, actor
- Lord Jamar, actor
- Faizon Love, actor and comedian
- Ed Lover, rapper and actor
- David Mann, actor
- Tamela Mann, actress
- Mannie Fresh, Hip Hop producer
- Jesse L. Martin, actor
- Tisha Campbell-Martin, actress
- Masta Killa, rapper
- Chi McBride, actor
- Darryl McDaniels, actor
- Brian McKnight, singer
- Tim Meadows, actor
- Melle Mel, actor and rapper
- Kelvin Mercer, rapper and actor
- Daryl Mitchell, actor
- Tracy Morgan, actor
- Phil Moore, actor and TV host
- Eddie Murphy, actor and comedian
- Haywood Nelson, actor
- Patrice O'Neal, actor and comedian (d. 2011)
- John Paris, singer
- Carl Anthony Payne II, actor
- Allen Payne, actor
- Holly Robinson Peete, actress
- Tyler Perry, actor, comedian, filmmaker
- Wendell Pierce, actor
- Glenn Plummer, actor
- Gina Ravera (part African-American descent) actress
- Donnell Rawlings, comedian
- Gene Anthony Ray, actor (d. 2003)
- Lance Reddick, actor (d. 2023)
- Rakim, rapper
- Kevin Michael Richardson, actor
- Leon Robinson, actor
- Chris Rock, actor and comedian
- Andre Royo, actor
- RuPaul, actor
- RZA, actor
- Sadat X, rapper
- Sherri Shepherd, actress and comedian
- Joseph Simmons, actor
- John Singleton, director, producer, screenwriter (d. 2019)
- Isaac C. Singleton Jr., actor
- Slick Rick, rapper, actor and beatboxer
- Will Smith, actor and rapper
- J. B. Smoove, actor and comedian
- Wesley Snipes, actor
- Sonja Sohn (African-American father), actress and director
- Danielle Spencer, actress (d. 2025)
- Wanda Sykes, actress and comedian
- Michelle Thomas, actress, comedian (d. 1998)
- Tone-Loc, rapper, actor
- Blair Underwood, actor
- Sheryl Underwood, actress, comedian
- Courtney B. Vance, actor
- Isaiah Washington, actor
- Damon Wayans, comedian, actor, writer and producer
- Forest Whitaker, actor
- Michael Jai White, actor and martial artist
- Eugene Wilde, singer
- Gary Anthony Williams, actor
- Michael K. Williams, actor (d. 2021)
- Chris Williams, actor
- Vanessa Williams, actress
- Larry Wilmore, actor and comedian
- Debra Wilson, voice actress
- Reno Wilson, actor and comedian
- Yvette Wilson, actress and comedian (d. 2012)
- Jeffrey Wright, actor
- Malik Yoba, actor

== Born in the 1950s ==
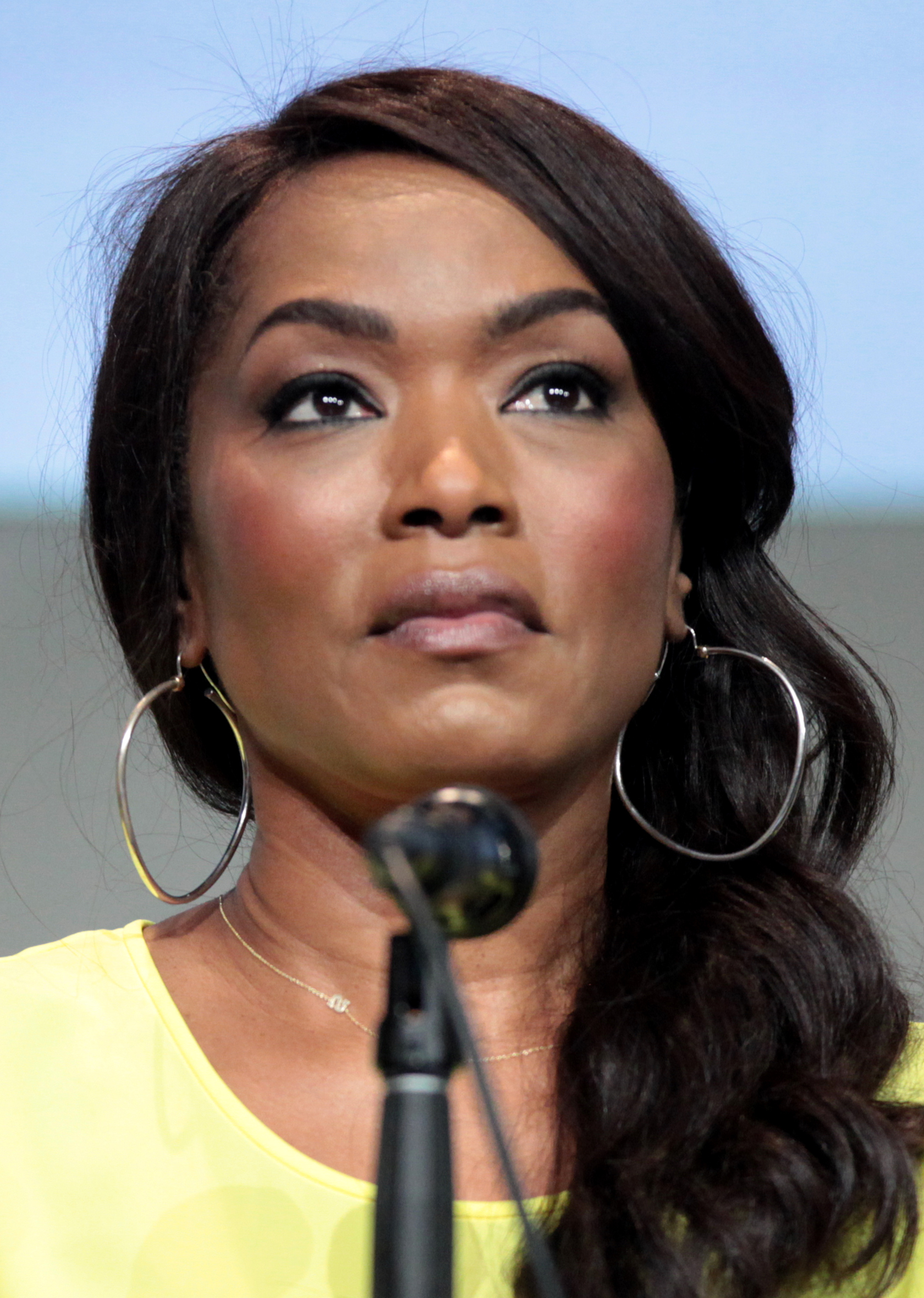
Angela Bassett

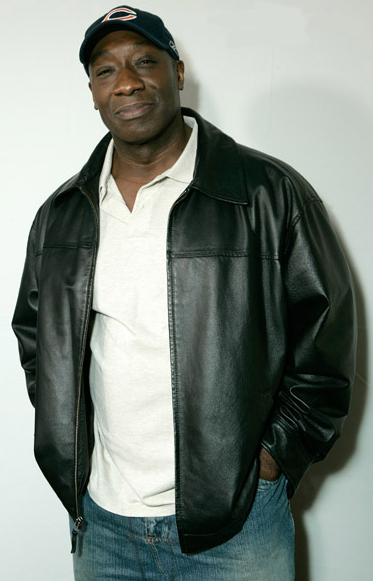
Michael Clarke Duncan

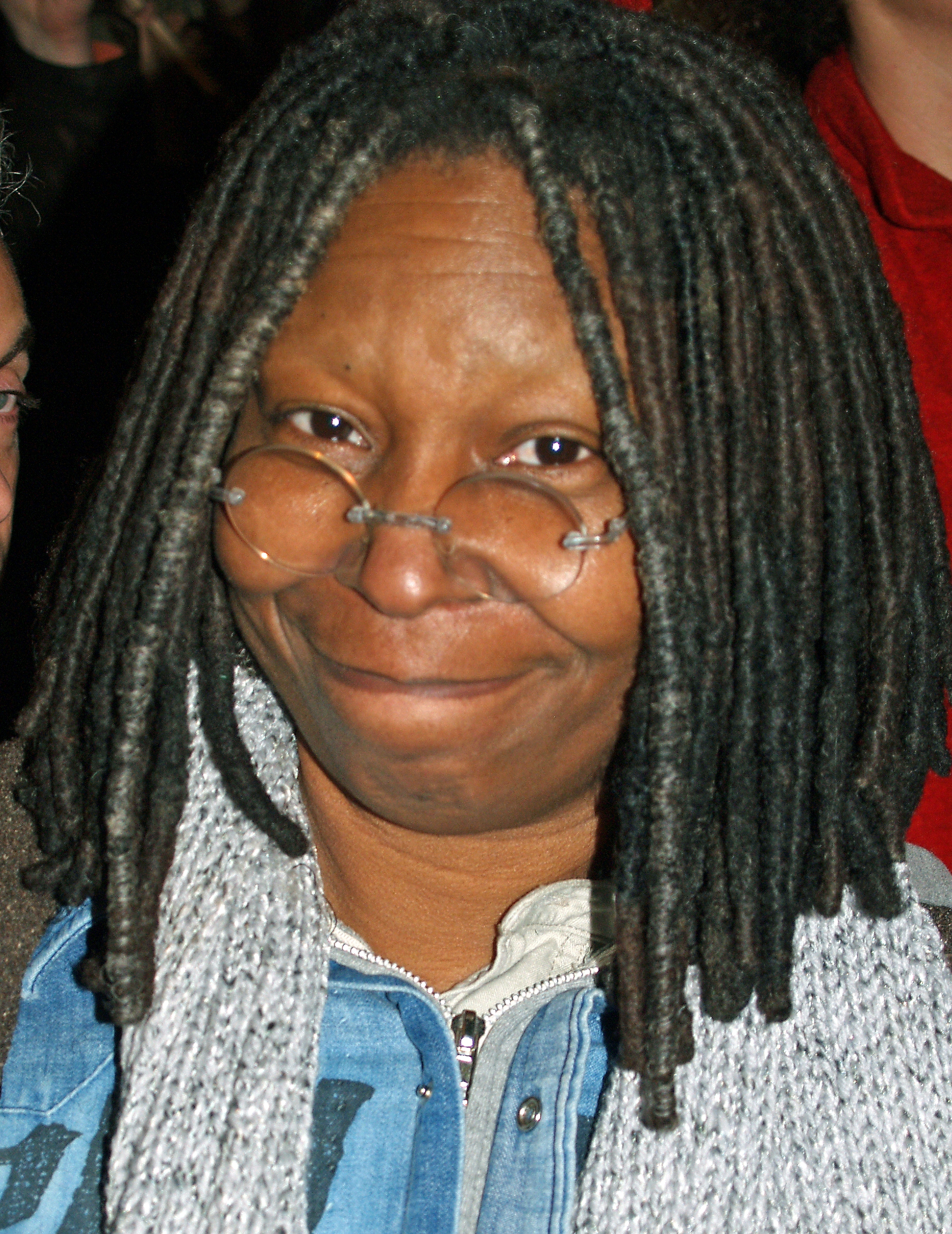
Whoopi Goldberg

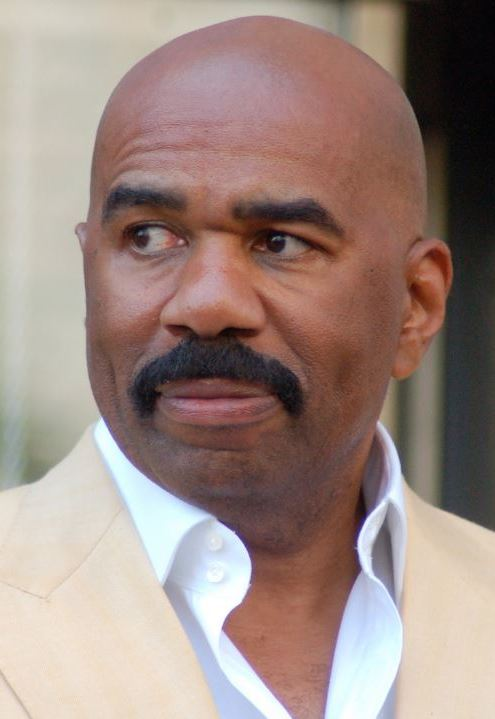
Steve Harvey

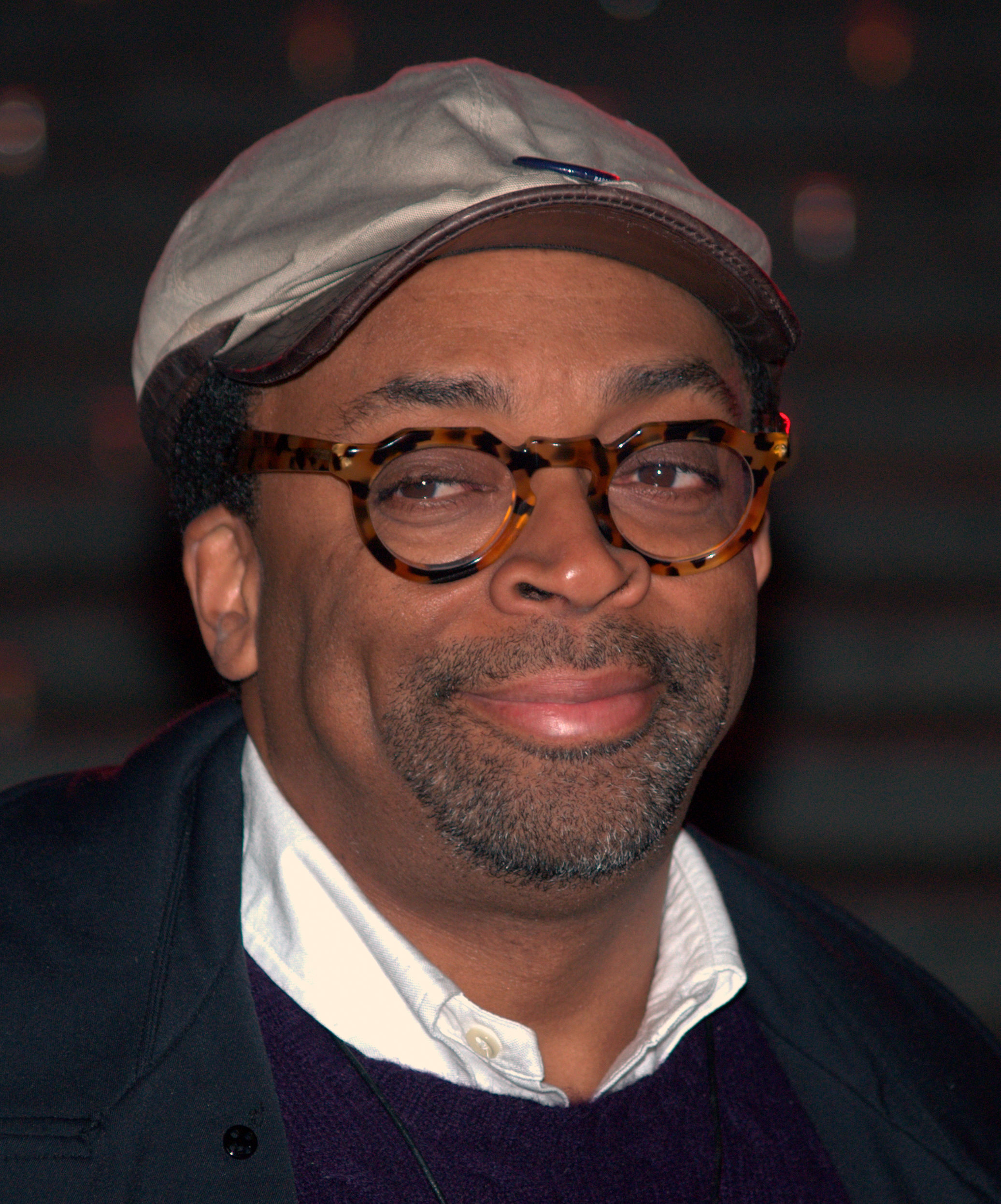
Spike Lee

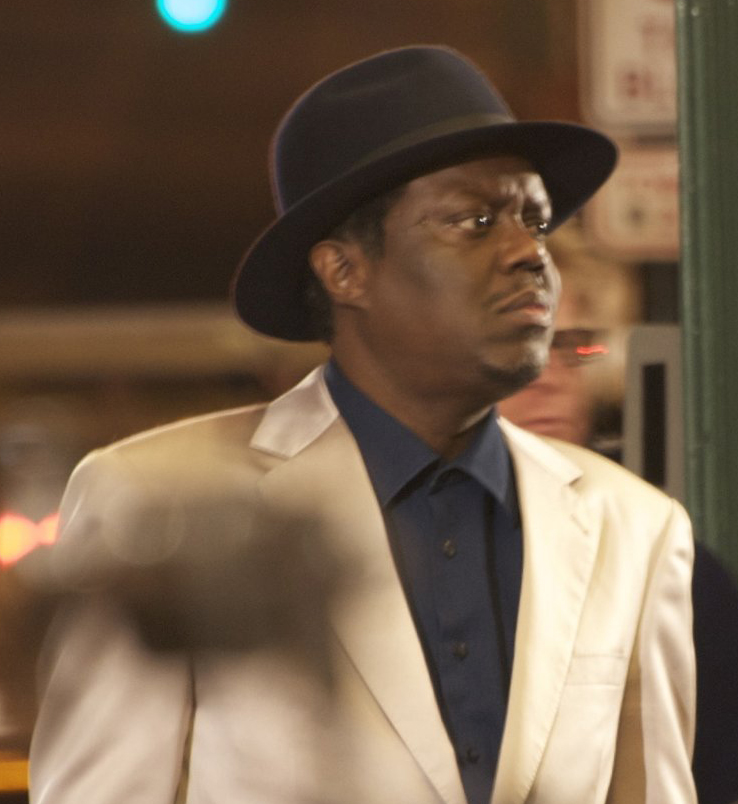
Bernie Mac

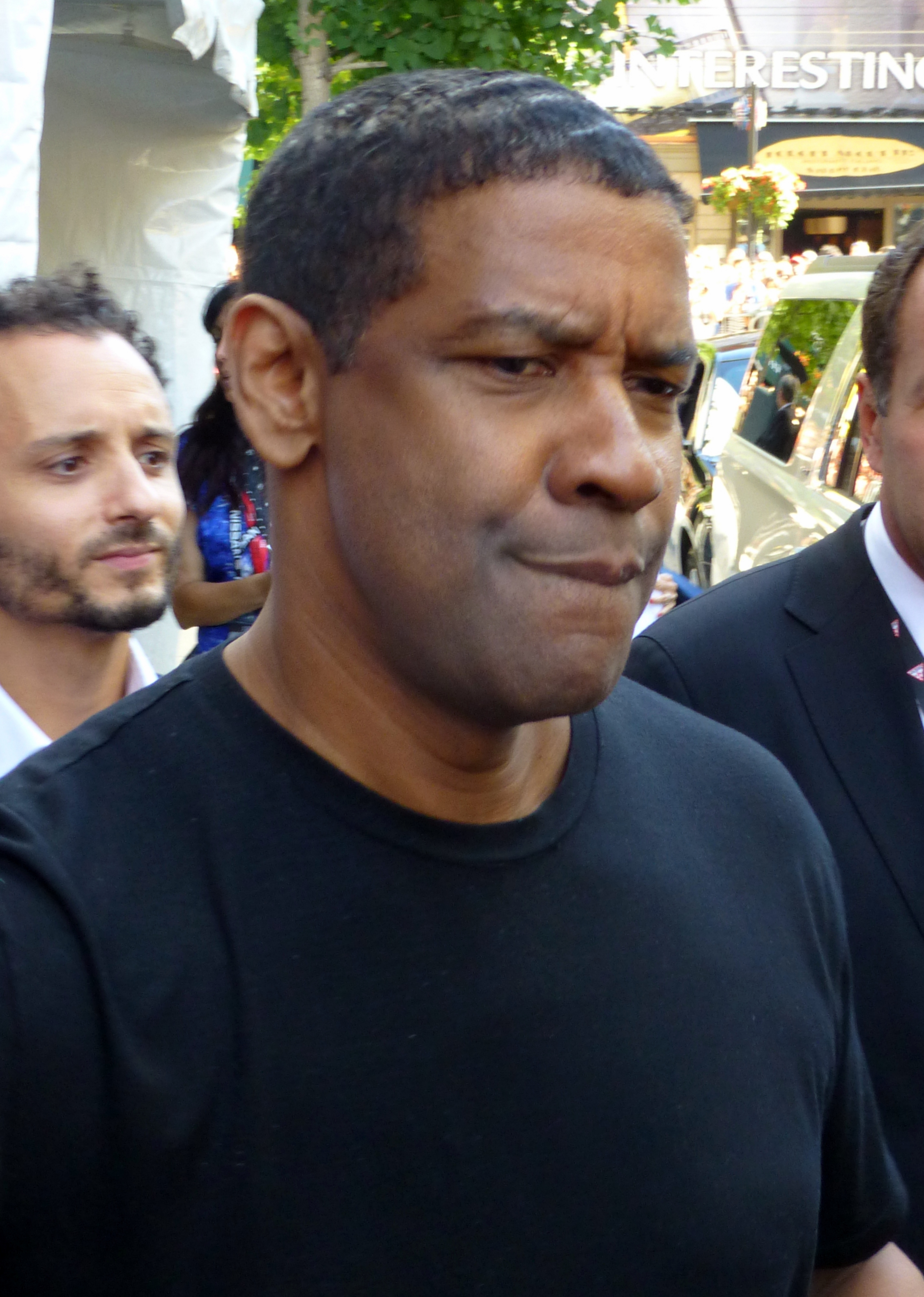
Denzel Washington

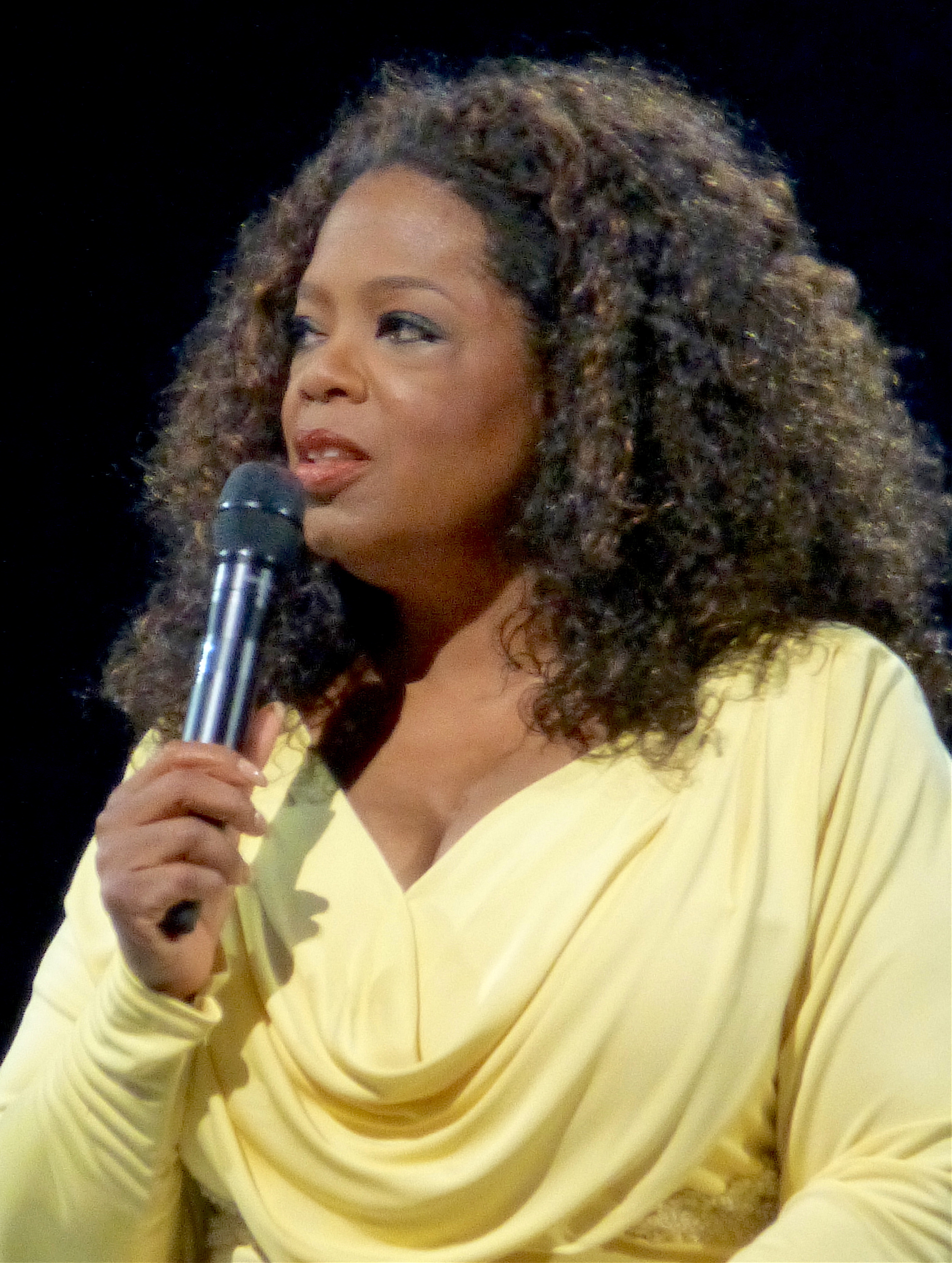
Oprah Winfrey

- Khandi Alexander, actress
- Debbie Allen, actress
- Sherman Augustus, actor, martial artist and former NFL player
- Patti Austin, singer
- BabyFace, singer
- Philip Bailey, singer
- Anita Baker, singer
- Leslie David Baker, actor
- Angela Bassett, actress
- Fred Berry, actor (d. 2003)
- Billy Blanks, actor
- Sharon Bryant, R&B singer
- Peabo Bryson, singer
- LeVar Burton, actor
- L. Scott Caldwell, actress
- Vanessa Bell Calloway, actress
- Reg E. Cathey, actor (d. 2018)
- Judy Cheeks, singer (d. 2025)
- Natalie Cole, actress (d. 2015)
- Tony Cox, actor
- Keith David, actor, comedian
- Michael Dorn, actor
- Suzzanne Douglas, actress (d. 2021)
- Denise Dowse, actress and director (d. 2022)
- Michael Clarke Duncan, actor (d. 2012)
- Charles S. Dutton, actor
- Giancarlo Esposito (Italian and African American heritage), actor
- Dave Fennoy, actor
- Clarence Gilyard, actor (d. 2022)
- Whoopi Goldberg, actress
- Robert Gossett, actor
- Grandmaster Flash, rapper and disc jockey
- David Alan Grier, actor
- Arsenio Hall, actor
- Vondie Curtis-Hall, actor
- Kevin Peter Hall, actor (d. 1991)
- Dorian Harewood, actor
- Jackee Harry (African-American father), actress
- Steve Harvey, comedian, actor
- Dennis Haysbert, actor
- Ruben Santiago-Hudson, actor, playwright, and director
- Jermaine Jackson, actor
- La Toya Jackson, actress
- Michael Jackson, King of pop and actor (d. 2009)
- Lawrence Hilton-Jacobs, actor
- Larry "Flash" Jenkins, actor, director, producer, screenwriter (d. 2019)
- Ralph Johnson, singer
- Jay Arlen Jones, actor (d. 2023)
- Ron Cephas Jones, actor (d. 2023)
- Chaka Khan, singer
- Spike Lee, film director, producer, writer, actor
- Jenifer Lewis, actress
- Tommy Lister Jr., actor (d. 2020)
- Bernie Mac, actor, comedian (d. 2008)
- Debbi Morgan, actress
- Mr. T, actor
- Charlie Murphy, actor and comedian (d. 2017)
- Lance E. Nichols, actor
- Bill Nunn, actor (d. 2016)
- Jo Marie Payton, actress
- Paul Pena, singer-songwriter, guitarist (d. 2005)
- CCH Pounder (with Caribbean blood), actress
- Clifton Powell, actor
- Prince, actor (d. 2016)
- Dianne Reeves, singer
- Ving Rhames, actor
- Howard Rollins, actor (d. 1996)
- Victoria Rowell (African-American father), actress
- Sinbad, actor and comedian
- Bern Nadette Stanis, actress
- Ron Taylor, actor (d. 2002)
- Tony Todd, actor (d. 2024)
- Reginald VelJohnson, actor
- Denzel Washington, actor, director and producer; winner of three Golden Globe Awards
- Verdine White, singer, bassist
- Lynn Whitfield, actress
- Deniece Williams, singer
- Mykelti Williamson, actor
- Oprah Winfrey, actress, media executive
- Stevie Wonder, singer
- Alfre Woodard, actress

== Born in the 1940s ==
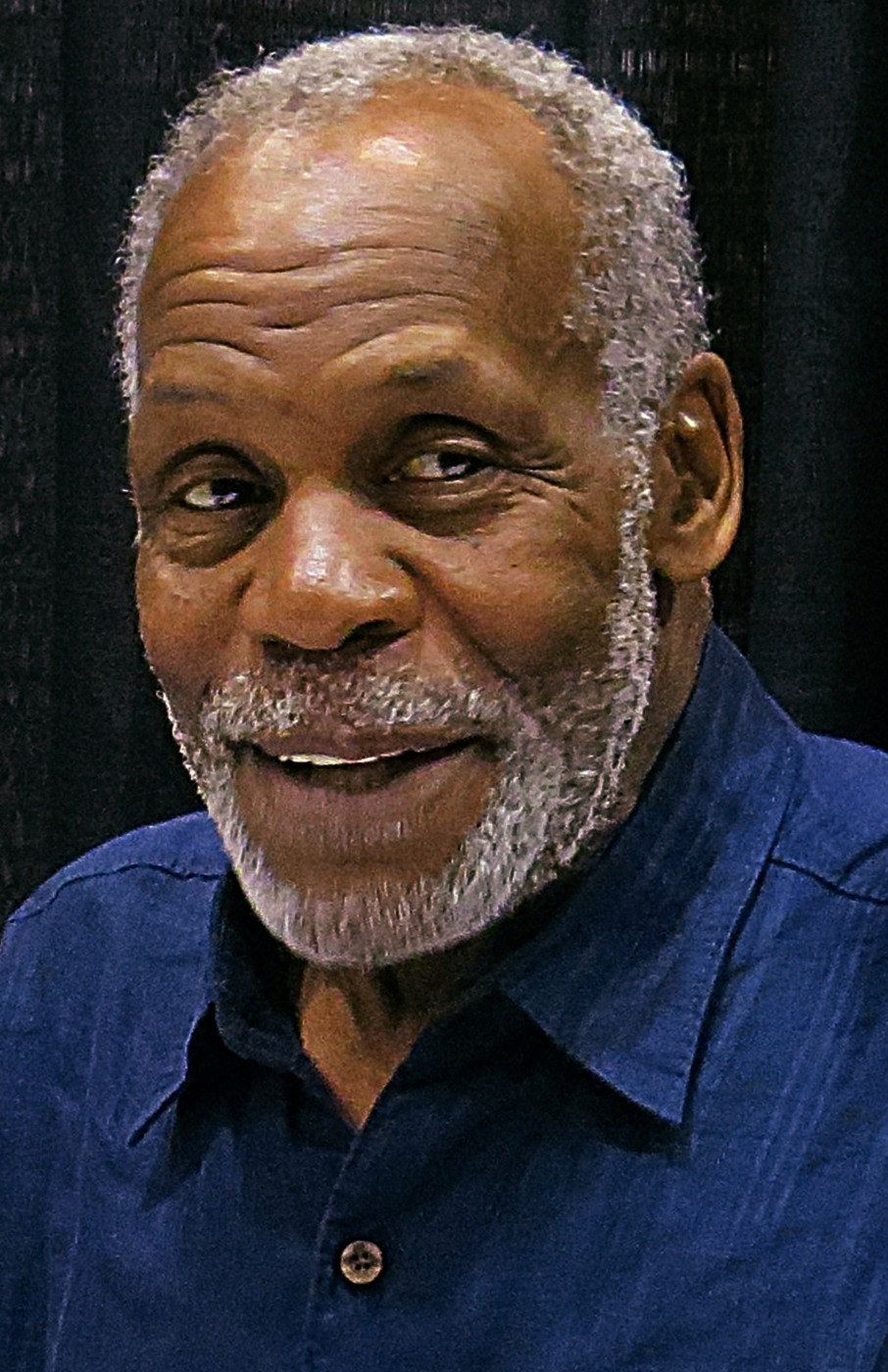
Danny Glover

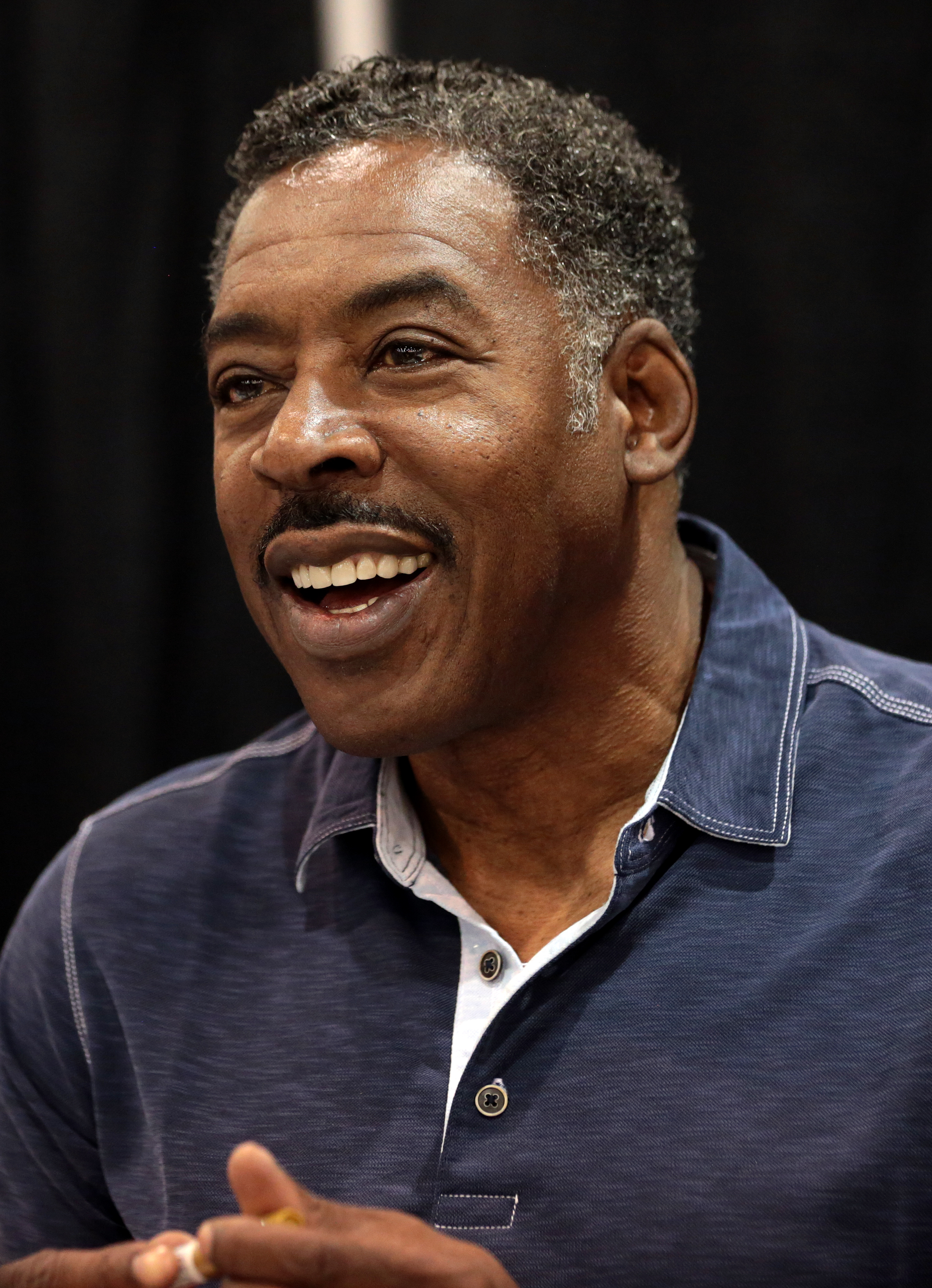
Ernie Hudson

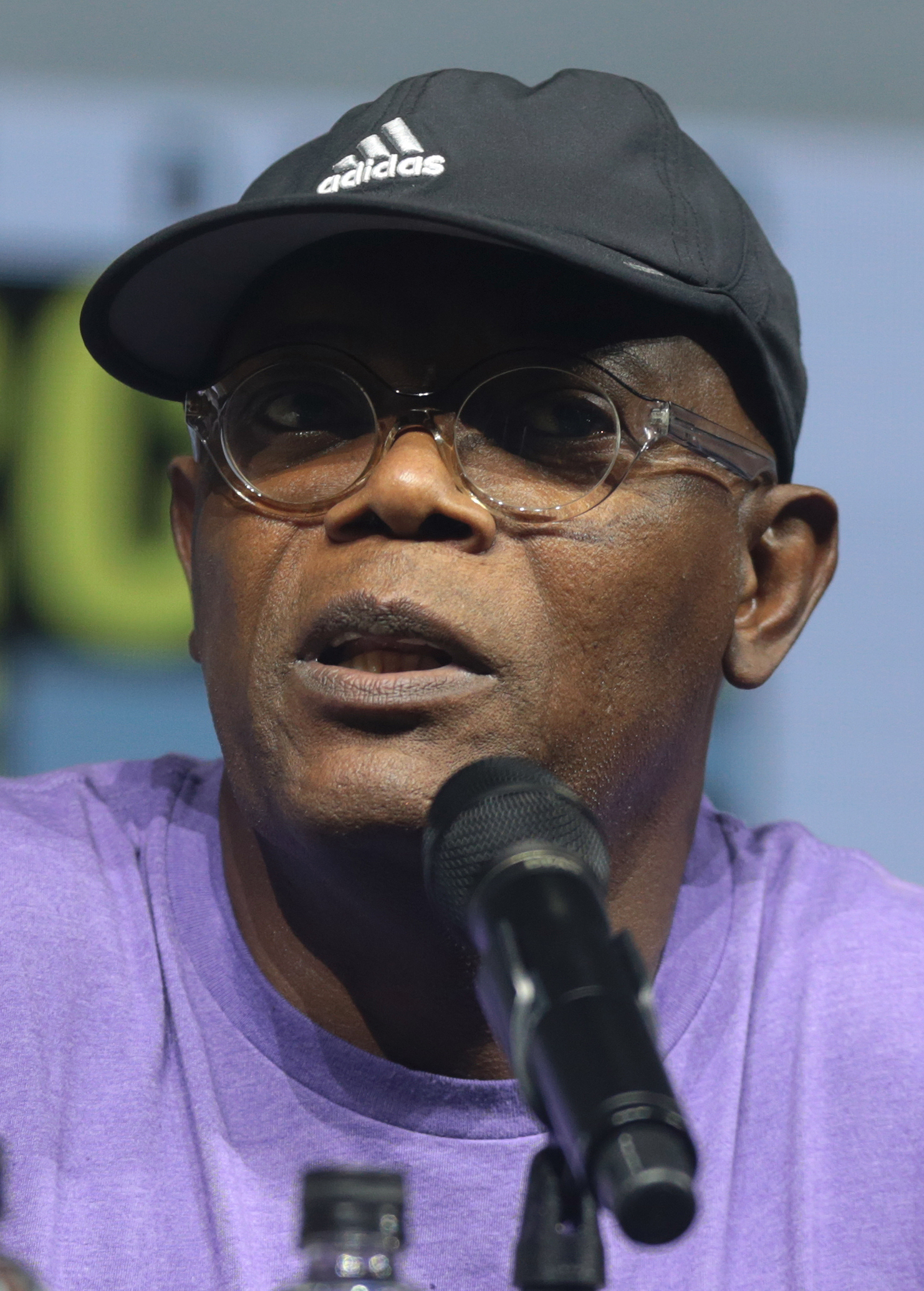
Samuel L. Jackson

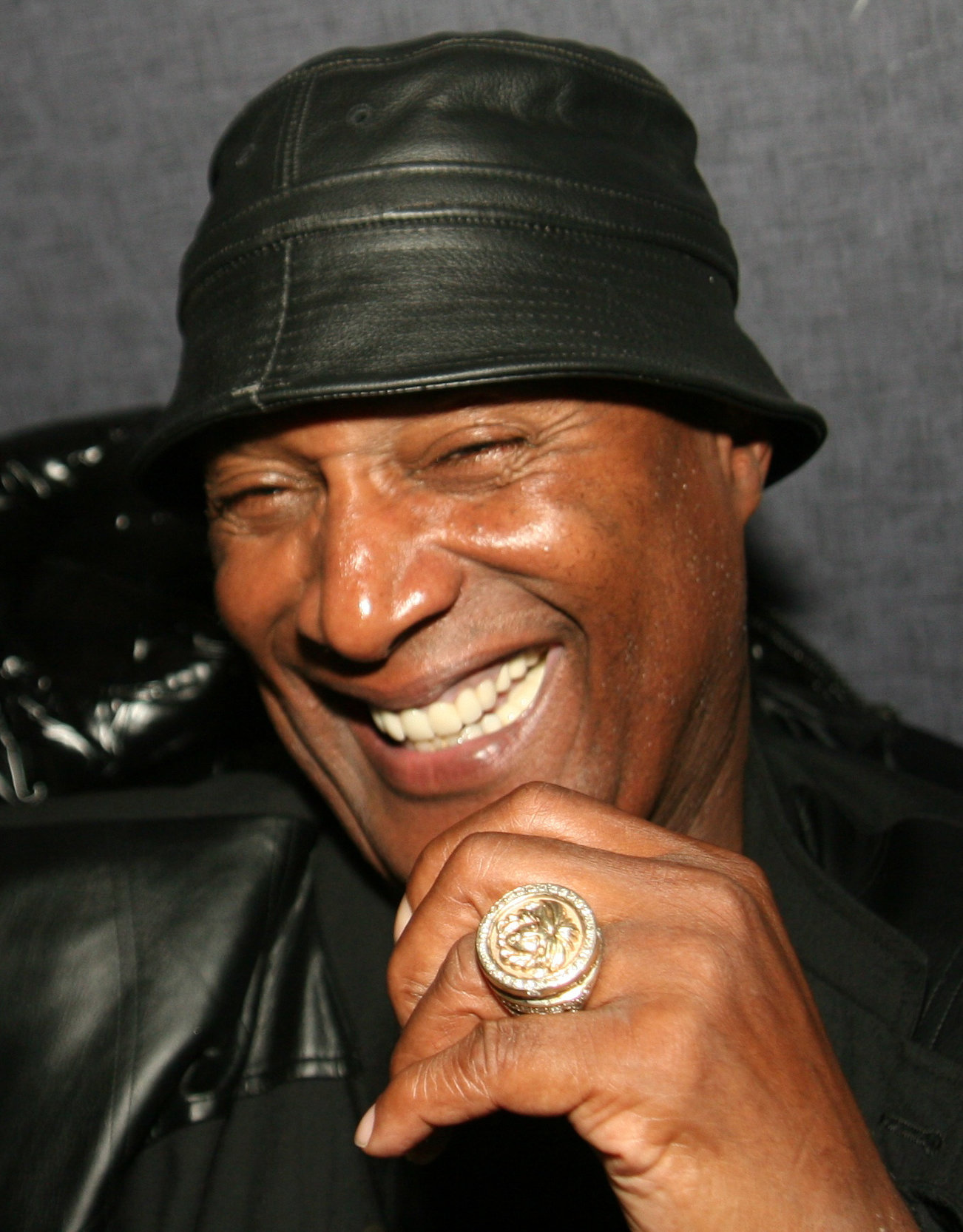
Paul Mooney

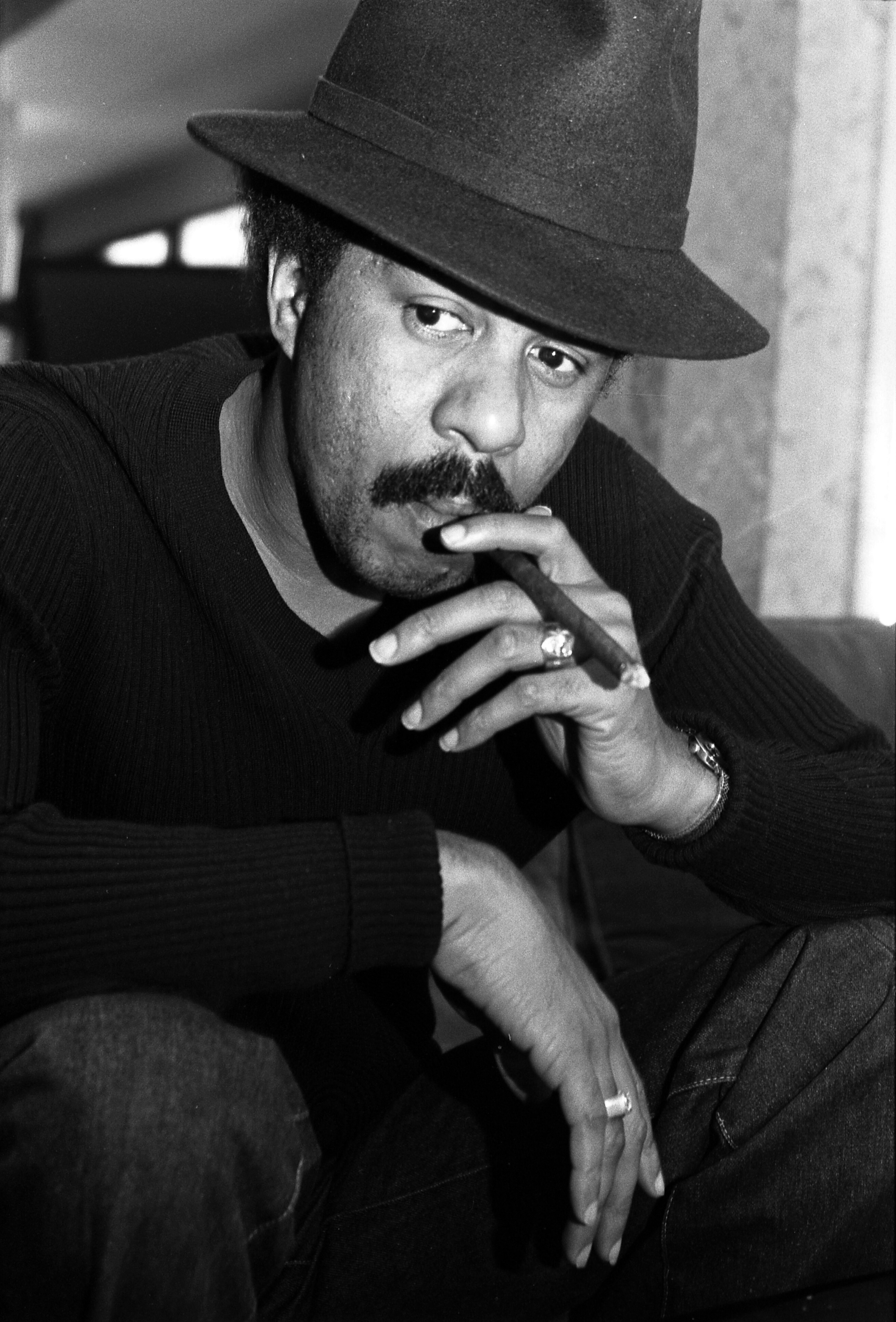
Richard Pryor

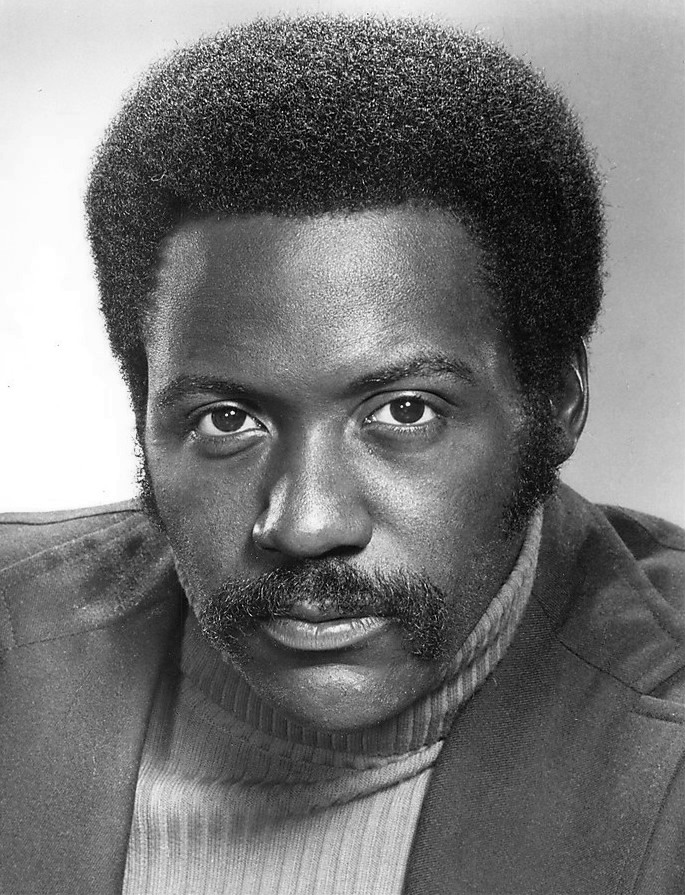
Richard Roundtree

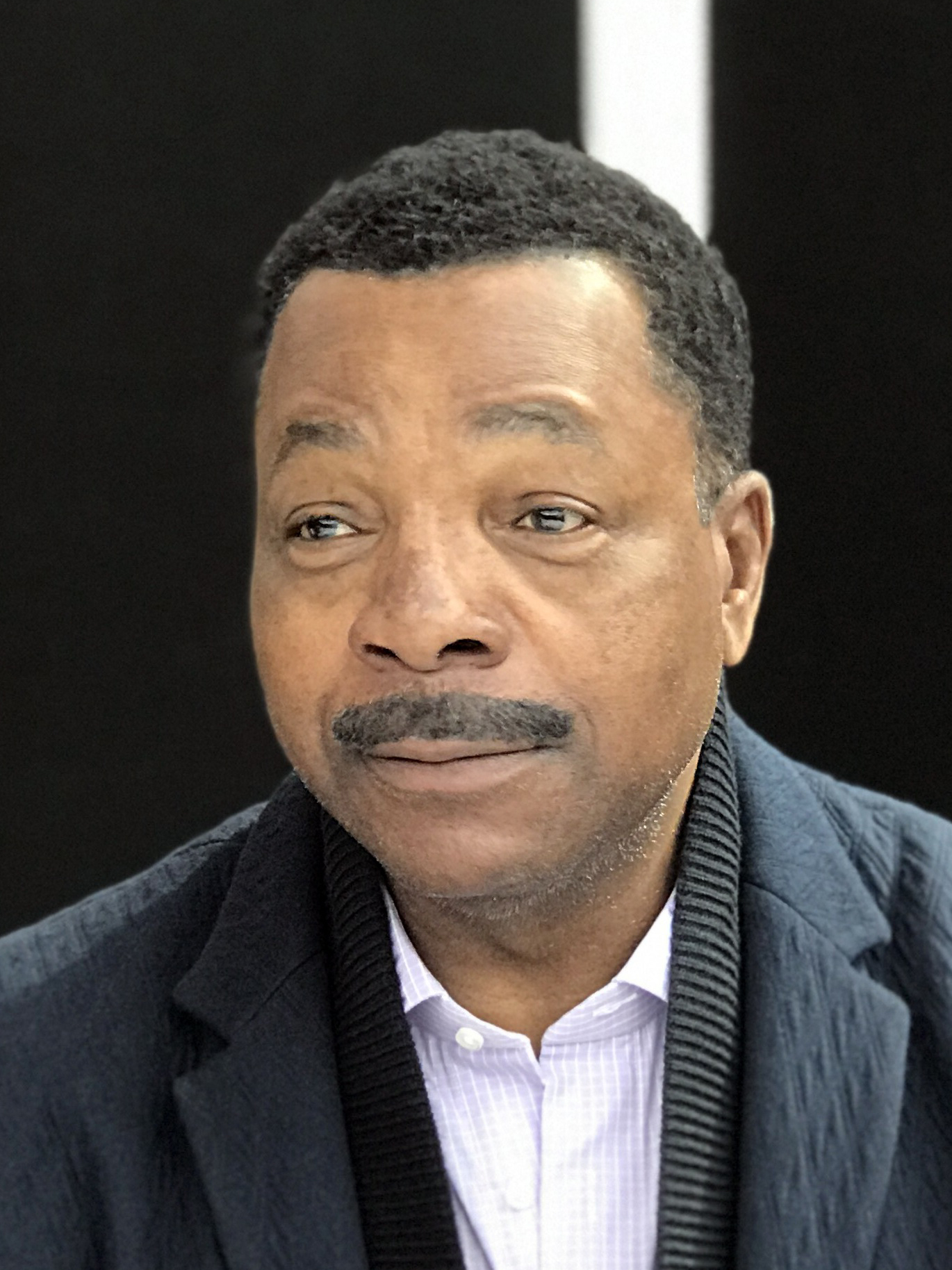
Carl Weathers

- James Avery, actor (d. 2013)
- Margaret Avery, actress
- Taurean Blacque, actor (d. 2022)
- John Beasley, actor (d. 2023)
- George Benson, singer
- Avery Brooks, actor
- Roger Aaron Brown, actor
- Ron Canada, actor and producer
- Nell Carter, actress (d. 2003)
- Olivia Cole, actress (d. 2018)
- Hugh Dane, actor (d. 2018)
- Loretta Devine, actress
- Art Evans, actor (d. 2024)
- Damon Evans, actor
- Mike Evans, actor (d. 2006)
- Jessie Lawrence Ferguson, actor (d. 2019)
- Ken Foree, actor
- Aretha Franklin, actress (d. 2018)
- Sheila Frazier, actress
- Ron Glass, actor (d. 2016)
- Danny Glover, actor
- Cuba Gooding Sr., actor (d. 2017)
- Larry Graham, singer
- Teresa Graves, actress (d. 2002)
- Pam Grier, actress
- Alaina Reed Hall, actress (d. 2009)
- Isaac Hayes, actor (d. 2008)
- Shirley Hemphill, actress (d. 1999)
- Gregory Hines, actor (d. 2003)
- Mike Hodge, actor (d. 2017)
- Kene Holliday, actor
- Telma Hopkins, actress and singer
- Anna Maria Horsford, actress
- Ernie Hudson, actor
- Samuel L. Jackson, actor
- Jim Kelly, actor (d. 2013)
- Gladys Knight, actress
- Patti LaBelle, actress
- Ted Lange, actor
- Darlene Love, actress
- Al Matthews, actor (d. 2018)
- Vonetta McGee, actress (d. 2010)
- Frank McRae, actor (d. 2021)
- Paul Mooney, actor and comedian (d. 2021)
- Joe Morton, actor
- Jeffrey Osborne, singer
- Billy Preston, actor (d. 2006)
- Joan Pringle, actress
- Richard Pryor, actor and comedian (d. 2005)
- Marion Ramsey, actress (d. 2021)
- Daphne Maxwell Reid, actress and comedian
- Tim Reid, actor
- James Reynolds, actor
- LaTanya Richardson, actress
- Lionel Richie, actor, composer, and singer
- Charlie Robinson, actor (d. 2021)
- Roger Robinson, actor (d. 2018)
- Smokey Robinson, singer
- Diana Ross, actress and singer
- Richard Roundtree, actor (d. 2023)
- O. J. Simpson, actor (d. 2024)
- Carly Simon, singer
- Bubba Smith, actor (d. 2011)
- Meshach Taylor, actor (d. 2014)
- Lynne Thigpen, actress (d. 2003)
- Ernest Lee Thomas, actor
- Berlinda Tolbert, actress
- Glynn Turman, actor
- Leslie Uggams, actress and singer
- Ben Vereen, actor, dancer, and singer
- Jimmie Walker, actor
- Dionne Warwick, actress and singer
- Carl Weathers, actor (d. 2024)
- Demond Wilson, actor (d. 2026)
- Theodore Wilson, actor (d. 1991)
- John Witherspoon, actor and comedian (d. 2019)
- Samuel E. Wright, actor (d. 2021)

== Born in the 1930s ==
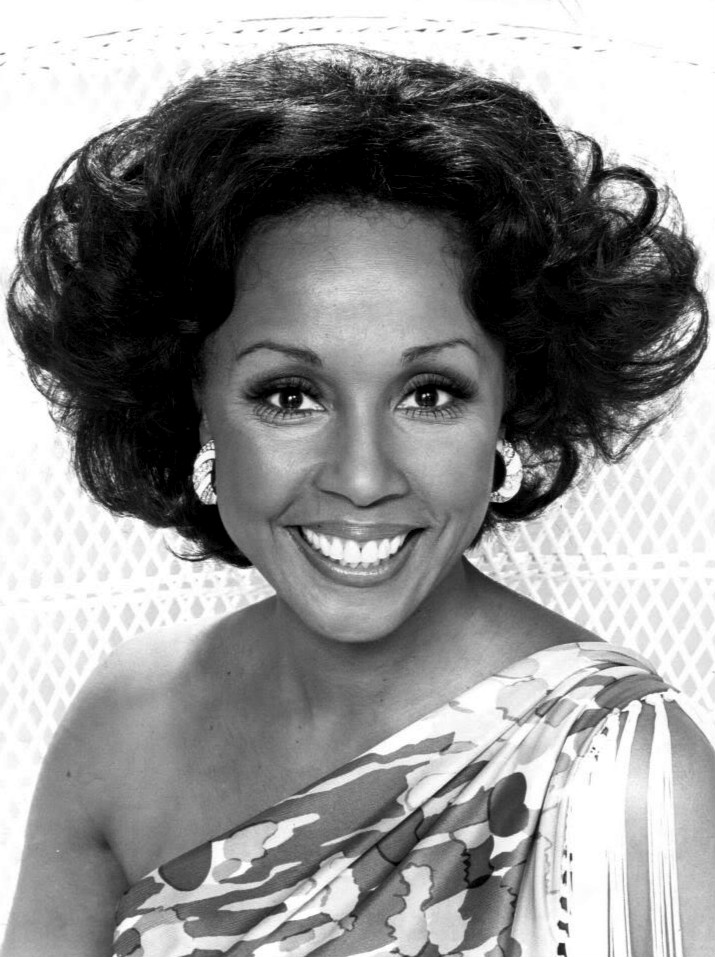
Diahann Carroll

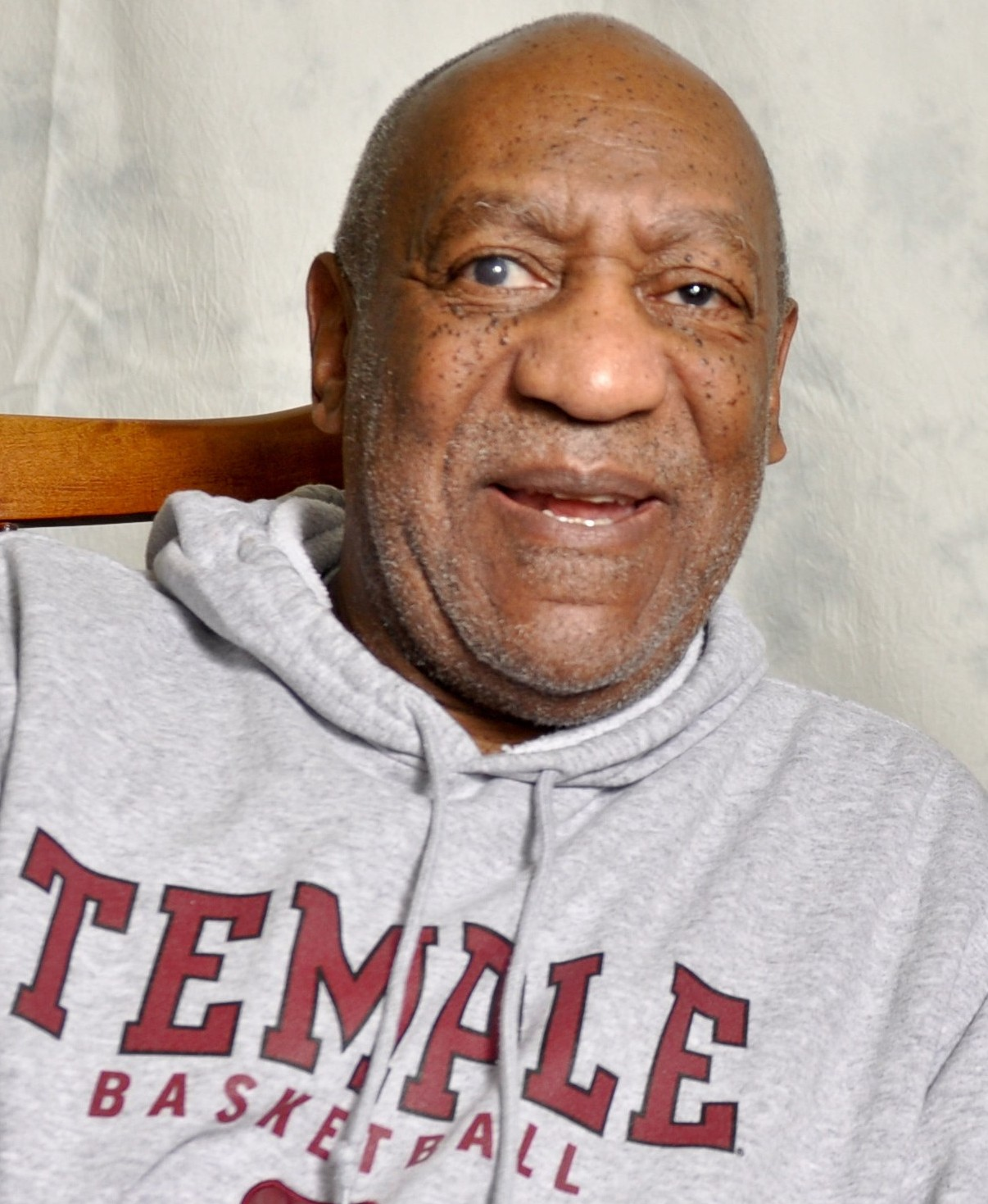
Bill Cosby

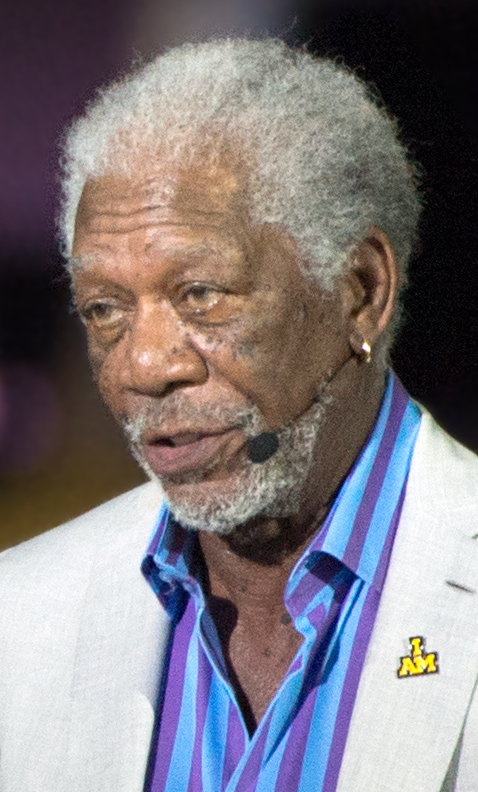
Morgan Freeman

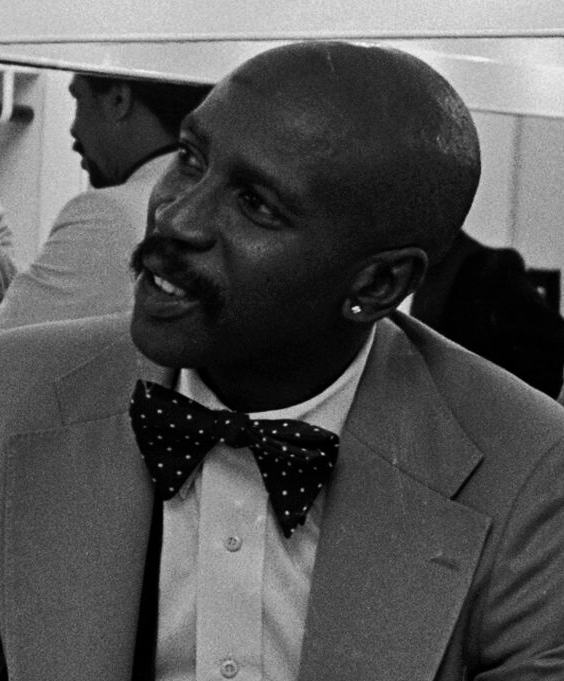
Louis Gossett Jr.

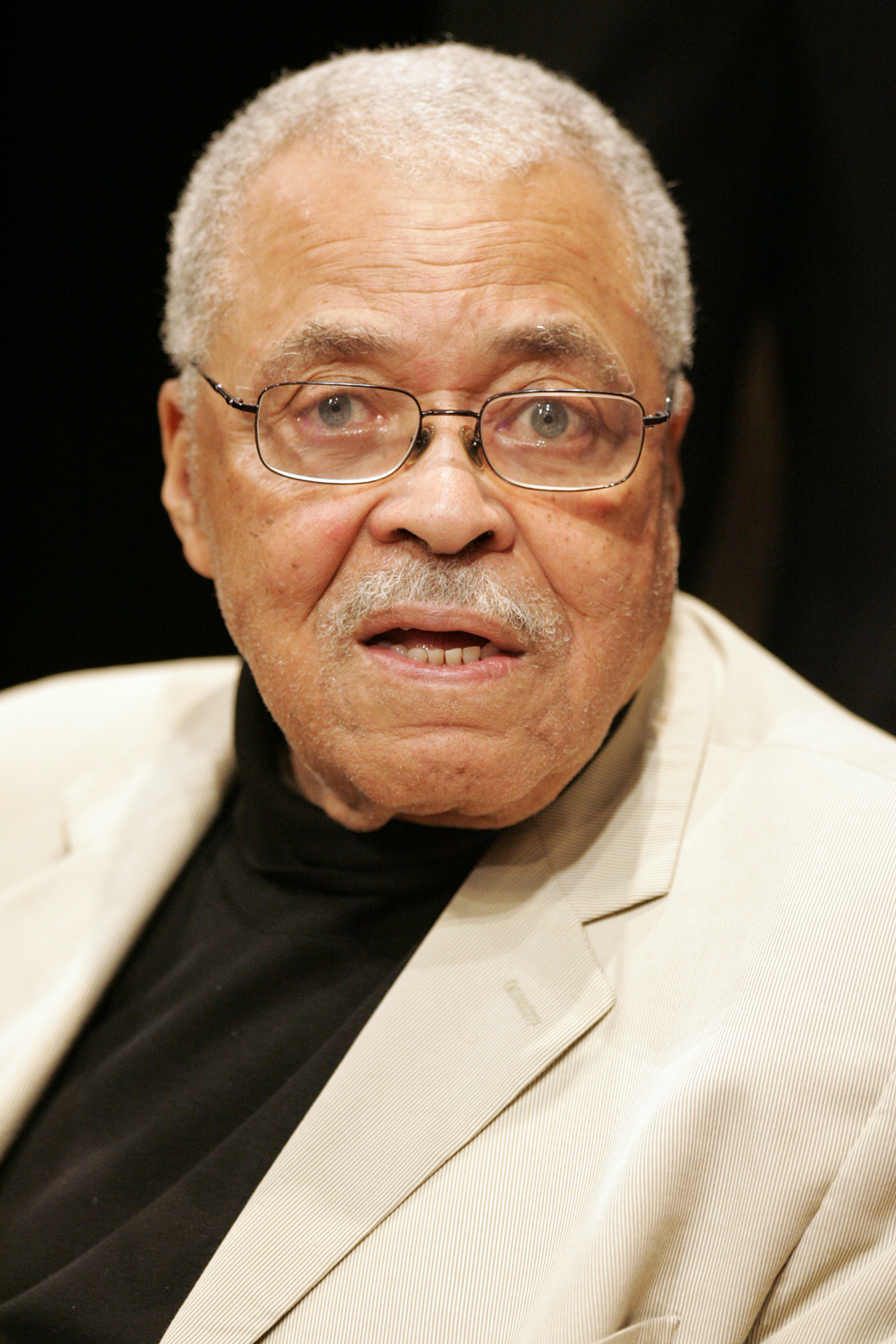
James Earl Jones

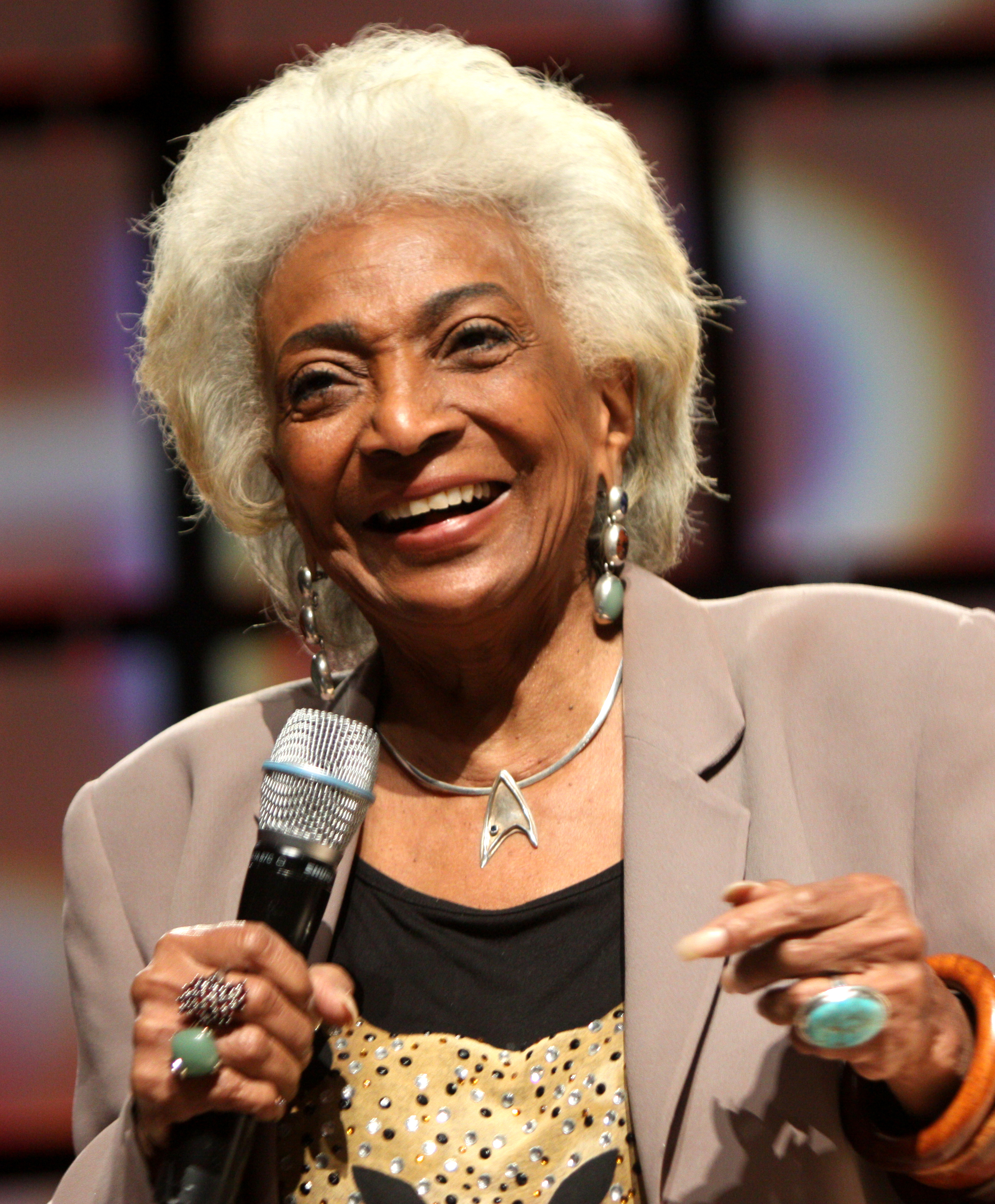
Nichelle Nichols

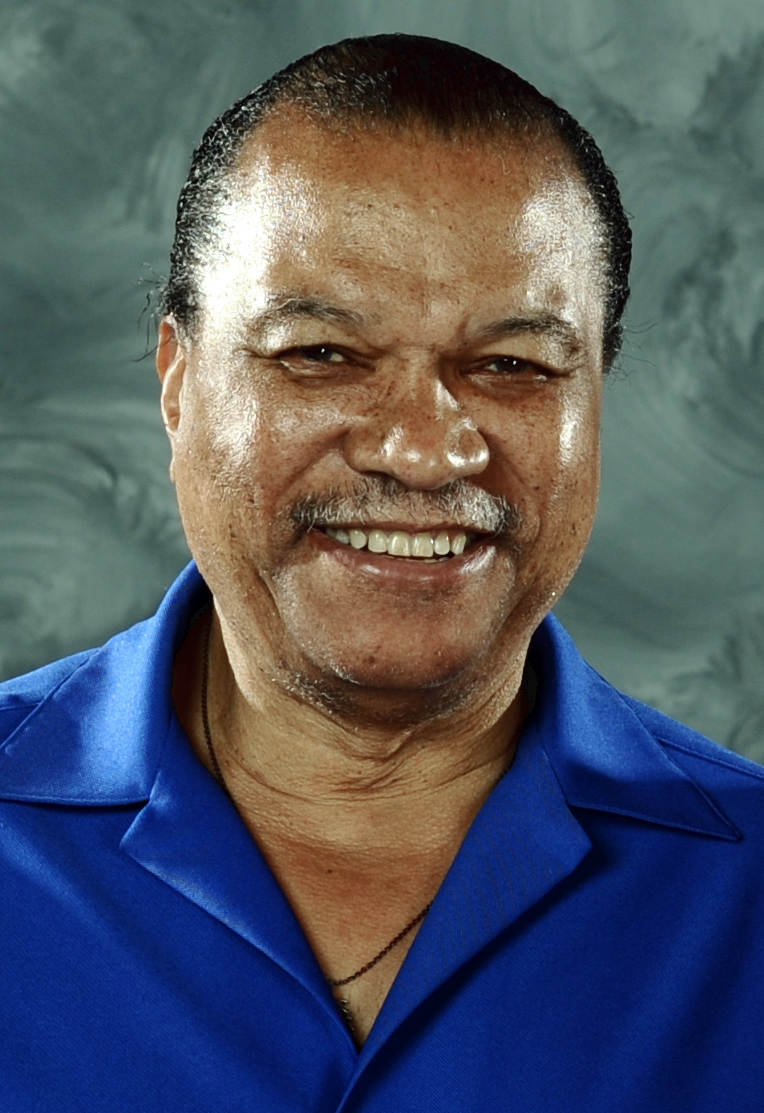
Billy Dee Williams

- Mary Alice, actress (d. 2022)
- John Amos, actor (d. 2024)
- Paul Benjamin, actor (d. 2019)
- Johnny Brown, actor (d. 2022)
- Jim Brown, actor (d. 2023)
- Tony Burton, actor (d. 2016)
- Godfrey Cambridge, comedian and actor (d. 1976)
- Diahann Carroll, actress (d. 2019)
- Bernie Casey, actor (d. 2017)
- Rosalind Cash, actress and singer (d. 1995)
- Ray Charles, actor (d. 2004)
- Bill Cobbs, actor (d. 2024)
- Bill Cosby, actor and comedian
- Ivan Dixon, actor, director, and producer (d. 2008)
- Robert DoQui, actor (d. 2008)
- Ja'Net DuBois, actress (d. 2020)
- Roberta Flack, singer (d. 2025)
- Gloria Foster, actress (d. 2001)
- Al Freeman Jr., actor and director (d. 2012)
- Morgan Freeman, actor
- Marla Gibbs, actress
- Carl Gordon, actor (d. 2010)
- Louis Gossett Jr., actor (d. 2024)
- Dick Gregory, actor and comedian (d. 2017)
- Rosey Grier, actor
- Bill Gunn, actor and director (d. 1989)
- Lynn Hamilton, actress (d. 2025)
- Lloyd Haynes, actor (d. 1986)
- Sherman Hemsley, actor (d. 2012)
- Ellen Holly, actress (d. 2023)
- Robert Hooks, actor
- Raymond St. Jacques, actor (d. 1990)
- Rafer Johnson, actor (d. 2020)
- Duane Jones, actor (d. 1988)
- James Earl Jones, actor (d. 2024)
- Lincoln Kilpatrick, actor (d. 2004)
- Mabel King, actress (d. 1999)
- Yaphet Kotto, actor (d. 2021)
- Cleavon Little, actor (d. 1992)
- Janet MacLachlan, actress (d. 2010)
- Don Marshall, actor (d. 2016)
- Whitman Mayo, actor (d. 2001)
- James McEachin, actor (d. 2025)
- Barbara McNair, actress and singer (d. 2007)
- Garrett Morris, actor and comedian
- Greg Morris, actor (d. 1996)
- Roger E. Mosley, actor (d. 2022)
- Lou Myers, actor (d. 2013)
- Nichelle Nichols, actress (d. 2022)
- Ron O'Neal, actor (d. 2004)
- Melvin Van Peebles, actor and filmmaker (d. 2021)
- J. A. Preston, actor
- Thalmus Rasulala, actor (d. 1991)
- Lou Rawls, actor (d. 2006)
- Della Reese, actress, singer (d. 2017)
- Little Richard, actor (d. 2020)
- Matt Robinson, actor and producer (d. 2002)
- Madge Sinclair, actress (d. 1995)
- Nathaniel Taylor, actor (d. 2019)
- Wally Taylor, actor (d. 2012)
- Tina Turner, actress and singer (d. 2023)
- Billy Dee Williams, actor
- Clarence Williams III, actor (d. 2021)
- Hal Williams, actor
- Fred Williamson, actor
- Flip Wilson, actor and comedian (d. 1998)
- Nancy Wilson, actress (d. 2018)
- Paul Winfield, actor (d. 2004)

== Born in the 1920s ==
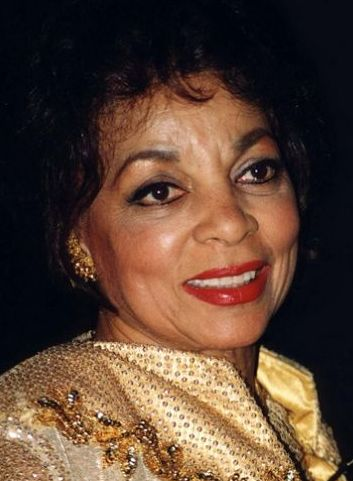
Ruby Dee

- Maya Angelou, actress (d. 2014)
- Harry Belafonte, actor and singer (d. 2023)
- Roscoe Lee Browne, actor (d. 2007)
- Virginia Capers, actor (d. 2004)
- Rupert Crosse, actor (d. 1973)
- Sammy Davis Jr., actor (d. 1990)
- Ruby Dee, actress (d. 2014)
- Redd Foxx, comedian, actor (d. 1991)
- Susie Garrett, actress (d. 2002)
- Robert Guillaume, actor (d. 2017)
- Moses Gunn, actor (d. 1993)
- Bernie Hamilton, actor (d. 2008)
- Julius Harris, actor (d. 2004)
- Eartha Kitt, actress (d. 2008)
- William Marshall, actor and director (d. 2003)
- LaWanda Page, actress (d. 2002)
- Brock Peters, actor (d. 2005)
- Sidney Poitier, actor (d. 2022)
- Roxie Roker, actress (d. 1995)
- Esther Rolle, actress (d. 1998)
- Mel Stewart, actor (d. 2002)
- Cicely Tyson, actress (d. 2021)
- William Warfield, actor (d. 2002)

== Born in the 1910s ==
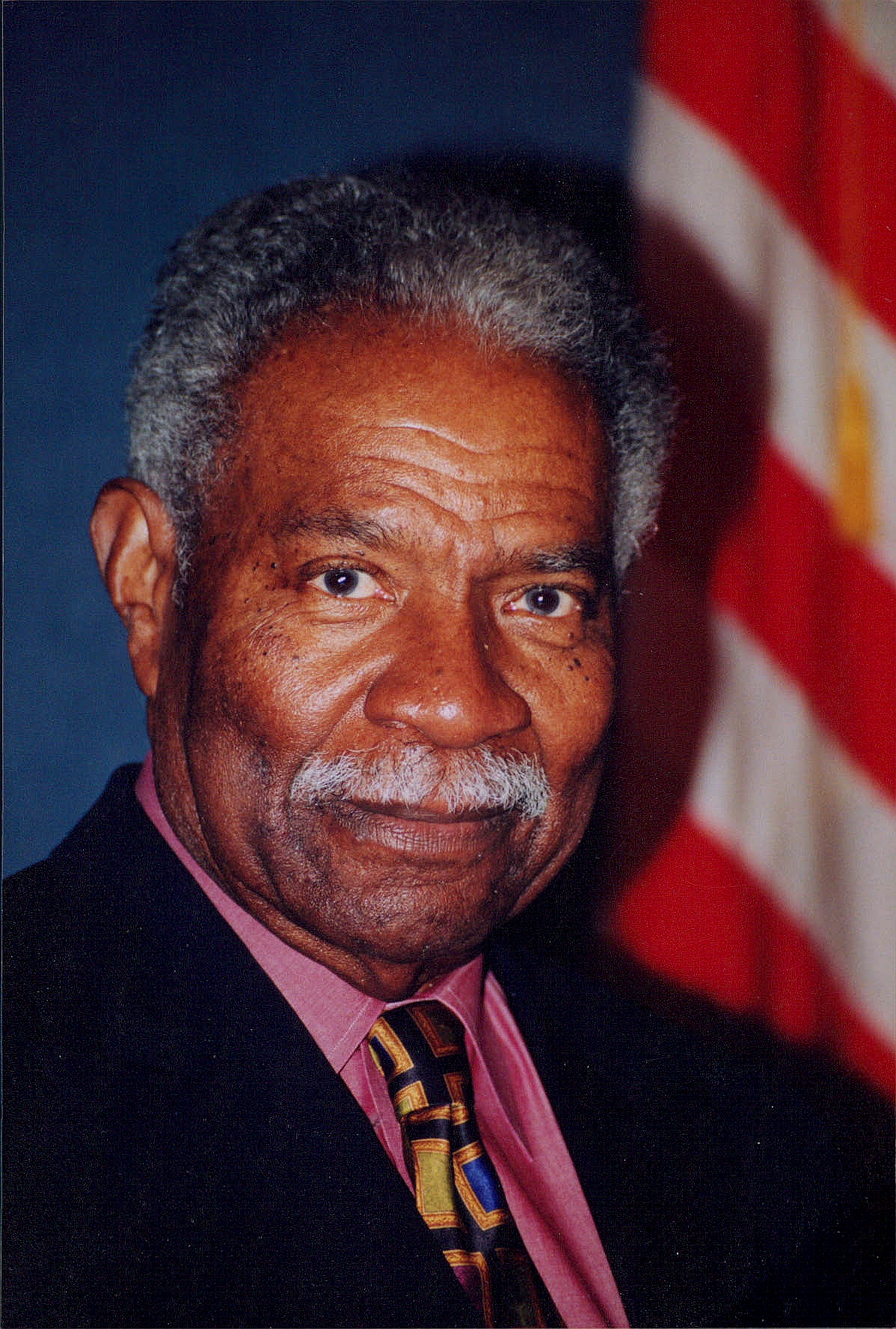
Ossie Davis

- Willie Best, actor and comedian (d. 1962)
- Nat King Cole, actor (d. 1965)
- Scatman Crothers, actor (d. 1986)
- Ossie Davis, actor (d. 2005)
- Tina Dixon, R&B singer, actress and comedian (d. 2004)
- Roy Glenn, actor (d. 1971)
- Edna Mae Harris, actress, singer (d. 1997)
- Robert Earl Jones, actor and professional boxer (d. 2007)
- Sybil Lewis, actress (d. 1988)
- Nina Mae McKinney, actress and singer (d. 1995)
- Butterfly McQueen, actress (d. 1967)
- Juanita Moore, actress (d. 2014)
- Maidie Norman, actress (d. 1998)
- Jimmy Robinson, actor (d. 1967)
- Timmie Rogers, comedian, actor (d. 2006)
- Nipsey Russell, comedian (d. 2005)
- Isabel Sanford, actress, comedian (d. 2004)
- Joe Seneca, actor, singer, and songwriter (d. 1996)
- Woody Strode, actor (d. 1994)
- Clarice Taylor, actress (d. 2011)
- Napoleon Whiting, actor (d. 1984)

== Born in the 1900s ==
- Eddie Anderson, actor (d. 1977)
- James Baskett, actor (d. 1948)
- Louise Beavers, actress (d. 1962)
- Mildred Boyd, actress, singer, and dancer (d. 1999)
- Everett Brown, actor (d. 1953)
- Cab Calloway, actor (d. 1994)
- Alvin Childress, actor (d. 1986)
- Ruby Dandridge, actress (d. 1987)
- Dudley Dickerson, actor (d. 1968)
- Theresa Harris, actress, singer, dancer (d. 1985)
- Gee Gee James, radio and theater actress and singer (d. 1971)
- Canada Lee, professional athlete, musician, and actor (d. 1952)
- Mantan Moreland, actor and comedian (d. 1973)
- Alice Whitman, actress (d. 1968)
- Fred Toones, actor and comedian (d. 1962)
- Lillian Yarbo, actress, dancer, and singer (d. 1996)

== Born in the 1890s ==
- Ismay Andrews, actor (d. ?)
- Rex Ingram, actor (d. 1969)
- John Marriott, actor (d. 1977)
- Charles R. Moore, actor (d. 1947)
- Charles Olden, actor (d. 1943)
- Lillian Randolph, actress (d. 1980)
- Paul Robeson, actor (d. 1976)
- Edward Thompson, actor (d. 1960)
- Bill Walker, actor (d. 1992)
- Blue Washington, actor (d. 1970)
- Spencer Williams Jr., actor and filmmaker (d. 1969)
- Zara Cully, actress (d. 1978)

== Born in the 1880s ==
- Spencer Bell, actor (d. 1935)
- Sam McDaniel, actor (d. 1962)
- Tim Moore, actor (d. 1958)
- Clarence Muse, actor (d. 1979)
- Whitman Sisters, actresses
- Oscar Smith, actor (d. 1956)

== Born in the 19th century ==
- Ira Aldridge, actor (d. 1867)
- Amanda and Samuel Chambers, early members of the Church of Jesus Christ of Latter-day Saints in Utah (d. 1929)
- David Fagen, buffalo soldier, anti-imperialist (d. ?)
- Jesse Graves, actor (d. 1949)
- Irving Jones, comedian and songwriter (d. 1932)
- Cora Ann Pair Thomas, missionary (d. 1952)

== See also ==
- Lists of actors
- List of former African-American child actors
- Lists of African Americans
- African American cinema
