= Lioness =

Lioness(es) may refer to:

- Lioness, a female lion

== Music ==
- Lioness Records, a British record label
- Lioness (band), a Canadian indie rock band
  - Lioness (EP), their 2008 EP
- Lioness (Sivert Høyem album), 2016
- Lioness (Beccy Cole album), 2018
- The Lioness (album), a 2000 album by Songs: Ohia, or its title song
- Lioness: Hidden Treasures, a 2011 posthumous compilation album by Amy Winehouse
- The Lioness, a rapper from Minneapolis, Minnesota

== Other media ==
- Lioness (2008 film), a documentary about American servicewomen in Iraq
- Wildcat (2025 film), American action thriller film directed by James Nunn under the working title Lionness
- Lioness (South African TV series) (2021–present), a crime drama
- Lioness (American TV series) (2023–present), a spy thriller series
- The Lioness (novel) (2002), a novel by Nancy Varian Berberick

== Sports teams ==
=== National sports teams nicknamed Lionesses ===
- Argentina women's national field hockey team (known as Las Leonas, "The Lionesses" in Spanish)
- England women's national football team
- England women's national rugby league team
- Great Britain women's national rugby league team
- Kenya women's national rugby sevens team
- Netherlands women's national football team (known as De Leeuwinnen, "The Lionesses" in Dutch)

=== Club sports teams ===
- London City Lionesses, an English women's football club
- Millwall Lionesses L.F.C., an English women's football club
- Stade Bordelais Women, a rugby union club in Bordeaux, France (known as les Lionnes, the Lionesses)

== Other uses ==
- Team Lioness, female teams of United States Marines during the Iraq War
- USS Lioness (1857), a steam ram ship
- Lioness line, a railway line in the London area
- Jeanne de Clisson (1300–1359), privateer known as the Lioness of Brittany

== See also ==
- Lion (disambiguation)
- Singappenney (disambiguation) (lit. 'Lioness')
- Lioness Asuka, Japanese professional wrestler
