= List of awards and nominations received by Zoe Saldaña =

Zoe Saldaña awards and nominations
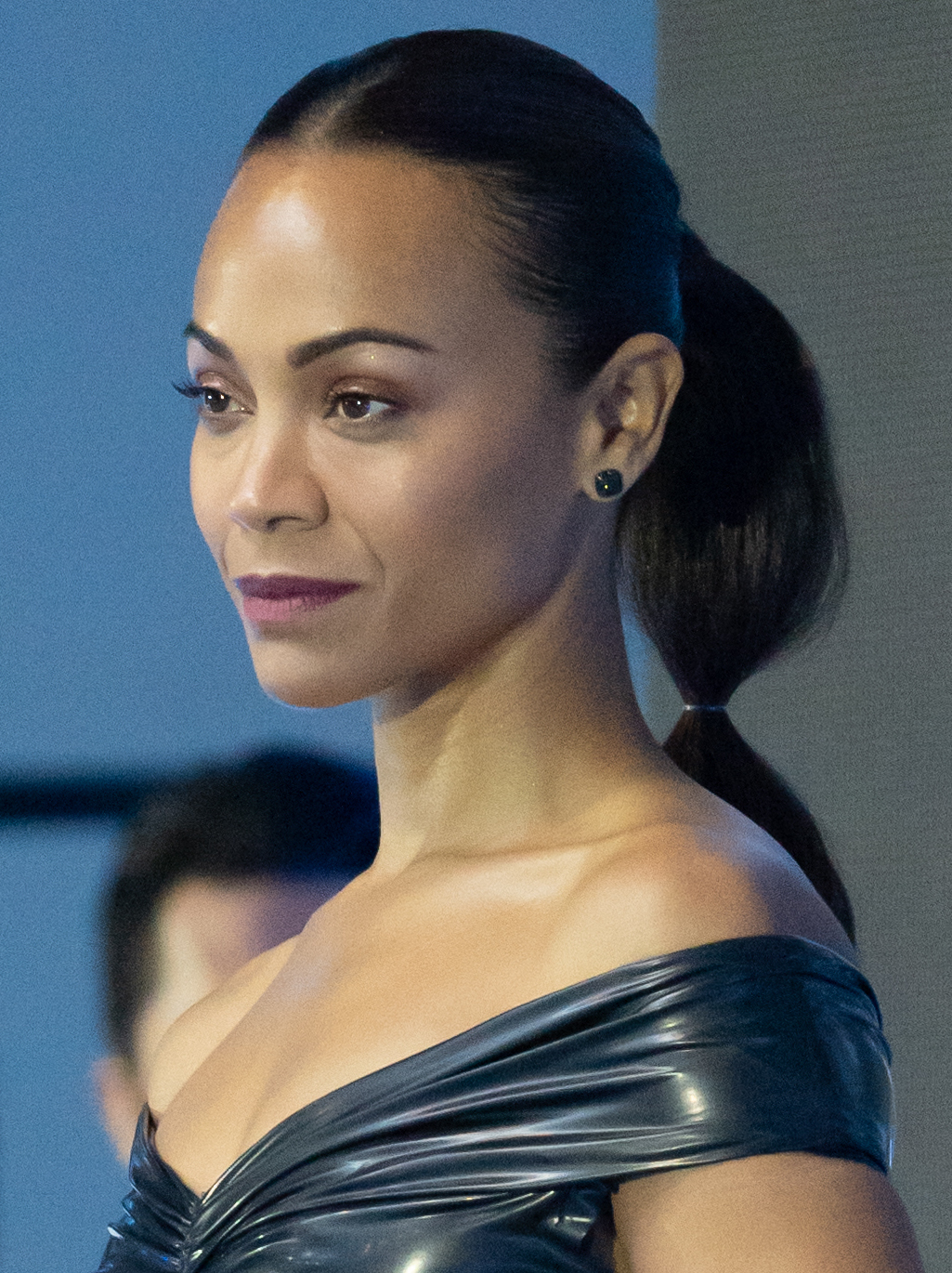
- Saldaña in 2022
Awards and nominations
Award	Wins	Nominations
Academy Awards	1	1
Actor Awards	1	2
BAFTA Awards	1	1
Critics' Choice Awards	2	8
Golden Globe Awards	1	1

Totals (Note: Certain award groups do not simply award one winner. They acknowledge several different recipients, have runners-up, and have third place. Since this is a specific recognition and is different from losing an award, runner-up mentions are considered wins in this award tally. For simplification and to avoid errors, each award in this list has been presumed to have had a prior nomination.)
- Wins: 38
- Nominations: 123

The following is a list of awards and nominations for Zoe Saldaña.

Saldaña is an American actress known for her roles in film franchises. She has received various accolades, including an Academy Award, a BAFTA Award, a Cannes Film Festival Award, two Critics' Choice Awards, a Golden Globe Award, and a Screen Actors Guild Award.

Known mostly for her work in science fiction film franchises, she first gained recognition for the 2009 film Star Trek, for which she was nominated for the BET and Black Reel awards for Best Actress, as well as the People's Choice Award for Favorite Female Breakout Star.

In 2024, she garnered acclaim for her performance in Jacques Audiard's musical crime comedy film Emilia Pérez, winning her many accolades including the Academy Award for Best Supporting Actress, Golden Globe Award for Best Supporting Actress – Motion Picture, BAFTA Award for Best Actress in a Supporting Role, and Screen Actors Guild Award for Outstanding Performance by a Female Actor in a Supporting Role. She also received the Cannes Film Festival Award for Best Actress, alongside her co-stars Karla Sofía Gascón, Selena Gomez and Adriana Paz.

== Major associations ==
=== Academy Awards ===
Year	Category	Nominated work	Result	Ref.
2025	Best Supporting Actress	Emilia Pérez	Won	

=== Actor Awards ===
Year	Category	Nominated work	Result	Ref.
2025	Outstanding Performance by a Female Actor in a Supporting Role	Emilia Pérez	Won	
2025	Outstanding Cast in a Motion Picture	Emilia Pérez	Nominated (Note: Shared with Karla Sofía Gascón, Selena Gomez, and Adriana Paz.)	

=== BAFTA Awards ===
Year	Category	Nominated work	Result	Ref.
British Academy Film Awards
2025	Best Actress in a Supporting Role	Emilia Pérez	Won	

=== César Awards ===
Year	Category	Nominated work	Result	Ref.
2025	Best Actress	Emilia Pérez	Nominated	

=== Critics' Choice Awards ===
Year	Category	Nominated work	Result	Ref.
Critics' Choice Movie Awards
2010	Best Acting Ensemble	Star Trek	Nominated (Note: Shared with the cast.)	
2015	Best Actress in an Action Movie	Guardians of the Galaxy	Nominated	
2025	Best Supporting Actress	Emilia Pérez	Won	
2025	Best Acting Ensemble	Emilia Pérez	Nominated	
Critics' Choice Super Awards
2023	Best Actress in a Science Fiction/Fantasy Movie	Avatar: The Way of Water	Nominated	
2024	Best Actress in a Superhero Movie	Guardians of the Galaxy Vol. 3	Nominated	
2024	Best Actress in an Action Series	Special Ops: Lioness	Won	
2025	Best Actress in an Action Series	Special Ops: Lioness	Nominated	

=== Golden Globe Awards ===
Year	Category	Nominated work	Result	Ref.
2025	Best Supporting Actress – Motion Picture	Emilia Pérez	Won	

== Miscellaneous awards ==
Organizations	Year	Category	Nominated work	Result	Ref.
ALMA Awards	2009	Actress in Film	Star Trek	Nominated	
ALMA Awards	2010	Favorite Movie Actress – Drama / Adventure	Takers	Nominated	
ALMA Awards	2011	Favorite Movie Actress – Drama / Adventure	Colombiana	Won	
Black Reel Awards	2006	Outstanding Actress in a Motion Picture	Guess Who	Nominated	
Black Reel Awards	2011	Outstanding Actress in a Motion Picture	Star Trek	Nominated	
Black Reel Awards	2012	Outstanding Actress in a Motion Picture	Colombiana	Nominated	
Black Reel Awards	2015	Best Supporting Actress	Guardians of the Galaxy	Nominated	
Black Reel Awards	2015	Outstanding Voice Performance	The Book of Life	Nominated	
Black Reel Awards	2015	Outstanding Actress, TV Movie of Limited Series	Rosemary's Baby	Nominated	
Black Reel Awards	2015	Outstanding Television Movie or Limited Series	Rosemary's Baby	Nominated	
Black Reel Awards	2022	Outstanding Voice Performance	Vivo	Nominated	
Black Reel Awards	2023	Outstanding Voice Performance	Avatar: The Way of Water	Won	
Black Reel Awards	2025	Outstanding Supporting Performance	Emilia Pérez	Nominated	
Black Reel Awards	2025	Outstanding Original Song	Emilia Pérez	Nominated	
Black Reel Awards	2025	Outstanding Lead Performance, Drama Series	Lioness	Nominated	
Black Reel Awards	2026	Outstanding Voice Performance	Avatar: Fire and Ash	Won	
Cannes Film Festival	2024	Best Actress	Emilia Pérez	Won	
MTV Movie & TV Awards	2003	Best Kiss	Drumline	Nominated (Note: Shared with Nick Cannon.)	
MTV Movie & TV Awards	2010	Best Female Performance	Avatar	Nominated	
MTV Movie & TV Awards	2010	Best Kiss	Avatar	Nominated (Note: Shared with Sam Worthington.)	
MTV Movie & TV Awards	2015	Best On-Screen Transformation	Guardians of the Galaxy	Nominated	
NAACP Image Awards	2006	Outstanding Actress in a Motion Picture	Guess Who	Nominated	
NAACP Image Awards	2010	Outstanding Supporting Actress in a Motion Picture	Avatar	Nominated	
NAACP Image Awards	2011	Outstanding Actress in a Motion Picture	The Losers	Nominated	
NAACP Image Awards	2012	Outstanding Actress in a Motion Picture	Colombiana	Nominated	
NAACP Image Awards	2015	Outstanding Character Voice-Over Performance	The Book of Life	Nominated	
NAACP Image Awards	2016	Outstanding Actress in a Motion Picture	Infinitely Polar Bear	Nominated	
NAACP Image Awards	2023	Outstanding Actress in a Television Movie, Mini-Series or Dramatic Special	From Scratch	Nominated	
NAACP Image Awards	2024	Outstanding Actress in a Drama Series	Lioness	Nominated	
NAACP Image Awards	2025	Outstanding Actress in a Drama Series	Lioness	Nominated	
People's Choice Awards	2010	Favorite Female Breakout Star	Star Trek	Nominated	
People's Choice Awards	2015	Favorite Action Movie Actress	Guardians of the Galaxy	Nominated	
People's Choice Awards	2017	Favorite Action Movie Actress	Star Trek Beyond	Nominated	
Satellite Awards	2025	Best Actress in a Supporting Role – Motion Picture	Emilia Pérez	Nominated	

== Other associations ==
Year	Association	Category	Work	Result	Ref.
2005	Teen Choice Awards	Choice Movie: Female Breakout Star	Guess Who	Nominated	
2009	Boston Society of Film Critics	Best Ensemble Cast	Star Trek	Won	
2009	Teen Choice Awards	Choice Movie Actress: Action	Star Trek	Nominated	
2009	Washington D.C. Area Film Critics Association	Best Ensemble	Star Trek	Nominated	
2009	Scream Awards	Best Science Fiction Actress	Star Trek	Nominated	
2009	Scream Awards	Breakout Performance – Female	Star Trek	Nominated	
2009	Scream Awards	Best Ensemble	Star Trek	Nominated	
2009	BET Awards	Best Actress	Avatar / Star Trek	Nominated	
2009	Empire Awards	Best Actress	Avatar	Won	
2009	Nickelodeon Kids' Choice Awards	Cutest Couple	Avatar	Nominated	
2009	Nickelodeon Kids' Choice Awards	Favorite Movie Actress	Avatar	Nominated	
2009	Scream Awards	Best Science Fiction Actress	Avatar	Nominated	
2009	Saturn Awards	Best Actress	Avatar	Won	
2009	Teen Choice Awards	Choice Movie Actress: Sci-Fi	Avatar	Won	
2009	Teen Choice Awards	Choice Movie Actress: Action	The Losers	Nominated	
2009	Teen Choice Awards	Choice Movie Actress: Comedy	Death at a Funeral	Nominated	
2011	BET Awards	Best Actress	Death at a Funeral	Nominated	
2011	BET Awards	Best Actress	The Losers	Nominated	
2012	BET Awards	Best Actress	Colombiana	Nominated	
2012	Teen Choice Awards	Choice Movie Actress: Action	Colombiana	Won	
2013	Teen Choice Awards	Choice Summer Movie Star: Female	Star Trek Into Darkness	Nominated	
2015	Imagen Foundation Awards	Best Actress – Feature Film	Guardians of the Galaxy	Won	
2016	Nickelodeon Kids' Choice Awards	Favorite Butt-Kicker	Star Trek Beyond	Nominated	
2016	Teen Choice Awards	Choice Movie Actress: AnTEENcipated	Star Trek Beyond	Nominated	
2017	Teen Choice Awards	Choice Movie Actress: Sci-Fi	Guardians of the Galaxy Vol. 2	Won	
2017	Teen Choice Awards	Choice MovieShip	Guardians of the Galaxy Vol. 2	Nominated (Note: Shared with Chris Pratt.)	
2018	Teen Choice Awards	Choice Liplock	Avengers: Infinity War	Nominated	
2018	Teen Choice Awards	Choice Actress: Action	Avengers: Infinity War	Nominated	
2019	Nickelodeon Kids' Choice Awards	Favorite Movie Actress	Avengers: Infinity War	Nominated	
2019	Nickelodeon Kids' Choice Awards	Favorite Butt-Kicker	Avengers: Infinity War	Nominated	
2019	Teen Choice Awards	Choice Actress: Action	Avengers: Endgame	Nominated	
2022	Hollywood Music in Media Awards	Best Original Song in a Feature Film	Avatar: The Way of Water	Nominated	
2022	Washington D.C. Area Film Critics Association Awards	Best Motion Capture Performance	Avatar: The Way of Water	Won	
2023	Austin Film Critics Association Awards	Best Voice Acting/Animated/Digital Performance	Avatar: The Way of Water	Nominated	
2023	Hollywood Critics Association Awards	Best Voice or Motion-Capture Performance	Avatar: The Way of Water	Nominated	
2023	Latino Entertainment Journalists Association	Best Voice or Motion Capture Performance	Avatar: The Way of Water	Nominated	
2023	Asia Content Awards & Global OTT Awards	Best Lead Actress	Special Ops: Lioness	Nominated	
2024	Astra Film Awards	Best Supporting Actress	Emilia Pérez	Won (Note: Tied with Ariana Grande.)	
2024	Celebration of Cinema and Television	Groundbreaker Award	Emilia Pérez	Honored	
2024	Chicago Film Critics Association Awards	Best Supporting Actress	Emilia Pérez	Nominated	
2024	Dallas–Fort Worth Film Critics Association Awards	Best Supporting Actress	Emilia Pérez	Won	
2024	Elle's Women in Hollywood Celebration	The Risk Takers	Emilia Pérez	Honored	
2024	Florida Film Critics Circle Awards	Best Supporting Actress	Emilia Pérez	Won	
2024	Hollywood Music in Media Awards	Original Song – Feature Film	"El Mal" (for Emilia Pérez)	Nominated	
2024	Hollywood Music in Media Awards	Song – Onscreen Performance (Film)	"El Mal" (for Emilia Pérez)	Won	
2024	Middleburg Film Festival	Spotlight Actor Award	Emilia Pérez	Honored	
2024	Mill Valley Film Festival	Outstanding Ensemble Performance	Emilia Pérez	Honored	
2024	New York Film Critics Online Awards	Best Supporting Actress	Emilia Pérez	Nominated	
2024	San Francisco Bay Area Film Critics Circle Awards	Best Supporting Actress	Emilia Pérez	Nominated	
2024	SCAD Savannah Film Festival	Vanguard Award	Emilia Pérez	Honored	
2024	St. Louis Film Critics Association Awards	Best Supporting Actress	Emilia Pérez	Nominated	
2024	Toronto Film Critics Association Awards	Outstanding Supporting Performance	Emilia Pérez	Runner-up	
2024	Washington D.C. Area Film Critics Association Awards	Best Supporting Actress	Emilia Pérez	Nominated	
2025	AACTA International Awards	Best Supporting Actress	Emilia Pérez	Won	
2025	Alliance of Women Film Journalists	Best Actress in a Supporting Role	Emilia Pérez	Nominated	
2025	Austin Film Critics Association Awards	Best Voice Acting/Animated/Digital Performance	Avatar: Fire and Ash	Nominated	
2025	Capri Hollywood International Film Festival	Best Ensemble Cast	Emilia Pérez	Honored	
2025	Costume Designers Guild Awards	Spotlight Award	Emilia Pérez	Honored	
2025	Georgia Film Critics Association Awards	Best Supporting Actress	Emilia Pérez	Nominated	
2025	Kansas City Film Critics Circle Awards	Best Supporting Actress	Emilia Pérez	Nominated	
2025	London Film Critics' Circle Awards	Supporting Actress of the Year	Emilia Pérez	Won	
2025	London Film Critics' Circle Awards	Derek Malcolm Award for Innovation	—	Honored	
2025	Online Film Critics Society Awards	Best Supporting Actress	Emilia Pérez	Nominated	
2025	Palm Springs International Film Festival	Vanguard Award	Emilia Pérez	Honored	
2025	Paris Film Critics Association Awards	Best Supporting Actress	Emilia Pérez	Won	
2025	Santa Barbara International Film Festival	American Riviera Award	Emilia Pérez	Honored	
2025	Washington D.C. Area Film Critics Association Awards	Best Motion Capture Performance	Avatar: Fire and Ash	Won	
