= Celestina Harris =

American actress

- Born: May 14, 2013 (age 13); San Antonio, Texas
- Occupation: Actress
- Years active: 2021–present

Celestina Harris is an American actress. She is best known for playing Charlie in the Paramount+ spy thriller series Lioness. She later became best known for starring as Doozie in the Netflix series Gabby's Dollhouse and continues playing the same character in the show's spin-off Doozie's Doghouse.

== Early life ==
Harris was born in San Antonio, Texas. She became interested in acting due to her sisters involvement in theatre.

== Career ==
Harris committed to acting during the COVID-19 pandemic. Her first feature-length film role was as Young Grace in the independent drama movie I'll Be There which won the Audience Award at the Austin Film Festival. Her first big role came playing Lizzi in the crime series Dr. Death opposite Mandy Moore as her mom and Édgar Ramírez. Her biggest role so far has been playing Charlie in the Paramount+ series Lioness starring as Zoe Saldaña and Dave Annable's youngest daughter. She hopes in the future on top of acting she gets to work behind the camera as a screenwriter of director.

== Personal life ==
She draws sketches in her notebook. Her sports activities include soccer, swimming, and volleyball. She took swimming lessons to address a fear of being underwater. Her favourite films are The Greatest Showman and The Boss Baby.

== Filmography ==
=== Film ===
| Year | Title | Role | Notes |
|---|---|---|---|
| 2021 | Tea Party | Scarlett | Short |
| 2021 | The Robbery | Neke | Short |
| 2021 | Certain Doubt | Danielle | Short |
| 2022 | My Father's Day | Kayla | Short |
| 2023 | I'll Be There | Young Grace | |
| 2023 | Muneca | Nina | Short |
| 2023 | Yuletide the Knot | Maddie | |
| 2024 | Ice Cream Shop Girls | Bella | Short |
| 2024 | Rainbow World:The Movie | Kira, Daisy Madison | |

=== Television ===
| Year | Title | Role | Notes |
|---|---|---|---|
| 2021 | VID Chronicles | Noelle, Jada | 2 episodes |
| 2021-2022 | L.O.L. Surprise! House of Surprises | Jammin | 5 episodes |
| 2022 | Charm Words: Daily Affirmations for Kids | Child Narrator | 108 episodes |
| 2022 | Chicago P.D. | Cloey Fraser | Episode; The Real You |
| 2022 | Angelina | Mikayla | 5 episodes |
| 2022-2023 | Adventures of Cairo | Mandy | 24 episodes |
| 2023 | LOL Surprise! Tots Road Trip | Radio Star | Episode; Ghost Town Tricks |
| 2023 | Dr. Death | Lizzi | 7 episodes |
| 2024 | Project Rainbow | Daisy Madison | Episode; A Little Shorter |
| 2024-2025 | Rainbow High | Kira, Daisy Madison | 12 episodes |
| 2024 | Rainbow World | Kira, Daisy Madison | 7 episodes |
| 2024 | We Baby Bears | Lovely | Episode; Flounder Fam |
| 2023-2024 | Lioness | Charlie | 10 episodes |
| 2024 | Wonder Pets: In the City | Caribbean Crab | Episode; Help the Caribbean Crab!/Save the Bighorn Sheep! |
| 2024-2025 | Star Wars: Young Jedi Adventures | Myra | 2 episodes |
| 2026-present | Gabby's Dollhouse | Doozie | Main role |
| 2026-present | Doozie's Doghouse | Doozie | Main role |
