= Stephanie Nur =

Austrian actress born in Cairo, Egypt

- Born: April 14, 1988 (age 38); Cairo, Egypt
- Occupation: Actor

Stephanie Nur is an Austrian-Syrian actress. She is known for her roles in 1883, My Big Fat Greek Wedding 3, Lioness, and Mary.

== Biography ==
Nur was born in Cairo, Egypt to an Austrian father and a Syrian mother.

Nur played the character Jenny in the Austrian drama Risse im Beton. In 2021, she played the character Melodi in the first two episodes of Yellowstone-prequel 1883. She also played the Syrian refugee Qamar in My Big Fat Greek Wedding 3.

She may be best known for her role as Aaliyah Amrohi in Lioness. She received a positive review for her depiction of a wealthy, Middle Eastern woman, as well as her portrayal of the sapphic relationship between her and the protagonist.

In 2024, she portrayed Salome I in the film Mary.
