= Lioness (American TV series) =

American spy thriller television series

- Also known as: Special Ops: Lioness
- Genre: Action drama; Spy thriller
- Created by: Taylor Sheridan
- Showrunner: Taylor Sheridan
- Written by: Taylor Sheridan; Thomas Brady
- Starring: Zoe Saldaña; Laysla De Oliveira; Dave Annable; Jill Wagner; LaMonica Garrett; James Jordan; Austin Hébert; Jonah Wharton; Stephanie Nur; Hannah Love Lanier; Nicole Kidman; Morgan Freeman; Thad Luckinbill; Michael Kelly; Genesis Rodriguez
- Composer: Andrew Lockington
- Country of origin: United States
- Original language: English
- No. of seasons: 3
- No. of episodes: 24

Production
- Executive producers: Taylor Sheridan; Jill Wagner; David C. Glasser; David Hutkin; Bob Yari; Zoe Saldaña; Nicole Kidman; Geyer Kosinski
- Running time: 38–80 minutes
- Production companies: Bosque Ranch Productions; Cinestar; Blossom Films; 101 Studios; Paramount Television Studios (Note: Known as MTV Entertainment Studios for seasons 1–2)

Original release
- Network: Paramount+
- Release: July 23, 2023 – present

Lioness, also marketed as Special Ops: Lioness, (Note: The series was originally announced as Lioness, which used in the first season's title card. The "Special Ops" prefix was added for marketing purposes shortly before season 1's release, but was dropped as part of the season 2 renewal.) is an American spy thriller television series created by Taylor Sheridan that premiered on July 23, 2023, on Paramount+. The second season premiered on October 27, 2024. In October 2025, the series was renewed for a third season, which premiered on August 2, 2026.

Season 1 averaged a viewership of 3.5 million, Season 2 averaged one of 5.25 million and Season 3 averaged one of 8.5 million. The Season 3 finale set a series-breaking record of 9.7 million viewers, ranking the 5th all-time watched finale on Paramount+.

== Premise ==
A spy thriller that follows the leader of a CIA team that enlists female operatives, who are known as Lionesses, to go undercover in the war on terror.

== Cast and characters ==
=== Main ===
- Zoe Saldaña as Joe McNamara, a CIA senior case officer in charge of the Lioness program, who previously served as a Lioness operative responsible for the death of Abu Musab al-Zarqawi.
- Laysla De Oliveira as Cruz Manuelos, a Force Recon Marine and Lioness operative in the first season, turned Delta Force operator and Josephina's handler in the second season, and QRF team member in the third season. Note: While Delta Force is an Army unit, Marines can be and have been members of it. Later, in season 2, Joe alludes to Manuelos being promoted to Sergeant First Class, which is an Army rank, not Marine Corps.
- Dave Annable as Dr. Neal McNamara, Joe's husband and a pediatric oncology surgeon.
- Jill Wagner as "Bobby", a Ground Branch QRF team leader for the Lioness program.
- LaMonica Garrett as "Tucker", a QRF team member and former Marine.
- James Jordan as "Two Cups", a QRF team member and former Green Beret.
- Austin Hébert as "Randy", a QRF team member.
- Jonah Wharton as "Tex", a QRF team member and former Navy SEAL.
- Stephanie Nur as Aaliyah Amrohi (season 1; guest season 3), the daughter of a suspected terrorist financier.
- Hannah Love Lanier as Kate McNamara, the teenage daughter of Joe and Neal.
- Nicole Kidman as Kaitlyn Meade, a CIA Clandestine Service supervisor and Joe's boss.
- Morgan Freeman as Edwin Mullins, the U.S. Secretary of State. (Note: Although appearing in only two episodes in Season 1, Freeman is credited as "starring" in the opening credits for the episodes in which he appears.)
- Thad Luckinbill as Kyle McManus (season 2–present; recurring season 1), a CIA senior case officer and Joe's colleague.
- Michael Kelly as Byron Westfield (season 2–present; recurring season 1), the CIA's Deputy Director of Operations and Kaitlyn's boss, a former Marine and Desert Storm veteran.
- Genesis Rodriguez as Captain Josephina Carrillo (season 2–present), a U.S. Army Black Hawk pilot recruited into the Lioness program due to her family connection to the Mexican cartel that kidnapped an American congresswoman. In season 3, she joins the QRF team as their pilot.

=== Recurring ===
- Celestina Harris as Charlie McNamara, the younger daughter of Joe and Neal.
- Martin Donovan as Errol Meade, Kaitlyn's husband, a high-ranking financial investor.
- Matt Gerald as Cody J, a U.S Army Delta Force Operator
- Richard Haddad as Asif (season 1), the head of Aaliyah's security team.
- Bruce McGill as Monty Hollar (season 2–present; guest season 1), the National Security Advisor.
- Jennifer Ehle as Evelyn Mason (season 2–present; guest season 1), the White House Chief of Staff.
- Max Martini as "Tracer" (season 2), a U.S. Army Delta Force operator on loan to the QRF and Bobby's ex.
- Kirk Acevedo as Raymond Gutierrez (season 2), a DEA special agent.
- Elizaveta Neretin as Oleksandra Balakin (season 3), a Ukrainian FISU agent and mole in the Russian SVR.
- Lev Gorn as Maxim Petrov (season 3), the Deputy Russian Ambassador to the United States.

=== Guest ===
- Sean Avery (season 1) as U.S. Army Delta Force operator in a bar.
- Matt Gerald as Cody J, a U.S. Army Delta Force operator.
- Ian Bohen as Grady (season 3), a U.S. Army Delta Force operator and K9 handler.
- Ray Corasani as Ehsan Al Rashdi (season 1), Aaliyah's fiancé and a member of the Saudi royal family.
- Sam Asghari as Kamal Al Rashdi (season 1), Ehsan's cousin.
- Carla Mansour as Malika (season 1), one of Aaliyah's friends.
- Adam Budron as Sami (season 1), one of Aaliyah's friends.
- Michael Tow as Dr. Hammond (season 1), Neal's colleague.
- Bassem Youssef as Asmar Ali Amrohi (season 1), Aaliyah's father, a terrorist financier.
- Taylor Sheridan as Cody Spears (season 2–present), a U.S. Army Delta Force operator.
- Brandon Muirbrook as Dean (season 2), a U.S. Army Delta Force operator.
- Greyson Queso Kennedy as Pete Westfield (season 2), son of Byron Westfield.
- Patricia de Leon as Maria Carillo (season 2), Josephina's mother and Pablo's wife.
- Robyn Lively as Senator Amanda Albright (season 2), a member of the Senate Intelligence Committee.
- Annabeth Gish as Denise Westfield (season 2), Byron's wife.
- Dawn Olivieri as Amber Whalen (season 2–present), a CIA Clandestine Services Targeting Officer.
- Molly Searcy as a military nurse (season 3).

== Episodes ==
=== Series overview ===
Season	Episodes	Originally released	
Season	Episodes	First released	Last released
1	8	July 23, 2023	September 3, 2023
2	8	October 27, 2024	December 8, 2024
3	8	August 2, 2026	September 20, 2026

=== Season 1 (2023) ===
No. overall	No. in season	Title	Directed by	Written by	Original release date
1	1	"Sacrificial Soldiers"	John Hillcoat	Taylor Sheridan	July 23, 2023
Joe McNamara leads the CIA Directorate of Operations Lioness program, which has female operatives infiltrate enemy targets' inner circles by becoming close to women related to them, so the target can be located, drawn out and killed. A mission in ISIS controlled Syria goes awry, resulting in the death of her undercover operative. Meanwhile, Cruz Manuelos (a Catholic Syrian Mexican) escapes an abusive relationship in Oklahoma City by enlisting in the USMC, impressing trainers with her top ASVAB score and unusual physical capacity for a woman. Years later, Cruz is now a twice deployed Force Recon Marine, fluent in Arabic and undergoing insertion training. Joe recruits her for a covert operation targeting Asmar Ali Amrohi, an Iranian terrorist financier. At Camp Arifjan, Joe introduces Cruz to the team's QRF: Bobby, Two Cups, Tex, Tucker, and Randy. Despite her personal doubts, Cruz successfully initiates contact with Amrohi's daughter Aaliyah in Kuwait City, marking the beginning of her deep-cover assignment.
2	2	"The Beating"	John Hillcoat	Taylor Sheridan	July 23, 2023
Joe has Delta Force subject Cruz to intense and borderline illegal SERE training to prepare her for the mission's challenges and get an idea of her breaking point should she need to be rescued. Concurrently, Joe navigates family issues, such as her teenage daughter Kate's suspension from school for fighting a racist bully and her husband Neal's emotional strain from his work as a pediatric oncologist. Despite it focusing on and triggering serious past trauma, Cruz passes the training. Joe has her housed at Fort Bragg with the QRF, and warns that if she is discovered by Amrohi his men will put her through much worse. The QRF gets into a bar fight with the Delta operatives who tortured Cruz. Cruz deepens her relationship with Aaliyah, who invites her to spend more time together, while she is visiting the United States, a sign of growing trust.
3	3	"Bruise Like a Fist"	Anthony Byrne	Story by : Taylor Sheridan and Thomas Brady; Teleplay by : Taylor Sheridan	July 30, 2023
Cruz attends a party hosted by Aaliyah and her friends in Chesapeake, Maryland, following Joe's guidance to gather intelligence. She tells Aaliyah the SERE injuries were caused by a car accident. Cruz carefully navigates the social dynamics, aiming to solidify her position within Aaliyah's friendship circle. Aaliyah, who is socially liberal, opens up to Cruz about feeling suffocated by her family controlling her life. During her stay, Cruz is monitored by Joe and the QRF and also background checked by Amrohi’s men guarding Aaliyah. Joe and Kaitlyn Meade, the Lioness CIA supervisor, discuss the mission's progress and potential risks, considering the possibility that Aaliyah's openness might be a trap. Joe lets CIA colleague Kyle McManus borrow Tucker, Two Cups and Randy to extract a cartel asset from a prisoner transport in Texas. Kyle uses an EMP to disable the van, but the group end up causing a crash and shooting cartel members sent to kill the asset, which is captured on CCTV. Aaliyah invites Cruz onto her private jet.
4	4	"The Choice of Failure"	Anthony Byrne	Taylor Sheridan	August 6, 2023
Cruz flies with Aaliyah and her group to East Hampton. Joe learns of Aaliyah's arranged marriage to Ehsan Al Rashdi, a Saudi royal, raising suspicions about the union's true purpose. Kyle is admonished by Meade and Deputy Director of Operations Byron Westfield for the extraction, but he tells them his asset confirmed the Sinaloa Cartel is smuggling five Al-Qaeda operatives into San Antonio, where he had planned on taking them out. Kate is injured in a car crash resulting in an unexpected pregnancy terminating, causing further turmoil in the McNamara family. Cruz faces a dangerous situation when she is separated from Aaliyah and a man attempts to date rape her at a club, but is rescued by the QRF. The incident leads to doubts about her readiness, but Cruz provides critical information about Aaliyah's upcoming wedding in Dubai, reaffirming her value to the mission. Meade also reprimands Joe for lending Kyle the QRF, and confirms her men were captured on Border Patrol cameras during the extraction.
5	5	"Truth Is the Shrewdest Lie"	Paul Cameron	Taylor Sheridan	August 13, 2023
Westfield warns Joe that her QRF team are controlled by him, and she does not get to deploy them without his authorisation. To smooth things over with Department of Homeland Security and stop them investigating the illegal extraction, Meade negotiates to have the CIA capture the Al-Qaeda cell in San Antonio. However, it changes to a kill mission when they discover the men are planning to suicide bomb a sporting event. The QRF, Cruz, Joe and Kyle terminate the cell dressed as ATF SRT operators, and Border Patrol EOD then performs a controlled detonation of the explosives. Joe briefly visits Kate as she recovers from surgery to her femur. Watching the news from San Antonio and noticing a scratch on Joe's face, Neal becomes disturbed at the implication his wife has killed people. Cruz resumes contact with Aaliyah after being separated in the Hamptons. Aaliyah asks her to come back and visit her alone, and appears to flirt with her by comparing their friendship to Lady and the Tramp.
6	6	"The Lie Is the Truth"	Paul Cameron	Taylor Sheridan	August 20, 2023
At a debrief in the White House, Westfield, Meade, Joe and Kyle face scrutiny from White House Chief of Staff Mason, National Security Advisor Hollar and Secretary of State Edwin Mullins, for their unsanctioned operations in Texas. As a result, Mullins confirms the executive will supervise the eventual kill mission of Amrohi from the Situation Room, taking over from the CIA. Meade tells Joe the administration is reluctant to take Amrohi out due to the possible destabilisation his death could cause. When local burglars break into the house used by the QRF to monitor Cruz, they are captured. Joe calls in her favor from Kyle, who threatens and gives them hush money for their silence. Cruz spends a weekend with Aaliyah at a mansion in The Hamptons, which deepens their bond and culminates in a passionate kiss. Cruz's growing closeness to Aaliyah causes her to grapple with the implications of her undercover role. Aaliyah tells Cruz the wedding destination has been changed to Mallorca, Spain.
7	7	"Wish the Fight Away"	John Hillcoat	Taylor Sheridan	August 27, 2023
Aaliyah invites Cruz to her pre-wedding festivities in New York City and the two grow closer. Joe, Meade, Westfield and the QRF prepare for the mission's final phase, renting a yacht and coordinating logistics with the United States Navy for Cruz's extraction. After a night of sex with Aaliyah, Cruz confronts her feelings, questioning the morality of her assignment and her loyalty to the mission, briefly disabling her transmitter. Kyle, who has been monitoring Cruz, tells Joe about her relationship with Aaliyah. Joe advises Cruz any relationship with Aaliyah is doomed to fail due to her impending marriage. She reminds Cruz she has already killed many fathers in combat, and that Aaliyah's father has been funding every conflict in the Middle East since 9/11. Cruz reluctantly agrees to put her feelings for Aaliyah aside and resume the mission. Meade discusses the possible implications of Amrohi's death with her financier husband Errol, before deploying to Spain with the Lioness team to oversee the mission.
8	8	"Gone Is the Illusion of Order"	John Hillcoat	Taylor Sheridan	September 3, 2023
Westfield convinces the executive there is no other option than to take out Amrohi, despite their reservations. Cruz attends Aaliyah's wedding in Palma, intending to neutralize Amrohi. She faces hostility from Ehsan for her outspokenness and close relationship with Aaliyah, and he carries out further checks on her. Aaliyah and Cruz kiss and talk in Cruz's room, then Cruz says she can't do this and steps out to get water from the kitchen. When a historic photo from her high school track and field competition is uploaded to social media, Ehsan discovers Cruz's true identity through facial recognition and links her to the Marines via a Parris Island graduation photo. He confronts her just as she finally meets Amrohi alone that evening in the kitchen by chance. Cruz brutally kills both men with a kitchen knife and is rescued by the QRF, but is emotionally shattered, leading to a physical confrontation with Joe during extraction. The operation's fallout prompts Joe to reconsider her role in the Lioness program. Cruz severs ties, condemning the mission's ethical costs and arguing they just made the next generation of terrorists.

=== Season 2 (2024) ===
No. overall	No. in season	Title	Directed by	Written by	Original release date
9	1	"Beware the Old Soldier"	Taylor Sheridan	Taylor Sheridan	October 27, 2024
Los Tigres cartel operatives abduct Texas Congresswoman Hernandez, killing her husband and son. After a meeting with NSA Hollar, Chief of Staff Mason and Secretary of State Mullins, Meade and Westfield task Joe and Kyle to carry out an open extraction, and also recruit a new Lioness for their Mexican focus in three weeks. It is also determined China is influencing Mexico and the cartels, as if it is discovered the US deployed military forces there to rescue Hernandez it would make the country look hypocritical to the UN should they object to China ever invading Taiwan. Joe and Kyle link with a covert operations team led by SGM Cody Spears. Despite getting into a gunfight with corrupt members of the Guardia Nacional and Mexican Army working for the cartel on the Rio Grande, the team extracts Hernandez to safety with help from Border Patrol, but loses a man from Spears' team. Joe argues with Kyle and then calls Neal, affirming her love for her family.
10	2	"I Love My Country"	Taylor Sheridan	Taylor Sheridan	October 27, 2024
The CIA confirms Los Tigres, led by Alvaro Carrillo, was behind the Hernandez abduction at the behest of the Chinese MSS. They plan to infiltrate the cartel and kill the MSS agent who is working with it to pull strings and also facilitate sale of black market oil to China. After getting the approval from Mullins, Meade and Westfield instruct Joe to recruit Captain Josephina Carrillo, a U.S. Army helicopter pilot and Alvaro's niece. They plan to have Carrillo dishonorably discharged so she returns to her father Pablo, a lawyer and cartel money launderer in Texas, to be recruited by her uncle as a pilot. Tracer, Bobby's ex, joins the QRF. Joe and the QRF's arrival in Iraq to meet Carrillo results in a gunfight with ISIS insurgents, and three soldiers under Carrillo's command are killed. This leads to a physical altercation between Joe and Carrillo. Despite initial resistance, Carrillo is persuaded to join the operation, assuring Joe she is estranged from her uncle, doesn't even speak Spanish and is loyal to the United States.
11	3	"Along Came a Spider"	Michael Friedman	Taylor Sheridan	November 3, 2024
The CIA has Carrillo accused of friendly fire in Iraq to get her discharged, and bugs her fathers house. Joe doesn't trust Carrillo's backstory, so Meade suggests treating her like a double agent. Carrillo arrives at Fort Bliss and undergoes CQB training with the QRF to work with the Lioness team. When explaining the mission to Carrillo, Joe and Kyle trick her into revealing she lied about speaking Spanish and knowing her father and uncle's cartel affiliation, accusing her of joining to act as a mole. Carrillo tearfully assures them her loyalty is to the US over everything, and she abhors her family's criminal dealings. Joe forces her to prove it by making Carrillo call her father and asking to visit. The White House grows cagey about the plan due to low approval ratings and lack of bipartisan support for action against Mexico after the Hernandez kidnapping, partly because the Congresswoman was a Republican. Mullins has Meade and Westfield convince two Democratic senators to reverse their cautious positions.
12	4	"Five Hundred Children"	Michael Friedman	Taylor Sheridan	November 10, 2024
Due to concerns about Carrillo's loyalty, Joe is told to recruit an operative to shadow her throughout the mission. She has a reluctant Cruz, now a Delta Force SFC, assigned to the team to do this due to her past experience and loyalty. To Joe's chagrin, Meade and Westfield order the team to liaise with the DEA after a special agent, Raymond Gutierrez, is caught tailing her and demands to be included in the fight against the cartel. They plan to destroy a Los Tigres warehouse in Mexico whilst impersonating a rival cartel, and Carrillo becomes more familiar with the CIA's unorthodox tactics. After arriving at the warehouse with Gutierrez, the QRF discover after killing the guards it is being used for sex trafficking. Cruz is disgusted when Joe tells her they can't logistically rescue any of the victims. Against orders, Joe places a tracking device in the shoe of a young child. After gunning down three cars of corrupt police officers en-route to the warehouse as backup, Carrillo exfils the team in a Little Bird.
13	5	"Shatter the Moon"	Stephen Kay	Taylor Sheridan	November 17, 2024
Cruz and Joe work on getting Carrillo on side. Knowing her qualms about betraying her family, Joe offers her the chance to turn her father against her uncle, so they can instead be put in witness protection. The mission will then continue as planned against Alvaro and the MSS. Joe considers training Cruz to replace her at the CIA due to her developing skillset. Carrillo visits her father in Dallas, with Cruz pretending to be her girlfriend. He questions why the Army, which he believes has been captured by leftist ideology, would fire a female pilot. Randy, Tex and Two Cups determine Pablo has security in a neighbouring property. Meade and Westfield refuse to authorize a rescue mission for the children. Joe defies orders and works with the remainder of the QRF, Kyle and Gutierrez to track and intercept them at the border. However, they are attacked by several cartel gunmen, IED's and explosive drones, which kill several of Gutierrez's DEA SRT colleagues. When approaching the children, a coyote detonates a suicide vest.
14	6	"2381"	Stephen Kay	Taylor Sheridan	November 24, 2024
Carrillo reveals the truth to Pablo, but when he attacks her Cruz intervenes. Randy, Tex and Two Cups kill Pablo's bodyguards and detain him. They discover a wire on the maid, who claims to work for Gutierrez, and inform Joe and Kyle. Believing Gutierrez is working for the cartel, not helped by the fact he didn’t declare the informant, Kyle subjects him to enhanced interrogation. Gutierrez protests his innocence to Meade, claiming he recruited the maid off book so the cartel wouldn't find out via their moles in law enforcement. She orders him to given Methylphenidate and polygraphed to see if he is telling the truth. After the border incident, Joe is summoned to DC. On the plane, she discovers she was shot and has internal bleeding. Believing she is dying, Joe calls Neal to say goodbye, traumatising him. She is treated at Keesler AFB before being transferred to Walter Reed. Meade and Westfield decide to take an alternative approach with Pablo to avoid further collateral damage given his reluctance to work with the CIA.
15	7	"The Devil Has Aces"	Stephen Kay	Taylor Sheridan	December 1, 2024
Westfield tells Mullins the border attack was coordinated by Iran to distract from the fact they are working with China to provide scientists for their nuclear program. Mullins suggests they arrange a black-op to show Iran its borders can be interfered with also. Westfield arranges for the Lioness team, supported by the military, to kill the Chinese scientists on Iranian soil as they are transported to Isfahan. He orders Joe to coordinate the mission from the base in Sulaymaniyah so she isn't captured in Iran. After questioning Gutierrez, Kyle determines he is innocent, with the only crime he ever committed being killing a corrupt colleague who tried to recruit him to work for the cartel. Meade convinces him to remain on side and see the mission through instead of reporting the torture. Carrillo stays with Cruz at Fort Liberty, where the two grow closer and sleep together. Pablo is relocated to a black site in Costa Rica. Joe and Neal fight over her not prioritizing their daughters and taking risks despite recovering from her injuries.
16	8	"The Compass Points Home"	Stephen Kay	Taylor Sheridan	December 8, 2024
The team is warned in a briefing that the Iranian Armed Forces have a well equipped unit in the area. Carrillo bombs the convoy with Cruz as her door gunner, and Cody returns to provide sniper support. Meade and Westfield offer Pablo and his family protection in exchange for him taking over Los Tigres, provided he refuses to work with their enemies, shares info and runs the cartel stateside. Pablo executes Alvaro at his Monterrey compound and assumes leadership of the cartel, allowing the CIA to take the MSS agent into custody. The attack kills the scientists, but the helicopter is shot down and Carrillo breaks her leg. The team, including Joe and Cody, deploys to extract them, but are quickly overwhelmed by IRGC reinforcements. Bobby, Two Cups and Tucker are injured, and the rest prepare to commit suicide to avoid capture, but are rescued last minute by the 82nd Airborne and a Delta Force team. Back in the US, an emotional Joe is greeted by Neal, who tells her she will always have a home to return to.

=== Season 3 (2026) ===
No. overall	No. in season	Title	Directed by	Written by	Original release date
17	1	"The Spider and the Fly"	Michael Friedman	Taylor Sheridan	August 2, 2026
After having breakfast with her family, Joe is abducted in broad daylight whilst on the phone with Meade. Six months prior: The CIA is approached by Oleksandra Balakin, a Ukrainian FISU agent and long term mole in the Russian SVR. She offers the location of Aleksi Yurimov, leader of Putin's hybrid warfare Special Services Department. On the frontlines of Donetsk, Joe is inserted with Spears and her Delta Force colleagues to identify and capture him, whilst Kyle and the Lioness QRF are sidelined. Joe insists on having Cruz accompany her with Spears team. With support from SBU Alpha Group, they navigate a maze of trenches and kill numerous North Korean soldiers protecting Yurimov with the help of Combat Assault Dogs. Yurimov is captured and extracted behind Ukrainian lines, but Titan, a dog belonging to Spears' colleague Grady is killed. Joe is later forced to gun down two men impersonating Virginia State Police detectives when they try to break into her home, much to Neal's shock.
18	2	"No Sorrow Like the Survivor"	Michael Friedman	Taylor Sheridan	August 9, 2026
Joe reluctantly reveals the location of her tracking implant to her captors, revealed to be Russian, after they strip her naked and threaten to torture her. Meade and Westfield scramble the QRF and Cody’s team to locate her. Kyle and Kaitlyn identify the dead impersonators as Belarusian SVR contractors. Using their FBI credentials, the Lioness team capture a further two operatives and kill one outside Joe’s house, including a naturalized American sleeper agent. Westfield confronts and threatens retaliation against Deputy Ambassador Maxim Petrov at a D.C. restaurant. At a debrief at the White House with Mullins, Mason and Hollar, it is determined the attack on Joe is in response to Yurimov’s capture, but that the SVR does not know the full nature of Joe's job and involvement. Joe says that based on Occam's razor it is most likely that Balakin set them up, and doubts the man now detained in Jordan is really Yurimov. Kyle, Cruz and Tex take Balakin into custody. Joe’s family are relocated to Camp Peary under QRF guard, and after returning from the debrief she breaks down in Neal's arms.
19	3	"The Bear Is Infected"	Michael Friedman	Taylor Sheridan	August 16, 2026
Joe is subjected to Chinese water torture by Renat, the leader of her Russian captors. Despite Kyle threatening her family in Kyiv, Balakin insists she is not a triple agent and hates the Russian Federation. She remarks the failed attack on Joe was an SVR probe to confirm her importance they only previously suspected. Joe reluctantly brings her on side. In a briefing with the Lioness team, Balakin explains her role in the SVR is to manage American assets recruited for counterintelligence via similar honeypot schemes. They discover five of her high level assets are Senators, and against Joe's wishes the CIA elect to keep Balakin actively in the SVR instead of pulling her out. Still believing Balakin either is responsible for or works the asset who helped facilitate the attack on her family, Joe gets Westfield to have the White House Press Secretary announce the capture of an unnamed Russian agent, hoping the response will expose further SVR operatives and assets stateside.
20	4	"Murder Hornets"	D.J. Caruso	Taylor Sheridan	August 23, 2026
The White House is briefed on worst case scenarios of Joe’s capture. Russia will likely release details obtained of past Lioness missions to sabotage strategic US relationships with allies, then give her to Iran to be convicted of war crimes. (Note: Specifically the killing of civilian Chinese nuclear scientists and numerous Iranian soldiers on Iranian soil as part of Operation Sky Hawk in “The Compass Points Home”) If she is not publicly executed, Iran likely passes her to Hezbollah to put pressure on Israel. Despite tracking the diplomatic vehicle used to transport her, Joe is flown from Baltimore International Airport ten minutes before the QRF arrives. Kyle breaks the ROE by executing a restrained SVR agent to get the tail number, concerning the QRF. Westfield reluctantly advises Mullins to offer Yurimov’s release in exchange for Joe. Meade warns Neal to prepare for the worst option that Joe will not come back alive. The Lioness team starts to approach now jumpy SVR assets, planning to offer them a way out in exchange for identifying their handlers. Meade and Westfield have a tense meeting with Petrov about the capture of Yurimov.
21	5	"The Idiot Army"	Robert McLachlan	Taylor Sheridan	August 30, 2026
The plane transporting Joe lands at an airfield in Texas, where she is moved to a car and driven away. The team arrest Charlotte, a stripper who blackmails influential men, and Cade McWeaver, a Booz Allen software engineer and capture their handlers. Westfield informs the White House that Balakin’s sources also include high ranking press and TV editors, judges and members of Congress. It is decided the congressional assets be forced to resign and become CIA sources in exchange for not being prosecuted for treason. Joe also discovers that McWeaver and his handler, a Chinese MSS contract agent, were activated by Professor Richard Ealy, a communist sympathizer, who is arrested. Before sending him to Guantanamo Bay, Kyle urges one of the captured handlers to divulge who planned the attack on Joe. Talking with Neal, Joe remarks that for the last fifty years the United States enemies have been utilising useful idiots like the assets they captured to target and weaken them.
22	6	"Sugar Land"	D.J. Caruso	Taylor Sheridan	September 6, 2026
With Russia’s formal operations crippled six months prior, Balakin theorises a rogue SVR officer is being paid by Iran to deliver Joe, and will fly her from a FBO in Texas. She gives the CIA details of safehouses in the area, including the city of Sugar Land. The QRF, Delta Force and local law enforcement mobilise. Kyle, Goose and Grady locate the jet and kill the flight crew in a gunfight. This forces Renat to hand Joe over to Babat, his Iranian benefactor, who cuts off her toe and prepares her for alternative extraction. In a successful counterespionage operation, numerous American assets are arrested by FBI Counterintelligence, and hundreds of diplomats from the Russian Embassy get expelled. Senator Ryan Olson, an asset on the Foreign Relations Committee, commits vehicular suicide after being confronted by Mullins, Meade, Westfield and Joe. The McNamara family returns home, believing they are safe. Kyle suggests recruiting Balakin, believing the SVR will find her current witness protection location and kill her.
23	7	"Kiss the Girls"	Michael Friedman	Taylor Sheridan	September 13, 2026
Westfield tells the White House that Iran likely is behind Joe’s kidnapping as vengeance for Operation Sky Hawk. After being pulled over for a minor traffic infraction, the Iranians get in a shootout with local police. Joe escapes and is rescued by the QRF, who gun down the kidnappers. Errol tells Kaitlyn his think tank has been hired by the State Department to determine the most likely perpetrator. They deduced it is actually Ukraine, who would benefit most from US direct action against Russia and Iran, either via a ceasefire or continued funding. She and Westfield brief Mullins, explaining that Balakin likely provided the valuable intel as part of this longer game. Westfield urges Mullins to release Yurimov as a sign of good faith to Moscow, and authorise Balakin’s assassination. Kaitlyn tells Neal that Joe is alive, and implies she will be removed from fieldwork. Joe is unable to face her family, and after being released from hospital goes directly to CIA headquarters, vowing to kill those responsible for her traumatic ordeal.
24	8	"The Unravelling"	Michael Friedman	Taylor Sheridan	September 20, 2026
With NSA support, Kyle tails lobbyist Dmitri Sokolov, suspected of involvement in the kidnapping. Petrov asserts Joe’s kidnapping was not authorised by Russia, and confirms to Mullins that Yurimov’s return will help ease tensions. Renat meets with Sokolov in a D.C. bistro to arrange passage out of the country. Joe orders the team to engage, conflicting with NSA orders to detain. Renat executes Sokolov before being shot dead, but the visiting Foreign Minister of Senegal and her security get killed in the crossfire, and Tex and Randy are injured. When retrieving Yurimov from GTMO Camp Delta, Alex, the handler Kyle imprisoned, recognises Joe from the contract offer he declined and promises details about Renat's benefactors for his freedom. Yurimov tells Joe that Iran has more personal reasons to target her than Ukraine, and not to underestimate how many people hate the US. Alex provides further intel implicating Iran via their proxy KSS, but Joe discovers Balakin has already been killed. Joe finds her home empty with a for sale sign outside. It is revealed that Aaliyah masterminded the kidnapping. Now married to a wealthy man in Qatar, she orders another attempt, wanting Joe to be extracted so she can kill the whole Lioness team when they come to rescue her.

== Production ==
=== Development ===
The 2019 merger of CBS and Viacom led to the creation of the Paramount+ brand, launched in 2021; in September 2020, in the unveiling of the initial plans for the Paramount+ programming slate, Lioness was announced as one of the service's new productions with Yellowstone creator Taylor Sheridan serving as the creator of the series and would serve as executive producer via his Bosque Ranch Productions banner alongside Yellowstone co-producer & global entertainment company 101 Studios.

The series was renewed for a second season in May 2024, and a third season on October 1, 2025. In August 2025, following Paramount Global's merger with Skydance Media to form Paramount Skydance, MTV Entertainment Studios was folded into Paramount Television Studios prior to production of the third season. Sheridan penned all 24 episodes of the series' first three seasons.

=== Casting ===
In February 2022, Zoe Saldaña was cast to star in the series, and joined as an executive producer alongside Nicole Kidman. Laysla De Oliveira joined the cast the following month. In June, Sheridan took over as showrunner of the series from Thomas Brady following the conclusion of the show's writers' room. Casting continued in September, with the additions of Dave Annable, LaMonica Garrett, James Jordan, Austin Hébert, Jonah Wharton and Hannah Love Lanier. In January 2023, Kidman and Michael Kelly joined the cast alongside Morgan Freeman.

On May 9, 2024, it was reported that returning cast members for season two include Zoe Saldaña, Laysla De Oliveira, Michael Kelly, and Nicole Kidman, with Morgan Freeman being promoted to a series regular role. Upon the renewal becoming official on that same date, De Oliveira expressed her excitement about returning to her role as Cruz on her Instagram account. On May 17, 2024, it was announced that Thad Luckinbill was promoted as a series regular for the second season. Few days later, Genesis Rodriguez joined the cast in an undisclosed capacity for the second season. On September 13, 2024, Max Martini, Kirk Acevedo, and Patricia de Leon were cast in recurring roles for the second season. It was later noted that Sheridan played a role named Cody—the KT tape-wrapped Delta Force Operator who assured an iffy Joe.

In October 2025, it was announced that frequent Sheridan collaborator Ian Bohen had joined the cast as a Delta Force operator in a series regular role. On January 29, 2026, Elizaveta Neretin joined the cast in a recurring capacity for the third season.

=== Filming ===
Filming began in Delaware in September 2022 and continued in Mallorca in January 2023. In May 2023, it was announced that the series title was changed from Lioness to Special Ops: Lioness, although the title card remained unchanged. The title reverted to the original title when the series was renewed for its second season.

Andrew Lockington composed the soundtrack for the series, having previously worked with Taylor Sheridan in Mayor of Kingstown. Lakeshore Records has released the series' soundtrack.

In May 2024, production for the second season officially began, relocating from the gritty streets of Baltimore, Maryland, to the expansive landscapes of Texas. Sheridan was reported to be directing the third episode of the new season. On August 29, 2024, Kelly announced that filming of the second season had been wrapped.

The production of the third season commenced in October 2025. Location filming in Fort Worth began in October 2025. Filming wrapped on March 25, 2026.

== Inspiration ==
The series is very loosely based on the premise of Team Lioness, where in Iraq in 2003, the decision was made to send female soldiers out with patrols, aiming to stop insurgents from using women to smuggle material because male US soldiers found it difficult to search Muslim women. These teams found themselves in direct combat situations, in violation of the Combat Exclusion Policy (changed only a decade later), which hindered the soldiers from getting veteran benefits after service.

== Release ==
Paramount+ unveiled a first-look trailer for the show on June 8, 2023. The eight-part series premiered on July 23, 2023 on Paramount+ with two one-hour episodes, and subsequent episodes released weekly thereafter. The red carpet premiere for the series, initially slated for July 18, 2023 at the Directors Guild of America Theatre in Los Angeles, was canceled due to the impact of the 2023 SAG-AFTRA strike in the United States. This marked one of the first events to be canceled in response to the strike.

The second season premiere with its first two episodes on October 27, 2024.

The third season premiered on August 2, 2026.

== Reception ==
=== Critical response ===
Critical response of Lioness
Season	Rotten Tomatoes	Metacritic
1	56% (36 reviews)	56 (19 reviews)
2	90% (10 reviews)	—N/a
3	85% (13 reviews)	76 (5 reviews)

For the first season, the review aggregator website Rotten Tomatoes reported a 56% approval rating and an average rating of 6.1/10, based on 36 reviews. As of Apr 2025, the show has an overall Rotten Tomatoes rating of 73%. The website's critics consensus reads, "Zoe Saldaña provides the energy of a Lioness, but these Special Ops are largely derivative and unconvincing." On Metacritic, it has a weighted average score of 56 out of 100 based on 19 critics, indicating "mixed or average reviews".

Despite praising the performances of Laysla De Oliveira and Zoe Saldaña, Anita Singh of The Daily Telegraph criticized "the one thing that lets the show down is Nicole Kidman as a CIA boss, whose frozen face these days is a total distraction".

Tania Hussain of Collider praised the performance of the cast but criticized the show as "flawed story" and found Taylor Sheridan was struggling to write about women. Another writer from Collider, Michael John Petty, said the series "might work best as a one-and-done story," though later noted in his Season 2 review that the show that "Sheridan and company have managed to extend the narrative as organically as possible, offering hope for the future of this series." Angie Han of The Hollywood Reporter criticized the script as "seems to be constructed with the assumption that most of the audience will only be half-watching while scrolling Facebook on their phones anyway" but couldn't deny the fact that "there is one aspect of Special Ops: Lioness that shines through clear as day no matter how much or how little of your focus you've directed toward it, and that is its reverence for the U.S. Marine Corps".

Jim Hemphill of IndieWire praised the cinematography work of Paul Cameron as it "breaks all the cinematography rules" and "in Cameron's hands, even a standard dialogue scene between two actors has extra dynamism and energy that come simply from looking for unorthodox angles or alternating focal lengths in a manner that might seem counterintuitive".

Reviewer Mike Hale, writing for The New York Times, wrote that the show "turned out to be a moody, suspenseful, textured genre piece with characters you cared about," and that "Sheridan found a form, the action thriller, that suits him better than the western soap operas and contemporary crime dramas that he has produced up to now." Initially, when only screening the first episode, Hale wrote the show "looks like an awful lot of other counterterrorism thrillers, with a visceral punch to its action and a ticky-tacky, backlot feel." Also based on the first episode, Variety criticized it as "cliché" and "shameless military propaganda".

On Rotten Tomatoes, the second season has a 90% approval rating based on 10 critic reviews, with an average rating of 7.3/10.

On Rotten Tomatoes, the third season has a 85% approval rating based on 13 critic reviews, with an average rating of 7.3/10. On Metacritic, it has a weighted average score of 76 out of 100 based on 5 critics, indicating "generally favorable reviews".

=== Audience viewership ===
The first season achieved a milestone by becoming the streamer's most-watched worldwide series premiere on launch day at the time, drawing nearly 6 million total viewers in its first week across Paramount+ globally and during a linear preview on the Paramount Network. This record was later surpassed by Lawmen: Bass Reeves, another series produced by Taylor Sheridan for Paramount+. Special Ops: Lioness emerged as one of the most-watched global series premieres on Paramount+ in 2023.

The second season garnered three million views within its first seven days. It placed #4 Paramount+ originals with the biggest domestic household premieres. It was reported a total of 12.4 million viewers globally across all platforms until the week of November 10 and an increase of average households from 4.8 million to 5.4 million. The second season reached 8.3 million domestic households, a 10% increase compared to its season 1 of 7.6 million, and secured #3 in the most-watched global series premieres on Paramount+ in 2024.

According to Nielsen's latest data, measuring only U.S. views on TV sets, the second season was placed #8 and #5 position in the original series chart during the week of October 28–November 3 and November 4–10, respectively. It placed #6 and #7 for November 11–17 and November 18–24, respectively. It maintained its #6 position for the week of November 25 – December 1. During December 2–8 and December 9–15, the series continued its strong hold by placing #4 and #6 in the original series chart, especially the first time securing the #7 position overall chart for the week of December 2–8. During the week of December 16–22 and December 23–29, the series ranked at No. 10 and #9, respectively. It went up to No. 6 during the week of December 30 – January 5. According to Luminate Film & TV Streaming Viewership, the second and first season ranked as the no. 4 and no. 8 most-watched streaming original series in the U.S. for the week of November 29 – December 5.

=== Accolades ===
Award	Date of ceremony	Category	Nominee(s)	Result	Ref.
Asia Contents Awards & Global OTT Awards	October 8, 2023	Best Creative	Special Ops: Lioness	Nominated	
Asia Contents Awards & Global OTT Awards	October 8, 2023	Best Writer	Taylor Sheridan	Nominated	
Asia Contents Awards & Global OTT Awards	October 8, 2023	Best Lead Actress	Zoe Saldaña	Nominated	
Critics' Choice Super Awards	April 4, 2024	Best Action Series, Limited Series or Made-for-TV Movie	Special Ops: Lioness	Nominated	
Critics' Choice Super Awards	April 4, 2024	Best Actress in an Action Series, Limited Series or Made-for-TV Movie	Zoe Saldaña	Won	
Black Reel TV Awards	August 13, 2024	Outstanding Lead Performance in a Drama Series	Zoe Saldaña	Nominated	
Black Reel TV Awards	August 13, 2024	Outstanding Editing	Sushila Love	Nominated	
Critics' Choice Television Awards	February 7, 2025	Best Supporting Actress in a Drama Series	Nicole Kidman	Nominated	
NAACP Image Awards	February 22, 2025	Outstanding Actress in a Drama Series	Zoe Saldaña	Nominated	
Primetime Emmy Awards	September 6, 2025	Outstanding Stunt Coordination for Drama Programming	Wade Allen	Nominated	

== See also ==
- 2008 documentary Lioness, which is about one of the first members of Team Lioness in Ramadi, Iraq between 2003 and 2004.
