= We Baby Bears =

American animated television series

- Genre: Adventure; Comedy
- Based on: The Three Bare Bears; We Bare Bears by Daniel Chong
- Developed by: Manny Hernandez
- Showrunners: Manny Hernandez (season 1); Calvin Wong (season 2)
- Voices of: Connor Andrade; Amari McCoy; Max Mitchell
- Narrated by: Demetri Martin
- Opening theme: "The Bha Bha Song" by Tri.be
- Composer: Krandal Crews
- Country of origin: United States
- Original language: English
- No. of seasons: 2
- No. of episodes: 80

Production
- Executive producers: Manny Hernandez; Daniel Chong; Sam Register; Calvin Wong (season 2)
- Producers: Keith Mack; Carrie Wilksen (season 1)
- Animators: Saerom Animation; Rough Draft Studios
- Editor: Tom Browngardt
- Running time: 11 minutes
- Production company: Cartoon Network Studios

Original release
- Network: Cartoon Network
- Release: January 1, 2022 – present

Related
- We Bare Bears

We Baby Bears is an American animated television series developed by Manny Hernandez for Cartoon Network. It is a spin-off prequel to the animated series We Bare Bears, which was created by Daniel Chong. Produced by Cartoon Network Studios, it premiered on January 1, 2022. On January 31, 2022, the series was renewed for a second season, which premiered on June 17, 2023.

== Premise ==
We Baby Bears follows Grizz, Panda, and Ice Bear as cubs searching for a new home in a magical teleporting box.

== Voice cast ==
- Connor Andrade as Baby Grizz
- Amari McCoy as Baby Panda / Box
- Max Mitchell as Baby Ice Bear
- Demetri Martin as the Narrator (Martin previously voiced Adult Ice Bear in the original show)
- Willow Smith as Unica
- Tunde Adebimpe as Unica's Dad
- Dulcé Sloan as Unica's Mom
- Gunnar Sizemore as Squatter Otter / Jeffiroth
- Janeane Garofalo as Madame Malin / Old Lady Rootmouth
- Kaya McLean as Madeline
- Paris Newton as Dippy
- Dominique Jackson as Cassi
- Olivia Olson as Ursa / Pegasus / Employee / Goblin
- Em Hagen as Polly / Seaweeds
- Cameron Esposito as Winnie
- Toby Fox as Jared
- Haley Joel Osment as Teddi Bear
- Rhys Darby as Craig
- Toks Olagundoye as Lady Lima / Yam / Radish
- Damian O'Hare as Carrot / Castle Guard / Pea
- Kevin Michael Richardson as Eggplant / Tomato / Old Lettuce / Craig Jester
- Eric Bauza as Sam Spider Spade / Chief of Police / Wasp / Robot Panda / Cashier / Broccoli / Celery Blacksmith / Veggie Artist
- Young M.A as Pip
- Anderson .Paak as TK
- Soul Anderson as Teejay / Tad
- Bernardo Velasco as Luis
- Alejandro Saab as Coatimundi Pinata / Male Goat Pinata / Alligator
- Michelle Ortiz as Donkey Pinata / Female Goat Pinata / Alligator
- Fryda Wolff as Chicken Pinata / Horse Pinata / Alligator
- Alok Vaid-Menon as Kiara
- Sunita Mani as Laila
- Sendhil Ramamurthy as Ben / Swiss Chard
- Anjali Bhimani as Amy / Diya / Hillbilly Birds
- Steve Blum as Giant Igloo / Snowman / Sun
- Wayne Wilderson as Diving Board / Snowman / Boombox
- Kari Wahlgren as Twinky
- Tru Valentino as Blinky / Finky / Jay / Snowman / Snowman Bouncer / Temi's Dad
- Deedee Magno Hall as Fairy / Snowball
- Rachel Butera as Mama Fossil / Ugg / Bugg
- Jim Meskimen as Papa Fossil / Pterry / Grock
- Alyssa Limperis as Flower / Gramby Thorny / Booky
- Sara Cravens as Bird / Lizard / Happy Kid with Telescope / Rock
- Manila Luzon as Gouda
- Jiavani Linayao as Farah / Virginia
- Vico Ortiz as Lorraine / Lorraine's Shark
- Jenelle Lynn Randall as Aunty Nadia
- Hero Hunter as Junior
- Celestina Harris as Lovely
- Flula Borg as Kyle / Armadillo
- Kimiko Glenn as Liv / Sardine / Armadillo
- Amy Sedaris as Geraldine
- Scott Aukerman as Mollusk
- Courtenay Taylor as Swordfish
- Amy Landecker as Gail
- Bradley Whitford as Glen
- Fred Tatasciore as Orville Tusk / Porcupine Chef / Cat Guitar / Vine
- Julia Pott as Susie McCallister
- Lo Mutuc (Note: Credited as Charlyne Yi) as Alice Fefferman
- Nikki Castillo as Betsy Spellman
- Bill Farmer as Lord Billy Willy / Phone
- Maya Tuttle as Temi
- Sue Shaheen as Manager / Jackal
- Marwan Salama as Mummy / Hippo / Dog Bather
- Sandra Saad as Ibis / Cat
- Will Choi as Big Tom
- Michael Luwoye as Statue / Puzzle
- Alan Oppenheimer as Booey
- Cristina Vee as Axel
- Tom Kenny as Landlord / Squid / Davy Jones / Caricature Artist / Armadillo
- Lori Alan as Goose
- Sirena Irwin as Mayor Centipede / Silk Worms / Mom / Baba Yaga House / Elf Girl / Lock / Old Lady Bug / Poochy
- Debra Wilson as Miss Teal / Mrs. Gray / Mole Queen / Dope Butterfly / Mole Soldier / Brassy Maine Coon / Happy Flower / Pond / Spider Lady
- Gary Anthony Williams as Butler / Colonel Pink / Mr. Meow Meow / Doctor / Happy Baker / Log
- Tina Huang as Panda's Mom / Can of Veggies
- Rebecca Husain as Bleep Blorp / Eunice
- Sean Giambrone as Francis
- Oscar Eisenbise as Gilbert
- Sunhee Seo as Sheep Heads
- Jason Mantzoukas as Zorpo
- Stephen Oyoung as Wally
- Keston John as Buff Teddy
- Dino Andrade as Sclubworm / Fish
- Sam Marin as Captain Chonk
- SungWon Cho as Berkeley / Anime Guy / Anime Girl
- Mark David as Crow / Monster House / Arrow
- Candi Milo as Scarecrow / Bazooka / Bubble / Feral Bubble / Gorilla
- Harvey Guillén as Genie / Wishbone Salesman
- Salli Saffioti as Gloria / Rat / Manager / Tattoo Artist
- Michael Benjamin Washington as Caterpillar
- Amir Talai as Brad / Chad
- Severine Howell-Meri as Bell Pepper Soldier
- Whitmer Thomas as Eels
- Luke Youngblood as Bernard / Potion / Bouncer Brad / Hedgehog / Steven / Shark / Turtle
- Eloise Wong as Badger
- Bela Salazar as Skunk
- Lucia de la Garza as Possum
- Mila de la Garza as Bat
- Artt Butler as Anime Guy
- Michael Rivkin as Troll / Dragon / Receptionist / Skeleton
- Manny Hernandez as Crab / Clam / Some Rando

== Production ==
The series was first announced on May 30, 2019, and was slated to premiere on Cartoon Network in spring 2021, but was delayed to January 2022. A trailer was released on November 25, 2021, and the series premiered its first 10 episodes in a marathon on New Year's Day 2022. The series is rendered in an anime-esque style and features the bears going on various adventures in their magical box. Manny Hernandez, who served as supervising director on the original series, serves as the showrunner while Daniel Chong is involved as an executive producer.

The series had a crossover Halloween special with Summer Camp Island, which premiered on October 8, 2022.

== Episodes ==
=== Series overview ===
Season	Episodes	Originally released	
Season	Episodes	First released	Last released
1	40	January 1, 2022	May 13, 2023
2	40	June 17, 2023	December 5, 2026

=== Season 1 (2022–23) ===
No. overall	No. in season	Title	Directed by	Written by	Storyboarded by	Original release date	Prod. code	U.S. viewers (millions)
1	1	"Magical Box" "The Magical Box"	Manny Hernandez	Manny Hernandez	Manny Hernandez & Chana Kim	January 1, 2022	002	0.28
The baby bears are still looking for a home but a shooting star hits their box which makes their box a inter-dimensional traveling box, so it's a dimension traveling adventure for a new home.
2	2	"Bears and the Beanstalk"	George Kaprielian	Mikey Heller	Sooyeon Lee & Geno Rodriguez	January 1, 2022	003	0.24
The baby bears arrive in a new home of a giant cook. But it has the intention of using of goose for its eggs that the giant locked up. The bears are going to save the goose.
3	3	"BooDunnit"	George Kaprielian	Shawn Pearlman	Andrew Stewart & Chana Kim	January 1, 2022	008	0.22
4	4	"The Little Mer-Bear"	George Kaprielian	Mikey Heller	Kris Stanton & Sarah Sobole	January 1, 2022	006	0.22
5	5	"Modernish Stone Age Family"	George Kaprielian	Kris Mukai	Sarah Sobole & Kris Stanton	January 1, 2022	010	0.23
6	6	"Excalibear"	Christina Chang	Mikey Heller	Christina Chang & Yvonne Hsuan Ho	January 1, 2022	004	0.26
7	7	"Meathouse" "Meat House"	Christina Chang	Mikey Heller	Geno Rodriguez & Yvonne Hsuan Ho	January 1, 2022	007	0.27
8	8	"Pirate Parrot Polly"	Christina Chang & George Kaprielian	Kris Mukai	Sooyeon Lee & Nora Meek	January 1, 2022	005	0.28
9	9	"Baby Bear Genius"	Christina Chang	Mikey Heller	Yvonne Hsuan Ho & Chana Kim	January 1, 2022	011	0.27
10	10	"Bug City Sleuths"	George Kaprielian	Dick Grunert	Sarah Sobole & Kris Stanton	January 1, 2022	014	0.27
11	11	"Hashtag #1 Fan" "Hashtag Number One Fan"	Christina Chang	Kris Mukai	Gladyfaith Abcede & Sooyeon Lee	January 3, 2022	009	0.17
12	12	"Snowplace Like Home" "Snow Place Like Home"	George Kaprielian	Kris Mukai	Kris Stanton & Sarah Sobole	January 3, 2022	001	0.16
13	13	"Fiesta Day"	George Kaprielian	Mikey Heller	André Lamilza & Geno Rodriguez	January 10, 2022	012	0.18
14	14	"Baba Yaga House"	Christina Chang	Mikey Heller	Yvonne Hsuan Ho & Chana Kim	January 10, 2022	019	0.15
15	15	"Bears in the Dark"	George Kaprielian	Shakira Pressley	Sarah Sobole & Kristin Stanton	January 17, 2022	018	0.13
16	16	"Big Trouble Little Babies"	George Kaprielian	Shawn Kenji Pearlman	André Lamilza & Geno Rodriguez	January 17, 2022	015	0.13
17	17	"Triple T Tigers"	Christina Chang	Charley Feldman	Yvonne Hsuan Ho, Kris Stanton & Chana Kim	January 24, 2022	016	0.16
18	18	"Panda's Family"	Christina Chang	Kris Mukai	Christina Chang, Melissa Sheng & Sooyeon Lee	January 24, 2022	017	0.15
19	19	"A Tale of Two Ice Bears"	George Kaprielian	Mikey Heller & Kris Mukai	André Lamilza & Geno Rodriguez	January 31, 2022	020	0.17
20	20	"Unica"	Christina Chang	Mikey Heller & Kris Mukai	Sooyeon Lee, Melissa Sheng & Gladyfaith Abcede	January 31, 2022	013	0.20
21	21	"Sheep Bears"	George Kaprielian	Charley Feldman	Sarah Sobole & Kris Stanton	May 2, 2022	021	0.10
22	22	"Ice Bear's Pet"	George Kaprielian	Mikey Heller	Melissa Sheng & Sooyeon Lee	May 3, 2022	022	0.15
23	23	"Dragon Pests"	George Kaprielian & Caroline Director	Shawn Kenji Pearlman	André LaMilza & Geno Rodriguez	May 4, 2022	023	0.12
24	24	"No Land, All Air!"	George Kaprielian	Kris Mukai	Chana Kim & Yvonne Hsuan Ho	May 5, 2022	024	0.15
25	25	"Tooth Fairy Tech"	George Kaprielian	Lindsay Kerns	Kris Stanton & Sarah Sobole	May 6, 2022	025	0.15
26	26	"High Baby Fashion"	George Kaprielian	Jen Bardekoff	Melissa Sheng & Sooyeon Lee	July 18, 2022	026	0.08
27	27	"Teddi Bear"	George Kaprielian	Kris Mukai	André LaMilza & Geno Rodriguez	July 19, 2022	027	0.10
28	28	"A Gross Worm" "Gross Worm"	George Kaprielian & Caroline Director	Mikey Heller	Chana Kim & Yvonne Hsuan Ho	July 20, 2022	028	0.09
29	29	"A Real Crayon"	George Kaprielian	Kris Mukai	Sarah Sobole & Kris Stanton	July 21, 2022	029	0.15
30	30	"Witches"	George Kaprielian	Mikey Heller	Melissa Sheng & Sooyeon Lee	October 8, 2022	030	0.15
31	31	"Happy Bouncy Fun Town"	George Kaprielian	Lorraine Degraffenreidt	André Lamilza & Geno Rodriguez	October 8, 2022	031	0.13
32	32	"Back to Our Regular Time Period"	Caroline Director	Karen Joseph Adcock	Chana Kim & Yvonne Hsuan Ho	October 15, 2022	032	0.12
33	33	"Bath on the Nile"	George Kaprielian	Kris Mukai	Sarah Sobole & Kris Stanton	October 22, 2022	033	0.23
34	34	"Bubble Fields"	Caroline Director	Mikey Heller	Melissa Sheng & Sooyeon Lee	October 29, 2022	036	0.12
35	35	"Who Crashed the RV?"	George Kaprielian	Mikey Heller & Kris Mukai	André Lamilza & Geno Rodriguez	January 7, 2023	038	0.07
36	36	"Temple Bears"	George Kaprielian	Mikey Heller	André Lamilza & Geno Rodriguez	January 14, 2023	034	0.16
37	37	"Lighthouse"	Caroline Director	Lorraine Degraffenreidt	Sarah Sobole & Caroline Director	January 21, 2023	035	0.09
38	38	"Doll's House"	Caroline Director	Kris Mukai	Chana Kim & Yvonne Hsuan Ho	January 28, 2023	037	0.12
39	39	"Little Fallen Star" "The Little Fallen Star"	Manny Hernandez, Caroline Director & George Kaprielian	Mikey Heller & Kris Mukai	Melissa Sheng, Sooyeon Lee & Kris Stanton	May 13, 2023	039	0.09
40	40	"Little Fallen Star" "The Little Fallen Star"	Manny Hernandez, Caroline Director & George Kaprielian	Mikey Heller & Kris Mukai	Melissa Sheng, Sooyeon Lee & Kris Stanton	May 13, 2023	040	0.09

=== Season 2 (2023–26) ===
No. overall	No. in season	Title	Directed by	Written by	Storyboarded by	Original release date	Prod. code
New and Old Friends
41	1	"The Big Wish"	Caroline Director & George Kaprielian	Mikey Heller & Kris Mukai	Geno Rodriguez, Joy Yang, Kris Stanton & Julian Sanchez	June 17, 2023	041
42	2	"The Big Wish"	Caroline Director & George Kaprielian	Mikey Heller & Kris Mukai	Geno Rodriguez, Joy Yang, Kris Stanton & Julian Sanchez	June 17, 2023	042
43	3	"Polly's New Crew"	George Kaprielian	Madeline "Moop" Khare	Melissa Sheng, Erin Kim, Christina Chang & Caroline Director	June 17, 2023	043
44	4	"Bug City Frame Up"	Caroline Director & George Kaprielian	Mikey Heller & Kris Mukai	Sarah Sobole, Sooyeon Lee, Geno Rodriguez & Joy Yang	June 24, 2023	044
45	5	"Bug City Frame Up"	Caroline Director & George Kaprielian	Mikey Heller & Kris Mukai	Sarah Sobole, Sooyeon Lee, Geno Rodriguez & Joy Yang	June 24, 2023	045
46	6	"The Great Veggie War"	Caroline Director & George Kaprielian	Mikey Heller & Kris Mukai	Kris Stanton, Julian Sanchez, Melissa Sheng & Erin Kim	July 1, 2023	046
47	7	"The Great Veggie War"	Caroline Director & George Kaprielian	Mikey Heller & Kris Mukai	Kris Stanton, Julian Sanchez, Melissa Sheng & Erin Kim	July 1, 2023	047
Glitterwood Rocks
48	8	"Unica's House"	Caroline Director	Kris Mukai	Sarah Sobole & Sooyeon Lee	August 26, 2023	048
49	9	"Rexford's Nectar"	George Kaprielian	Mikey Heller	Geno Rodriguez & Joy Yang	August 26, 2023	049
50	10	"Grizz's Doc"	Caroline Director	Kris Mukai	Kris Stanton & Julian Sanchez	August 26, 2023	050
51	11	"Triple T Tiger Lilies"	George Kaprielian	Madeline "Moop" Khare	Melissa Sheng & Erin Kim	August 26, 2023	051
52	12	"After Bedtime"	Caroline Director	Madeline "Moop" Khare	Sarah Sobole & Sooyeon Lee	August 26, 2023	052
53	13	"The Parade"	Caroline Director	Kris Mukai	Geno Rodriguez & Joy Yang	August 26, 2023	053
54	14	"The Big Bloom"	George Kaprielian & Caroline Director	Mikey Heller	Kris Stanton, Julian Sanchez, Melissa Sheng & Erin Kim	August 26, 2023	054
55	15	"The Big Bloom"	George Kaprielian & Caroline Director	Mikey Heller	Kris Stanton, Julian Sanchez, Melissa Sheng & Erin Kim	August 26, 2023	055
Atlantis Bound
56	16	"Return to the Sea"	Caroline Director	Mikey Heller	Sarah Sobole & Sooyeon Lee	February 1, 2025	056
57	17	"Shark!"	George Kaprielian	Mikey Heller	Geno Rodriguez & Joy Yang	February 1, 2025	057
58	18	"Sunken Sub"	Caroline Director	Kris Mukai	Kris Stanton & Julian Sanchez	February 8, 2025	058
59	19	"Flounder Fam"	George Kaprielian	Kris Mukai	Melissa Sheng & Erin Kim	February 8, 2025	059
60	20	"Land World"	George Kaprielian	Madeline "Moop" Khare	Geno Rodriguez & Joy Yang	February 15, 2025	060
61	21	"Bermuda Baby Bears"	Caroline Director	Mikey Heller	Sarah Sobole & Sooyeon Lee	February 15, 2025	061
62	22	"Welcome to Atlantis"	Caroline Director & George Kaprielian	Madeline "Moop" Khare & Kris Mukai	Kris Stanton, Julian Sanchez, Melissa Sheng & Erin Kim	February 22, 2025	062
63	23	"Welcome to Atlantis"	Caroline Director & George Kaprielian	Madeline "Moop" Khare & Kris Mukai	Kris Stanton, Julian Sanchez, Melissa Sheng & Erin Kim	February 22, 2025	063
Cosmic Big Bros
64	24	"Three Bears and a Dippy"	Caroline Director	Kris Mukai	Sarah Sobole & Chana Kim	September 6, 2025	069
65	25	"Space Beach"	George Kaprielian	Mikey Heller	Geno Rodriguez & Joy Yang	September 13, 2025	070
66	26	"Black Hole"	George Kaprielian	Madeline "Moop" Khare	Melissa Sheng & Erin Kim	September 20, 2025	071
67	27	"Uncle Orion"	Caroline Director	Kris Mukai	Kris Stanton, Siti Lu & Julian Sanchez	September 27, 2025	072
68	28	"The Wish Cannon"	Caroline Director	Madeline "Moop" Khare	Sarah Sobole & Chana Kim	October 4, 2025	073
69	29	"Intergalactic Party Crashers"	George Kaprielian	Mikey Heller	Geno Rodriguez & Joy Yang	October 11, 2025	074
Yokai Art School
70	30	"First Day of Art School"	Caroline Director	Mikey Heller	Julian Sanchez & Kris Stanton	May 30, 2026	064
71	31	"Intermediate Photography"	George Kaprielian	Madeline "Moop" Khare	Melissa Sheng & Erin Kim	June 6, 2026	065
72	32	"Independent Study: Mass Appeal"	George Kaprielian	Kris Mukai	Geno Rodriguez & Joy Yang	June 13, 2026	066
73	33	"Advanced Ceramics"	Caroline Director	Madeline "Moop" Khare	Sarah Sobole & Chana Kim	June 20, 2026	067
74	34	"Graduation Day"	Caroline Director	Kris Mukai	Kris Stanton & Julian Sanchez	June 27, 2026	068
Worlds Apart
75	35	"Blarfenpleepo"	George Kaprielian	Mikey Heller	Melissa Sheng & Erin Kim	December 5, 2026	075
76	36	"Grizz Island"	Caroline Director	Mikey Heller	Sarah Sobole & Chana Kim	December 5, 2026	076
77	37	"Panda Goes West"	George Kaprielian	Madeline "Moop" Khare	Geno Rodriguez & Joy Yang	December 5, 2026	077
78	38	"Ice Bear vs. Cyber City"	Caroline Director	Kris Mukai	Kris Stanton & Siti Lu	December 5, 2026	078
79	39	"The Box and the Fox"	George Kaprielian & Caroline Director	Mikey Heller, Kris Mukai & Madeline "Moop" Khare	Chana Kim, Sarah Sobole, Julian Sanchez, Erin Kim, Melissa Sheng & Siti Lu	December 5, 2026	079
80	40	"The Box and the Fox"	George Kaprielian & Caroline Director	Mikey Heller, Kris Mukai & Madeline "Moop" Khare	Chana Kim, Sarah Sobole, Julian Sanchez, Erin Kim, Melissa Sheng & Siti Lu	December 5, 2026	080

== Broadcast ==
=== U.S. ===
We Baby Bears debuted on Cartoon Network on January 1, 2022. Boomerang aired the series for only one day on February 11, 2024.

On March 22, 2025, reruns of the show started airing on Discovery Family Channel.

=== Internationally ===
In the UK, We Baby Bears first aired on Cartoon Network UK on April 4, 2022.

== Home media ==
We Baby Bears had its first DVD release on October 25, 2022, consisting of the first 20 episodes from the first season.
