= Singappenney =

Singappenney (transl. Lioness) may refer to:

- "Singappenney" (song), a song from the 2019 Indian film Bigil
- Singappenney (film), a 2024 Indian Tamil-language sports drama film

== See also ==
- Lioness (disambiguation)
