= Female Engagement Team =

Military groups for gender-based tasks

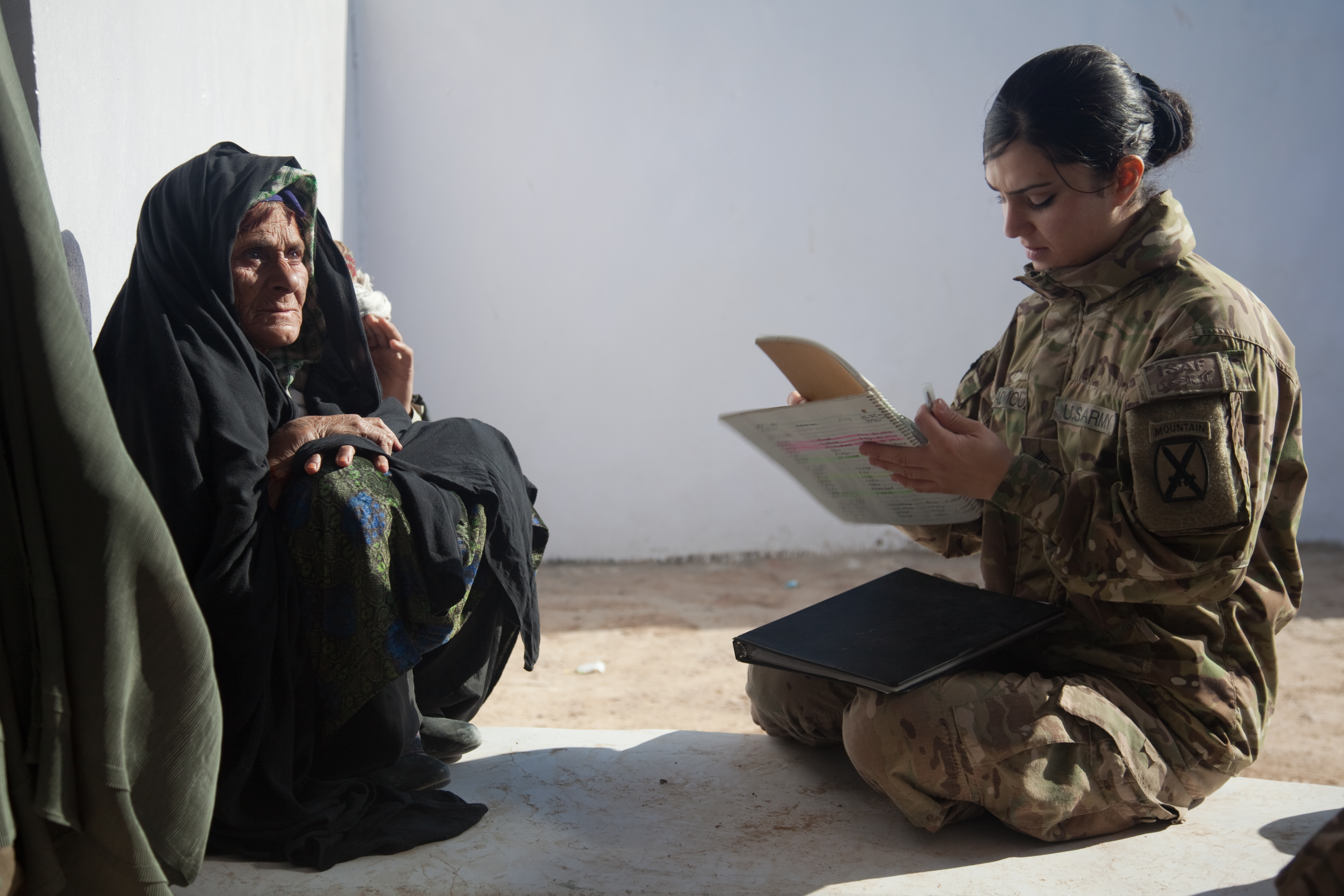
A U.S. Army sergeant, part of a Female Engagement Team in Afghanistan, gathering information from women so that blankets and winter clothing can be distributed to the women and their families

Female Engagement Teams (FETs) are groups of female military personnel around the world which undertake specialized gender-suited tasks. FETs' tasks are as varied as American FETs interacting with local Afghan women in Afghanistan; Ghana Battalion FETs taking part in gathering intelligence during peacekeeping operations in the Democratic Republic of Congo; New Zealand Defence Force FETs supporting Special Operations Force objectives, the primary role being to "engage with local women and adolescents [...] in situations where it would be culturally unacceptable to involve male SOF operators", and the Jordanian Armed Forces FETs helping to conduct physical searches of women along the borders. However FETs also have had their fair share of limited success and problems in certain operations, with service personnel unable to interact successfully with the required population, lack of translators, too short a time frame or commanders refusing to take up FET missions.

== History ==
Female Engagement Teams have their roots in American military operations in Iraq and Afghanistan, in the form of Team Lioness between 2003 and 2004. In 2009, the US Marine Corps attached FETs to infantry units. One of the first FET programs was with 3rd Battalion, 8th Marine Regiment, Farah Province, Afghanistan. The first permanent American FET arrived in Afghanistan (Regional Command Southwest) in March 2010 whereas the first British FET began in October 2010. Australia, United Kingdom and Canada also employed FETs in Afghanistan. Sweden used all-female as well as mixed-gender engagement teams.

Nominated Secretary of Defense, Pete Hegseth voiced his support for female engagement teams at his Senate confirmation hearing on January 14, 2025.
