= Hannah Love Lanier =

American actress

- Born: Los Angeles, California, U.S.
- Occupation: Actress
- Years active: 2019–present

Hannah Love Lanier is an American actress. She is best known for playing Kate in the Paramount+ spy thriller series Lioness.

== Early life ==
Lanier was born in Los Angeles, California. Her grandfather is Joseph C. Terry, Emmy Award winning director of The Oprah Winfrey Show.

== Career ==
Lanier's first recurring role came in the animated series The Tiny Mighty Club. She made a one off appearance in the comedy series A Black Lady Sketch Show. Her biggest role so far has been playing Kate in the Paramount+ series Lioness. She starred in the action film Road House alongside Jake Gyllenhaal.

== Personal life ==
Lanier competed at the 2016 Junior Olympics in the long jump category. She is a lover of all animals. She cites mathematician Katherine Johnson as a big influence.

== Filmography ==
=== Film ===
Year	Title	Role	Notes
2022	The Audition Frenzy	Jennifer	Short
2024	Road House	Charlie	

=== Television ===
Year	Title	Role	Notes
2019	The Tiny Mighty Club	Hannah	15 episodes
2022	A Black Lady Sketch Show	Young Haddassah	Episode; Save my Edge, I'm a Donor!
2023–present	Lioness	Kate	16 episodes
