= Doozie's Doghouse =

American children's show

- Genre: Preschool
- Created by: Traci Paige Johnson; Jennifer Twomey
- Presented by: Celestina Harris
- Voices of: Sebastian Billingsley-Rodriguez; Aliyah Butler; Kimiko Glenn; Darius Marquis Johnson; Blake Kennedy; Donovan Patton; Alan Trinca; Kari Wahlgren; Arthur Waite
- Music by: PT Walkley
- Opening theme: "Hey Doozie!" by PT Walkley
- Country of origin: United States
- Original language: English
- No. of seasons: 1
- No. of episodes: 7

Production
- Executive producers: Traci Paige Johnson; Jennifer Twomey
- Running time: 22 minutes
- Production company: DreamWorks Animation Television

Original release
- Network: Netflix
- Release: November 9, 2026 – present

Related
- Gabby's Dollhouse

Doozie's Doghouse is an American children's television series created by Traci Paige Johnson and Jennifer Twomey that premiered on Netflix on November 9, 2026. It is a spinoff of Gabby's Dollhouse and stars Celestina Harris as Gabby's sister Doozie.

== Plot ==
Like the parent series, Doozie shrinks into her doghouse with Puggie Paws to engage in different activities. The doghouse is also connected with Gabby's Dollhouse to enable playdates between the different characters of both houses.

== Characters ==
=== Main characters ===
- Doozie (portrayed in live-action and voiced by Celestina Harris) is a girl who is into dogs and Gabby's younger sister who debuts in the fourteenth season. She is first mentioned by Gabby near the end of Gabby's Dollhouse: The Movie as she has built a dog-shaped dollhouse for her to play with.
- Puggie Paws (voiced by Sebastian Billingsley-Rodriguez) is a puggle/pig (He has a pig nose and a curly tail) who is Doozie's sidekick. Like Pandy Paws, he starts off as a stuffed toy and comes to life when Doozie and Puggie shrink into the dollhouse, He has a signature "snortle" (which is part snort and part giggle).
- CreamPup (voiced by Aaliyah Butler) is a dog/ice cream cone Doozie Dog and a counterpart of Cakey who lives in the Yummy Zone. Much like Cakey, she enjoys cooking and baking.
- Seaquin (voiced by Kimiko Glenn) is a dog/seahorse Doozie Dog and a counterpart of MerCat who lives in the Splash Zone. Like MerCat, Seaquin can swim in the air.
  - Seaquettes are the mini lookalikes of Seaquin who often accompany her.
    - Blue Seaquette (voiced by Camille de la Cruze)
    - Purple Seaquette (voiced by Amari McCoy)
    - Yellow Seaquette (voiced by Kensington Tallman)
- DreamPup (voiced by Kari Wahlgren) is a unicorn/dog Doozie Dog who wears rainbow glasses and a counterpart of Pillow Cat.
- PixiePup (voiced by Blake Kennedy) is a dog/pixie Doozie Dog and a counterpart of Kitty Fairy who lives in the magical Puppy Patch Garden. She likes granting wishes for the Doozie Dogs.
- BoxPup (voiced by Arthur Waite) is a Doozie Dog made of cardboard and a counterpart of Baby Box. He enjoys crafting and making things out of ordinary objects like Baby Box does. BoxPup also enjoys skateboarding.
- GamePup (voiced by Alan Trinca) is a dog/game controller Doozie Dog and a counterpart of Carlita who lives in the Game Zone. He can fly around and has a special bone-shaped controller belt which he uses that allows him to enter various environments in his game. GamePup likes to play the games on his controller.
- Crouton Breadington (voiced by Donovan Patton) is a dog/bread Doozie Dog and a counterpart of CatRat. He is claimed to be very helpful and tends to pop up around the Doghouse. Crouton serves as the resident fix-it guy, but sometimes causes mishaps.
- Swaggy Waggy (voiced by Darius Marquis Johnson) is a large Doozie Dog and a counterpart of DJ Catnip.

=== Supporting ===
- Larry (portrayed by a dog named Rugby) is Doozie's live-action bearded collie. Like Gabby's cat, Floyd, Larry only appears in the live-action segments.
- The Dog-A-Vator (vocal effects provided by Donovan Patton) is the dog-shaped elevator in the Doghouse that can take Doozie and Puggy anywhere in the rooms.
- DinoPup (vocal effects provided by TBA)
- Rexy Girl (vocal effects provided by TBA)

=== Returning characters ===
- Gabby (portrayed in live-action and voiced by Laila Lockhart Kraner) is Doozie's older sister who's into cats.
- Pandy Paws (voiced by Logan Bailey) is Puggie's kitty counterpart.
- Cakey (voiced by Juliet Donenfeld) is CreamPup's kitty counterpart. He appears in "Puppy Cat Playdate".
- Baby Box (voiced by Maggie Lowe) is BoxPup's kitty counterpart. She appears in "Puppy Cat Playdate".
- MerCat (voiced by Secunda Wood) is Seaquin's kitty counterpart. She appears in "Puppy Cat Playdate".
- Kitty Fairy (voiced by Tara Strong) is PixiePup's kitty counterpart. She appears in "Pixie's Wishing Day".

== Episodes ==
No.	Title	Directed by	Written by	Original release date
1	"You Be You"	Nuranee Shaw	Written by : Caitlin Hodson; Storyboarded by : Anna Brown, Dennis Crawford, Jason Horychun and Alicia Kok	November 9, 2026
Doozie tours the doghouse and the many places to play, then meets puppy friends and designs cool T-shirts for their stylish pal Seaquin's fashion show. Doozie Dog of the Day: Seaquin sings "You're the Only You".
2	"Puggie Loses His Snortle"	Chiara Ferrari	Written by : Caitlin Hodson; Storyboarded by : Anna Brown, Steve Garcia, Desirae Salmark and Cory Toomey	November 9, 2026
Part snort, part giggle, entirely adorable! Puggie has lost his silly snortle, but Doozie's on the case while playing puppy doctor in the doghouse. Doozie Dog of the Day: Puggie sings "Livin' that Doggy Dream".
3	"Puppy Cat Playdate"	Chiara Ferrari	Written by : Clark Stubbs; Storyboarded by : Steve Garcia, Desirae Salmark and Cory Toomey	November 9, 2026
Bow-wow meets meow, meow! Doozie's older sister Gabby and her Gabby Cats stop by the doghouse for a day of puppy-cat playdates to the farm, under the sea and more. Doozie Dog of the Day: CreamPup and Cakey sing the remixed version of "Sprinkle Party".
4	"Meet the Hamster Pups"	Mandy Clotworthy and Mary Hutson	Written by : Jennifer Twomey; Storyboarded by : Anna Brown, Marc Camelbeke, Grace Chen, Andrew Collins and Andrea Supandi	November 9, 2026
Yummy Zone, Puppy Patch, Game Zone? Doozie and her crew need to find the perfect place in the doghouse for a basketful of cute hamster puppies. Doozie Dog of the Day: Swaggy Waggy sings "All the Feels".
5	"Glow Cruise"	Mandy Clotworthy and Mary Hutson	Written by : Jessica Welsh; Storyboarded by : Marc Camelbeke, Grace Chen, Andrew Collins and Andrea Supandi	November 9, 2026
Get your glow on! Join Doozie, Puggie and Seaquin for a special ride on PixiePup's glittering glow cruise in the doghouse's Puppy Patch. Doozie Dog of the Day: PixiePup sings "Make a Wish on a Pixie".
6	"Mission ImPAWsible"	Nuranee Shaw	Written by : Clark Stubbs; Storyboarded by : Dennis Crawford, Jason Horychun and Alicia Kok	November 9, 2026
With cool glasses and an awesome gadget, Doozie and Puggie drop into the doghouse as puppy agents to solve problems and save CreamPup, GamePup and pals. Doozie Dog of the Day: GamePup sings "Ready, Set, Play".
7	"Pixie's Wishing Day"	Chiara Ferrari	Written by : Jessica Welsh; Storyboarded by : Steve Garcia, Desirae Salmark and Cory Toomey	November 9, 2026
It's the most magical day of the year! Pixie grants wishes to the pups in the doghouse and gets help from Doozie, her Doozie Dog pals and Kitty Fairy when she runs out of magic. Doozie Dog of the Day: Doozie and the Doozie Dogs sing "Hanging with My Dogs".

== Production ==
The character was first teased at the end of Gabby’s Dollhouse: The Movie (2025), following the release of the film, Doozie was introduced in the fourteenth season of the parent series, Netflix announced a spin-off series centered on the character, Doozie's Doghouse on September 24, 2026. The series premiered on November 9, 2026.
