= Zoe Saldaña =

American actress (born 1978)

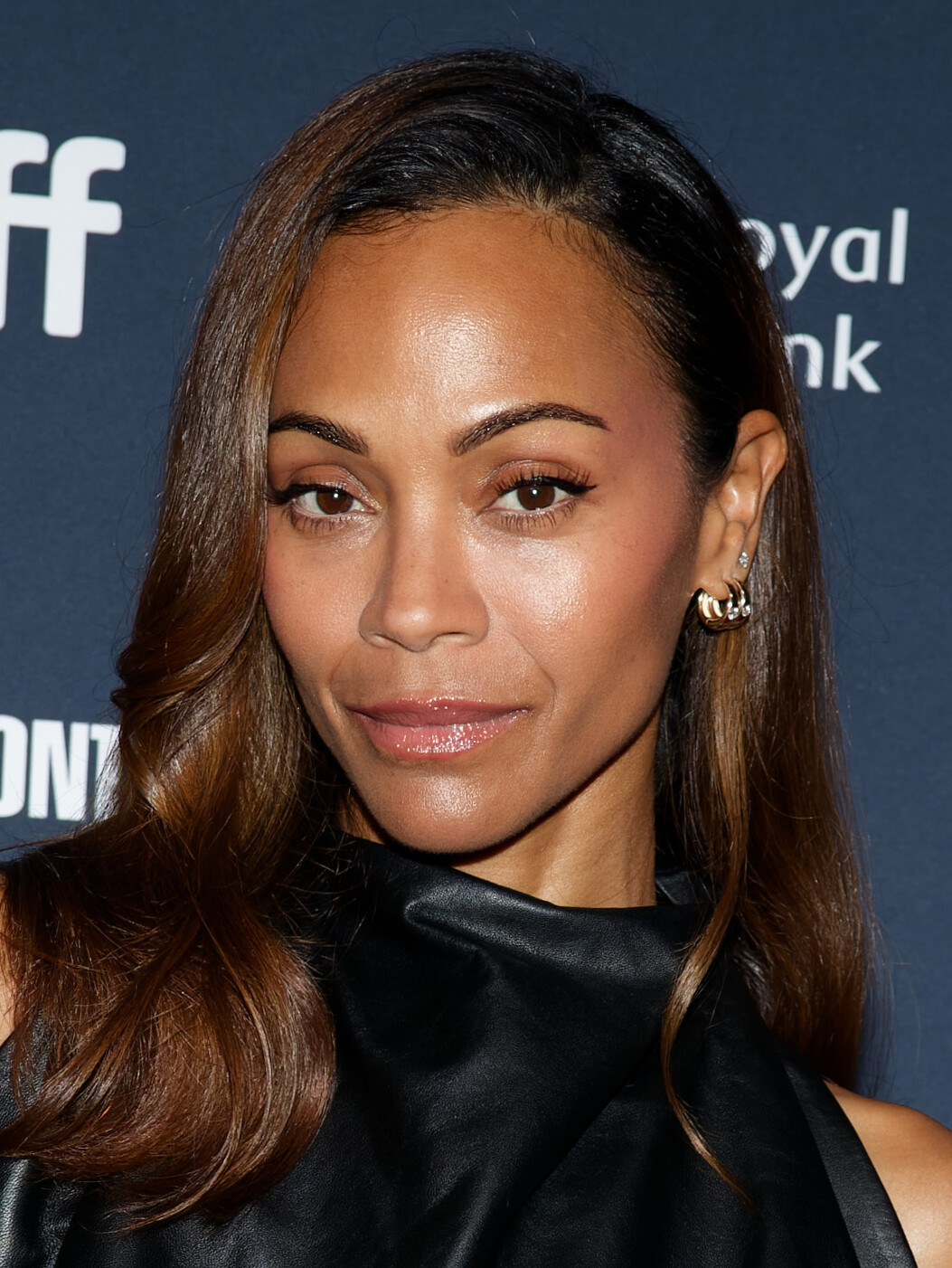
- Saldaña at the 2024 Toronto International Film Festival
- Born: Zoë Yadira Saldaña Nazario; June 19, 1978 (age 48); Passaic, New Jersey, U.S.
- Occupation: Actress
- Years active: 1999–present
- Spouse: Marco Perego-Saldaña (m. 2013)
- Children: 3
- Awards: Full list

Zoë Yadira Saldaña-Perego (Note: Pronunciation: /sɑːlˈdænjə/ sahl-DAN-yə, Latin American Spanish: [ˈso.e salˈdaɲa]) (Note: Saldaña was credited as Zoe Saldana (without the Spanish tilde accent) until 2021. Her first name is credited without the umlaut.) (née Saldaña Nazario; born June 19, 1978) is an American actress. The second highest grossing lead actor in history, she is the recipient of many accolades, including an Academy Award, a BAFTA Award, two Critics Choice Awards, a Golden Globe Award, a SAG Award, and a Cannes Film Festival Award. Time magazine named her one of the 100 most influential people in the world in 2023 and 2026.

A trained dancer, Saldaña began her acting career in 1999 with a guest role in Law & Order. Her first film role was in Center Stage (2000) in which she played a ballet dancer. She received early recognition for her work opposite Britney Spears in the road movie Crossroads (2002) and for her role in Pirates of the Caribbean: The Curse of the Black Pearl (2003). Saldaña's breakthrough came as Nyota Uhura in the Star Trek reboot film series (2009–2016) and Neytiri in James Cameron's Avatar film series (2009–present). She gained further recognition for portraying Gamora in five films of the Marvel Cinematic Universe, beginning with Guardians of the Galaxy (2014).

In addition to franchise work, Saldaña has also starred in films such as the comedy Death at a Funeral (2010), the action thriller Colombiana (2011), the crime drama Out of the Furnace (2013), the animated comedy Missing Link (2019), and the science fiction film The Adam Project (2022). For her portrayal of a lawyer in the French musical crime film Emilia Pérez, she received the Academy Award for Best Supporting Actress. On television, she starred in the Netflix romantic drama miniseries From Scratch (2022) and the Paramount+ spy series Lioness (2023–present). As a singer, she has performed original songs for the Avatar film series.

== Early life ==
Zoë Yadira Saldaña Nazario was born on June 19, 1978, in Passaic, New Jersey, and raised in the New York City borough of Queens. Her parents are Aridio Saldaña, who was Dominican, and Asalia Nazario, who is half Dominican and half Puerto Rican. In an interview with Wired, Saldaña has said that she is three-quarters Dominican and one-quarter Puerto Rican. She and her two sisters, Cisely and Mariel, were raised to be bilingual in English and Spanish; the latter was their first language at home. When she was nine, their father was killed in a car accident. Saldaña and her two sisters were sent to live with their late father's family in the Dominican Republic. Their mother remained in New York to earn enough money to pay for her daughters' Dominican private school.

Her widowed mother, Asalia, married Dagoberto Galán, who became the girls' stepfather. They consider him their father. While the whole family lived in the Dominican Republic for a time, after Saldaña's sophomore year in high school, the family returned to New York City to escape political unrest. She completed her early education at Newtown High School in Queens. The majority of her late childhood was spent in Jackson Heights, Queens.

Saldaña discovered her love of dance while living in the Dominican Republic. She was enrolled in the ECOS Espacio de Danza Academy studying forms of dance, but describes ballet as her passion. She told Vanity Fair that she quit ballet because she did not "have the feet", and had too much pride and ambition to just be in the corps de ballet.

In 1995, Saldaña performed with the Faces theater group in Brooklyn. During these years, she performed with the New York Youth Theater. Her appearance in their production of Joseph and the Amazing Technicolor Dreamcoat led a talent agency to recruit her. Her dance training and her acting experience helped her land her first film role, playing ballet student Eva Rodriguez in Center Stage (2000).

== Career ==
=== 1999–2008: Rise to prominence ===
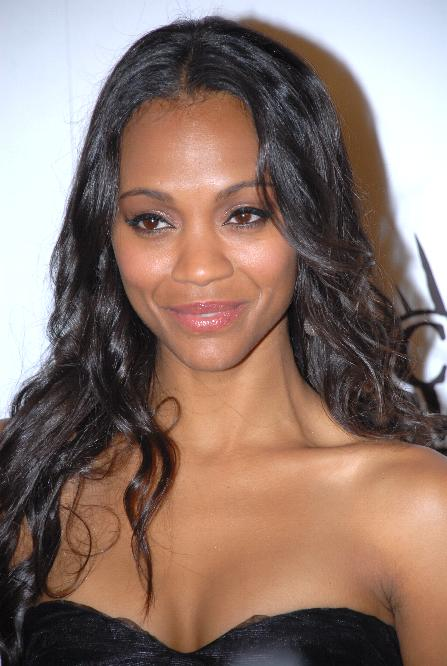
Saldaña at Hollywood Life Magazine's Annual Breakthrough Awards in 2007

Saldaña's first on-screen role was a 1999 guest appearance in an episode of Law & Order. Her first film role was in Center Stage (2000), directed by Nicholas Hytner, about dancers at the fictitious American Ballet Academy in New York City. She appeared in the Britney Spears vehicle Crossroads (2002). The film earned negative reviews from critics, but was a box-office success. Saldaña starred in the comedy-drama Drumline (2002), alongside Nick Cannon, earning mixed reviews.

In Pirates of the Caribbean: The Curse of the Black Pearl (2003), she played Anamaria, a pirate joining Will Turner and Mr. Gibbs for a chance to confront Jack Sparrow for stealing her ship. She appeared in The Terminal (2004) as Dolores Torres, an immigration officer and Star Trek fan, a role helping Saldaña during her portrayal in the Star Trek reboot (2009). In 2004, she had roles in Haven and Temptation; both earned little-to-no box-office success.

In 2005, Saldaña appeared in Constellation, Guess Who with Ashton Kutcher, and Dirty Deeds. She starred in the romantic comedy-dramas Premium (2006) and After Sex (2007). Saldaña starred in Blackout, a television film set in New York City during the Northeast Blackout of 2003. The film premiered at the 2007 Zurich Film Festival, and debuted on BET in 2008. Saldaña had a supporting role as Angie Jones in the action thriller Vantage Point (2008).

=== 2009–2019: Franchise roles ===
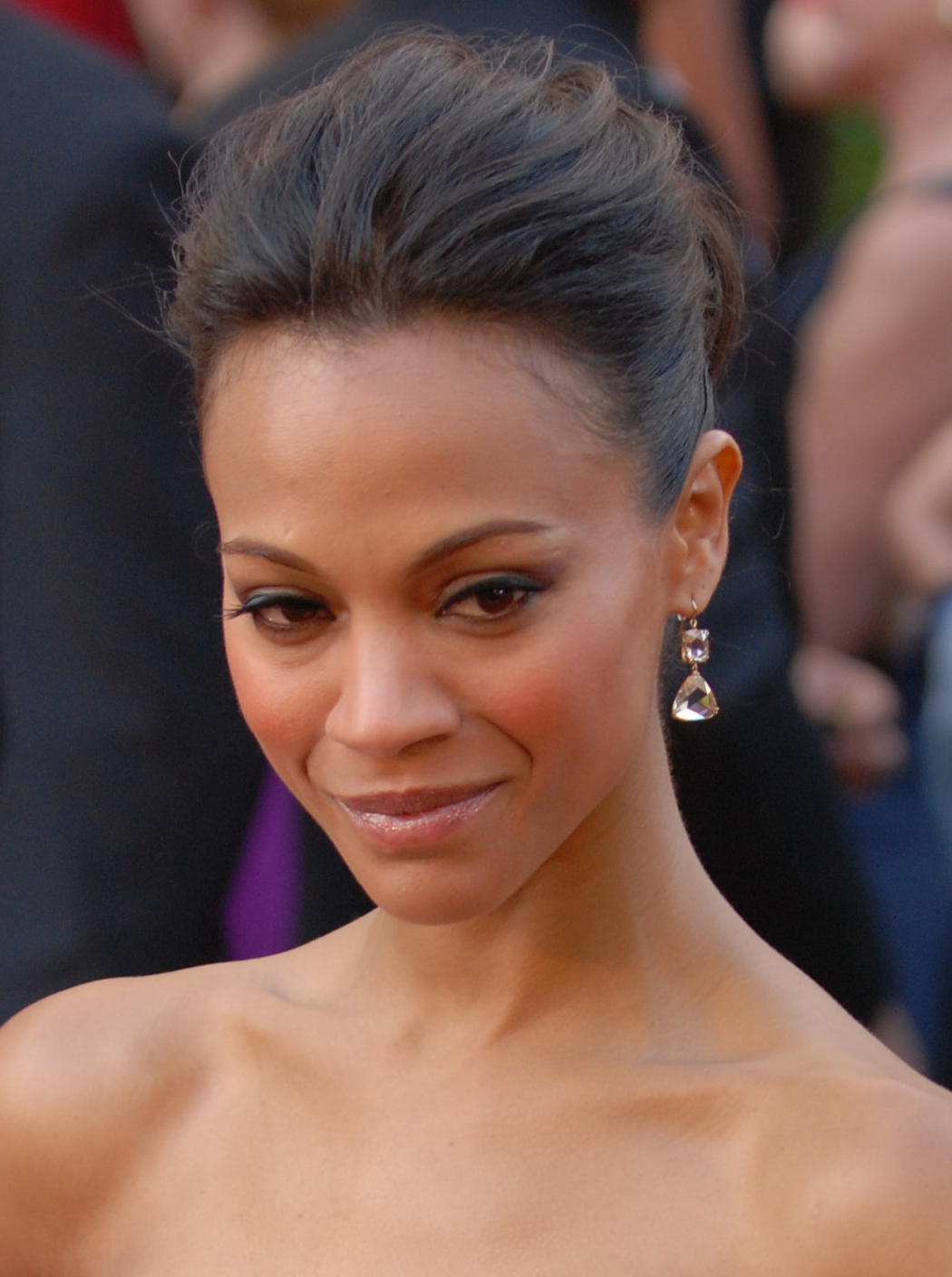
Saldaña at the 82nd Academy Awards in 2010

Saldaña appeared in two roles in 2009 that raised her profile considerably. She played Nyota Uhura in Star Trek. The film's director J. J. Abrams asked Saldaña to play the role because he enjoyed her work. She met with Nichelle Nichols to understand the creation of Uhura's background and name of the character. Saldaña's mother was a Star Trek fan, and left her voice-mails during filming, advising on the role. Steven Spielberg had taught her the Vulcan salute five years earlier while he directed her in The Terminal. Star Trek (2009) was a box-office success earning $385.7 million.

Saldaña's second high-profile film in 2009 was Avatar, where she portrayed the indigenous hunter Neytiri. Avatar was well received by critics, with an approval rating of 81% on the review aggregator website Rotten Tomatoes. It grossed $2.7 billion worldwide to become the highest-grossing film of all time, as well as specifically in the United States and Canada. It became the first film to gross more than $2 billion worldwide.

The film was nominated for ten Saturn Awards, and won all ten at the 36th Saturn Awards ceremony. Saldaña's Saturn Award for Best Actress win marked a rare occurrence for an all-CG character.

In 2010, Saldaña performed in The Losers as Aisha al-Fadhil, a native Bolivian woman. She loved the physicality of the ruthless assassin, citing her youth and athletic background for letting her really jump in and get thrown around and do her own kicks. Saldaña playfully recounted having to bulk up in order to carry the weapons while filming over eight hours a day. In 2010, she appeared in Takers, Death at a Funeral, and Burning Palms. Her television ad for Calvin Klein's "Envy" line debuted in 2010. In 2011, Saldaña starred in the romantic comedy The Heart Specialist, and portrayed assassin Cataleya Restrepo in the crime drama Colombiana. Although the latter film earned negative reviews from critics, Saldaña's performance was praised.

In 2012, she appeared in the romantic drama The Words, earning negative reviews from critics and little success at the box-office.

In 2013, Saldaña reprised her role as Uhura in Star Trek Into Darkness, the sequel to the Star Trek reboot. Like the previous film, it was a box-office success, ending its North American theater run with a box office total of $228,778,661, placing it as the eleventh-highest-grossing film of 2013. It earned $467,365,246 worldwide, ranking it in 14th place for 2013, and making it the highest-grossing film of the franchise. Saldaña voiced her character in the 2013 release of the Star Trek video game.

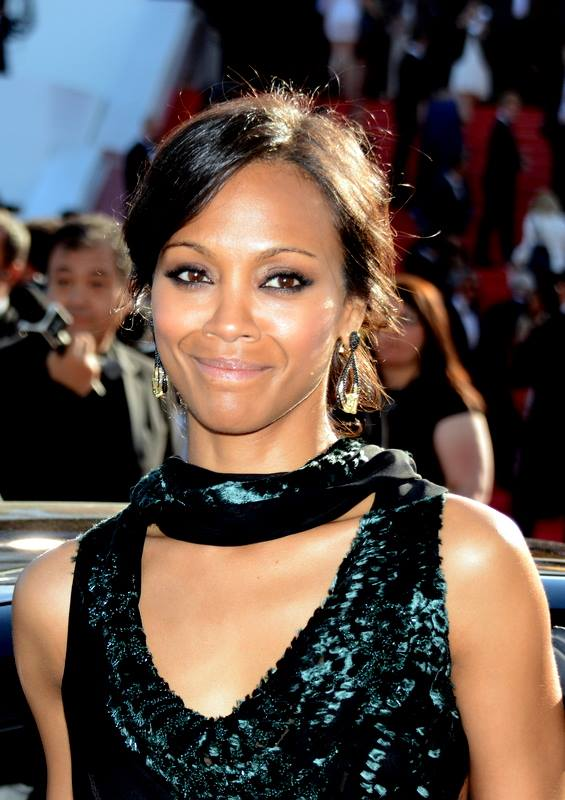
Saldaña at the 2014 Cannes Film Festival

In 2014, Saldaña played Gamora in Guardians of the Galaxy. Saldaña portrayed the character with make-up rather than computer generated imagery (CGI) or performance capture. The film became the third-highest-grossing film in the Marvel Cinematic Universe, behind The Avengers and Iron Man 3. It was the third-highest-grossing 2014 film (behind Transformers: Age of Extinction and The Hobbit: The Battle of the Five Armies), and the highest-grossing superhero film of 2014.

The film earned positive reviews. Saldaña was nominated for numerous awards for her work in the film, including Critics' Choice Movie Award for Best Actress in an Action Movie, Favorite Action Movie Actress at the People's Choice Awards, and Best On-Screen Transformation at the MTV Movie Awards.

In May 2014, she performed in Rosemary's Baby, a television mini-series adaptation of Ira Levin's horror novel. Saldaña also co-produced the four-hour two-part show. In 2014, Saldaña was recognized by Elle magazine during The Women in Hollywood Awards. Women were honored for achievements in film and the motion-picture industry, including acting, directing, and producing.

Saldaña starred in Nina (2016), an unauthorized biography about the jazz musician Nina Simone. The film depicts the late singer's rise to fame and relationship with her manager Clifton Henderson. Simone's family criticized Saldaña's being cast in this role. In August 2020, Saldaña apologized for taking the role, saying "I'm so sorry. I know better today and I'm never going to do that again. She's one of our giants and someone else should step up. Somebody else should tell her story."

In 2016, she co-starred in the second sequel Star Trek Beyond released in July, and Ben Affleck's crime drama Live by Night released in December.

Saldaña returned as Gamora in the Guardians of the Galaxy sequel, Guardians of the Galaxy Vol. 2, released in May 2017. She reprised the role in Avengers: Infinity War (2018) and its sequel Avengers: Endgame (2019), albeit as an alternate version of the character in the latter film. She returned in this role in Guardians of the Galaxy Vol. 3 (2023), her last film in the MCU as Gamora.

Also in 2017, Saldaña played Mrs. Mollé in I Kill Giants, Anders Walter's adaptation of Joe Kelly's graphic novel I Kill Giants. Shooting commenced in Ireland in September 2016. Also that year, she appeared in the animated film My Little Pony: The Movie, performing the voice of pirate parrot Captain Celaeno.

On May 3, 2018, she received a star at 6920 Hollywood Boulevard in the Motion Pictures section of the Hollywood Walk of Fame.

=== 2020–present: Career expansion ===
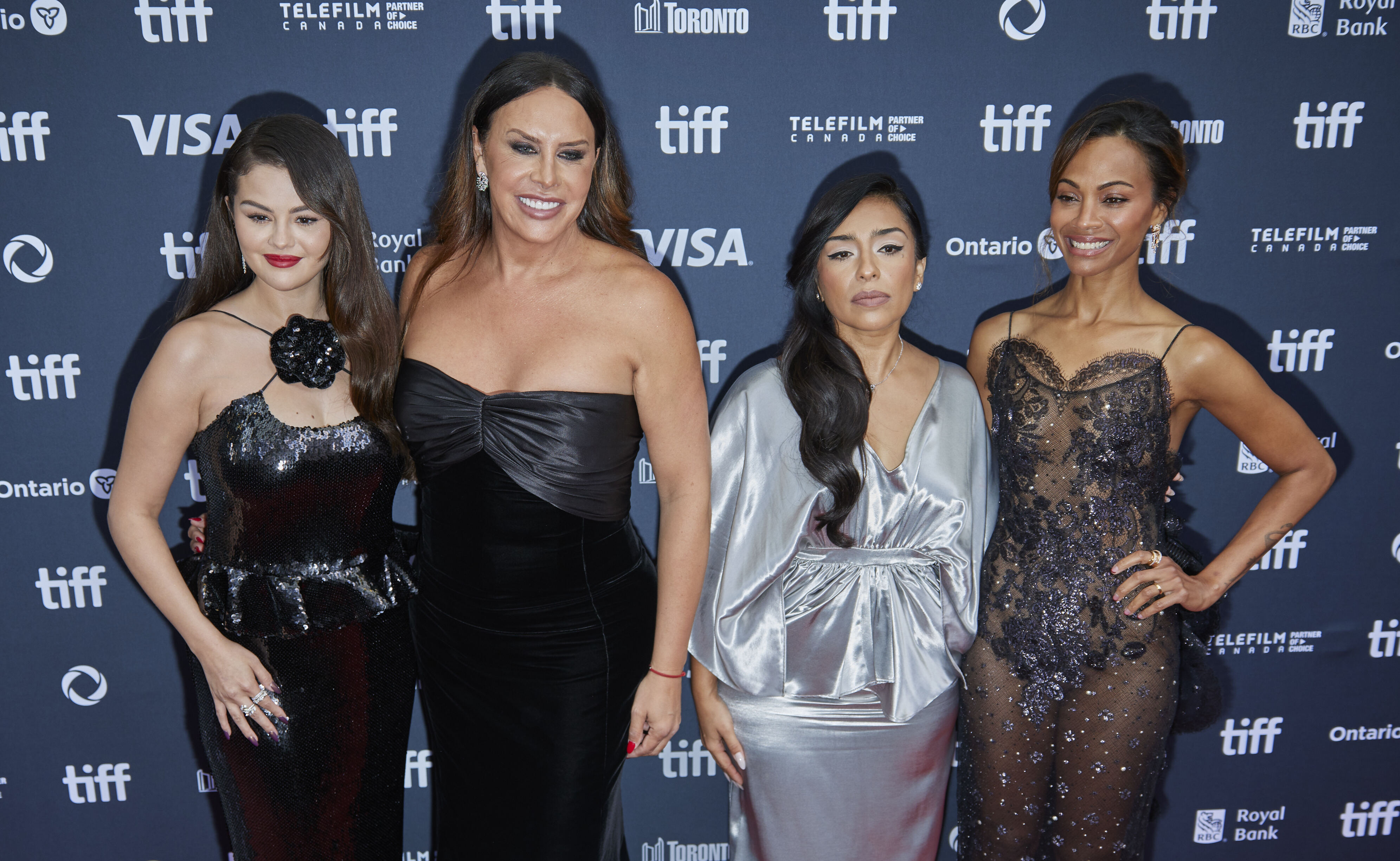
Saldaña with her co-stars of Emilia Pérez (2024), all of whom were awarded the Cannes Film Festival Award for Best Actress, at the 2024 Toronto International Film Festival

In 2021, Saldaña starred in two Netflix productions, appearing as Rosita in the musical Vivo and as the titular character in Maya and the Three. She joined the all-star cast in David O. Russell's Amsterdam. Saldaña reprised her role as Neytiri in Avatar: The Way of Water (2022). As part of her role, she performed vocals for the original song "The Songcord" on the film's soundtrack, penned by Simon Franglen. She also began starring in the Paramount+ spy thriller television series Special Ops: Lioness, created by Taylor Sheridan, in 2023.

She played Rita Mora Castro, a high-powered junior criminal defense attorney in the controversial musical crime film Emilia Pérez (2024), receiving critical acclaim and sharing the Cannes Film Festival Award for Best Actress with her co-stars (Karla Sofía Gascón, Selena Gomez, and Adriana Paz). Saldaña also won the BAFTA Award for Best Actress in a Supporting Role, the Golden Globe Award for Best Supporting Actress – Motion Picture, the Actor Award for Outstanding Performance by a Female Actor in a Supporting Role, and the Academy Award for Best Supporting Actress. She is the first Dominican American actress to win an Academy Award.

In addition to the Avatar sequels, Saldaña had a voice role in the Pixar science fiction adventure film Elio (2025). After the release of Avatar: Fire and Ash, Saldaña became the highest grossing actress of all time.

== Personal life ==
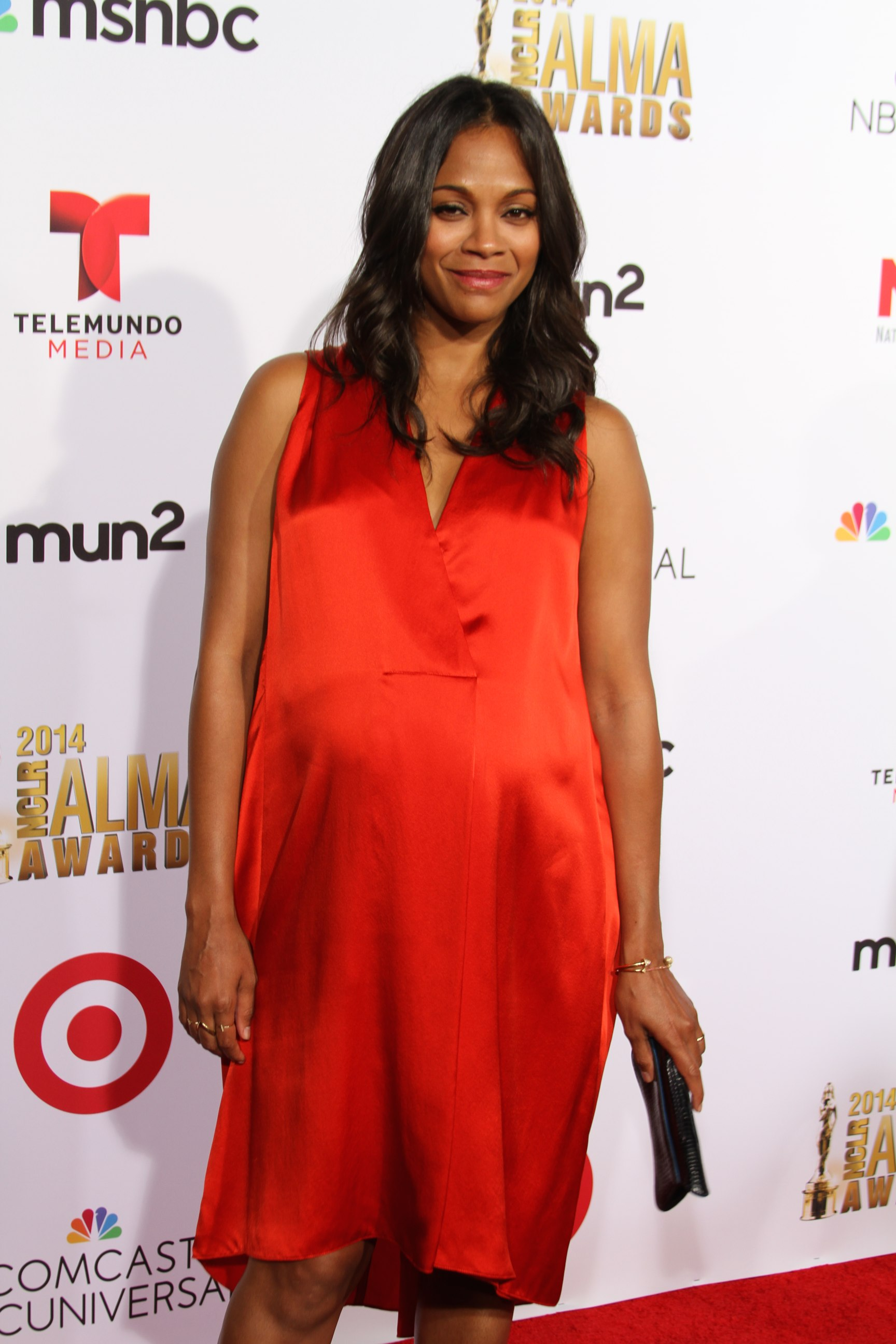
Saldaña at the 2014 ALMA Awards

In June 2010, Saldaña was engaged to her longtime boyfriend Keith Britton, an actor and the CEO of My Fashion Database. In November 2011, she and Britton announced they had ended their relationship after eleven years. Saldaña was in a relationship with actor Bradley Cooper from December 2011 to January 2013.

In March 2013, Saldaña began dating Italian artist Marco Perego and they married three months later in London. In July 2015, Saldaña revealed Perego adopted her surname upon marriage. Thereafter, Zoë became Zoë Saldaña-Perego and Marco became Marco Perego-Saldaña. They have three sons together. Saldaña has stated her children will be multi-lingual because she and her husband speak Spanish, Italian, and English around them.

In July 2016, during an interview with Net-a-Porter's The Edit, Saldaña revealed she has Hashimoto's thyroiditis, an autoimmune disease, along with her mother and sisters. To combat the effects of this disease, Saldaña said she and her husband adhere to a gluten- and dairy-free diet. Saldaña is a supporter of FINCA International, a microfinance organization. In 2017, she founded BESE, a digital media platform designed to "combat the lack of diversity in the mainstream media" with an interest on positive stories within the Latino community. In September 2020, Saldaña used her social media presence to participate in the VoteRiders #IDCheck Challenge to help spread the word about voter ID requirements for that year's presidential election.

In October 2023, Saldaña signed the "No Hostage Left Behind" open letter in support of the desire for "Freedom for Israelis and Palestinians to live side by side in peace. Freedom from the brutal violence spread by Hamas. And most urgently, in this moment, freedom for the hostages".

== Filmography ==
=== Film ===
Year	Title	Role	Notes	Ref.
2000	Center Stage	Eva Rodriguez		
2001	Get Over It	Maggie		
2001	Snipes	Cheryl		
2002	Crossroads	Kit		
2002	Drumline	Laila		
2003	Pirates of the Caribbean: The Curse of the Black Pearl	Anamaria		
2004	The Terminal	Dolores Torres		
2004	Haven	Andrea		
2004	Temptation	Annie		
2005	Constellation	Rosa Boxer		
2005	Guess Who	Theresa Jones		
2005	Dirty Deeds	Rachel Buff		
2005	The Curse of Father Cardona	Flor		
2006	Premium	Charli		
2006	The Heart Specialist	Donna Chaisson		
2007	After Sex	Kat		
2007	Blackout	Claudine		
2008	Vantage Point	Angie Jones		
2009	Star Trek	Nyota Uhura		
2009	The Skeptic	Cassie		
2009	Avatar	Neytiri		
2010	The Losers	Aisha Al-Fadhil		
2010	Takers	Lilli Jansen		
2010	Death at a Funeral	Elaine Barnes		
2010	Burning Palms	Sara Cotton		
2011	Colombiana	Cataleya Restrepo		
2012	The Words	Dora Jansen		
2013	Blood Ties	Vanessa		
2013	Star Trek Into Darkness	Nyota Uhura		
2013	Out of the Furnace	Lena Warren		
2014	Infinitely Polar Bear	Maggie Stuart		
2014	Guardians of the Galaxy	Gamora		
2014	The Book of Life	María Posada (voice)		
2015	Unity	Narrator (voice)		
2016	Nina	Nina Simone		
2016	Star Trek Beyond	Nyota Uhura		
2016	Live by Night	Graciella Corrales		
2017	I Kill Giants	Mrs. Mollé		
2017	My Little Pony: The Movie	Captain Celaeno (voice)		
2017	Guardians of the Galaxy Vol. 2	Gamora		
2018	Avengers: Infinity War	Gamora		
2019	Avengers: Endgame	Gamora		
2019	Missing Link	Adelina Fortnight (voice)		
2020	Vampires vs. the Bronx	Becky		
2021	Vivo	Rosa Hernández (voice)		
2022	The Adam Project	Laura Shane		
2022	Amsterdam	Irma St. Clair		
2022	Avatar: The Way of Water	Neytiri		
2023	Guardians of the Galaxy Vol. 3	Gamora		
2023	The Absence of Eden	Esmee		
2023	Good Burger 2	Herself		
2024	Emilia Pérez	Rita Mora Castro		
2024	Dovecote	Zoe	Short film	
2025	Elio	Olga Solís (voice)		
2025	Avatar: Fire and Ash	Neytiri		
2026	The Bluff	—N/a	Executive producer only	
2026	It's Complicated	—N/a	Short film; executive producer only	

=== Television ===
Year	Title	Role	Notes	Ref.
1999	Law & Order	Belinca	Episode: "Refuge: Part 2"	
2004	Law & Order: Special Victims Unit	Gabrielle Vega	Episode: "Criminal"	
2006–2007	Six Degrees	Regina	Recurring role	
2013	Comedy Bang! Bang!	Herself	Episode: "Zoe Saldana Wears a Tan Blouse & Glasses"	
2014	Rosemary's Baby	Rosemary Woodhouse	Main role; also executive producer	
2016	Lip Sync Battle	Herself	Episode: "Zoe Saldaña vs. Zachary Quinto"	
2020	Home Movie: The Princess Bride	Princess Buttercup	Episode: "Chapter Seven: The Pit of Despair"	
2021	Maya and the Three	Princess Maya (voice)	Main role	
2022	From Scratch	Amy	Main role; also executive producer	
2023	MPower	Herself	Episode: "Gamora"; also executive producer	
2023	Marvel Studios: Assembled	Herself	Episode: "The Making of Guardians of the Galaxy Vol. 3"	
2023–present	Lioness	Joe McNamara	Main role; also executive producer	

=== Video games ===
Year	Title	Voice role	Notes	Ref.
2013	Star Trek	Nyota Uhura	Also likeness	

=== Theme park attractions ===
Year	Title	Role	Venue
2017	Guardians of the Galaxy – Mission Breakout!	Gamora	Disney California Adventure
2022	Guardians of the Galaxy: Cosmic Rewind	Gamora	Epcot

== See also ==
- List of Afro-Latinos
