= Team Lioness =

Group of female U.S. Marines

Team Lioness were female United States Marines attached to combat units in Iraq and Afghanistan. They were deployed to conduct searches of local women during house raids and checkpoint operations, tasks that male soldiers could not perform due to cultural restrictions in local societies. As early precursors to the formal Female Engagement Teams (FETs), Lioness members engaged with Iraqi and Afghan women to gather critical intelligence, build rapport, and disseminate information, roles that enhanced the military’s counterinsurgency efforts by leveraging gendered access to civilian populations.

== Team Lioness ==
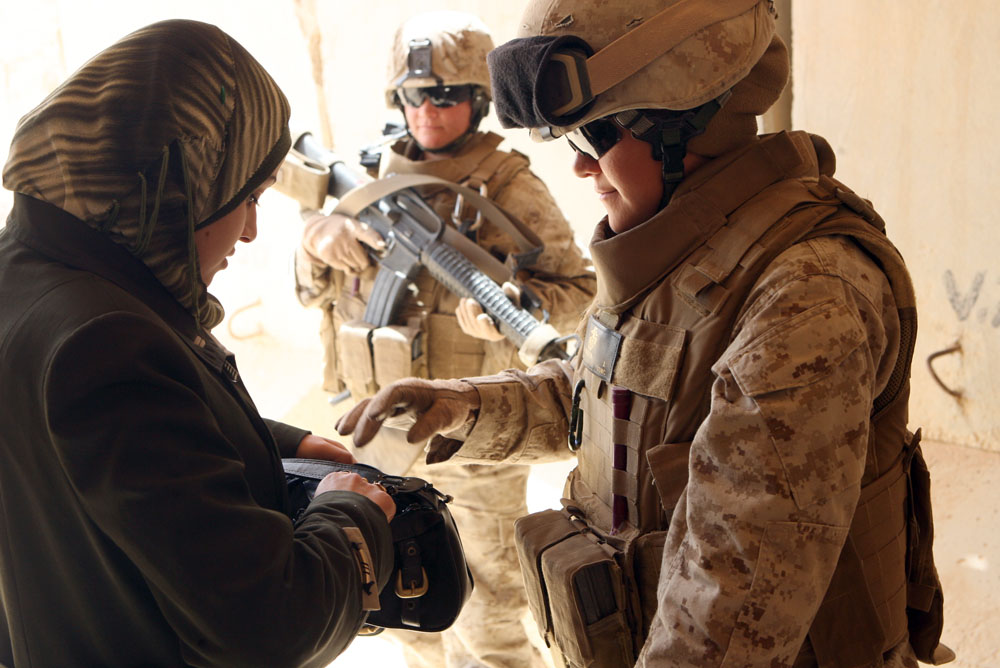
Cpl. Jennifer San Martin, 24, a lioness attached to 3rd Battalion, 23rd Marine Regiment, Regimental Combat Team 5, who is from Katy, Texas, with her Guardian Angel Cpl. Tracy Hauk, 22, from Fenton, Michigan, searches an Iraqi woman as she travels through the checkpoint in Haditha City, Iraq, Saturday.

The original Lioness teams were created for the sole purpose of providing an "acceptable means of searching the female populace." Various studies have been conducted to determine the effectiveness of the Female Engagement Team programs with both positive and negative results. One such study from 2010 by then Major Ginger E. Beals finds that, "both the Lioness and female engagement team programs have proven to be a beneficial capability delivering huge gains by interacting with a portion of the population that the male Marines could not engage."

When Team Lioness was first established, women in the U.S. military faced formal restrictions under the Combat Exclusion Policy (lifted in 2013), which, while allowing women to serve in combat aviation, on combat ships, and aboard submarines, prohibited them from being assigned to ground combat units below the brigade level. Commanders relied on female service members to engage with local women and conduct searches during raids, roles male soldiers could not fulfill due to cultural norms, leading to the rhetorical distinction of “attaching” rather than officially “assigning” them to combat units.

== Documentary ==
A documentary titled Lioness covered one of the first members of Team Lioness in Ramadi, Iraq between 2003 and 2004.

The documentary profiles soldiers like Shannon Morgan from Arkansas who, despite being officially designated as a support soldier, accompanied Army and Marine infantrymen on patrols and engaged in firefights. Because women were barred from assignment to direct ground combat units under the Combat Exclusion Policy, Morgan and others were “attached” to combat teams without formal training alongside those units.
