= Lioness (2008 film) =

- Directed by: Meg McLagan; Daria Sommers
- Cinematography: Julia Dengel; Kirsten Johnson
- Edited by: Stephen T. Maing
- Music by: Brendon Anderegg
- Distributed by: Docurama, Cinedigm
- Release date: April 4, 2008 (Full Frame Documentary Film Festival)
- Running time: 82 minutes
- Country: United States
- Language: English

Lioness is a 2008 documentary film directed by Meg McLagan and Daria Sommers about the first members of Team Lioness. This feature-length documentary tells the story of a group of Army servicewomen who went to Iraq as clerks, mechanics and engineers but ended up fighting alongside the infantryman in some of the bloodiest battles of the Iraq war.

Told through intimate accounts, journal excerpts, archival footage, as well as interviews with military commanders, the film follows five women who were part of an unofficial program called "Team Lioness." The women's candid narratives, coupled with scenes from their lives back home, form a portrait of the emotional and psychological effects of war from a female point of view.

As the first film to shed light on the hidden narrative of women in combat, Lioness interceded in public dialogues about gender and the military, leading to tangible change in a number of arenas by framing an important but largely invisible issue in meaningful, human terms. The film played an important role in influencing legislation and policy discussions in Congress, the VA, and the Department of Defense and was embraced by a national movement of activists and veteran service organizations working to improve care for the unprecedented influx of women returning from Iraq and Afghanistan into the VA system.

== Featured Team Lioness Soldiers ==
Specialist Shannon Morgan, Rebecca Nava, Kate Guttormsen, Anastasia Breslow, Ranie Ruthig.
