= Hollywood Music in Media Award for Best Original Score in an Animated Film =

Annual award for the score of an animated film

Hollywood Music in Media for Best Original Score in an Animated Film
- Country: United States
- Presented by: Hollywood Music in Media Awards (HMMA)
- First award: 2014
- Currently held by: Dario Marianelli; Wildwood (2026)
- Website: www.hmmawards.com

The Hollywood Music in Media Award for Best Original Score in an Animated Film is one of the annual awards given to people working in the motion picture industry by the Hollywood Music in Media Awards (HMMA). It is presented to the composers who have composed the best "original" score, written specifically for an animated motion picture.

== History ==
The award was first given in 2014, during the fifth annual awards. The How to Train Your Dragon film series has the most wins with two.

== Winners and nominees ==
=== 2010s ===
| Year | Film | Winners and nominees |
|---|---|---|
(2014); 5th
| (2014); 5th | How to Train Your Dragon 2 | John Powell |
| (2014); 5th | The Book of Life | Gustavo Santaolalla |
| (2014); 5th | The Boxtrolls | Dario Marianelli |
| (2014); 5th | The Lego Movie | Mark Mothersbaugh |
| (2014); 5th | Mr. Peabody & Sherman | Danny Elfman |
| (2014); 5th | Rocks in My Pockets | Kristian Sensini |
(2015); 6th
| (2015); 6th | The Peanuts Movie | Christophe Beck |
| (2015); 6th | Inside Out | Michael Giacchino |
| (2015); 6th | Minions | Heitor Pereira |
(2016); 7th
| (2016); 7th | The Secret Life of Pets | Alexandre Desplat |
| (2016); 7th | The Angry Birds Movie | Heitor Pereira |
| (2016); 7th | Finding Dory | Thomas Newman |
| (2016); 7th | The Little Prince | Hans Zimmer and Richard Harvey |
| (2016); 7th | Moana | Mark Mancina |
| (2016); 7th | Zootopia | Michael Giacchino |
(2017); 8th
| (2017); 8th | Coco | Michael Giacchino |
| (2017); 8th | The Boss Baby | Hans Zimmer and Steve Mazzaro |
| (2017); 8th | Captain Underpants: The First Epic Movie | Theodore Shapiro |
| (2017); 8th | The Lego Batman Movie | Lorne Balfe |
| (2017); 8th | Loving Vincent | Clint Mansell |
(2018); 9th
| (2018); 9th | Isle of Dogs | Alexandre Desplat |
| (2018); 9th | Incredibles 2 | Michael Giacchino |
| (2018); 9th | Ralph Breaks the Internet | Henry Jackman |
| (2018); 9th | Sherlock Gnomes | Chris Bacon |
| (2018); 9th | Smallfoot | Heitor Pereira |
| (2018); 9th | White Fang | Bruno Coulais |
(2019); 10th
| (2019); 10th | How to Train Your Dragon: The Hidden World | John Powell |
| (2019); 10th | Abominable | Rupert Gregson-Williams |
| (2019); 10th | Buñuel in the Labyrinth of the Turtles | Arturo Cardelús |
| (2019); 10th | Frozen 2 | Christophe Beck |
| (2019); 10th | I Lost My Body | Dan Levy |

=== 2020s ===
| Year | Film | Winners and nominees |
|---|---|---|
(2020); 11th
| (2020); 11th | Soul | Trent Reznor, Atticus Ross and Jon Batiste |
| (2020); 11th | The Croods: A New Age | Mark Mothersbaugh |
| (2020); 11th | Onward | Mychael Danna and Jeff Danna |
| (2020); 11th | A Shaun the Sheep Movie: Farmageddon | Tom Howe |
| (2020); 11th | Wolfwalkers | Bruno Coulais |
(2021); 12th
| (2021); 12th | The Addams Family 2 | Mychael Danna and Jeff Danna |
| (2021); 12th | The Loud House Movie | Philip White |
| (2021); 12th | Luca | Dan Romer |
| (2021); 12th | The Mitchells vs. the Machines | Mark Mothersbaugh |
| (2021); 12th | Spirit Untamed | Amie Doherty |
| (2021); 12th | Vivo | Alex Lacamoire |
(2022); 13th
| (2022); 13th | Guillermo del Toro's Pinocchio | Alexandre Desplat |
| (2022); 13th | DC League of Super-Pets | Steve Jablonsky |
| (2022); 13th | Luck | John Debney |
| (2022); 13th | Puss in Boots: The Last Wish | Heitor Pereira |
| (2022); 13th | The Bad Guys | Daniel Pemberton |
| (2022); 13th | Turning Red | Finneas O'Connell and Ludwig Göransson |
(2023); 14th
| (2023); 14th | Spider-Man: Across the Spider-Verse | Daniel Pemberton |
| (2023); 14th | Chicken Run: Dawn of the Nugget | Harry Gregson-Williams |
| (2023); 14th | Elemental | Thomas Newman |
| (2023); 14th | Migration | John Powell |
| (2023); 14th | Ruby Gillman, Teenage Kraken | Stephanie Economou |
| (2023); 14th | The Super Mario Bros. Movie | Brian Tyler |
(2024); 15th
| (2024); 15th | The Wild Robot | Kris Bowers |
| (2024); 15th | Dragonkeeper | Arturo Cardelús |
| (2024); 15th | Inside Out 2 | Andrea Datzman |
| (2024); 15th | That Christmas | John Powell |
| (2024); 15th | Wallace & Gromit: Vengeance Most Fowl | Lorne Balfe and Julian Nott |
(2025); 16th
| (2025); 16th | Dog Man | Tom Howe |
| (2025); 16th | Arco | Arnaud Toulon |
| (2025); 16th | The Bad Guys 2 | Daniel Pemberton |
| (2025); 16th | Stitch Head | Nick Urata |
| (2025); 16th | Gabby's Dollhouse: The Movie | Stephanie Economou |
(2026); 17th
| (2026); 17th | Wildwood | Dario Marianelli |
| (2026); 17th | Coyote vs. Acme | Steven Price |
| (2026); 17th | Hexed | Kris Bowers |
| (2026); 17th | Ray Gunn | Michael Giacchino |
| (2026); 17th | The Super Mario Galaxy Movie | Brian Tyler |
| (2026); 17th | Toy Story 5 | Randy Newman |
| (2026); 17th | The Violinist | Ricky Ho |

== Multiple winners ==
3 wins

- Alexandre Desplat

2 wins

- John Powell

== Multiple nominations ==
5 nominations

- Michael Giacchino

3 nominations

- Jeff Danna
- Mychael Danna
- Alexandre Desplat
- Mark Mothersbaugh
- Daniel Pemberton
- Heitor Pereira
- John Powell

2 nominations

- Lorne Balfe
- Christophe Beck
- Kris Bowers
- Stephanie Economou
- Tom Howe
- Dario Marianelli
- Thomas Newman
- Brian Tyler
- Hans Zimmer
