= Ruby Gillman, Teenage Kraken =

2023 animated teen comedy film

- Theatrical release poster
- Directed by: Kirk DeMicco
- Written by: Pam Brady; Brian C. Brown; Elliott DiGuiseppi
- Produced by: Kelly Cooney Cilella
- Starring: Lana Condor; Toni Collette; Annie Murphy; Colman Domingo; Jane Fonda
- Cinematography: Jon Gutman
- Edited by: Michelle Mendenhall
- Music by: Stephanie Economou
- Production company: DreamWorks Animation
- Distributed by: Universal Pictures
- Release dates: June 15, 2023 (Annecy); June 30, 2023 (United States)
- Running time: 91 minutes
- Country: United States
- Language: English
- Budget: $70 million
- Box office: $46.2 million

Ruby Gillman, Teenage Kraken is a 2023 American animated teen comedy film directed by Kirk DeMicco and written by Brian C. Brown, Elliott DiGuiseppi and Pam Brady. Produced by DreamWorks Animation, it stars the voices of Lana Condor, Toni Collette, Annie Murphy, Colman Domingo, and Jane Fonda. The film follows a shy Kraken girl named Ruby Gillman (Condor) who is desperate to fit in at Oceanside High. When she breaks her mother's (Collette) rule by going into the ocean with any would-be friends, she discovers that she is a direct descendant of battle-hardened krakens who have protected the sea from evil mermaids for generations, and is also destined to inherit the throne from her grandmother (Fonda).

Ruby Gillman, Teenage Kraken had its world premiere at the Annecy International Animation Film Festival on June 15, 2023, and was released in the United States by Universal Pictures on June 30. The film received mixed reviews from critics and was a box-office bomb, grossing $46 million against a $70 million budget, which made it DreamWorks Animation's second-lowest-grossing film to date (after Spirit Untamed in 2021) and their second computer animated film to make less than its budget (following Trolls World Tour, which was affected by the COVID-19 pandemic, in 2020).

== Plot ==
In the town of Oceanside, Ruby Gillman and her family are secretly krakens. Determined to fit in with humans, Ruby's mother Agatha forbids her from going near the ocean, including her school's prom at sea. Ruby's friends Margot, Trevin, and Bliss convince her to ask out her crush Connor anyway, but she accidentally knocks him into the water. Ruby jumps in and saves Connor — unknowingly triggering an underwater transformation — but new student Chelsea Van Der Zee takes the credit. Noticing bioluminescent suction cups on her fingers, Ruby hides in the school library while going through an anxiety attack, but transforms into a giant kraken. She is spotted by Chelsea and Agatha, whose ocean-dwelling brother and Ruby's uncle Brill has been summoned by Ruby's transformation.

Agatha calms her distressed daughter down to human size, and Ruby confronts her parents, who explain that the women in their family turn into powerful Giant Krakens while underwater, much to Ruby's ire and distress. With Brill's reluctant help, Ruby sneaks into the ocean to go to the Kingdom of the Krakens, where she meets her grandmother Grandmamah, the Warrior Queen of the Seven Seas, who reveals that Ruby is in line to rule as protector of the ocean. Other creatures have tried to seize power, including leviathans, umibōzu, and most dangerous of all, mermaids. The evil mermaid queen Nerissa found the Trident of Oceanus but was defeated by Agatha, who hid the trident before abandoning her kingdom for a life on land. Returning home, Ruby is attacked by vengeful sea captain Gordon Lighthouse, but is saved by Chelsea, who is actually a mermaid.

Gordon's footage of Ruby in her kraken form goes viral, but Chelsea befriends Ruby, taking her on a "Super Sea Girl Ditch Day", and suggests that by finding the trident, they can end the war between krakens and mermaids; her mother, Nerissa, was killed trying to recover the trident from the Well of Seas. Meanwhile, Agatha arranges her husband and Ruby's father Arthur, her son and Ruby's younger brother Sam, and Brill to be hired by Gordon as monster hunters in order to keep their kraken identities a secret. After Ruby has an unsuccessful attempt to obtain the Trident of Oceanus, Grandmamah trains her granddaughter to master her kraken powers, but is unaware Ruby is using them to practice entering the Well of Seas, while Ruby neglects her friends to spend more time with Chelsea. Meanwhile, Arthur, Sam, and Brill trick Gordon into "capturing" their pet sea creature Nessie, making him believe he has ended the kraken threat. During an open house party, Ruby tries to introduce Chelsea to her mother, but Agatha is unwilling to trust a mermaid and forbids her daughter from returning to the ocean, infuriating Ruby as she transforms and storms off.

Agatha confronts Grandmamah, who discloses that Nerissa never had a daughter, much to Agatha's horror as she realizes Ruby is in danger. Simultaneously, Ruby retrieves the trident from the Well of Seas but is soon betrayed by Chelsea, who reveals herself to be Nerissa and takes the trident for her goal of revenge against Agatha. After trapping Ruby underwater, Nerissa surfaces with the trident to terrorize Oceanside, interrupting prom night before she soon fights off Agatha and Grandmamah when they both confront her. With encouragement from Brill who tells her Agatha chose to raise and protect her over inheriting the throne, Ruby arrives to face Nerissa and saves the prom ship, with assistance from Agatha, Arthur and Sam. Combining their powers, Ruby, Agatha, and Grandmamah destroy the trident, and Nerissa is captured by Gordon. Ruby's classmates hail her as their Kraken hero and she reunites with her family and friends, and also makes it to prom in a new dress where Connor accepts her invitation, and Agatha and Grandmamah reconcile with each other while also making amends with Brill.

Sometime later, Ruby and her family have embraced their identities as krakens, while Ruby and Connor become a couple. Brill warns that a Devil Whale is heading toward the Kingdom of the Krakens, and Ruby leaps into action as the protector of the seas.

== Voice cast ==
- Lana Condor as Ruby Gillman, a shy 16-year-old kraken girl who is desperate to fit in at Oceanside High and has the ability to turn into a giant three-legged kraken when she is in the ocean like all royal female krakens do. She is described by the film's producer Kelly Cooney Cilella as "a really normal teenager".
- Toni Collette as Agatha Gillman, Ruby's overprotective real estate agent mother who has the ability to turn into a giant four-legged kraken when she is in the ocean.
- Annie Murphy as Chelsea Van Der Zee, the snobbish, popular new girl at Oceanside High. She is secretly Queen Nerissa, the evil queen of the mermaids with a vendetta against the Gillman family.
- Colman Domingo as Arthur Gillman, Agatha's husband and Ruby's supportive father.
- Blue Chapman as Sam Gillman, Ruby's 7-year-old energetic and loyal younger brother who loves to play dodge ball. He is loosely based on co-writer Brian C. Brown.
- Jane Fonda as Queen Gillman aka. Grandmamah, the Warrior Queen of the Seven Seas, the mother of Agatha, and Ruby and Sam's maternal grandmother.
- Sam Richardson as Brill Gillman, a kraken male who is Ruby's dim-witted and enthusiastic maternal uncle, Grandmamah's son and Agatha's brother.
- Will Forte as Captain Gordon Lighthouse, a kraken-obsessed old sailor with a peg leg who works as a tour guide and has a crab named "Davy".
- Jaboukie Young-White as Connor, a skater-boy who became Ruby's love interest.
- Liza Koshy as Margot, a dramatic girl and Ruby's best friend.
- Eduardo Franco as Trevin, a gamer and one of Ruby's friends.
- Ramona Young as Bliss, a goth girl and one of Ruby's friends.

Additionally, Echo Kellum and Nicole Byer respectively voice Doug and Janice, Internet personalities Preston and Bri Arsement portray a home buyer and a tourist respectively, Internet film commentator Juju Green voices a gym teacher, father and daughter webstars Jordan Matter and Salish portray the school principal and a kraken kid respectively, sound designer Randy Thom voices the Gillman family's pet sea creature Nessie and a confetti cannon, Spirit Untamed producer Karen Foster voices the school librarian, newcomer Atticus Shaindlin voices Topher, folk musician-songwriter Suzanne Buirgy voices Carol, and vlogger/podcaster Emma Chamberlain voices a reporter.

== Production ==
=== Development ===
The film's original title.

By June 27, 2015 Screenwriters Brian C. Brown and Elliott DiGuiseppi initially pitched the story of a family of sea monsters living on land in plain sight to Chris Kuser, a development executive at DreamWorks Animation. Titled Meet the Gillmans, the script drew from their shared memories of growing up in Oviedo, Florida as well as Brown's personal experiences as a first generation Cuban American, the Gillman family is loosely based on Brown's real-life family.

First time feature producer Kelly Cooney Cilella came on board as producer in April 2019. She previously worked as a story coordinator on Shrek 2, a development executive at DreamWorks Animation and a producer on the short film Bilby.

With original director Paul Tibbitt at the helm, and the addition of another writer, Neighbors from Hell creator Pam Brady, the film slowly started moving forward. In 2020, Faryn Pearl, who had known Cooney Cilella while working on Trolls World Tour came on board as the film's first head of story.

Cooney Cilella assembled her crew for the film, with Pierre-Oliver Vincent as production designer and Dave Walvoord as visual effects supervisor, the two having worked together in their respective roles on How to Train Your Dragon 2 and How to Train Your Dragon: The Hidden World. Jon Gutman as Head of Layout, who had worked on this position on The Croods: A New Age. First time lead editor Michelle Mendenhall, and first time art director Frederic William Stewart gave the film a unique look, and promoted some of the employees who worked on Trolls World Tour into first time leadership roles during the production, and also brought in some talent from DreamWorks's TV division for this film.

Cooney Cilella wanted to bring the film in a new direction, so after Tibbitt stepped down from his role as director, she contacted Kirk DeMicco, who had most recently directed the 2021 film Vivo to be director with Pearl being promoted as co-director. Tibbitt was credited in the final film under "special thanks".

Additional material for the film's screenplay was provided by Baby Mama writer/director Michael McCullers, Meghan Malloy, and the film's co-directors.

In June 2021, website TheGWW reported the film to be in production. Production was also expected to start in 2022. On March 14, 2023, the cast and crew were announced via Universal Pictures International Ireland's website. Many of the main cast was confirmed, while the director, co-director and producer were confirmed also respectively. DreamWorks Animation also announced its official title as Ruby Gillman, Teenage Kraken. The cast, crew, and official title were publicly announced two days later. Following the release of the film's second trailer in May 2023, Mike Mitchell, a longtime DreamWorks director who had recently set up his own production company Mike Mitchell Productions, was revealed to have served as executive producer.

Animation Magazine reports Cooney Cilella has been working on the film for several years. It was first pitched to DreamWorks about a family of sea monsters that were moved to the land and are hiding in plain sight. She stated: "Our heroine is such a lovable character and I'm so excited for audiences to meet her and fall in love with her the way we have because she starts the movie as a quirky, slightly insecure but bighearted character, but she's harboring a secret that she can't tell her friends." DeMicco stated that he cited John Hughes films, Easy A (2010), Lady Bird (2017) and Booksmart (2019) as his inspirations. Pierre-Olivier Vincent serves as the production designer, taking inspiration for the main character from the body of an octopus and bringing the "curviness to all the design language of the film", from the cars to the underwater world.

When asked if there had been plans for the mermaid world to be shown in the film, DeMicco stated; "there was an opportunity, but we had to make choices. And, so we always felt like if we had done that, we would've lost so much of the time, the personality of who is really getting to know Chelsea. And it worked well for our themes of the fact that they are all in hiding." In addition, he said that there were other story ideas that were cut from the film, such as some of the monsters shown in the statue room that were originally intended to be featured in the story.

The film was dedicated to Nick Levenduski, a crowds artist on the film who died before the film was released.

=== Animation and design ===
Character designers Timothy Lamb & Guillermo "Willie" Real designed hundreds of different design iterations of Ruby and her family, eventually leading to the final look modeled by Charles Ellison, with additional tweaks by modeler Hannah Kang, character look development supervisor Megan Lea Walker, and look development artists, Andy Harbeck and Rachael Yang. Additional characters were designed by Craig Kellman, character designer of The Bad Guys Taylor Krahenbahl, Julien Le Rolland and many others.

For the design of the hair of Nerissa during the film's climactic battle, the visual effects department created a Fluid Implicit Particle simulation which was used to simulate the character's interaction with the surrounding ocean. With an additional level set fillet generation technique was used to blend the ocean mesh with the water hair geometry.

Two mixed-media sequences for the film were designed and animated by Richard Ramazinski.

== Music ==
Stephanie Economou composed the film's score. British singer-songwriter Mimi Webb performed the original song "This Moment", released on June 23 as a single, a week before the film's release. The song was a last minute addition after using a temp song "As It Was" by Harry Styles in a particular scene in the film, where it was replaced by "This Moment", which was written by DallasK, Lauv, Jacob Kasher and Amanda "Kiddo A.I." Ibanez, and was originally going to be performed by Lauv, but he passed on it and it was given to Webb. The soundtrack album was released on June 30, 2023, the same day as the theatrical release, in addition to the original song "Rise" performed by Freya Ridings, which plays during the end credits. She first performed the song live 3 days earlier at DreamWorks's Glendale campus.

== Release ==
=== Theatrical ===
Ruby Gillman, Teenage Kraken debuted at the Annecy International Animation Film Festival on June 15, 2023, and was theatrically released in the United States on June 30. The film was screened early on June 19, 2023, at various Regal Cinemas theaters as part of the chain's "Monday Mystery Movie" promotion.

In December 2022, Deputy Manager Director of Universal Pictures International Italy Massimo Proietti revealed that the film would be released in mid-2023. On March 16, 2023, following the release of the first trailer, it was revealed that the film would be released on June 30, 2023, taking over the original release date of Illumination's Migration.

=== Home media ===
Ruby Gillman, Teenage Kraken was released on Digital HD on July 18, 2023, 18 days after its theatrical release. It was released on DVD and Blu-ray on September 26, 2023.

=== Streaming ===
When the film was released to Netflix on February 20, 2024, it became the most watched movie on the platform, having topped the chart for three days, and three weeks in the top 10 chart. It was seen by over 12.3 million viewers.

== Reception ==
=== Box office ===
Ruby Gillman, Teenage Kraken grossed $15.7 million in the United States and Canada, and $30.5 million in other territories, for a worldwide gross of $46.2 million. The film is the second-lowest-grossing film from DreamWorks Animation after Spirit Untamed in 2021, and was considered by analysts to be a box-office bomb.

In the United States and Canada, Ruby Gillman, Teenage Kraken was released alongside Indiana Jones and the Dial of Destiny. The film made $2.3 million on its first day, including $725,000 from Thursday night previews. The film debuted with $5.5 million, becoming DreamWorks Animation's lowest-grossing opening weekend of any of their feature films to date. The film's sixth-place finish also made it the studio's lowest-ranking three-day opening weekend, tying with Sinbad: Legend of the Seven Seas (2003). Several publications attributed the reasons for its low opening to the film's limited three-month marketing, unclear target age group, an original film not based on an existing IP, its title, the trailers, and competition from Spider-Man: Across the Spider-Verse and Elemental.

=== Critical response ===
On the review aggregator website Rotten Tomatoes, 65% of 105 critics' reviews are positive, with an average rating of 5.8/10. The website's consensus reads: "Ruby Gillman, Teenage Kraken is littered with too much flotsam and jetsam from better animated features to stand as a true original, but its inherent sweetness and lively style make for likable enough family entertainment." Metacritic, which uses a weighted average, assigned the film a score of 50 out of 100, based on 27 critics, indicating "mixed or average" reviews. Audiences polled by CinemaScore gave the film an average grade of "A–" on an A+ to F scale, while PostTrak reported 68% of filmgoers gave it a positive score.

Peter Debruge of Variety gave the film a positive review, writing, "South Park veteran Pam Brady, who shares screenwriting credit with Brian C. Brown and Elliott DiGuiseppi, brings all kinds of funny ideas to the film, which DeMicco does an admirable job of executing. But there's a simpler, more sincere movie underneath it all that seems to be taunting audiences, like a glowing shape from deep below." Tara McNamara of Common Sense Media gave the film 4 out of 5 stars, writing: "A parenting gold mine, this literal fish out of water story is completely entertaining and enjoyable for all ages, with plenty of positive messages. The message to kids can be applied in a variety of ways: "shine your light"." Kate Erbland of IndieWire gave the film a C+, and wrote in her review, "Kids are always in need of gracious tales about the power of being yourself in a world not necessarily built to embrace differences and stories like "Ruby Gillman, Teenage Kraken" can do that, with fun to spare. But why not get more splashy?"

Other critics felt that the storyline was underdeveloped and that the film failed to live up to its potential. Rachel LeBonte of Screen Rant rates it 2.5 out of 5 stars, calling the film "endearing" and praising the voice cast, but saying that it may have trouble making an impression with so many other options. She wrote, "That is Ruby Gillman, Teenage Kraken's biggest flaw: It doesn't go beyond surface-level. As Ruby gets more involved with the ocean and her burgeoning friendship with fellow sea creature Chelsea, her ties to the human world fall away, lessening the overall impact of her arc." Leigh Paatsch of Herald Sun awarded the film 1.5 out of 5 stars, writing, "Visually, the movie becomes more of an eyesore as it slithers along, while the story mashes up some confusing marine mythology with contemporary plotting points seen to better effect in Pixar's recent release Turning Red." James Berardinelli, film critic for ReelViews, awarded the film 2 out of 4, stars writing, "Ruby Gillman, Teenage Kraken is one of the most inconsequential big-screen cartoons to reach theaters this year." In a 3 out of 5 review, Tara Brady of The Irish Times called it "a likable film that can't decide if it's a Turning Red-style menstrual metaphor, a generational conflict story, a Nickelodeon teen diary sitcom, or Harry Potter except with creatures of the deep."

Alonso Duralde of The Film Verdict gave the film a negative review, writing, "Plays like the result of feeding the screenplays of recent Pixar titles Luca and Turning Red into ChatGPT and then animating the results. Unfortunately, this new coming-of-age tale doesn't come anywhere near the depth or delight of its predecessors." Greg Nussen of Slant Magazine awarded the film 2 out of 4 stars, writing, "Sweet but narratively thin and didactic, the latest from DreamWorks Animation always seems as if it's trying to find its footing." Robert Kojder of Flickering Myth gave the film a negative review, writing "Even though the voiceover performances and some character relationship dynamics are serviceable, Ruby Gillman, Teenage Kraken drowns itself in flat animation, questionable plot choices, and too many ideas."

=== Accolades ===
Accolades received by Ruby Gillman, Teenage Kraken
Award	Date of ceremony	Category	Recipient(s)	Result	Ref.
Hollywood Music in Media Awards	November 15, 2023	Best Original Score in an Animated Film	Stephanie Economou	Nominated	
Annie Awards	February 17, 2024	Outstanding Achievement for Character Animation in an Animated Feature Production	Prashanth Cavale	Nominated	
