= Laila Lockhart Kraner =

American actress

- Occupation: Actress
- Years active: 2016-present

Laila Lockhart Kraner is an American actress best known for starring as Gabby in the DreamWorks Animation Television interactive television series Gabby's Dollhouse. She reprised the role in Gabby's Dollhouse: The Movie (2025), a live-action animated musical fantasy comedy film.

== Early life ==
Laila's father is of Dominican ancestry, while her mother is a Jew of Russian-Jewish ancestry.

== Career ==
Even though her professional career didn't begin until 2019, Laila began acting at the age of five. In 2019, Laila made her professional debut when she landed the lead role of Gabby in the Netflix interactive television series Gabby's Dollhouse when she brought her pet cat and a puppet made from a modified stuffed animal to her audition.

== Personal life ==
In a 2025 interview with USA Today, Laila described herself as having "a pretty normal life" who enjoys shopping, playing guitar, drawing and going to the movies with friends.

== Filmography ==
=== Film ===
Year	Title	Role	Notes
2021	The Secret of Sinchanae	Ava Donovan	
2023	The Ticket Trap	Olive	Short film
2025	Gabby's Dollhouse: The Movie	Gabby (also voice)	

=== TV ===
Year	Title	Role	Notes
2016-2018	Black-ish	Young Rainbow Johnson	Four episodes
2017	Shots Fired	Kai	Five episodes
2019	NOS4A2	Kid #3	"Scissors for the Drifter" (season 1, episode 8)
2021-present	Gabby's Dollhouse	Gabby	Main role (also voice); 90 episodes
2024	Gabby & Friends	Gabby	Main role; five episodes
2026	Gabby's Dollhouse: Makers and Bakers Holiday	Gabby	Post-production
2026	Doozie's Doghouse	Gabby	Guest Appearance Episode 3
