= Gabby's Dollhouse: The Movie =

2025 DreamWorks Animation film

- Theatrical release poster
- Directed by: Ryan Crego
- Screenplay by: Mike Lew; Rehana Lew Mirza; Adam Wilson; Melanie Wilson LaBracio
- Story by: Ryan Crego
- Based on: Gabby's Dollhouse by: Traci Paige Johnson; Jennifer Twomey
- Produced by: Steven Schweickart
- Starring: Laila Lockhart Kraner; Jason Mantzoukas; Gloria Estefan; Kristen Wiig
- Cinematography: Todd Elyzen
- Edited by: Marcus Taylor
- Music by: Stephanie Economou
- Production company: DreamWorks Animation
- Distributed by: Universal Pictures
- Release dates: September 13, 2025 (Melbourne); September 26, 2025 (United States)
- Running time: 98 minutes
- Country: United States
- Language: English
- Budget: $32 million
- Box office: $80.8 million

Gabby's Dollhouse: The Movie (Note: Officially billed as DreamWorks Gabby's Dollhouse: The Movie) is a 2025 American musical fantasy comedy film based on the Netflix series Gabby's Dollhouse, which was created by Traci Paige Johnson and Jennifer Twomey, both of whom serve as executive producers. Produced by DreamWorks Animation, the live-action animated film was directed by Ryan Crego from a screenplay by the writing teams of Mike Lew and Rehana Lew Mirza, and Adam Wilson and Melanie Wilson LaBracio, based on a story conceived by Crego. Combining live-action and animation, it stars Laila Lockhart Kraner, who reprises her role from the series with Jason Mantzoukas, Gloria Estefan, and Kristen Wiig joining the cast. The film takes place between the eleventh and twelfth seasons of the series, It follows Gabby as she goes on a road trip with her grandmother to the urban wonderland of Cat Francisco and embarks on an adventure to save her dollhouse and the Gabby Cats from a cat lady.

DreamWorks Animation announced a feature-length film based on Gabby's Dollhouse in April 2024, with Crego and Steven Schweickart attached as director and producer, respectively. It was also announced that same month that Kraner set to reprise her role as Gabby. Filming began in July 2024 in Vancouver, British Columbia, with further casting running from February to May 2025. It is the second live-action DreamWorks Animation film, following the 2025 remake of How to Train Your Dragon (2010), as well as DreamWorks Animation's first live-action film that is not a remake.

Gabby's Dollhouse: The Movie premiered in Melbourne on September 13, 2025, and was released by Universal Pictures in the United States on September 26, 2025. The film received generally positive reviews from critics and grossed $80.8 million worldwide.

== Plot ==
Gabby is preparing to go on a road trip with her grandmother, Gigi, to Cat Francisco, bringing her stuffed sidekick, Pandy Paws, and the Gabby Cats: Cakey, MerCat, Kitty Fairy, Baby Box, Carlita, DJ Catnip, CatRat, and Pillow Cat, in her dollhouse to visit her home for a special project. Upon arrival, CatRat accidentally unlatches the dollhouse from the van, causing it to roll into a store where Vera, an old cat lady, takes it and drives home. Vera then splits the Gabby Cats up to different surroundings in her area. CatRat ends up in a drawer where he discovers a plush cat named Chumsley.

Gabby, determined to save her dollhouse, shrinks along with Pandy and is taken to Vera's home, where the dollhouse is. Gabby learns that the Gabby Cats are missing but meets Chumsley at the kitchen, while ordering CatRat to stay. Gabby and Pandy find MerCat in a fish tank and jump in, turning into mermaids. They free MerCat, traveling in a bubble, and find the Gabby Cats inside a bag. Vera opens the door, causing them to fly outside and fall into a nearby bush. They meet kitty gnomes who take them to see Kitty Fairy, their queen.

At the kitty gnomes' hideout, they trick the gnomes into playing a game of hide and seek while building a flying bird-like vehicle to escape. Kitty Fairy gives up her queen title, and she and MerCat return to the dollhouse. Meanwhile, Gabby and Pandy manage to rescue Cakey, Baby Box, and DJ Catnip as Vera is distracted by a trio of Kitty Rangers. They all return to the dollhouse, where Chumsley reveals in a flashback how Vera once played with him when she was a child but grew up and left him in her drawer. Gabby, Pandy, and the Gabby Cats are cast out, and Chumsley seals the windows, claiming ownership of the dollhouse. Carlita takes Pandy and DJ Catnip to get Gigi.

CatRat unlocks the door, and the team enters the dollhouse to stop Chumsley, who seizes Gabby’s cat ears before she can pinch them, corrupting the dollhouse. Baby Box gives the cat ears back to Gabby, but she tearfully tells her she is a bit scared of growing up. Baby Box comforts her, saying she and the other Gabby Cats will not give up on her. Pandy, DJ Catnip, and Carlita return with a smaller Gigi. Gabby reunites with her and shares what happened.

Chumsley attempts to bake a cake with a bunch of magic, accidentally creating a portal. Gabby becomes big again to get Vera, then they both shrink and meet Gigi and the Gabby Cats. They find the portal at the kitchen, which sucks Gabby, Vera, Cakey, and Chumsley into a land made of sweets.

Gabby, Vera, and Cakey see the trail of Chumsley's paw prints and ride animal-shaped cookies to catch up. Gummy worms erupt from the ground, carrying them away, and Chumsley escapes. The ground collapses, and they fall near a river, floating on a donut. As Vera talks about growing up, Cookie Bobby, a large cat made of candy, appears and throws them to safety, while Chumsley crosses a sweets-made rickety bridge. Before Vera can reconcile with Chumsley, he destroys the bridge.

The magic from the dollhouse begins to fade, causing the world to start collapsing. Vera and Chumsley save each other and reconcile, while everyone manages to return to the dollhouse. Its magic is restored, and a balloon shaped like a cat inflates from the dollhouse, lifting it as it flies over Cat Francisco. Back at Gigi's home, Gabby helps build the special project Gigi has been working on: a dog-themed dollhouse made for Gabby's sister. (Note: Gabby's sister, Doozie, debuted in season 14 of Gabby's Dollhouse.)

== Cast ==
=== Live-action ===
- Laila Lockhart Kraner as Gabby, a young girl who is a kitty enthusiast. Kraner also voices her animated counterpart.
  - Tina Ukwu as young Gabby
- Gloria Estefan as Grandma Gigi, the grandmother of Gabby who also made her Dollhouse and the Gabby Cats who live inside it. Estefan also voices her animated counterpart.
- Kristen Wiig as Vera, an eccentric cat lady. Wiig also voices her animated counterpart.
  - Gweneth Everlee as young Vera
  - Cassidy Nugent as teenage Vera
- Kate Widdington as Kitty Ranger #1
- Sophia Biling as Kitty Ranger #2
- Lauren Chan as Kitty Ranger #3

=== Voices ===
- Jason Mantzoukas as Chumsley, a neglected plush cat owned by Vera
- Logan Bailey as Pandy Paws, a kitty/giant panda Gabby Cat who is Gabby's sidekick and is mostly in plush form when Gabby is normal size
- Juliet Donenfeld as Cakey, a kitty/cupcake Gabby Cat
- Secunda Wood as MerCat, a kitty/mermaid Gabby Cat who can swim through the air
- Tara Strong as Kitty Fairy, a kitty/fairy Gabby Cat
- Maggie Lowe as Baby Box, a cardboard Gabby Cat
- Carla Tassara as Carlita, a kitty/car Gabby Cat
- Eduardo Franco as DJ Catnip, a Gabby Cat with extendable legs
- Donovan Patton as CatRat, a kitty/rat Gabby Cat
- Sainty Nelsen as Pillow Cat, a kitty/pillow Gabby Cat
- Fortune Feimster (US) / Vogue Williams (UK) as Kitty Fridge, the cat-themed refrigerator in the kitchen part of the Dollhouse
- Thomas Lennon as Matthew, a Kitty Gnome
- Melissa Villaseñor as Sunflower, a Kitty Gnome
- Ego Nwodim as Twiggy, a Kitty Gnome
- Kyle Mooney as an existential Kitty Gnome
- Matty Matheson as Cookie Bobby, a cat creature made of candy.
- Kailov Rene Quijada as Young Son
- Shelby Young as Crosswalk Voice
- Lucy Lowe as a Kitty Ranger heard on a Walkie Talkie
- Ayden Elijah as Chopper Topper, the "wild child" of the Toppers
- Juliet Peldon as Molly Topper, the adorable but feral Topper
- Luna Rothman as Bopper Topper, the more intelligent of the Toppers
- Shiloh Rothman as Hopper Topper, the daredevil of the Toppers
- Piotr Michael as GPS
- Scott Menville as a Hamster Kitty

== Crew ==
- Katie McWane - Voice Director

== Production ==
In April 2024, DreamWorks Animation announced a feature-length film based on the Netflix series Gabby's Dollhouse, titled Gabby's Dollhouse: The Movie, with Ryan Crego attached to direct and Steven Schweickart producing, while series creators Traci Paige Johnson and Jennifer Twomey would serve as executive producers. Laila Lockhart Kraner would also reprise her role as Gabby. In April 2025, during CinemaCon, Kristen Wiig and Gloria Estefan were announced to have joined the film. Logan Bailey, Eduardo Franco, Juliet Donenfeld, Donovan Patton, Sainty Nelsen, Maggie Lowe, Carla Tassara, Tara Strong and Secunda Wood were also announced to reprise their roles from the show. In May 2025, with the release of the trailer, it was announced that Ego Nwodim, Kyle Mooney, Melissa Villaseñor, Thomas Lennon, Jason Mantzoukas, and Fortune Feimster had joined the cast. Stephanie Economou composed the score.

Principal photography began on July 10, 2024, in Vancouver, British Columbia.

=== Animation and visual effects ===
CGCG, Image Engine, and Assemblage Entertainment provided the animation for the film, while FX3X provided the visual effects.

== Music ==
Gabby's Dollhouse: The Movie (Original Motion Picture Soundtrack)

Soundtrack album by Various artists
- Released: September 26, 2025
- Genre: Pop
- Length: 31:38
- Label: Republic
- Producers: DJ White Shadow; Joseph Shirley; Stephanie Economou; Nissan Zangilevitch; Nash Overstreet; Alex Geringas; Ryan Crego; P.T. Walkley; JP Rende; Avedon; Nightfeelings; IMLAY

Gabby's Dollhouse: The Movie (Original Motion Picture Soundtrack) is the soundtrack album for the film. Stephanie Economou composed the film's score, and the album includes original songs performed by Kraner, along with new tracks by Aespa and Lu Kala. The soundtrack was released by Republic Records on September 26, 2025, coinciding with the film's theatrical release.

Other songs featured in the film include: "Apt.", by Rosé and Bruno Mars; "Makeba", by Jain; "I Swear", by All-4-One; "Ice Cream", by Blackpink and Selena Gomez; "Super Graphic Ultra Modern Girl", by Chappell Roan; "Living My Best Life", by Jessie J; and "Sunroof", by Nicky Youre and Dazy.

=== Track listing ===
No.	Title	Writer(s)	Performer(s)	Length
1.	"Say Hello"	Anthony Pavel; Kali Janette Arnott; Paul Blair; Stefan Adam Litrownik	MAX	3:06
2.	"Gabby's Dollhouse World"	Elizabeth Pitchkhadze; Jordan Sweet	Gabby's Dollhouse	3:10
3.	"Pinching In"	Jennifer Twomey; P.T. Walkley	Gabby's Dollhouse	1:02
4.	"Kaleidoscope"	Joseph Chase Atkins	Gabby's Dollhouse	2:33
5.	"Skibidi Meow"	Alex Geringas; Ryan Crego	Gabby's Dollhouse; Ryan Crego	1:18
6.	"Cat Party"	Alex Geringas; Ryan Crego	BOBBLYS	2:34
7.	"Sweet Cream"	Claire Morrissey; Joseph Chase Atkins	Gabby's Dollhouse	1:28
8.	"Let's Go for a Ride"	P.T. Walkley	Gabby's Dollhouse	2:28
9.	"Every Day Is a Party"	Chloe Angelides; Jesse Saint John; Nicholas Weiss; P.T. Walkley; Vincent van den Ende	Lu Kala	2:58
10.	"Dollhouse World"	Elizabeth Pitchkhadze; Jordan Sweet	Aespa	3:11
11.	"Gabby's Dollhouse: The Movie Score Suite"	Stephanie Economou	Stephanie Economou	6:19
12.	"Pretty Glitter Kitty Litter - Bonus Track"	Alex Geringas; Ryan Crego	Gabby's Dollhouse; Alex Geringas; Ryan Crego	1:26
Total length:				31:38

== Release ==
Gabby's Dollhouse: The Movie had its premiere in Melbourne on September 13, 2025, and was released in the United States on September 26, by Universal Pictures.

=== Home media ===
Gabby's Dollhouse: The Movie was released on digital on October 14, 2025, and on Blu-ray and DVD on November 25, 2025, by Universal Pictures Home Entertainment.

== Reception ==
=== Box office ===
Gabby's Dollhouse: The Movie has grossed $32 million in the United States and Canada and $48.8 million internationally, for a total of $80.8 million.

In the United States and Canada, Gabby's Dollhouse: The Movie was released alongside One Battle After Another and The Strangers – Chapter 2, and was projected to gross $12–15 million from 3,500 theaters in its opening weekend. It opened with $13.7 million and finished second behind One Battle After Another. In the United Kingdom and Ireland, the film opened with approximately £1.7 million (US$2.1 million) from 606 locations, topping the local box office during its opening weekend.

=== Critical response ===
On the review aggregator website Rotten Tomatoes, 85% of 27 critics' reviews are positive, with an average rating of 6.3/10. Metacritic, which uses a weighted average, assigned the film a score of 46 out of 100, based on four critics, indicating "mixed or average" reviews. Audiences polled by CinemaScore gave the film a rare average grade of "A+" on an A+ to F scale, becoming the first DreamWorks Animation film to receive this grade.

Weiting Liu of Common Sense Media rated the film three out of five stars, writing: "This energetic live-action movie delivers exactly what fans of a popular TV series would expect: a lively blend of animation and sing-alongs overflowing with irresistibly cute kitty characters." In a positive review, Frank Scheck of The Hollywood Reporter wrote: "If you happen to have some tykes that need big-screen babysitting, well, they'll probably have a swell time... [But] other than the presence of Kristen Wiig, there's precious little on offer for anyone who doesn't drink beverages from a sippy cup." Owen Gleiberman of Variety gave the film a positive review and wrote: "A genial throwaway that skitters through incidents with a G-rated innocuousness that makes it perfect for a very pint-sized demo." J. Kelly Nestruck of Globe and Mail wrote: "The big-screen spinoff is, surprisingly, quite charming, borrowing themes from the Toy Story franchise to explore the fear of growing up and that you may lose your ability to play and imagine along the way." Bob Strauss of the San Francisco Chronicle rated the film three stars out of four, writing: "Songs and jokes and a surprisingly psychedelic sensibility make for a safe, kooky and sometimes even adult-amusing good time."

Sandra Hall of The Sydney Morning Herald gave the film two stars out five, writing: "I can understand the film's appeal for young children... But if you're over 10, its relentlessly upbeat tone makes you feel as if you're being beaten over the head with a toy catalogue." Natalie Winkelman of The New York Times gave the film a negative review writing that "Gabby's Dollhouse is strictly not suitable for anyone over reading age. If parents want to stay awake through the drivel, I'd suggest bringing a book."
