= Gabby's Dollhouse =

American live-action/animated children's television series

- Promotional poster featuring Gabby and the Gabby Cats
- Genre: Preschool; Adventure; Fantasy
- Created by: Traci Paige Johnson; Jennifer Twomey
- Presented by: Laila Lockhart Kraner; Celestina Harris
- Voices of: Tucker Chandler; Logan Bailey; Sebastian Billingsley-Rodriguez; Darren Criss; Juliet Donenfeld; Eduardo Franco; Sainty Nelsen; Maggie Lowe; Tara Strong; Donovan Patton; Carla Tassara; Secunda Wood
- Opening theme: "Hey Gabby!" by PT Walkley
- Composer: PT Walkley
- Country of origin: United States
- Original language: English
- No. of seasons: 14
- No. of episodes: 90 (list of episodes)

Production
- Executive producers: Traci Paige Johnson; Jennifer Twomey
- Running time: 25 minutes
- Production company: DreamWorks Animation Television

Original release
- Network: Netflix
- Release: January 5, 2021 – present

Gabby's Dollhouse is an American interactive television series created by Blue's Clues veterans Traci Paige Johnson and Jennifer Twomey for Netflix and produced by DreamWorks Animation Television. The series first premiered on Netflix on January 5, 2021. Combining live-action and animation, Gabby (voiced and portrayed by Laila Lockhart Kraner) and her cat friends (called the Gabby Cats) go on adventures inside the dollhouse.

A film based on the series, titled Gabby's Dollhouse: The Movie, was announced in April 2024 by DreamWorks Animation, and was released on September 26, 2025, by Universal Pictures. Most of the cast from the show reprised their roles for the film. A spin-off called Doozie's Doghouse has been announced. It premiered on November 9, 2026.

== Premise ==
Each episode begins with the live-action Gabby playing in her bedroom. She then unboxes a miniature package received in the Dollhouse Delivery brought to her Meow-Meow Mailbox that is the catalyst for an adventure inside the animated world of her dollhouse. Gabby puts on her cat ears headband and shrinks down with her stuffed toy Pandy Paws who comes alive to surprise Gabby with a "hug attack". Common rituals may involve an encounter with CatRat, who often randomly appears in one of the rooms in the dollhouse.

At the end of each episode is a "Gabby Cat of the Day" segment where one of the Gabby Cats is selected to guide the viewer one-on-one in crafting, cooking, singing, or other activities with a few episodes having Gabby in the selection. Then it goes back to live-action Gabby who closes out the episode.

== Characters ==
=== Main ===
- Gabby (portrayed in live-action and voiced by Laila Lockhart Kraner) is the show's host. She is a cat enthusiast and has a magical cat headband which is able to shrink her down to animated toy-size (by singing the incantation "A pinch on my left / Pinch pinch on my right / Grab Pandy's hand and hold on tight"). Gabby's cat headband can also do other tricks like change the color of her wavy hair and activating the "Gabby Cat of the Day" segment.
- Pandy Paws (voiced by Tucker Chandler from S1–"Grandma CatRat", Logan Bailey starting with "Mermaid Christmas Cruise"–present) is a kitty/panda Gabby Cat who is Gabby's sidekick and best friend. He starts off as a stuffed toy that Gabby would throw her voice off of during interactions, but comes to life when he and Gabby shrink into the dollhouse as he explains in the first episode. Pandy Paws likes ambushing Gabby with "hug attacks" upon them entering the dollhouse and carries a magenta-colored Pandy Pack that he uses to hold different items.
- Doozie (portrayed in live-action and voiced by Celestina Harris) is Gabby's younger sister who debuts in the fourteenth season. She is first mentioned by Grandma Gigi near the end of Gabby's Dollhouse: The Movie as she has built a dog-shaped dollhouse for her to play with. While Gabby is into cats, Doozie is into dogs.
- Puggie Paws (voiced by Sebastian Billingsley-Rodriguez) is a puggle who is Doozie's sidekick. Like Pandy Paws, he starts off as a stuffed toy and comes to life when Doozie and Puggie shrink into the dollhouse.

=== Gabby Cats ===
- Carlita (voiced by Carla Tassara) is a purple and teal kitty/car Gabby Cat. She drives around the dollhouse and likes playing games in the playroom while serving as a mode of transportation for the other characters. In episodes where the Dollhouse is in its Dollhouse Hotel form, Carlita operates as a bellhop.
- Cakey (voiced by Juliet Donenfeld) is a small white kitty/cupcake Gabby Cat and makes sweet treats and snacks in the kitchen. He is able to create sprinkles (by doing either of the following: when he is sad and cries or when he is excited, he spins around and yells "Sprinkle party!").
- Daniel James "DJ" Catnip (voiced by Eduardo Franco) is a lavender kitty/disc jockey Gabby Cat who wears a reddish-pink glittery hoodie which is able to stretch his tail and legs in addition to mainly using them to play instruments. He operates in the music room and sometimes wears a visor over his eyes. In episodes where the Dollhouse is in its Dollhouse Hotel form, DJ Catnip operates as the hotel manager.
- CatRat (voiced by Donovan Patton) is a blue sneaky kitty/rat Gabby Cat with dark blue and light blue markings who pops up in every room. He likes everything shiny and sometimes plays the role of a villain in certain episodes.
- Pillow Cat (voiced by Sainty Nelsen) is a multicolored kitty/pillow Gabby Cat. She likes making stories and she's usually seen sleeping in the bedroom. Her catchphrases are "That's how I roll!" and "Let's roll with it."
- Kitty Fairy (voiced by Tara Strong) is a pink kitty/fairy Gabby Cat with clear, pink and green wings, a pair of wishberry blossom-like antennae, a green flower-like dress and a flower crown. She makes garden magic with her tail or her watering can as she manages the Fairytail Garden.
- MerCat (voiced by Secunda Wood) is a turquoise kitty/mermaid Gabby Cat. She makes science "spa-themed" in the bathroom and can also swim in the air to get around. In episodes where the Dollhouse is in its Dollhouse Hotel form, MerCat runs the bathroom as a hotel spa.
- The Box Cat Family is a family of Gabby Cats who are made of cardboard that reside in the craft room.
  - Baby Box (voiced by Maggie Lowe) is a young pink/peach Gabby Cat. She likes making crafts and is the daughter of Mama Box Cat. She does sometimes say "Whoopsies!" (which would later become a song featured in the soundtrack for the series).
  - Mama Box (voiced by Tara Strong) is a fuchsia/peach Gabby Cat who is the mother of Baby Box.
  - The Box Brothers (all voiced by Jude Schwartz) are the brothers of Baby Box and sons of Mama Box.
    - Benny Box is Baby Box's baby brother who first appeared in season 8. He made a return in season 9. Benny Box's voice actor/actress was not listed in the end credits.
- Marty the Party Cat (voiced by Darren Criss) is an orange and pink Gabby Cat who resides in the Party Room somewhere in the attic. He debuted in season ten where he describes himself as being "part-cat and all-party".

=== Doozie Dogs ===
- CreamPup (voiced by Aaliyah Butler) is a dog/ice cream cone Doozie Dog and a counterpart of Cakey.
- Seaquin (voiced by Kimiko Glenn) is a dog/mermaid Doozie Dog and a counterpart of MerCat.
- DreamPup (voiced by Kari Wahlgren) is a Doozie Dog and a counterpart of Pillow Cat.
- PixiePup (voiced by Blake Kennedy) is a dog/pixie Doozie Dog and a counterpart of Kitty Fairy.
- BoxPup (voiced by Arthur Waite) is a Doozie Dog made of cardboard and a counterpart of Baby Box.
- GamePup (voiced by Alan Trinca) is a dog/game controller Doozie Dog and a counterpart of Carlita.
- Crouton Bredington (voiced by Donovan Patton) is a dog/bread Doozie Dog and a counterpart of CatRat.
- Swaggy (voiced by Darius Marquis Johnson) is a Doozie Dog and a counterpart of DJ Catnip.

=== Supporting ===
- Floyd (portrayed by a female cat named Amelia) is Gabby's live-action tabby cat who makes his only appearance in the live-action sequences and rarely interacts with the Gabby Cats. In the show, Floyd is always referred to as a male.
- The Cat-A-Vator (vocal effects provided by Traci Paige Johnson in season 10) is a sentient and silent cat-themed elevator in the dollhouse that takes Gabby and the Gabby Cats to any of the floors in the dollhouse. By season 10, she starts making audible sounds, she is the first robot Gabby Cat in the show.
- Cupcake Cousins (voiced by Henry Witcher, Archibald Englehardt, Mia Lynn Bangunan, and Amari McCoy) are Cakey's four younger cousins who appeared in the episode "Cakey's Cupcake Cousins". Their names are Bakey, Flakey, Marshapan, and Paddycake. As such, the colors are by the following order: Bakey is pink, Flakey is blue, Marshapan is green, and Paddycake is yellow. Flakey and Marshapan are male, and Bakey and Paddycake are female. The Cupcake Cousins return to appear starting with "Baby Box's Meow-Seum Day."

=== Other ===
- Pete (Voiced by Eric Lopez) is a polar bear who appears in the episode of the same name where he came to Gabby in the Dollhouse Delivery encased in a block of ice until MerCat used spa salts to free him. He is a friend of Gabby and the Gabby Cats, where they gave him his first beach experience. In the episode "Snow Cruise," Gabby and Pandy visit him in the Arctic. He returns occasionally, starting with the episode "Carlita's Ameowzing Race."
- Fluffy Flufferton (Voiced by Elena Murray) is a feline pop music star who appears in the episode of the same name in season 4. She returns in "CatRat's Birthday Surprise" for season 10.
- Luli-Loo (Voiced by Halle Hrzich) is a young blue fairy Gabby Cat who appears in the episode "The Fairy Festival." She returns, starting with "True Fairy Friends."
- Bitty Fairy (Voiced by Thomas Bushell) is a small male black Fairy Fly with multicolored spots, who first appeared in "True Fairy Friends."
- DJ Comet (Voiced by Reggie Watkins) is a light green Gabby Cat who is DJ Catnip's alien cousin who appeared in "Mission to CATurn". He, like DJ Catnip, is able to stretch his tail and legs but also spin them around like a helicopter. He returns in the episode "Dollhouse Dress-Up Chest" and "Baby Box's Crafty-riffic Adventure."
- Figgy (Voiced by Rachel Ling Gordon) is a pink Christmas elf like Gabby Cat, who appears in the episode "A CAT-Tabulous Christmas. She looks a lot like what Fluffy Flufferton used to, but pink.
- Kico (Vocal effects provided by Juliet Donenfeld) is a young female kitty/unicorn hybrid who appears in the episode of the same name.
- Santa Kitty (Voiced by Darrell Brown) is an orange Gabby Cat who is the cat version of Santa Claus.
- Candy Cane (Vocal effects provided by Aria Surrec) is a red reindeer/kitty who leads Santa Kitty's sleigh.
- The Hamster Kitties (Vocal effects provided by Maggie Lowe and Juliet Donenfeld) are tiny cat/hamster hybrids who occasionally appear in the series.
- The Dust Bunnies are cute small bunnies made of dust.
- The Doodads are three Gabby Cats made of cardboard and other crafty things who are the rivals of Gabby, Pandy, and Carlita during the Meow-Mazing Games.
- Spongey-Saurus (Voiced by Kailen Jude) is a green dinosaur who appears in the episode of the same name.
- Sunny Cat (Voiced by Brittney Johnson) is MerCat's sister who first appeared in season 8.
- Kitty Narwhal (Voiced by Traci Paige Johnson) is a minor character who is one of MerCat's sea creature friends. She appears in the episode "The Mermaid Cruise Ship".
- Kitty Squiddy (Voiced by PT Walkley) is a blue and purple cat/squid hybrid who appears in the episode "The Magical Mermaid-Lantis" as the main antagonist. He stole the three gems that activate the rainbow, and he believed that he didn't have a sparkle like anyone else, but he eventually found his special sparkle by dancing.
- Kittyfish - The half-kitty/half-fish creature who are pets of CatRat. They have meaningful names.
  - Zeke (Vocal effects provided by Maggie Lowe) is one of CatRat's Kittyfish who is a fan of hide-and-seek.
  - Munchy (Vocal effects provided by Maggie Lowe) is one of CatRat's Kittyfish who eats crunchy foods.
  - Dot (Vocal effects provided by Juliet Donenfeld) is one of CatRat's Kittyfish who likes putting dots all over paintings. She is the only Kittyfish who is a female.
  - Disco (Vocal effects provided by Juliet Donenfeld) is one of CatRat's Kittyfish who is a fan of dance moves.
- Hsiu Hsiu (Voiced by Aria Surrec) is MerCat and Sunny Cat's younger sister, who first appeared in the Gabby's Dollhouse Holiday Special of 2023. She returns starting with season 10.
- The Silly Bad Guys (All voiced by PT Walkley) are the bad guys that CatRat invented in the episode "Baby Box's Crafty-riffic Adventure". They even had their own musical number called "Silly Bad Guys" in the series. Each of the bad guys has specialties:
  - Sneaky Spoon is one of the Silly Bad Guys who likes being sneaky and making messes.
  - Horrible Hose is one of the Silly Bad Guys who likes flooding areas. Horrible Hose flooded Kitty Fairy's Fairy Tail Garden in "Baby Box's Crafty-riffic Adventure."
  - Tricky Trumpet is one of the Silly Bad Guys who blows DJ Catnip's banjo all the way to space.
  - Hungry Dragon is one of the Silly Bad Guys made out of paper cups as seen in Paper Cup Poppers.
  - Dizzy the Doughnut is one of the Silly Bad Guys who is mentioned in the song, "Silly Bad Guys."
- Grandma CatRat (Voiced by Barbara Dirickson) is CatRat's grandmother who appeared in the episode of the same name. She loves playing games, eating ice cream, and taking spa baths. She had known her grandson since he was a baby kitten. Grandma used to be orange in color until CatRat put polka dot potion in her spa bath, making her all polka-dotted.

== Episodes ==
Season	Episodes	Originally released	
Season	Episodes	First released	Last released
1	10	January 5, 2021	
2	8	August 10, 2021	
3	7	October 19, 2021	
4	8	February 1, 2022	
5	6	July 25, 2022	
6	6	November 1, 2022	
7	6	March 20, 2023	
8	7	August 7, 2023	November 6, 2023
9	6	March 25, 2024	
10	6	August 5, 2024	
11	6	February 17, 2025	
12	5	November 17, 2025	
13	5	March 2, 2026	
14	4	September 14, 2026	

The first episode was released as a sneak peek on YouTube on August 22, 2020, while the series itself was released on January 5, 2021. The second season premiered on August 10, 2021, while the third season premiered on October 19, 2021. The fourth season premiered on February 1, 2022, the fifth season premiered on July 25, 2022, the sixth season premiered on November 1, 2022, the seventh season premiered on March 20, 2023, and the eighth season premiered on August 7, 2023. "The Mermaid Christmas Cruise" aired on November 6, 2023, as part of Season 8. The ninth season premiered on March 25, 2024. The tenth season premiered on August 5, 2024. The eleventh season premiered on February 17, 2025. The twelfth season premiered on November 17, 2025. The thirteenth season premiered on March 2, 2026. The fourteenth season premiered on September 14, 2026.

== Production and development ==
The show was announced in 2019, and released early in the COVID-19 pandemic. It was the first DreamWorks property where the creators were based in New York City instead of Los Angeles, and the whole production team, including the creators, were connected via videoconferencing, also a first for a DreamWorks production.

The basic themes of the show — dollhouses, miniatures, and cats — were creators Johnson and Twomey's favorites, while the concept of the "dollhouse deliveries" was inspired by unboxing videos, although tweaked so that instead of "unboxing a product", they "unbox a story". Initially, cats were not the main theme of the show — for example, the character of DJ Catnip was originally supposed to be a clock — but this was changed based on the trend of cat videos.

Early in the show's production, the creators came across Carol Dweck's book The Growth Mindset, which led to the production team adopting the idea of celebrating mistakes and "failing fantastically", which is promoted on the show.

The soundtrack of the show includes genres not often found in children's shows, such as disco/pop (the genre used for DJ Catnip's theme song "The Music In You"), which is due to the creators not liking "saccharine-y sweet music".

Animation production for the show was provided by Technicolor Animation Productions (later Mikros Animation) (seasons 1–4 only), Dave Enterprises, CGCG, Doberman Pictures, Saffronic, Inc. (starting with "The Mermaid Christmas Cruise") and Gabby Gabby Hey Productions, Ltd. with live action provided by One-Take Floyd.

Ahead of the fourteenth season, Celestina Harris was cast as Gabby's sister Doozie.

== Broadcast ==
The show made its linear debut on Cartoonito in Latin America on April 18, 2022, on Treehouse TV in Canada on October 15, 2022, and on Tiny Pop in the United Kingdom on October 17, 2022. The show made its American linear premiere on the Nick Jr. Channel on May 1, 2023, and Nickelodeon on June 5, 2023. Gabby's Dollhouse was removed from Nickelodeon on June 8, 2023. The show airs in the Philippines on TV5, where it is dubbed in Tagalog. The Japanese-dubbed Gabby's Dollhouse airs on TV Tokyo in Japan.

In Poland, the series made its debut on linear TV on MiniMini+ on December 20, 2021.

Gabby's Dollhouse also aired on Pop Max in the UK in 2024.

Gabby's Dollhouse also aired on Nick Jr. in the UK on July 22, 2024.

== Reception ==
The show was nominated for a Kidscreen award in 2021 and released a series of show-themed toys for the 2021 holiday season. The episode "Cakey's Cupcake Cousins" was nominated for Best Animated Television/Broadcast Production for Preschool Children at the 50th Annie Awards.

== Other media ==
=== Film ===
On April 25, 2024, Universal Pictures and DreamWorks Animation announced a feature-length film based on Gabby's Dollhouse, titled Gabby's Dollhouse: The Movie, released on September 26, 2025, with Ryan Crego attached to direct and Steven Schweickart producing, while Traci Paige Johnson and Jennifer Twomey would serve as executive producers. The film is the studio's first live action hybrid. In the film, Gabby goes on a road trip to Cat Francisco with her grandmother Gigi (portrayed by Gloria Estefan), but when the dollhouse ends up in the possession of a cat lady named Vera (portrayed by Kristen Wiig), Gabby must set off on an adventure through the real world to save the dollhouse and the Gabby Cats.

=== Spin-off ===
In early 2026, DreamWorks filed trademark applications related to a potential Doozie's Doghouse series. On September 24, 2026, the spin-off was announced which will feature Doozie and her Doozie Dogs as they play in their dollhouse and have playdates with Gabby and the Gabby Cats.

=== Miscellaneous ===
In 2024, the Macy's Thanksgiving Day Parade revealed a parade balloon of Gabby's animated form with Pandy Paws.

A video game titled DreamWorks Gabby's Dollhouse: Ready to Party was released on September 18, 2025.

=== Theme park attraction ===
Universal Kids Resort includes a themed land based on the Gabby's Dollhouse franchise.

=== Lego ===
Lego Gabby's Dollhouse
- Subject: Gabby's Dollhouse
- Licensed from: DreamWorks Animation Television and Universal Pictures
- Availability: August 1, 2023–present
- Total sets: 4 sets
- Characters: Gabby, Cakey Cat, Kitty Fairy, MerCat and Pandy Paws
- Official website

Lego Gabby's Dollhouse (stylized as LEGO Gabby's Dollhouse) is a Lego theme based on Gabby's Dollhouse. It is licensed from DreamWorks Animation Television and Netflix. The theme was first introduced in 2023.

The product line focuses on brave and courageous Gabby and her cat team called the “Gabby Cats” protect her dollhouse to keep its secret safe. Lego Gabby's Dollhouse aimed to recreate the main characters in Lego form, including Gabby, Cakey Cat, Kitty Fairy, MerCat and Pandy Paws.

The Lego construction toy range was based on the DreamWorks Animation preschool series and developed in collaboration with Universal Products & Experiences (formerly known as Universal Brand Development). The construction sets were designed to recreate the story and characters of the DreamWorks Animation preschool series in Lego form.

Lego Gabby's Dollhouse theme was launched on August 1, 2023. The Lego Group partnered with DreamWorks Animation Television and Netflix. As part of the marketing campaign, The Lego Group released four sets based on Gabby's Dollhouse TV series. Each set features a dollhouse, garden party, boat and spa salon. Minidoll figures of Gabby along with Cakey Cat, Kitty Fairy, MerCat and Pandy Paws figures were released as well. The sets were designed primarily for children with an age rating of 4+ or above.

Lego characters are:

- Gabby Martinez: She is a 12-year-old girl who is the show's trained dollhouse protector and the leader of the Gabby Cat team. She has a super gadget called the cat headband which is able to shrink her down to toy-size so she and her team protects the dollhouse to keep its secret safe and make sure all the cats who live there are safe.
- Pandy Paws: He is a black and white Gabby Cat who is half-kitty/half-panda, and Gabby's sidekick and best friend. He starts off as a stuffed toy, but comes to life when he and Gabby shrink. He likes ambushing Gabby with "hug attacks".
- Cakey: He is a small white Gabby Cat who is half-kitty/half-cupcake and makes sweet treats and snacks and a member of Gabby’s team. He is able to create sprinkles, by either criticizing his actions or spinning around while being excited. He has four little cousins named Bakey, Flakey, Marshapan, and Paddycake.
- Kitty Fairy: She is a pink half-kitty/half-fairy Gabby Cat who is a member of Gabby’s team with clear, pink and green wings, a pair of wishberry blossom-like antennae, a green flower-like dress and a flower crown. She makes garden magic with her tail, or her watering can.
- MerCat: She is a turquoise Gabby Cat who is half-kitty/half-mermaid who is a member of Gabby’s team. She makes science "spa-themed".

The four Lego sets being released in 2023 were Bakey with Cakey Fun (set number: 10785), Gabby & MerCat's Ship & Spa (set number: 10786), Kitty Fairy's Garden Party (set number: 10787) and Gabby's Dollhouse (set number: 10788).

According to BrickLink, The Lego Group released a total of 4 Lego sets as part of Lego Gabby's Dollhouse theme:

- Bakey with Cakey Fun: Bakey with Cakey Fun (set number: 10785) consists of 58 pieces, mini-doll figure of Gabby and Cakey figure. A buildable small kitchen included a mixing bowl, ingredients and a giant cupcake.
- Gabby & MerCat’s Ship & Spa: Gabby & MerCat's Ship & Spa (set number: 10786) consists of 88 pieces, mini-doll figure of Gabby and MerCat figure. Buildable boat and spa salon included a variety of accessories.
- Kitty Fairy’s Garden Party: Kitty Fairy's Garden Party (set number: 10787) consists of 130 pieces, mini-doll figure of Gabby along with Pandy Paws and Kitty Fairy figures. A buildable treehouse with a bed, snacks and a garden with a playground (slide, swing and merry-go-round).
- Gabby's Dollhouse (set number: 10788) consists of 498 pieces, mini-doll figure of Gabby along with Pandy Paws, MerCat and Cakey figures. The Dollhouse included eight colourful rooms with a sliding cat-a-vator and a variety of accessories.

The product line was accompanied by a series of animated short films that was released on YouTube: Introducing Gabby’s Dollhouse! was an official web short was released on YouTube on 1 May 2023 that inspired by both Gabby's Dollhouse (set number: 10788) as well as the Gabby's Dollhouse TV series.
