= Devil Whale =

Legendary demonic whale-like sea-monster

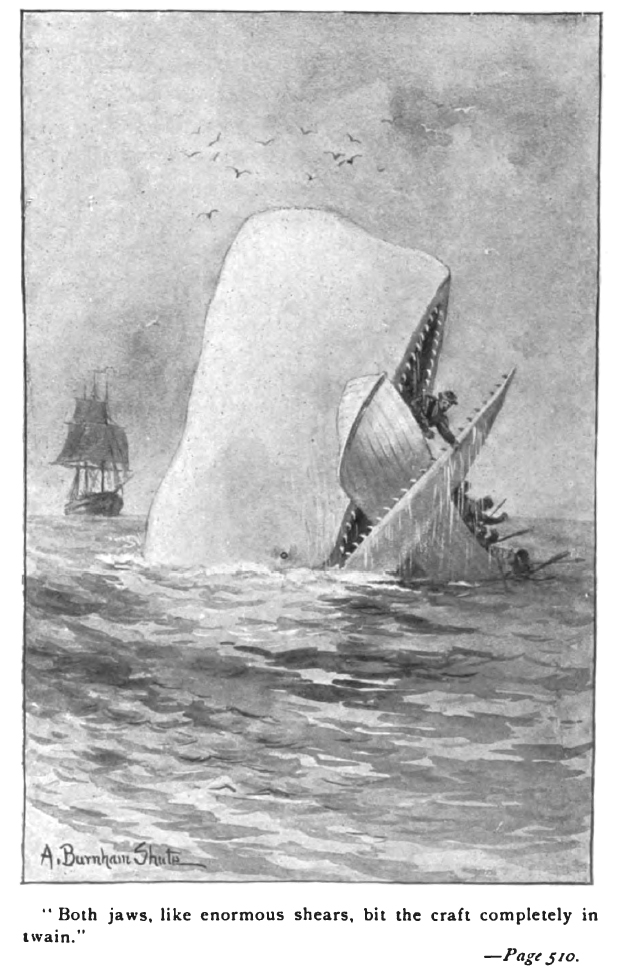

Origin
- Country: Ireland
- Region: Atlantic Ocean

The Devil Whale is a legendary demonic whale-like sea-monster (or a sea-turtle in some legends). According to myths, this whale is of enormous size and could swallow entire ships. It also resembles an island when it's sleeping, and unsuspecting sailors put ashore on its back. When the sailors start a fire, the Devil Whale awakes and attacks the ship, dragging it to the bottom of the sea. Because of this, Christianity began associating the whale with the Devil. This story is found in Sindbad the Sailor.

== History ==
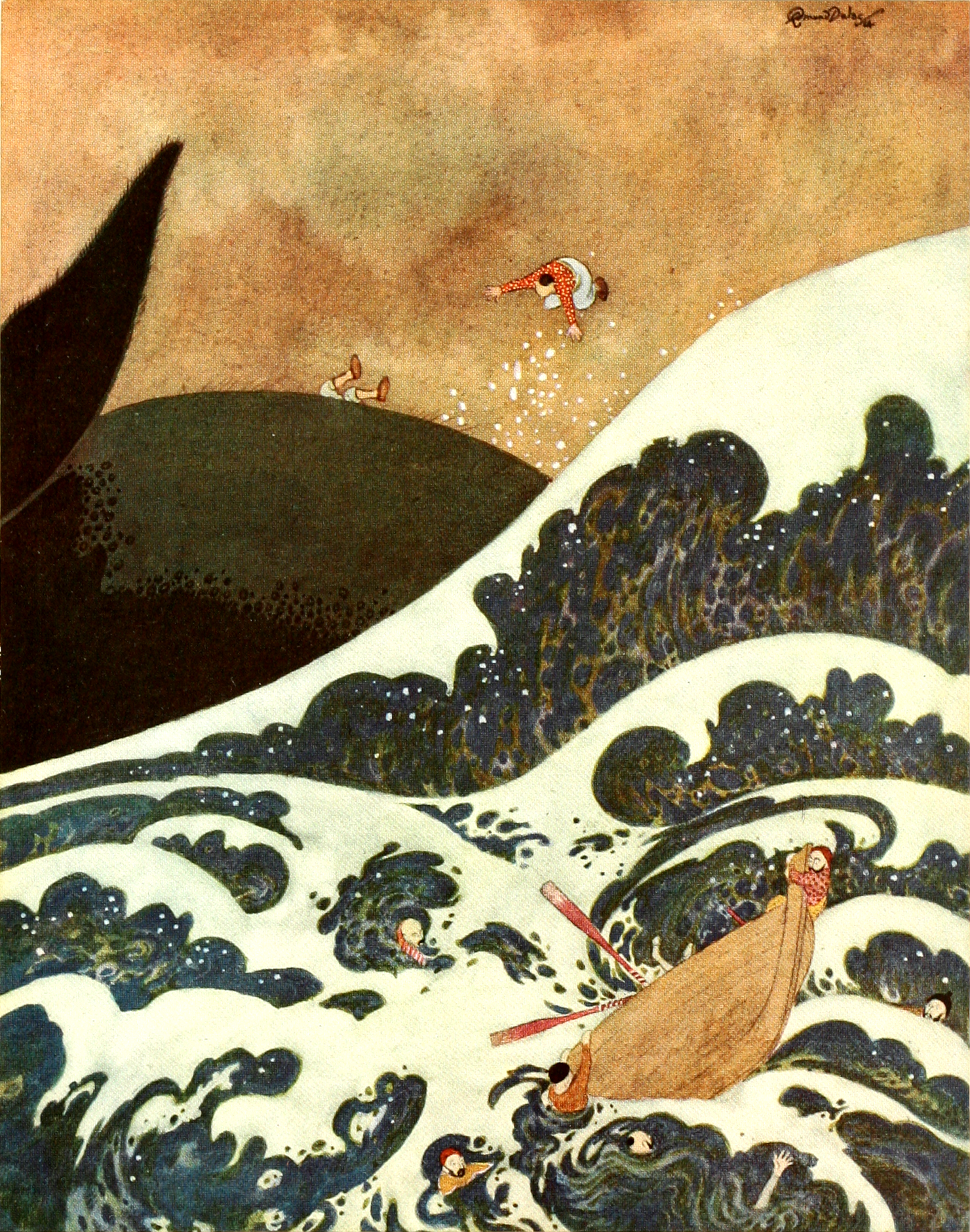
The whale island in the tale of Sindbad.

The incident of the whale island on Sindbad's First Voyage, from Baghdad and Basra, may be compared with whales described by "Pliny (23 AD–79 AD) and Solinus, covering four jugera, and the pristis sea-monster of the same authorities, 200 cubits long; Al Kazwini tells a similar tale of a colossal tortoise. Such Eastern stories are probably the original of the whale-island in the Irish travel-romance of St Brandan". Early explorer Saint Brendan the Navigator (c. AD 484 – c. 577), in his travels, reportedly landed on the back of a gigantic whale on Easter Sunday, mistaking it for an island. Soon as his monks started a fire to cook their meal, the "island" began to swim away and the sailors quickly scrambled back to their boats.

Guillaume le Clerc [13th century AD] has this to say:

But there is one monster, very treacherous and dangerous. In Latin, its name is Cetus. It is a bad neighbour for sailors. The upper part of its back looks like sand, and when it rises from the sea, the mariners think it is an island. Deceived by its size they sail toward it for refuge, when the storm comes upon them. They cast anchor, disembark upon the back of the whale, cook their food, build a fire, and in order to fasten their boat they drive great stakes into what seems to them to be sand. When the monster feels the heat of the fire which burns upon its back, it plunges down into the depths of the sea, and drags the ship and all the people after it. (Bestiaire)

Many modern legends behind this giant whale were inspired by the sinking of the real-life American whaleship known as the Essex that was sunk by a giant sperm whale in 1820. The story of this encounter with the giant whale as well as the crew's story of their reported experiences on a deserted island as a result of it gained international attention and inspired many depictions of the sperm whale in literature and later in film.

== In popular culture ==
In 1940 Walt Disney's Pinocchio, the giant sperm whale Monstro has many characteristics resembling that of the Devil Whale.

In Herman Melville's novel Moby-Dick (1851) about the hunting of a whale there are allusions to both the Devil Whale, and the biblical Leviathan.

The Devil Whale name was used to describe the California grey whale by Japanese whalers. In 1908, a Japanese whaler related stories about hunting grey whales, which he referred to as "Kukekua Kugira" (Devil Whale) due to the difficulty and danger in hunting it.

A Devil Whale was mentioned at the end of Ruby Gillman, Teenage Kraken.

== See also ==
- The Terrible Dogfish
- Sperm whale
- List of individual cetaceans
