= Stephanie Economou =

American composer

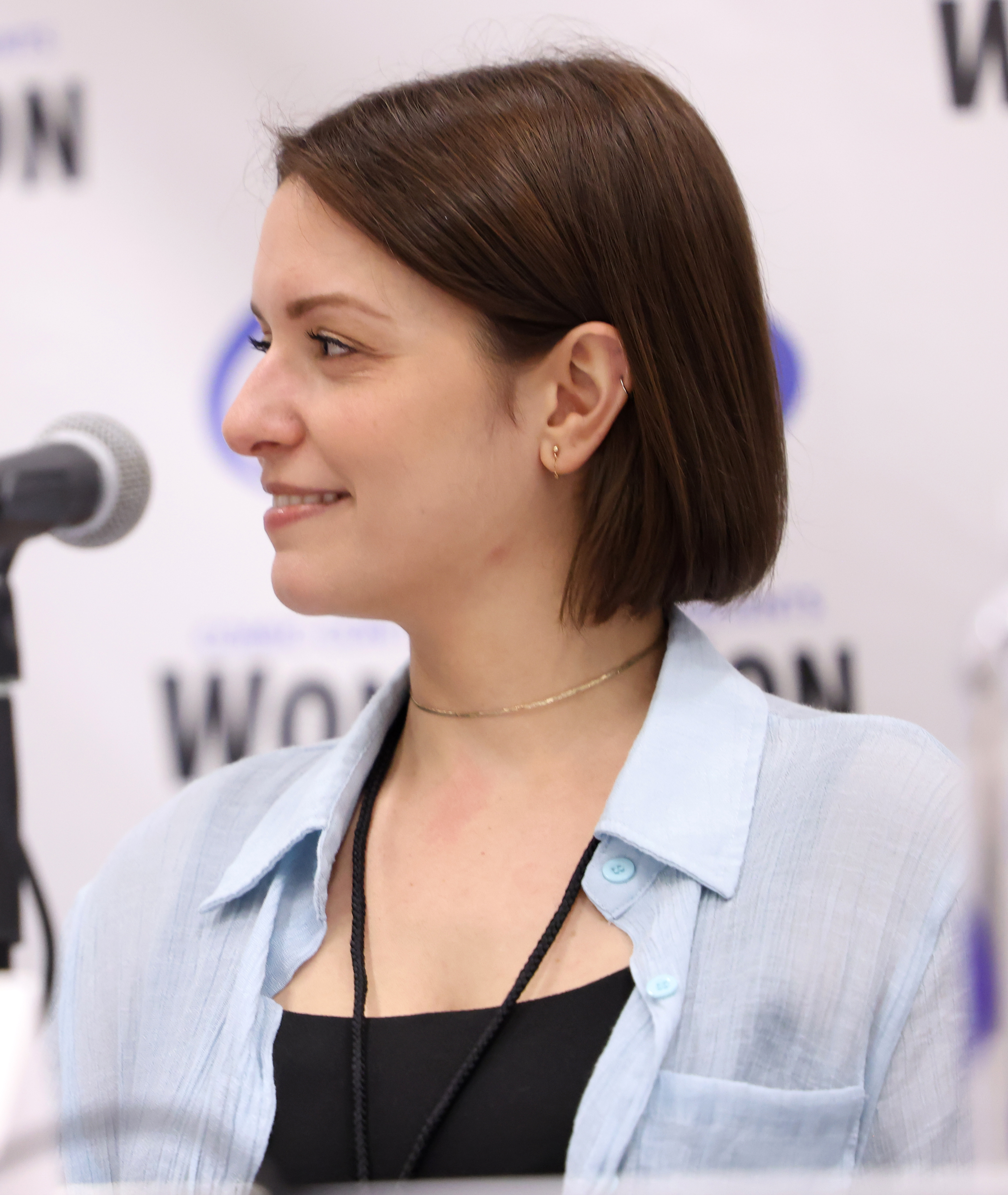
- Economou at the 2026 WonderCon

Background information
- Genres: Film and television scores, video game scores, jazz, rock, electronic, experimental, new age
- Occupations: Composer, conductor, multi-instrumentalist
- Instruments: Vocals, piano, keyboards, synthesizer, guitar, violin, viola
- Years active: 2011–present
- Website: https://www.stephanieeconomou.com

Stephanie Economou is an American composer, conductor, and multi-instrumentalist based in Los Angeles. Her score for Assassin's Creed Valhalla: Dawn of Ragnarok won the first Grammy Award for Best Score Soundtrack for Video Games and Other Interactive Media at the 65th annual ceremony.

== Early life and education ==
Economou grew up in Long Island, where she was involved in music programs at public school. She was inspired by her older sister Nicole to begin playing music, and chose the violin. Economou and her sister also grew up playing the Sega Genesis and games on the first generation of Xbox.

Economou attended the New England Conservatory of Music, where she studied composition. During her studies, she began to work with people studying at Emerson College to score music for their films.

During her master's degree for composition for visual media at UCLA, she had an apprenticeship with Harry Gregson-Williams, who employed her following her graduation.

== Career ==
=== Video games ===
Ubisoft approached Economou and employed her to initially work on Assassin's Creed Valhalla: The Siege of Paris. She cited the work of Sarah Schachner, who wrote the music for the main game, as influential on her scores for the expansions, as well as music by black metal bands Wilderun and Ari Mason. Economou composed the soundtrack to the Dawn of Ragnarök expansion of Assassin's Creed Valhalla. The album for this soundtrack won the first ever Grammy award given to a game soundtrack. Economou was the only woman nominated in her category.

=== Films ===
Economou's film credits include scores to the films About My Father, Ruby Gillman, Teenage Kraken, and My Big Fat Greek Wedding 3 among others.

=== TV Shows ===
In 2026 Economou scored the HBO series Lanterns, creating a heavily rock-influenced soundtrack.

== Filmography ==
=== Music department ===
Year	Title	Director(s)	Composer(s)	Notes
2015	Monkey Kingdom	Mark Linfield; Alastair Fothergill	Harry Gregson-Williams	Music arranger
2015	The Martian	Ridley Scott	Harry Gregson-Williams	Additional music
2015	Miss You Already	Catherine Hardwicke	Harry Gregson-Williams	Music arranger
2016	Confirmation	Rick Famuyiwa	Harry Gregson-Williams	Additional orchestrations
2016	Live by Night	Ben Affleck	Harry Gregson-Williams	Additional music
2017	The Zookeeper's Wife	Niki Caro	Harry Gregson-Williams	Additional music
2017	Breath	Simon Baker	Harry Gregson-Williams	Additional music
2017	Electric Dreams	—N/a	Harry Gregson-Williams (theme music)	Vocalist - theme music
2018	Early Man	Nick Park	Harry Gregson-Williams; Tom Howe	Score technical supervisor
2018	The Equalizer 2	Antoine Fuqua	Harry Gregson-Williams	Additional music
2018	The Meg	Jon Turteltaub	Harry Gregson-Williams	Additional music
2019	Whiskey Cavalier	—N/a	Harry Gregson-Williams; Tom Howe	Additional music
2019	Penguins	Alastair Fothergill; Jeff Wilson	Harry Gregson-Williams	Additional music
2019	Catch-22	—N/a	Harry Gregson-Williams; Rupert Gregson-Williams	Additional music
2020	Mulan	Niki Caro	Harry Gregson-Williams	Additional music

=== As composer ===
Year	Title	Director(s)	Studio(s)	Notes
2019	Step Up: High Water	—N/a	YouTube Premium	Season 2
2020	Manhunt	—N/a	Spectrum	Season 2, co-composed with Harry Gregson-Williams
2020	Marvel's 616	—N/a	Disney+	Two episodes, Higher, Further, Faster and Spotlight
2021	Jupiter's Legacy	Steven S. DeKnight; Christopher J. Byrne; Charlotte Brändström; Marc Jobst	Netflix	—N/a
2021	Assassin's Creed Valhalla: The Siege of Paris	—N/a	Ubisoft	—N/a
2021	The Chair	Daniel Gray Longino	Netflix	—N/a
2022	Assassin's Creed Valhalla: Dawn of Ragnarök	—N/a	Ubisoft	Winner: Grammy Award for Best Score Soundtrack for Video Games and Other Interactive Media
2022	More Than Robots	Gillian Jacobs	Disney+	—N/a
2023	About My Father	Laura Terruso	Lionsgate Films	—N/a
2023	Ruby Gillman, Teenage Kraken	Kirk DeMicco	Universal Pictures	—N/a
2023	My Big Fat Greek Wedding 3	Nia Vardalos	Focus Features	—N/a
2025	Gabby's Dollhouse: The Movie	Ryan Crego	Universal Pictures	—N/a
2026	Lanterns	James Hawes, Stephen Williams, Geeta Vasant Patel, Alik Sakharov	HBO	—N/a

== Awards and honors ==
- Fellow for the Sundance Institute Composers Lab
- 2018 NBC/Universal Composers Initiative
- 2023: Grammy Award for Best Score Soundtrack for Video Games and Other Interactive Media
- Board member of the Alliance for Women Film Composers.
