= List of Gabby's Dollhouse episodes =

Gabby's Dollhouse is an American live-action/animated/interactive preschool television series created by Traci Paige Johnson and Jennifer Twomey for Netflix. The series was released on Netflix on January 5, 2021, the Nick Jr. Channel on May 1, 2023, and on Nickelodeon on June 5, 2023.

As of September 14, 2026, 90 episodes of Gabby's Dollhouse have been released.

== Series overview ==
Season	Episodes	Originally released	
Season	Episodes	First released	Last released
1	10	January 5, 2021	
2	8	August 10, 2021	
3	7	October 19, 2021	
4	8	February 1, 2022	
5	6	July 25, 2022	
6	6	November 1, 2022	
7	6	March 20, 2023	
8	7	August 7, 2023	November 6, 2023
9	6	March 25, 2024	
10	6	August 5, 2024	
11	6	February 17, 2025	
12	5	November 17, 2025	
13	5	March 2, 2026	
14	4	September 14, 2026	

== Episodes ==
=== Season 1 (2021) ===
No. overall	No. in season	Title	Directed by	Written by	Original release date	Linear television airdate	Prod. code	U.S. linear viewers (in millions)
1	1	"Spaceship"	Mandy Clotworthy and Kevin Peaty	Written by : Evan Sinclair; Storyboarded by : Ian Young, Belynda Smith, Ben McLaughlin, David Smith, Sasha Mutch and Charlemagne Co	January 5, 2021	May 1, 2023 (Note: on the Nick Jr. Channel)	101	0.14
1	1	"Spaceship"	Mandy Clotworthy and Kevin Peaty	Written by : Evan Sinclair; Storyboarded by : Ian Young, Belynda Smith, Ben McLaughlin, David Smith, Sasha Mutch and Charlemagne Co	January 5, 2021	June 5, 2023 (Note: on Nickelodeon)	101	0.12
In the dollhouse delivery, Gabby receives a spaceship, but CatRat mistakes it for a cat bed and accidentally launches it as the spaceship is nearly caught by Gabby's cat Floyd. Cat of the Day: Cakey sings "Sprinkle Party".
2	2	"Gabby Gets the Hiccups"	Kevin Peaty	Written by : Gilli Nissim; Storyboarded by : David Smith and Charlemagne Co	January 5, 2021	May 2, 2023	102	0.16
2	2	"Gabby Gets the Hiccups"	Kevin Peaty	Written by : Gilli Nissim; Storyboarded by : David Smith and Charlemagne Co	January 5, 2021	June 6, 2023	102	0.09
When a cat in the box makes Gabby get the Hiccups, the Gabby Cats will soon sort it out. Cat of the Day: MerCat sings "Spa Science".
3	3	"Hamster Kitties"	Mandy Clotworthy	Written by : Matt Fleckenstein; Storyboarded by : Abby McKenzie, Belynda Smith and Ian Young	January 5, 2021	May 3, 2023	103	0.11
3	3	"Hamster Kitties"	Mandy Clotworthy	Written by : Matt Fleckenstein; Storyboarded by : Abby McKenzie, Belynda Smith and Ian Young	January 5, 2021	June 7, 2023	103	0.11
Baby Box's new pets, the Hamster Kitties, run off. Cat of the Day: Baby Box makes a homemade Hamster Kitty with the help from the Hamster Kitties.
4	4	"Kitty School"	Dan Riba	Written by : Matt Fleckenstein; Storyboarded by : Douglas McCarthy and Jackson Read	January 5, 2021	May 4, 2023	104	0.14
4	4	"Kitty School"	Dan Riba	Written by : Matt Fleckenstein; Storyboarded by : Douglas McCarthy and Jackson Read	January 5, 2021	June 8, 2023	104	0.13
The Gabby Cats attend their own school, with Pillow Cat, DJ Catnip, CatRat, Cakey, and Carlita as the teachers. Cat of the Day: DJ Catnip sings "The Music in You".
5	5	"Kitty Cat Cam"	Mandy Clotworthy	Written by : Clark Stubbs; Storyboarded by : Abby McKenzie, Belynda Smith and Ian Young	January 5, 2021	May 8, 2023	105	0.17
CatRat uses a camera for a scavenger hunt, and Gabby and Pandy have to find all of the pictures in the dollhouse. Cat of the Day: Baby Box makes kitty ears.
6	6	"Dollhouse Defenders"	Kevin Peaty	Written by : Gilli Nissim; Storyboarded by : David Smith, Charlemagne Co and Regine Clarke	January 5, 2021	May 9, 2023	106	N/A
CatRat invades the dollhouse and kidnaps Cakey, DJ Catnip and Kitty Fairy. It's up to Supurr Gabby and Supurr Pandy (spelt "Super Gabby and Super Pandy" on online sources) to save the day. Cat of the Day: Kitty Fairy sings "The Magic of the Garden".
7	7	"Mixed-Up Dollhouse"	Mandy Clotworthy	Written by : Steve Sullivan; Storyboarded by : Ian Young, Belynda Smith, Abby McKenzie and Regine Clarke	January 5, 2021	May 10, 2023	107	0.10
The dollhouse's different rooms end up getting mixed up. Cat of the Day: Baby Box makes a glitter globe.
8	8	"Game Show"	Dan Riba	Written by : Scott Gray; Storyboarded by : Brian Hatfield, Douglas McCarthy and Jackson Read	January 5, 2021	May 11, 2023	108	0.07
CatRat hosts a game show which takes place in different rooms of the dollhouse. Cat of the Day: CatRat sings "You Can't Spell Meow Without Me". Note: This episode does not have a hug attack from Pandy.
9	9	"Kitty Pirates"	Kevin Peaty	Written by : Evan Sinclair; Storyboarded by : Charlemagne Co, Regine Clarke and David Smith	January 5, 2021	May 15, 2023	109	0.16
Gabby and Pandy play pirates and try to find a treasure chest with each of the areas representing an island. Cat of the Day: Cakey makes pirate pancakes.
10	10	"MerCat Gets Her Sparkle Back"	Dan Riba; Kevin Peaty (Cat of the Day)	Written by : Natalie Barbrie; Storyboarded by : Douglas McCarthy and Jackson Read; Charlemagne Co and David Smith (Cat of the Day)	January 5, 2021	May 16, 2023	110	0.12
MerCat loses her colors before a spa day. Cat of the Day: MerCat sings "Spa Science".

=== Season 2 (2021) ===
No. overall	No. in season	Title	Directed by	Written by	Original release date	Linear television airdate	Prod. code	U.S. linear viewers (in millions)
11	1	"Itty Bitty Blossom"	Mandy Clotworthy	Written by : Evan Sinclair; Storyboarded by : Abby McKenzie, Belynda Smith and Ian Young	August 10, 2021	May 17, 2023	111	0.14
When Gabby receives a flowerpot and seed in the dollhouse delivery, Kitty Fairy's garden magic reveals it to be an Itty Bitty Blossom, so Gabby and Pandy try to take care of her. Cat of the Day: Carlita sings "Let's Go for a Ride!".
12	2	"Dollhouse Store Day"	Dan Riba	Written by : Laura Santoro; Storyboarded by : Douglas McCarthy and Jackson Read	August 10, 2021	May 18, 2023	112	0.10
Gabby and the Gabby Cats prepared for a store's grand-opening-day. Cat of the Day: DJ Catnip sings "The Music in You".
13	3	"Kitty Fairy's Sleepover"	Kevin Peaty	Written by : Clark Stubbs; Storyboarded by : Charlemagne Co, Regine Clarke and David Smith	August 10, 2021	September 4, 2023	113	0.18
Pillow Cat is nervous when Gabby and Pandy attend a sleepover with Kitty Fairy. Cat of the Day: Pillow Cat sings "Roll with It".
14	4	"Let's Make a Movie!"	Kevin Peaty; Dan Riba (Cat of the Day)	Written by : Steve Sullivan; Storyboarded by : Charlemagne Co, Regine Clarke and David Smith; Douglas McCarthy and Jackson Read (Cat of the Day)	August 10, 2021	September 5, 2023	114	0.12
The Gabby Cats are making a movie based on the fairy tale "Goldilocks and the Three Bears" with Gabby, Pandy, Pillow Cat and DJ Catnip as the stars and CatRat as the director. Cat of the Day: Baby Box sings "Crafty-riffic".
15	5	"Pete the Polar Bear"	Dan Riba	Written by : Lucas Mills; Storyboarded by : Douglas McCarthy and Jackson Read	August 10, 2021	September 6, 2023	115	0.15
Pete the Polar Bear comes to the dollhouse for a summer vacation. Gabby, Pandy, and the other Gabby Cats help prepare Pete for a day at the beach as CatRat works as the beach patrol using Carlita as his mode of transportation. Cat of the Day: While riding around in Carlita, CatRat fixes silly problems on the beach.
16	6	"Kitty Rangers"	Kevin Peaty	Written by : Laura Santoro; Storyboarded by : Regine Clarke, Charlemagne Co and David Smith	August 10, 2021	September 11, 2023	116	0.18
Gabby and the Gabby Cats find a Me-owl's mother. Cat of the Day: Gabby and the Gabby Cats sing Gabby's version of the show's theme song.
17	7	"The Meow-Mazing Games"	Mandy Clotworthy	Written by : Matt Fleckenstein; Storyboarded by : Abby McKenzie, Gener Ocampo and Belynda Smith	August 10, 2021	September 12, 2023	117	0.15
DJ Catnip and CatRat serve as announcers for the Meow-Mazing Games with Carlita and the Gabby Cats rivaling the Doodads. Cat of the Day: Carlita sings "Let's Go for a Ride!".
18	8	"Pandy's Birthday"	Mandy Clotworthy	Written by : Roxy Simons; Storyboarded by : Abby McKenzie, Gener Ocampo and Belynda Smith	August 10, 2021	September 13, 2023	118	0.09
It is Pandy's birthday and the Gabby Cats surprise him. Cat of the Day: Pandy sings "Living in the Meow".

=== Season 3 (2021) ===
No. overall	No. in season	Title	Directed by	Written by	Original release date	Linear television airdate	Prod. code	U.S. linear viewers (in millions)
19	1	"The Dollhouse Hotel"	Mandy Clotworthy; Kevin Peaty (Cat of the Day)	Written by : Matt Fleckenstein; Storyboarded by : Abby McKenzie, Gener Ocampo and Belynda Smith; Charlemagne Co, Regine Clarke and David Smith (Cat of the Day)	October 19, 2021	September 18, 2023	119	0.13
Gabby and Pandy go to the Dollhouse Hotel, which is owned and staffed by the other Gabby Cats. Though certain things go missing, which include some of CatRat's items, Gabby and Pandy try to find the culprit. Cat of the Day: Pillow Cat sings "Roll with It".
20	2	"A Knight's Tail"	Nick Salmon	Written by : Max Beaudry and Francisco Paredes; Storyboarded by : Jason Horychun and Kanako Iwata	October 19, 2021	September 19, 2023	120	0.14
Gabby and Pandy must find the key to the locked door while competing with CatRat. Cat of the Day: Pandy makes a knight shield with the help of some Hamster Kitties.
21	3	"DJ Catnip's Glow Ride"	Dan Riba	Written by : Natalie Barbrie; Storyboarded by : Douglas McCarthy and Jackson Read	October 19, 2021	March 11, 2024	121	N/A
Gabby receives a glow-in-the-dark train, but its train cars are missing. With help from DJ Catnip, the Gabby Cats build the remaining train cars. Cat of the Day: DJ Catnip sings "The Music in You".
22	4	"The Rainy Day Banana"	Dan Riba; Mandy Clotworthy and Kevin Peaty (Cat of the Day)	Written by : Evan Gore and Heather Lombard; Storyboarded by : Douglas McCarthy and Jackson Read; Ian Young, Belynda Smith, Ben McLaughlin, David Smith, Sasha Mutch and Charlemagne Co (Cat of the Day)	October 19, 2021	March 12, 2024	122	N/A
Gabby, Pandy, and CatRat inexplicably find a sparkly banana on a rainy day. Cat of the Day: Cakey sings "Sprinkle Party".
23	5	"CatRat the Bandit"	Kevin Peaty; Mandy Clotworthy (Cat of the Day)	Written by : Natalie Barbrie; Storyboarded by : Charlemagne Co, Regine Clarke and David Smith; Abby McKenzie, Gener Ocampo, Belynda Smith (Cat of the Day)	October 19, 2021	March 13, 2024	123	N/A
The dollhouse is going to the Wild West, as Gabby and Pandy attempt to stop the outlaw CatRat. Cat of the Day: Pandy sings "Living in the Meow".
24	6	"DJ Catnip Gets His Groove Back"	Mandy Clotworthy; Kevin Smith (Cat of the Day)	Written by : Clark Stubbs; Storyboarded by : Abby McKenzie, Gener Ocampo, Belynda Smith and Darwin Tan; Charlemagne Co, Regine Clarke and David Smith (Cat of the Day)	October 19, 2021	March 14, 2024	124	N/A
The Gabby Cats will help DJ Catnip get his groove back. Cat of the Day: Gabby and the Gabby Cats sing Gabby's version of the show's theme song.
25	7	"Kitty Fairy Gets Sick"	Dan Riba; Kevin Peaty (Cat of the Day)	Written by : Matt Fleckenstein; Storyboarded by : Douglas McCarthy and Jackson Read; Charlemagne Co, Regine Clarke and David Smith (Cat of the Day)	October 19, 2021	March 18, 2024	125	N/A
When Kitty Fairy gets sick, Gabby, Pandy and the others get her to the garden. Cat of the Day: Kitty Fairy sings "The Magic of the Garden".

=== Season 4 (2022) ===
No. overall	No. in season	Title	Directed by	Written by	Original release date	Linear television airdate	Prod. code
26	1	"Cakey's Cupcake Cousins"	Kevin Peaty; Mandy Clotworthy (Cat of the Day)	Written by : Matt Fleckenstein and Jennifer Twomey; Storyboarded by : Charlemagne Co, Regine Clarke and David Smith; Abby McKenzie, Gener Ocampo and Belynda Smith (Cat of the Day)	February 1, 2022	March 19, 2024	201
Cakey has his cousins meeting him for the first time. Cat of the Day: Pillow Cat sings "Roll with It".
27	2	"It's Purrsday!"	Nuranee Shaw	Written by : Elise Allen; Storyboarded by : Dennis Crawford and Desirae Witte	February 1, 2022	March 20, 2024	202
It's Purrsday as Gabby and the Gabby Cats celebrate a tremendous holiday with a special party. Cat of the Day: DJ Catnip makes a Purrsday purrstick.
28	3	"Dollhouse Safari"	Nuranee Shaw	Written by : Dannah Phirman; Storyboarded by : Dennis Crawford and Desirae Witte	February 1, 2022	March 21, 2024	203
Carlita creates a safari adventure for herself and the Gabby Cats. Cat of the Day: Cakey makes a lion safari snack.
29	4	"Fluffy Flufferton"	Nick Salmon	Written by : Dana Chan; Storyboarded by : Christine Cunningham, Talia Ellis and Jason Horychun	February 1, 2022	March 25, 2024	204
A singing popstar named Fluffy Flufferton comes to the dollhouse. Cat of the Day: DJ Catnip, Fluffy Flufferton and the Gabby Cats sing "The Dollhouse Hotel".
30	5	"Abra-CAT-Dabra!"	Lianne Hughes	Written by : Corey Powell; Storyboarded by : Murray Debus, Mark Sonntag and Darwin Tan	February 1, 2022	March 26, 2024	205
Baby Box creates accidental magic tricks using a magic hat. Cat of the Day: Baby Box sings "Whoopsies!" with Gabby and Pandy.
31	6	"The Fairy Festival!"	Lianne Hughes	Written by : Clark Stubbs; Storyboarded by : Mark Sonntag, Darwin Tan and Anne Yi	February 1, 2022	March 27, 2024	206
Gabby and Pandy meet a fairy named Luli-Loo, whose dream is to win the Fairy Flower Contest at Kitty Fairy's fairy festival. Cat of the Day: Kitty Fairy sings "The Magic of the Garden" with Luli-Loo in a duet.
32	7	"Dollhouse FairyTales"	Nuranee Shaw	Written by : Dannah Phirman; Storyboarded by : Dennis Crawford and Desirae Witte	February 1, 2022	June 10, 2024	207
When the fairy tale book is missing some fairy tales, Gabby and Pandy play the fairy tales itself with the Gabby Cats. Cat of the Day: CatRat sings "You Can't Spell Meow Without Me".
33	8	"The Easter Kitty Bunny"	Kevin Peaty	Written by : Matt Fleckenstein; Storyboarded by : Charlemagne Co, Regine Clarke and David Smith	February 1, 2022	March 28, 2024	208
Gabby and Pandy babysit an Easter Kitty Bunny named Eggy. Cat of the Day: Baby Box creates an Easter egg Kitty Bunny.

=== Season 5 (2022) ===
No. overall	No. in season	Title	Directed by	Written by	Original release date	Linear television airdate	Prod. code
34	1	"Gabby, I Shrunk the Kitties!"	Lianne Hughes	Written by : Max Beaudry and Francisco Paredes; Storyboarded by : Mark Sonntag, Darwin Tan and Anne Ying	July 25, 2022	June 11, 2024	209
Gabby and Pandy get shrunk, and they need MerCat's help to grow back to normal size. Cat of the Day: MerCat creates mermaid foam with the help from two Hamster Kitties.
35	2	"Mission to CATurn"	Nick Salmon	Written by : Ghia Godfree; Storyboarded by : Jason Horychun and Dave Wiebe	July 25, 2022	June 12, 2024	210
Gabby and Pandy takes a space ride to Planet Caturn after CatRat gets stuck while looking for space cheese. Cat of the Day: Baby Box, with the help from DJ Comet, creates a paper-mache Planet Caturn.
36	3	"Doodlebook"	Lianne Hughes	Written by : Jennifer Twomey; Storyboarded by : Regine Clarke, David Smith, Mark Sonntag and Darwin Tan	July 25, 2022	June 13, 2024	211
Gabby finds a book with the same drawing on every page. When she goes inside the dollhouse, the Gabby Cats use their own imagination to add their own take to the drawings. Cat of the Day: MerCat sings "Spa Science" with some hidden easter eggs in the music video related to the episode.
37	4	"Cupcake Tree"	Lianne Hughes	Written by : Dannah Phirman; Storyboarded by : Mark Sonntag, Darwin Tan and Anne Ying	July 25, 2022	June 17, 2024	212
Cakey helps Gabby and Pandy shrink down a giant cupcake tree and rescue the other Gabby Cats from its overgrown branches. Cat of the Day: Cakey sings "Sprinkle Party".
38	5	"Dollhouse Detectives"	Nuranee Shaw	Written by : Abby Hodge; Storyboarded by : Dennis Crawford and Desirae Witte	July 25, 2022	June 18, 2024	213
When things disappear around the dollhouse, detectives Gabby and Pandy have to solve the mystery. Cat of the Day: CatRat makes painted ice cubes with the help from a few baby Me-owls.
39	6	"Happy CAT-O-Ween!"	Nick Salmon	Written by : Dannah Phirman; Storyboarded by : Jason Horychun and Dave Wiebe	July 25, 2022	October 12, 2024	214
During Cat-o-Ween, the Gabby Cats in the dollhouse are celebrating in different ways: Gabby and Pandy make Cat-o-Lanterns with Baby Box, make banana ghosts with Cakey and search for treats with MerCat. Cat of the Day: Gabby and the Gabby Cats sing "Halloween Holla Holla" in the sequence.

=== Season 6 (2022) ===
No. overall	No. in season	Title	Directed by	Written by	Original release date	Linear television airdate	Prod. code
40	1	"A CAT-Tabulous Christmas"	Mary Hutson	Written by : Dannah Phirman; Storyboarded by : Manuk Chang, Aaron Davis, Abby McKenzie and Mauricio Pizarro	November 1, 2022	December 7, 2024	215
Gabby and Pandy must help Figgy the Elf wrap the presents correctly, have their own Christmas wishes, and deliver presents to all of the Gabby Cats. Cat of the Day: Baby Box, with the help from Gabby and Pandy, creates a rainbow kitty tree topper.
41	2	"CatRat's Puzzle Hunt"	Emily Jourdan	Written by : Dannah Phirman; Storyboarded by : Marcelo De Souza and Talia Ellis	November 1, 2022	June 19, 2024	216
CatRat makes a puzzle hunt and takes Gabby and Pandy through the dollhouse with games to play, riddles to solve, and surprises to find. Cat of the Day: Baby Box, with a little help from DJ Catnip, creates a puzzle with popsicle sticks.
42	3	"Super Thinkers!"	Emily Jourdan	Written by : Jennifer Twomey; Storyboarded by : Marcelo De Souza and Talia Ellis	November 1, 2022	June 20, 2024	217
In order to become Super Thinkers, Gabby, Pandy, and Carlita must use their bodies and minds to complete their Super Thinker Camp by solving puzzles and obstacles. Cat of the Day: Gabby, Pandy, DJ Catnip, and Cakey sing "Power of Yet!"
43	4	"Paper Cup Popper"	Lianne Hughes and Pete Jacobs	Written by : Nicole Belisle; Storyboarded by : Regine Clarke and Aaron Davies	November 1, 2022	September 17, 2024	218
After Gabby finds a box of paper cups, she and the Gabby Cats have fun playing games, making animal crafts, and telling stories with them. Cat of the Day: CatRat plays a cup and ball game.
44	5	"Dollhouse Dress-Up Chest"	Emily Jourdan	Written by : Abby Hodge; Storyboarded by : Marcelo De Souza and Talia Ellis	November 1, 2022	September 18, 2024	219
Gabby got a dollhouse delivery, and it turned out to be a dress-up chest. She uses her dress-up ability and teams up with Pandy to travel to the Wild West with Baby Box, soar into outer space with DJ Catnip and DJ Comet, and go underwater with Pillow Cat. Cat of the Day: Pillow Cat sings "Roll with It".
45	6	"Kico the KittyCorn"	Mary Hutson	Written by : Dannah Phirman; Storyboarded by : Manuk Chang, Stephen Cooper, Abby McKenzie, Mauricio Pizarro and Mark Sonntag	November 1, 2022	September 19, 2024	220
It's a rainy day, and a KittyCorn named Kico needs to be taken care of, so Gabby, Pandy, and the rest of the Gabby Cats must take great care and find her adoring family. Cat of the Day: Pandy, Gabby, and the Gabby Cats sing "Spice of Life".

=== Season 7 (2023) ===
No. overall	No. in season	Title	Directed by	Written by	Original release date	Linear television airdate	Prod. code
46	1	"Planes, Trains, and Kitty Balloons!"	Nuranee Shaw	Written by : Sindy Boveda Spackman; Storyboarded by : Dennis Crawford and Desirae Witte	March 20, 2023	September 20, 2024	221
Gabby and Pandy take a travel adventure using a train, plane, cruise ship, and hot air balloon while also taking pictures for CatRat. Cat of the Day: Baby Box sings "Crafty-riffic."
47	2	"True Fairy Friends"	Mary Hutson	Written by : James Eason-Garcia; Storyboarded by : Abby McKenzie, Ivaylo IvantchevMauricio Pizarro, Darwin Tan and Anne Ying	March 20, 2023	September 23, 2024	222
A fairy fly is coming to live in the Fairy Tail Garden. Gabby, Pandy, Kitty Fairy, and Luli-Loo will become true friends with him by proving they are helpful, kind, and welcoming to him. Cat of the Day: Kitty Fairy and Bitty Fairy create a Fairy Fly Lantern.
48	3	"Googly Eyes"	Emily Jourdan	Written by : Gus Constantellis; Storyboarded by : Marcelo De Souza and Talia Ellis	March 20, 2023	September 24, 2024	223
After shaking a magical jar of googly eyes and accidentally brings things to life, Gabby, Pandy, and CatRat have got to stop the troublemakers from causing havoc in the Dollhouse. Cat of the Day: Pandy sings "Snacky in My Packy".
49	4	"Spongey-Saurus"	Mary Hutson	Written by : Mary Jacobson; Storyboarded by : Manuk Chang, Ivaylo Ivantchev, Aband Mauricio Pizarro	March 20, 2023	September 25, 2024	224
A toy dinosaur named Spongey comes to the Dollhouse, but he is going to shrink. Gabby, Pandy, and the Gabby Cats try to grow him back to normal. Cat of the Day: DJ Catnip and Spongey sing "Grow Your Mind."
50	5	"Baby Box's Meow-Seum Day!"	Lianne Hughes	Written by : Natalie Barbrie; Storyboarded by : Regine Clarke, Aaron Davies and Jen Tuyet Ta	March 20, 2023	September 26, 2024	225
The Gabby Cats need to make a special art project for Baby Box's Meow-Seum Day. Cat of the Day: Baby Box sings "Crafty-riffic."
51	6	"Carlita the Ice Cream Truck!"	Lianne Hughes	Written by : Clark Stubbs; Storyboarded by : Regine Clarke, Aaron Davies and Jen Tuyet Ta	March 20, 2023	November 4, 2024	226
Carlita has turned into an ice cream truck. Before she can deliver sweet treats to all the Gabby Cats, she will require ice cream, a menu, and a song. Cat of the Day: Baby Box makes an ice cream truck.

=== Season 8 (2023) ===
No. overall	No. in season	Title	Directed by	Written by	Original release date	Linear television airdate	Prod. code
52	1	"The Magical Mermaid-Lantis"	Lianne Hughes; Emily Jourdan (Cat of the Day)	Written by : Mary Jacobson; Storyboarded by : Regine Clarke, Aaron Davies and Jen Tuyet Ta; Marcelo De Souza and Talia Ellis (Cat of the Day)	August 7, 2023	November 5, 2024	301
Gabby and her friends go to Mermaid-Lantis for the "Sparkle Party", where they celebrate the sparkle that makes them happy. Cat of the Day: Gabby, Pandy, Cakey and DJ Catnip sing "Power of Yet!".
53	2	"Snow Cruise"	Lianne Hughes	Written by : Clark Stubbs; Storyboarded by : Regine Clarke, Aaron Davies and Jen Tuyet Ta	August 7, 2023	November 11, 2024	302
Gabby and her friends go on a cruise to the North Pole to see Pete the Polar Bear's rainbow igloo. Cat of the Day: Gabby and the Gabby Cats sing "I Love a Rainbow".
54	3	"Baby Benny Box is Here!"	Emily Jourdan	Written by : Gus Constantellis; Storyboarded by : Marcelo De Souza and Talia Ellis	August 7, 2023	November 6, 2024	303
The Box Family welcomes their newest member, Benny Box. Cat of the Day: Gabby and Pandy make a Benny Box craft.
55	4	"The Mermaid Cruise Ship"	Emily Jourdan	Written by : Mary Jacobson; Storyboarded by : Anna Brown, Breanne Butters, Marcelo De Souza and Talia Ellis	August 7, 2023	November 7, 2024	304
Gabby and her friends have a cruise on the SS Mercat. Cat of the Day: MerCat and her sister SunnyCat create a Kitty Narwhal Ring Toss game.
56	5	"Charm Bracelet Treasure Hunt"	Mary Hutson	Written by : Amy Steinberg; Storyboarded by : Ivaylo Ivantchev, Abby McKenzie, Mauricio Pizarro, Anne Yi and Ian Young	August 7, 2023	November 12, 2024	305
A bracelet leads Gabby and Pandy on a treasure hunt to recover three special treasures. Cat of the Day: Cakey makes a doughnut kitty.
57	6	"CatRat's KittyFish"	Mary Hutson; Mandy Clotworthy (Cat of the Day)	Written by : Clark Stubbs; Storyboarded by : Grace Chen, Abby McKenzie, Anne Yi and Ian Young; Abby McKenzie, Belynda Smith and Ian Young (Cat of the Day)	August 7, 2023	November 13, 2024	306
Gabby and Pandy have to catch CatRat's pet KittyFish when they run away. Cat of the Day: Baby Box makes kitty ears.
58	7	"The Mermaid Christmas Cruise"	Lianne Hughes	Written by : Clark Stubbs; Storyboarded by : Regine Clarke, Aaron Davies and Jen Tuyet Ta	November 6, 2023	December 8, 2025	307
Gabby goes on a Christmas cruise. Cat of the Day: Baby Box, Gabby and Pandy make a Christmas kitty cat surprise box tower.

=== Season 9 (2024) ===
No. overall	No. in season	Title	Directed by	Written by	Original release date	Linear television airdate	Prod. code
59	1	"Music Festival"	Lianne Hughes; Nuranee Shaw (Cat of the Day)	Written by : Ryder Chasin; Storyboarded by : Regine Clarke, Mauricio Pizarro, David Smith, Jen Tuyet Ta and Darwin Tan; Dennis Crawford and Desirae Witte (Cat of the Day)	March 25, 2024	July 7, 2025	308
When Gabby and Pandy score party passes to DJ Catnip's music festival, they board a groovy bus to watch shows featuring all their favorite Gabby Cats. Cat of the Day: DJ Catnip shows how to make a Purr Stick.
60	2	"Cakey's Birthday"	Emily Jourdan; Mandy Clotworthy and Kevin Peaty (Cat of the Day)	Written by : Alyson Piekarsky; Storyboarded by : Anna Brown and Apollonia Vick; Ian Young, Belynda Smith, Ben Mclaughlin, David Smith, Sasha Mutch and Charlemagne Co (Cat of the Day)	March 25, 2024	July 14, 2025	309
Cakey runs out of sprinkles on his birthday. His friends figure out a way to bring the sprinkles back to Cakey. Cat of the Day: Cakey sings "Sprinkle Party".
61	3	"Pandy's Bad Day"	Lianne Hughes	Written by : Gus Constantellis; Storyboarded by : Regine Clarke, David Smith and Jen Tuyet Ta	March 25, 2024	July 21, 2025	310
After messing up his attack and getting a hole in his Pandy Pack, Pandy realizes he's having a bad day, but things just keep getting worse. Cat of the Day: DJ Catnip and the Gabby Cats sing "Bad Day".
62	4	"Baby Box's Crafty-riffic Adventure"	Emily Jourdan	Written by : Caitlin Hodson; Storyboarded by : Anna Brown, Michelle Thompkins-Lima and Apollonia Vick	March 25, 2024	July 28, 2025	311
Gabby receives a Crafty-riffic Adventure Kit in her Dollhouse Delivery, which comes in handy when CatRat spends the day crafting some Silly Bad Guys. Cat of the Day: CatRat, Gabby, Pandy and the Silly Bad Guys with Googly eyes sing "Silly Bad Guys".
63	5	"Silly Kitty Cubes"	Mary Hutson; Kevin Peaty (Cat of the Day)	Written by : Ryder Chasin; Storyboarded by : Grace Chen, Aaron Davies, Abby McKenzie, Quynh Truong and Ian Young; Regine Clarke, Charlemagne Co and David Smith (Cat of the Day)	March 25, 2024	August 4, 2025	312
Gabby brings her Silly Kitty Cubes with her to the dollhouse, where all the Gabby Cats play along by making up stories based on what they've rolled. Cat of the Day: Pillow Cat sings "Roll with It", with a slightly different change to the lyrics to make it related to the episode.
64	6	"Carlita's A-Meowzing Race"	Mary Hutson; Lianne Hughes (Cat of the Day)	Written by : Donovan Cook; Storyboarded by : Grace Chen, Aaron Davies, Abby McKenzie, Quynh Truong and Ian Young; Regine Clarke, Aaron Davies and Jen Tuyet Ta (Cat of the Day)	March 25, 2024	September 22, 2025	313
At Carlita's A-meowzing Race, Gabby and her friends speed around solving puzzles to win a special surprise. Cat of the Day: Gabby and the Gabby Cats sing "I Love a Rainbow".

=== Season 10 (2024) ===
No. overall	No. in season	Title	Directed by	Written by	Original release date	Linear television airdate	Prod. code
65	1	"Happy Birthday, Gabby!"	Emily Jourdan; Lianne Hughes (Cat of the Day)	Written by : Clark Stubbs; Storyboarded by : Anna Brown and Apollonia Vick; Regine Clarke, Aaron Davies, and Jen Tuyet Ta (Cat of the Day)	August 5, 2024	September 23, 2025	314
It is Gabby's birthday and the Gabby Cats have prepared surprises for her, including CatRat, who showed her the Dollhouse's new room, the Party Room. Cat of the Day: Gabby and Pandy sing "Better Together".
66	2	"Marty the Party Cat"	Mary Hutson	Written by : Clark Stubbs; Storyboarded by : Grace Chen, Abby McKenzie, Mauricio Pizarro, Quynh Truong, and Ian Young	August 5, 2024	September 24, 2025	315
A new Gabby Cat named Marty the Party Cat has come to the Dollhouse as Gabby, Pandy and the rest of the Gabby Cats show him the features in the Party Room. Cat of the Day: Marty the Party Cat sings "Marty Party".
67	3	"You Wish!"	Emily Jourdan; Lianne Hughes (Cat of the Day)	Written by : Clark Stubbs; Storyboarded by : Anna Brown and Apollonia Vick; Murray Debus, Mark Sonntag, and Darwin Tan (Cat of the Day)	August 5, 2024	September 25, 2025	316
After receiving a wishing fountain as a dollhouse delivery, Gabby helps make the Gabby Cats' wishes come true, except Pandy, who cannot decide what he wants. Cat of the Day: Baby Box sings "Whoopsies!" with Gabby and Pandy.
68	4	"CatRat's Birthday Surprise"	Emily Jourdan	Written by : Clark Stubbs; Storyboarded by : Marcelo De Souza and Talia Ellis	August 5, 2024	September 29, 2025	317
It's CatRat's birthday and the Gabby Cats are planning a surprise party for him and Fluffy Flufferton. Cat of the Day: CatRat makes his crafty self "CraftRat" with the help from two Hamster Kitties.
69	5	"Craft Bot"	Lianne Hughes	Written by : Gus Constantellis; Storyboarded by : Regine Clarke, David Smith, and Jen Tuyet Ta	August 5, 2024	September 30, 2025	318
There is confusion in the Dollhouse, when Baby Box's Kitty Bots wind up in the wrong rooms. Cat of the Day: Baby Box and Craft Bot make a homemade "Kitty Bot".
70	6	"Grandma CatRat"	Lianne Hughes	Written by : Amy Steinberg; Storyboarded by : Regine Clarke, Aaron Davies, and Jen Tuyet Ta	August 5, 2024	October 1, 2025	319
CatRat is excited to see his grandmother visiting the Dollhouse. Cat of the Day: CatRat and his grandmother play a game of 4 in a Row.

=== Season 11 (2025) ===
No. overall	No. in season	Title	Directed by	Written by	Original release date	Linear television airdate	Prod. code
71	1	"Kitty Care Ear"	Mary Hutson; Emily Jourdan (Cat of the Day)	Written by : Mary Jacobsen; Storyboarded by : Grace Chen, Aaron Davies, Abby McKenzie, Quynh Truong, and Ian Young; Marcelo De Souza and Talia Ellis (Cat of the Day)	February 17, 2025	June 6, 2026	320
There's a new room in the Dollhouse called Kitty Care Ear, which houses the little babies inside. But when the babies begin to cry, due to their different problems, Gabby, Pandy and CatRat take each of the two babies to every room of the dollhouse. Cat of the Day: Gabby and Pandy make a Benny Box craft.
72	2	"Benny's First Tooth"	Lianne Hughes	Written by : Ryder Chasin; Storyboarded by : Regine Clarke, David Smith, and Jen Tuyet Ta	February 17, 2025	June 13, 2026	321
Benny gets his first tooth. Gabby, Pandy, Baby Box and their Gabby Cat friends teach him from using a toothbrush to cleaning his teeth. Cat of the Day: Baby Box and Benny Box make a Tooth Fairy Toothbrush Holder.
73	3	"Happy Kitty-tine's Day!"	Lianne Hughes	Written by : Clark Stubbs; Storyboarded by : Regine Clarke, Aaron Davies, and Jen Tuyet Ta	February 17, 2025	June 20, 2026	322
It's Kitty-tine's Day in the Dollhouse, and Gabby and Pandy follow the candy trail to a Kitty-tine's Day party, leading to crafts, treats, songs and a bit of garden magic. Cat of the Day: Gabby and Pandy sing "Better Together".
74	4	"Baby Alien Kitty"	Emily Jourdan	Written by : Anika Chowdhury; Storyboarded by : Anna Brown and Apollonia Vick	February 17, 2025	June 27, 2026	323
In a dollhouse delivery, a mysterious egg with a Baby Alien Kitty named Googie inside, needs to get back to their own mother. Cat of the Day: Gabby and the Gabby Cats sing "You Be You".
75	5	"Pillow Cat Can't Sleep"	Mary Hutson; Emily Jourdan (Cat of the Day)	Written by : Clark Stubbs; Storyboarded by : Grace Chen, Abby McKenzie, Mauricio Pizarro, Quynh Truong, and Ian Young; Marcelo De Souza and Talia Ellis (Cat of the Day)	February 17, 2025	July 11, 2026	324
It's bedtime in the Dollhouse, but Pillow Cat can't sleep at all. Cat of the Day: Gabby, Pandy, Cakey and DJ Catnip sing "Power of Yet!".
76	6	"Family Day"	Mary Hutson; Dan Riba (Cat of the Day)	Written by : Gus Constantellis; Storyboarded by : Grace Chen, Aaron Davies, Abby McKenzie, Quynh Truong, and Ian Young; Douglas McCarthy and Jackson Read (Cat of the Day)	February 17, 2025	July 18, 2026	325
It's Kitty Family Day in the Dollhouse, and with the help of Gabby's magic charm bracelet, Gabby, Pandy and their Gabby Cat friends make fun surprises to show their appreciation for each other. Cat of the Day: Gabby and the Gabby Cats sing Gabby's version of the show's theme song.

=== Season 12 (2025) ===
No. overall	No. in season	Title	Directed by	Written by	Original release date	Prod. code
77	1	"The Wizard of Meow"	Mary Hutson; Kevin Peaty (Cat of the Day)	Written by : Caitlin Hodson; Storyboarded by : Grace Chen, Tang Ngack Lee, Hayden Morris and Quynh Truong	November 17, 2025	326
With the help of Pandy the Scarecrow, Baby Box the Tin Box, and Marty the Party Lion, Gabby must go to Emerald Kitty City and meet the Wizard of Meow, while dodging obstacles from "Bad Witch" MerCat along the way. Cat of the Day: MerCat sings "Spa Science". Note: This episode is a reference to The Wizard of Oz.
78	2	"Cakey's Cabinet Café"	Lianne Hughes; Mary Hutson (Cat of the Day)	Written by : Ryder Chasin; Storyboarded by : Regine Clarke, David Smith and Jen Tuyet Ta; Ivaylo Ivantchev, Abby McKenzie, Mauricio Pizarro, Anne Yi and Ian Young (Cat of the Day)	November 17, 2025	327
Cakey reveals an adorable mini eatery inside his kitchen cabinet. Gabby, Pandy and maitre d'CatRat help Cakey get all the things he needs to get his tiny restaurant ready for the Hamster Kitties. Cat of the Day: Cakey makes a doughnut kitty.
79	3	"How to Train Your Kitty Dragon"	Mandy Clotworthy	Written by : Dannah Phirman; Storyboarded by : Ben McLaughlin, Andrea Supandi and Ian Young	November 17, 2025	328
CatRat the Brave meets a baby kitty dragon who gets stuck on a marshmallow tower in the Kingdom of Squish. Brave knights Gabby the Bold and Pandy the Purr-oud help CatRat rescue his dragon friend, only to discover he can't see very well and needs an eye exam. Cat of the Day: Baby Box, with the help of Sparkle, makes a fire breathing dragon. Note: The episode's name is a reference to How to Train Your Dragon.
80	4	"The Magic Bananas"	Emily Jourdan	Written by : Clark Stubbs; Storyboarded by : Anna Brown and Apollonia Vick; Marcelo De Souza and Talia Ellis (Cat of the Day)	November 17, 2025	329
Gabby unboxes special magic bananas where there's a little magic in every bite. Silly shenanigans ensue in the Dollhouse with the Gabby Cats taking turns surprising one another with their magical powers. Cat of the Day: Pandy sings "Snacky in My Packy".
81	5	"Good to Be a Gabby Cat Game Show!"	Michelle Thompkins-Lima	Story by : Traci Paige Johnson and Jennifer Twomey; Teleplay by : Ryder Chasin and Jennifer Twomey; Storyboarded by : Michelle Thompkins-Lima	November 17, 2025	330
Gabby hosts a game show in her bedroom, where the Gabby Cats are contestants as they celebrate the memories from the littlest wins to the biggest whoopsies. Note: The game show named after the episode is based on Hollywood Squares. This episode does not feature a Cat of the Day segment.

=== Season 13 (2026) ===
No. overall	No. in season	Title	Directed by	Written by	Original release date	Prod. code
82	1	"The Secret World of Fairylandia"	Mandy Clotworthy; Mary Hutson (Cat of the Day)	Written by : Caitlin Hodson; Storyboarded by : Ben McLaughlin, Andrea Supandi, Kevin Wotton and Ian Young; Grace Chen (Cat of the Day)	March 2, 2026	401
After receiving a dandelion wand and being chosen as the Dandelion Fairy, Gabby and Pandy, along with Kitty Fairy, go to Fairylandia, where all the fairies live. But when CatRat accidentally sends the wand flying to the other side of Fairylandia, Gabby, Pandy and CatRat find it and bring it back in time for the Dandelion Lights. Cat of the Day: Kitty Fairy sings "Only in Fairylandia" with Gabby and Pandy.
83	2	"Fairy Appreciation Day"	Lianne Hughes; Mary Hutson (Cat of the Day)	Written by : Caitlin Hodson; Storyboarded by : Marc Camelbeke, Ben Grimshaw, Mauricio Pizarro and Kevin Wotton; Abby McKenzie (Cat of the Day)	March 2, 2026	402
It's Fairy Appreciation Day in the dollhouse, but when an accident struck, it's Gabby and her Gabby Cat friends to the rescue, as they help Kitty Fairy get her wings and her garden magic back. Cat of the Day: Kitty Fairy and Bitty Fairy create a Fairy Fly Lantern.
84	3	"Kitty Bear Tea Party"	Lianne Hughes; Kevin Peaty (Cat of the Day)	Written by : Dannah Phirman; Storyboarded by : Marc Camelbeke, Steve Cooper, Ben Grimshaw, Ben McLaughlin and Mauricio Pizarro; David Smith (Cat of the Day)	March 2, 2026	403
It's the Magical Tea Party at the Fairylandia Spa, and Gabby and the Gabby Cats are invited to join Kitty Fairy in a tea party where the Kitty Bears come to life. Cat of the Day: Kitty Fairy sings "The Magic of the Garden".
85	4	"Pandy and the Kitty-pillar"	Lianne Hughes	Written by : Clark Stubbs; Storyboarded by : Ben Grimshaw, Mauricio Pizarro and Kevin Wotton	March 2, 2026	404
A Kitty-pillar named Pickles needs nurturing, it's up to Pandy, Gabby and their friends to transform her into a Kitty-Butterfly. Cat of the Day: Pandy and Pickles create a Pom-Pom Kitty-Pillar.
86	5	"Opposite Day"	Emily Jourdan	Written by : Alyson Piekarsky; Storyboarded by : Anna Brown and Apollonia Vick	March 2, 2026	405
It's Opposite Day in the Dollhouse, and to celebrate the occasion, Gabby unboxes Opposite Cat, who can make any opposite magic happen. Whether it's upside down, slow and fast, short and tall, big and small, all the Gabby Cats' opposite dreams come true. Cat of the Day: Pandy sings "Living in the Meow".

=== Season 14 (2026) ===
No. overall	No. in season	Title	Directed by	Written by	Original release date	Prod. code
87	1	"Meet Doozie"	Lianne Hughes	Written by : Caitlin Hodson and Jennifer Twomey; Storyboarded by : Marc Camelbeke, Ben Grimshaw, Tang Ngack Lee and Mauricio Pizarro	September 14, 2026	406
When Gabby's sister Doozie received puppy ears, she and Puggie join Gabby and Pandy on a trip around the Dollhouse. Cat of the Day: Gabby, Doozie, Pandy and Puggie sing "Meow-Meow Bow-Wow Family!"
88	2	"Cakey and CreamPup's Playdate"	Chiara Ferrari	Written by : Clark Stubbs; Storyboarded by : Dennis Crawford, Steve Garcia and Jason Horychun	September 14, 2026	409
Doozie's friend CreamPup pops into the Dollhouse, after a mistaken Dollhouse Delivery is delivered to Cakey. CreamPup helps Cakey turn the mix-up into a baking playdate. Cat of the Day: Cakey and CreamPup sing the remixed version of "Sprinkle Party".
89	3	"Fairy Sitters"	Mary Hutson	Written by : Alyson Piekarsky; Storyboarded by : Grace Chen, Hayden Morris, Tang Ngack Lee and Quynh Truong	September 14, 2026	407
Gabby and Pandy take Luli-Loo on a tour around the Dollhouse, while fairysitting her. When it is time for bed, Luli-Loo had forgotten her kitty bear, but Kitty Fairy showed up with it. Cat of the Day: Luli-Loo gives Gabby a fairy makeover.
90	4	"DJ's Birthday Mystery Ride"	Mary Hutson; Emily Jourdan (Cat of the Day)	Written by : Anika Chowdhury and Caitlin Hodson; Storyboarded by : Grace Chen, Hayden Morris, Tang Ngack Lee and Quynh Truong; Talia Ellis (Cat of the Day)	September 14, 2026	408
It's DJ Catnip's birthday, as Gabby, Pandy and CatRat take DJ on a mystery birthday ride on DJ's groovy party bus to 3 different places: Kittytown in the Wild West, Fairylandia and Birthday Island. Cat of the Day: Baby Box, with a little help from DJ Catnip, creates a puzzle with popsicle sticks.
